= Criminal Law Revision Committee =

The Criminal Law Revision Committee of England & Wales was a standing committee of legal experts that was called upon by the Home Secretary to advise on legal issues and to report back recommendations for reform. While never formally abolished, it has been dormant since 1986 and superseded by the Law Commission.

== Overview ==
The first committee was set up by Rab Butler in February 1959 ‘to examine such aspects of the criminal law...as the Home Secretary may from time to time refer to the Committee, to consider whether the law requires revision and to make recommendations’. While members worked on a voluntary basis, it subsequently published eighteen reports on numerous contentious legal issues. Although not all of the Committee's reports have been adopted by Parliament, many have had a great influence on UK legislation.

== List of reports ==
- First Report: Indecency with Children (Cmnd 835) (1959)
- Second Report: Suicide (Cmnd 1187) (1960)
- Third Report: Criminal Procedure (Insanity) (Cmnd 2149) (1963)
- Fourth Report: Order of Closing Speeches (Cmnd 2148) (1963)
- Fifth Report: Criminal Procedure (Jurors) (Cmnd 2349) (1964)
- Seventh Report: Felonies and Misdemeanours (Cmnd 2659) (1965)
- Eighth Report: Theft and Related Offences (Cmnd 2977) (1966)
- Ninth Report: Evidence (written statements, formal admissions, and notices of alibi) (Cmnd 3145) (1966)
- Tenth Report: Secrecy of Jury Room (Cmnd 3750) (1968)
- Eleventh Report: Evidence (General) (Cmnd 4991) (1972)
- Twelfth Report: Penalty for Murder (Cmnd 5184) (1973)
- Thirteenth Report: Section 16 of the Theft Act 1968 (Cmnd 6733) (1977) (ISBN 9780113405688)
- Fourteenth Report: Offences against the Person (Cmnd 7844) ((1980) ISBN 9780101784405)
- Fifteenth Report: Sexual Offences (Cmnd 9213) (1984) (ISBN 9780101921305)
- Sixteenth Report: Prostitution in the Street (Cmnd 9329) (1984) (ISBN 9780101932905)
- Seventeenth Report: Prostitution: Off Street Activities (Cmnd 9688) (1985)
- Eighteenth Report: Conspiracy to Defraud (Cmnd 9873) (1986) (ISBN 9780101987301)

The seventh report was implemented by the Criminal Law Act 1967 and the Criminal Law Act (Northern Ireland) 1967. The eighth report was implemented by the Theft Act 1968 and the Theft Act (Northern Ireland) 1969.

== See also ==
- Law reform
- Royal Commission on the Criminal Law (1833-1845)
- Royal Commission on Revising and Consolidating the Criminal Law (1845-1849)
- Royal Commission for Revising and Consolidating the Criminal Law (1871–1879)
- Royal Commission on Criminal Procedure (1978-1981)
- Royal Commission on Criminal Justice (1991-1993)
- Law Commission of England and Wales
- Criminal Law Reform Now Network (CLRNN)
