= Thomas Starkie =

English lawyer and jurist (1782–1849)

Thomas Starkie (2 January 1782 – 15 April 1849) was an English lawyer and jurist. A talented mathematician in his youth, he especially contributed to the unsuccessful attempts to codify the English criminal law in the nineteenth century.

== Early life ==
Born in Blackburn, Lancashire, Thomas was the eldest son of the Rev. Thomas Starkie, vicar of Blackburn, and his wife, Ann née Yatman. He was educated at Clitheroe Royal Grammar School and St John's College, Cambridge, from where he graduated in 1803 as senior wrangler and first Smith's prizeman. In the same year, he became a Fellow of St Catharine's College, Cambridge. In 1812 he married Lucy, eldest daughter of Rev. Thomas Dunham Whitaker which entailed that he resign his fellowship. The couple went on to parent five children.

== Legal practice ==
Starkie entered Lincoln's Inn as a pupil of Joseph Chitty and was called to the bar in 1810, proceeding to practise as a special pleader as well as on the northern circuit, and becoming a QC.

In 1823 he became Downing Professor of law at Cambridge though he had little success in attracting pupils with his poor presentations, a fate shared with his contemporary John Austin. He repeated his failure at the Inner Temple in 1833.

In 1833, Starkie was appointed to the Royal Commission on the Criminal Law 1833, a royal commission to consolidate existing statutes of criminal law into an English Criminal Code. In 1845, Starkie was appointed to the Royal Commission on the Criminal Law 1845, a royal commission to complete the unfinished report of the Commission of 1833, to consider amendments and consolidations of the criminal law and to prepare a bill for that purpose. Starkie spent the rest of his life on various commissions on reform and codification of the criminal law. He was not always popular with his colleagues, Henry Bellenden Ker calling him "childish" and "desultory and wayward".

He was also a sometime law reporter and author of the influential texts: A Practical Treatise on the Law of Slander, Libel, and Incidentally of Malicious Prosecutions (1812) and A Practical Treatise on the Law of Evidence (1824). In 1847, Starkie became a judge in the Clerkenwell County Court.

== Politics ==
Starkie's instincts were Tory and he opposed the Roman Catholic Relief Act 1829. However, in 1840 he unsuccessfully stood as a Liberal Party candidate in Cambridge.

== Death ==
Starkie died on 15 April 1849 in his rooms in Downing College, Cambridge.

== Bibliography ==
- Obituaries:
  - Gentleman's Magazine, 2nd ser., 32 (1849), 208;
  - Law Review, 10 (1849), 201–4

- Lobban, M. (2004) "Starkie, Thomas (1782–1849)", Oxford Dictionary of National Biography, Oxford University Press, accessed 9 Aug 2007 (subscription required)
