= William Oldnall Russell =

Judge in India

Sir William Oldnall Russell (1785– 22 January 1833) was the Chief Justice of the Supreme Court at Calcutta.

== Life ==
He was born in 1785, the eldest son of Samuel Oldnall, rector of St. Nicholas, Worcester, and North Piddle, and Mary, daughter of William Russell of Powick. In 1816, in accordance with the will of his maternal grandfather, he took the surname of Russell. He matriculated at Christ Church, Oxford, on 22 December 1801, and was a student till 1812. He graduated B.A. in 1804 and M.A. in 1807. He was called to the bar at Lincoln's Inn in 1809, became serjeant-at-law on 25 June 1827, and Chief Justice of Bengal in 1832, when he was knighted.

Russell died on 22 January 1833. He had married, in 1825, Louisa Maria, daughter of John Lloyd Williams, and left children.

== Works ==
Russell's Treatise on Crimes and Misdemeanours, which appeared in 2 vols. in 1819, was pronounced by Samuel Warren "the best general treatise in criminal law". A second edition appeared in 1827; a third, edited by C. S. Greaves, in 1843, with a supplement in 1851; a fourth, in 3 vols., in 1865; and a fifth, edited by S. Prentice, Q.C., in 1877. The American editions, of which seven were issued between 1824 and 1853, did not reproduce the whole work.

Russell also published:

- Practice in the Court of Great Sessions on the Caermarthen Circuit ... also the Mode of levying a Fine and of suffering a Recovery ... To which are added Rules of that Circuit, and some Precedents of Practical Forms, 3 pts., 1814.
- With (Sir) Edward Ryan, Crown Cases reserved and decided by Twelve Judges of England, 1799-1824, 1825; republished in John William Wallace's British Crown Cases reserved.
