= Andrew Amos (lawyer) =

British lawyer and professor

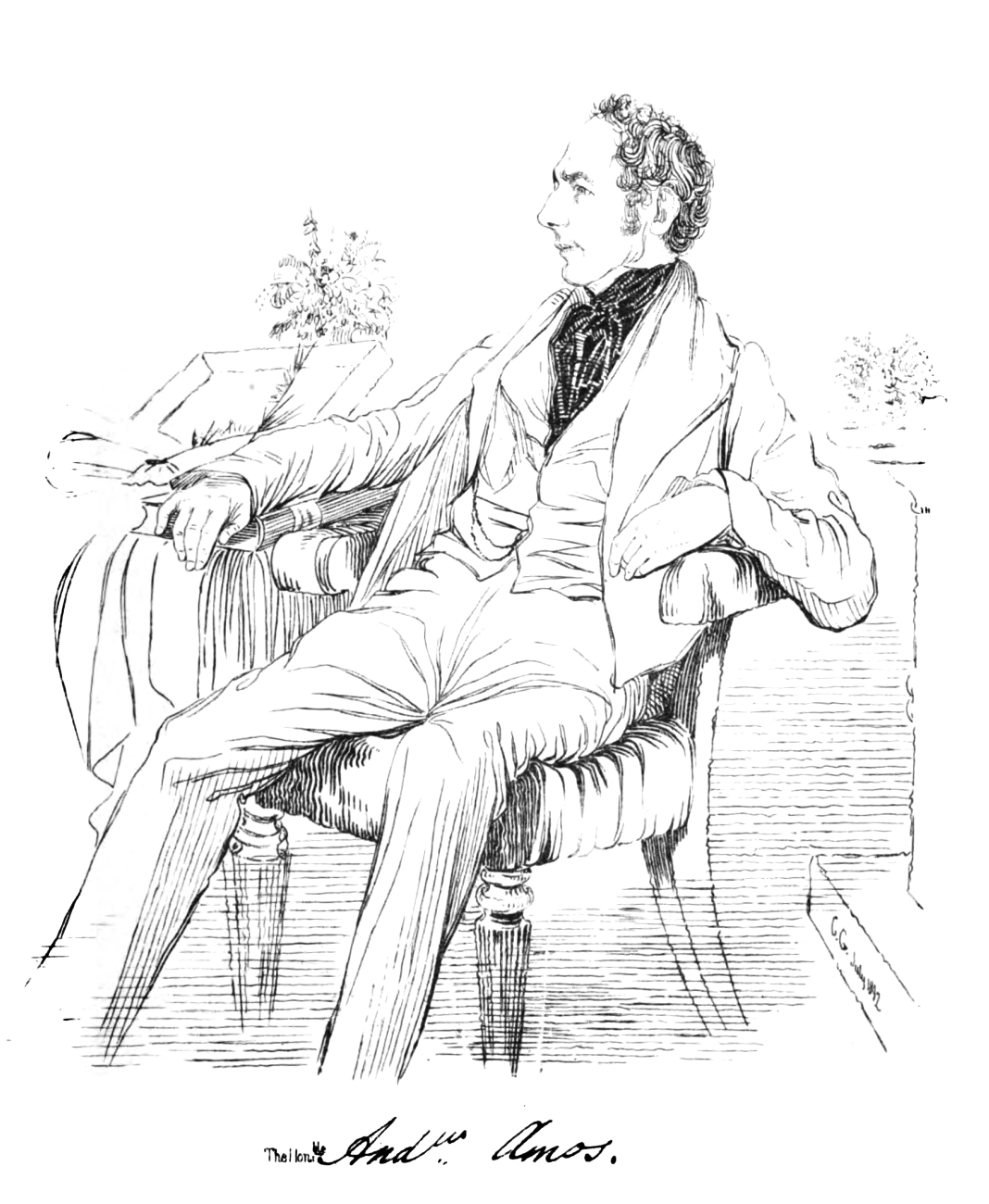
- Portrait by Colesworthey Grant
- Born: 1791; India
- Died: April 18, 1860 (aged 68–69)
- Occupations: lawyer, judge, professor of law

Andrew Amos (1791 – 18 April 1860) was a British lawyer, judge, and professor of law.

== Early life and education ==
Amos was born in 1791 in India, where his father, James Amos, a Russian merchant, of Devonshire Square, London, who had travelled there, had married Cornelia Bonté, daughter of a Swiss general officer in the Dutch service. The family was Scottish, and took its name in the time of the Covenanters. Andrew Amos was educated at Eton and at Trinity College, Cambridge, of which he became a fellow, after graduating as fifth wrangler in 1813.

== Legal career ==
Amos was called to the bar by the Middle Temple and joined the Midland circuit, where he soon acquired a reputation for rare legal learning, and his personal character secured him a large arbitration practice. On 1 August 1826, he married Margaret, daughter of the Rev. William Lax, Lowndean Professor of Astronomy at the University of Cambridge.

Within the next eight years Amos became auditor of Trinity College, Cambridge; recorder of Oxford, Nottingham, and Banbury; fellow of the new University of London; and criminal law commissioner.

In 1833, Amos was appointed to the Royal Commission on the Criminal Law 1833, a royal commission to consolidate existing statutes of criminal law into an English Criminal Code. The commission was renewed at intervals between 1834 and 1843, Amos being always a member of it. Seven reports were issued, the seventh report, of 1843, containing a complete criminal code, systematically arranged into chapters, sections, and articles. The historical and constitutional aspects of the subject received minute attention at every point, and the perplexed topic of criminal punishments was considered in all its relations. Amos's correspondence with the Chief Justice of Australia in reference to the penal transportation system partially appears in the report, and he was consulted by the Chief Justice as to the extension of trial by jury under the peculiar circumstances of the settlement.

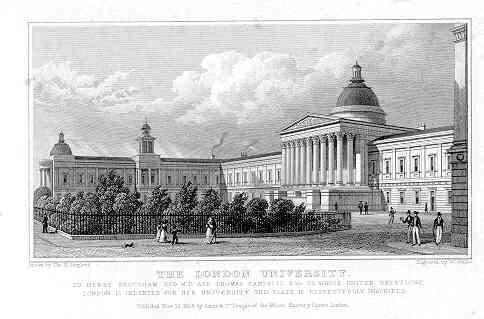
The London University (1827–1828) by Thomas Hosmer Shepherd. Amos was the first professor of English law at London University upon its establishment in 1826. The institution is now called University College London and is part of the University of London.

On the foundation of London University (now called University College London), Amos was first professor of English law, with Austin, professor of jurisprudence, as his colleague. Between 1829 and 1837 Amos's lectures attained great celebrity. It was the first time that lectures on law at convenient hours had been made accessible to both barristers and solicitors, and Amos's class sometimes included as many as 150 students. Amos encouraged his classes by propounding subjects for essays, by free and informal conversation, by repeated examinations, and by giving prizes for special studies, as, for instance, for the study of Edward Coke's writings. He repeatedly received testimonials from his pupils, and his bust was presented to University College.

In 1837 Amos was appointed "fourth member" of the council of the Governor-General of India, in succession to Lord Macaulay, and for the next five years he took an active part in rendering the code sketched out by his predecessor practically workable. He also took a part as a member of the "law commission" in drafting the report on slavery in India which resulted in the adoption of measures for its gradual extinction. The commissioners were unanimous on the leading recommendation that "it would be more beneficial for the slaves themselves, as well as a wiser and safer course, to direct immediate attention to the removal of the abuses of slavery than to recommend its sudden and abrupt abolition". Amos, with two commissioners, differed from the remaining two as to the remedies to be proposed. The majority inclined to leave untouched the lawful status of slavery, and with it the lawful power of the master to punish and restrain. They thought this power necessary as a check to the propensity to idleness which the situation of the slave naturally produces.

At the close of Amos's term in India, he was forced into an official controversy with Lord Ellenborough, the Governor-General, as to the right of the "fourth member" to sit at all meetings of the council in a political as well as a legislative capacity. When Lord Ellenborough's general official conduct was brought under the notice of the House of Commons, his alleged discourtesy to Amos was used as an argument in the debate by Lord John Russell, but this controversy was closed by the production by Sir Robert Peel of a private letter given to him without authorisation in which Amos incidentally spoke of his social relations in his usual way. It was a lasting political misfortune for Amos that by this misadventure his political adversaries won the day in a debate of the first importance.

On Amos's return to England in 1843 he was nominated one of the first county court judges, his circuit being that of Marylebone, Brentford, and Brompton. In 1848 he was elected Downing Professor of the Laws of England at Cambridge, an office he held till his death on 18 April 1860.

== Literary career ==
Amos was throughout life a persistent student, and published various books of importance on legal, constitutional, and literary subjects.

His first book was an examination into certain trials in the courts in Canada relative to the destruction of the Earl of Selkirk's settlement on the Red River. It had been alleged that in June 1816 the servants of the North West Company had destroyed that settlement and murdered Governor Temple and twenty of his people. A few accused persons were brought to trial before the courts of law in Upper Canada, and they were all acquitted. Amos reproduced and criticised the proceedings at some of these trials, and denounced the state of things as one "to which no British colony had hitherto afforded a parallel, private vengeance arrogating the functions of public law; murder justified in a British court of judicature, on the plea of exasperation commencing years before the sanguinary act; the spirit of monopoly raging in all the terrors of power, in all the force of organisation, in all the insolence of impunity".

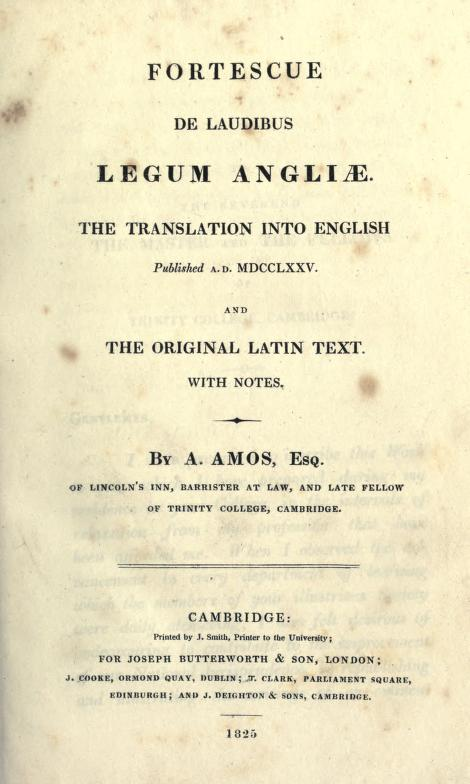
The title page of John Fortescue's De Laudibus Legum Angliæ: The Translation into English Published A.D. MDCCLXXV (1825), which Amos edited

In 1825 Amos edited for the syndics of the University of Cambridge John Fortescue's De Laudibus Legum Angliæ, appending the English translation of 1775, and original notes, or rather dissertations, by himself. These notes are full of antiquarian research into the history of English law. His name is familiar in the legal world through the treatise on the law of fixtures, which he published in concert with Joseph Ferard in 1827 when the law on the subject was wholly unsettled, never having been treated systematically. He found a congenial part of his task to consist in the examination of the legal history of heirlooms, charters, crown jewels, deer, fish, and "things" annexed to the freehold of the church, such as mourning hung in the church, tombstones, pews, organs, and bells.

He had shared with Samuel March Phillipps the task of bringing out a treatise on the law of evidence, and had taken upon himself the whole charge of the preparation of the eighth edition, published in 1838; when, in 1837, he went to India, he had not quite finished the work.

In 1846 he wrote The Great Oyer of Poisoning, an account of the trial of Robert Carr, 1st Earl of Somerset, for poisoning Sir Thomas Overbury, a subject bearing on the constitutional aspects of state trials. In the same year he dedicated to his lifelong friend, William Whewell, Four Lectures on the Advantages of a Classical Education, as an Auxiliary to a Commercial Education.

Among his purely constitutional treatises may be mentioned Ruins of Time exemplified in Sir Matthew Hale's Pleas of the Crown (1856). The object of this was to advocate the adoption of a code of criminal law. In 1857 followed The English Constitution in the Reign of King Charles the Second, and in 1859 Observations on the Statutes of the Reformation Parliament in the Reign of King Henry the Eighth, in which he presented a different view of the subject from that of the corresponding chapters of Mr. Froude's History, which had then lately appeared.

Among his purely literary works may be mentioned Gems of Latin Poetry (1851), a collection, with notes, of choice Latin verses of all periods, and illustrating remarkable actions and occurrences, "biography, places, and natural phenomena, the arts, and inscriptions". In 1858 he published Martial and the Moderns, a translation into English prose of select epigrams of Martial arranged under heads with examples of the uses to which they had been applied.

He published various introductory lectures on diverse parts of the laws of England, and pamphlets on various subjects, such as the constitution of the new county courts, the expediency of admitting the testimony of parties to suits, and other measures of legal reform.

Amos's political and philosophical convictions were those of an advanced liberalism qualified by a profound knowledge of the constitutional development of the country and of the sole conditions under which the public improvements for which he longed and lived could alone be hopefully attempted. Though he was in constant communication with the leading reformers of his day, and was a candidate for Kingston upon Hull on the passing of the Reform Bill in 1832, he concerned himself little at any time with strictly party politics.

== Selected works ==
=== Law ===
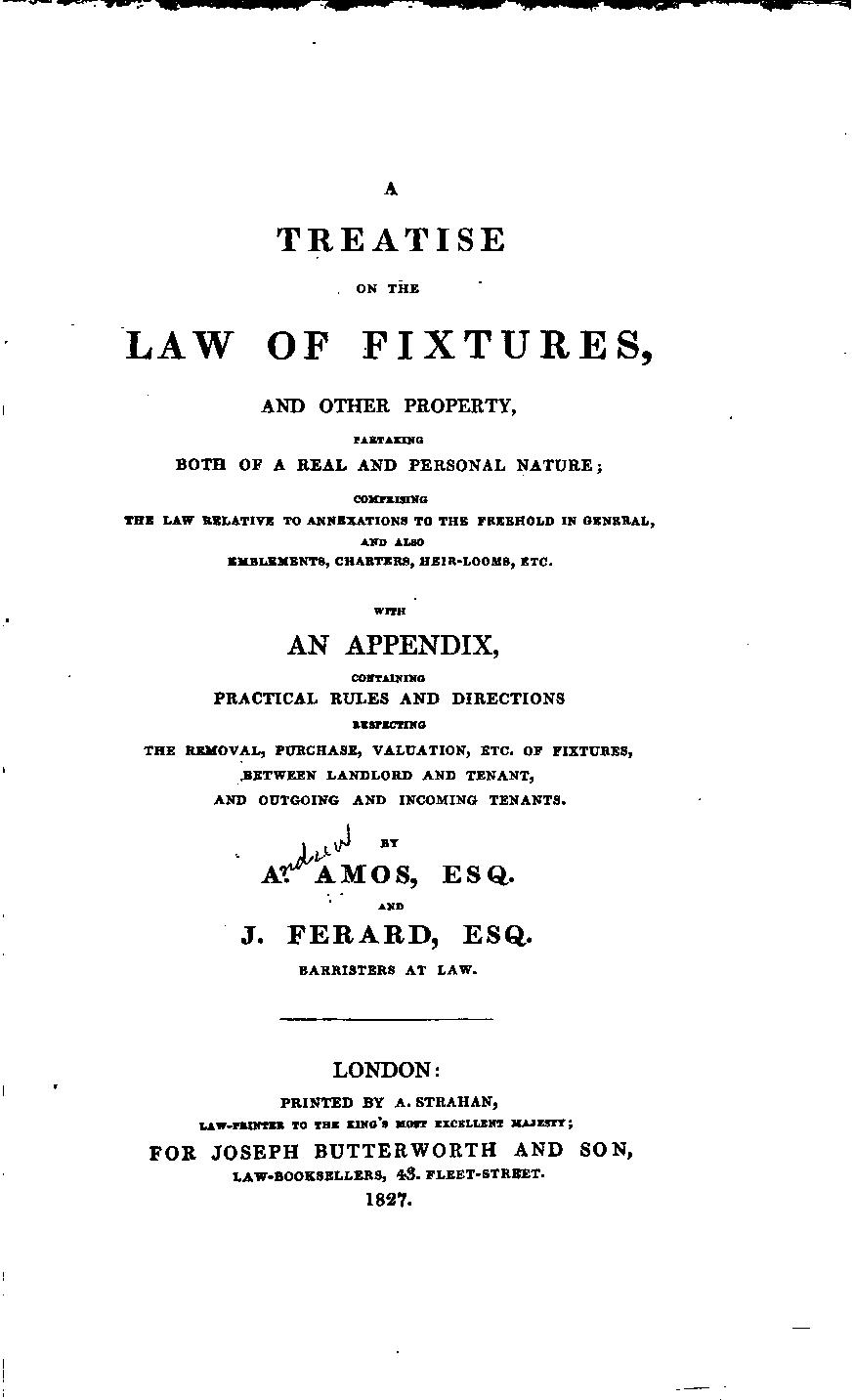
The title page of A Treatise on the Law of Fixtures (1827) by Andrew Amos and Joseph Ferard

- Amos, Andrew (1820), Report of Trials in the Courts of Canada Relative to the Destruction of the Earl of Selkirk's Settlement on the Red River: With Observations, London: John Murray, OCLC 506032399.
- Amos, Andrew (1823), Observations on the Case of the King and Geddington, Relative to the Law of Parochial Settlement by Equitable Estate, London: A. Maxwell, OCLC 54781513.
- Amos, Andrew; Ferard, Joseph (1827), A Treatise on the Law of Fixtures, and other Property, Partaking both of a Real and Personal Nature; Comprising the Law Relative to Annexations to the Freehold in General, and also Emblements, Charters, Heir-looms, etc. With an Appendix, Containing Practical Rules and Directions Respecting the Removal, Purchase, Valuation, etc. of Fixtures, between Landlord and Tenant, and Outgoing and Incoming Tenants, London: John Butterworth and Son, OCLC 60719569.
- Amos, Andrew (1829), An Introductory Lecture upon the Study of English Law: Delivered in the University of London on Monday, November 2, 1829, London: J. Taylor, OCLC 60718719.
- Amos, Andrew (1830), On the Study of English Law: An Introductory Lecture Delivered in the University of London, on Monday, November 8, 1830, London: J. Taylor, OCLC 60719388.
- Amos, Andrew (1846), The Great Oyer of Poisoning: The Trial of the Earl of Somerset for the Poisoning of Sir Thomas Overbury in the Tower of London, and Various Matters Connected therewith from Contemporary Mss., London: Richard Bentley, OCLC 70336518.
- Amos, Andrew (1850), An Introductory Lecture on the Laws of England: Delivered in Downing College, Cambridge, on October 23, 1850, Cambridge: J. Deighton, OCLC 60719196.
- Amos, Andrew (1850), On the Expediency of Admitting the Testimony of Parties to Suits in the New County Courts and in the Courts of Westminster Hall: To which are Appended General Remarks Relative to the New County Courts, London; Cambridge: J. W. Parker; J. Deighton, OCLC 837384947.
- Amos, Andrew (1851), A Lecture on County Courts, Cambridge; London: J. Deighton; Stevens & Norton, OCLC 65099000.
- Amos, Andrew (1853), An Introductory Lecture on the Law of Property: Delivered in Downing College, Cambridge, on October 24, A.D. 1853, Cambridge: J. Deighton, OCLC 43012118.
- Amos, Andrew (1856), Ruins of Time Exemplified in Sir Matthew Hale's History of the Pleas of the Crown, London: V. & R. Stevens & G. S. Norton, OCLC 60714673.
- Amos, Andrew (1857), The English Constitution in the Reign of King Charles the Second, London: V. & R. Stevens & G. S. Norton, OCLC 60724718.
- Amos, Andrew (1859), Observations on the Statutes of the Reformation Parliament in the Reign of King Henry the Eighth, London: V. & R. Stevens & G. S. Norton, OCLC 60714662.

=== Other subjects ===
- Amos, Andrew (1846), Four Lectures on the Advantages of a Classical Education, as an Auxiliary to a Commercial Education: With a Letter to Dr. Whewell upon the Subject of his Tract 'On Liberal Education.', London: Richard Bentley, OCLC 20598341.
- Amos, Andrew (1851), Gems of Latin Poetry, with Translations by Various Authors, Cambridge; London: J. Deighton; Bain, OCLC 10066687.
- Martial; Amos, Andrew (1858), Martial and the Moderns, Cambridge; London: Deighton, Bell and Co.; Bell and Daldy, OCLC 6561280.
