= Royal Commission on the Criminal Law =

Royal Commission for criminal law reform (1833–1845)

Royal Commission overview
- Formed: 23 July 1833
- Dissolved: February 22, 1845
- Superseding Royal Commission: Royal Commission on Revising and Consolidating the Criminal Law
- Jurisdiction: England and Wales
- Royal Commission executives: Andrew Amos, Commissioner; John Austin (resigned 1836), Commissioner; David Jardine (from 1836), Commissioner; Charles Henry Bellenden Ker, Commissioner; William Wightman, Commissioner; Thomas Starkie, Commissioner; James John Lonsdale, Secretary
- Key documents: First Report (24 June 1834); Second Report (20 June 1836); Third Report (6 April 1837); Fourth Report (8 March 1839; Fifth Report (22 April 1840); Sixth Report (3 May 1841); Seventh Report (11 March 1843); Eighth Report (5 July 1845)

The Royal Commission on the Criminal Law (also known as the Criminal Law Commission of 1833 or the Statute Law Commission of 1833) was a Royal Commission that ran from 1833 to 1845 to consolidate existing statutes and enactments of English criminal law, including an English Criminal Code.

The commission issued eight reports and was replaced by the Royal Commission on Revising and Consolidating the Criminal Law in 1845. There was also a later Royal Commission on the Law Relating to Indictable Offences (1871–1879).

== Background ==
The jurisdiction of England and Wales does not have a Criminal Code. In the early 19th century, Jeremy Bentham was the first person to be an aggressive advocate for the codification of all of the common law into a coherent set of statutes, coining the verb "to codify". Bentham died in 1832.

In the United Kingdom, Acts of Parliament remain in force until expressly repealed. Blackstone's Commentaries on the Laws of England, published in the late 18th century, raised questions about the system and structure of the common law and the poor drafting and disorder of the existing statute book. By the start of the 19th century, it was widely recognised that the criminal law stood in need of the greatest reform.

In 1806, the Commission on Public Records passed a resolution requesting the production of a report on the best mode of reducing the volume of the statute book. From 1810 to 1825, The Statutes of the Realm was published, providing for the first time the authoritative collection of acts. In 1816, both Houses of Parliament, passed resolutions that an eminent lawyer with 20 clerks be commissioned to make a digest of the statutes, which was declared "very expedient to be done." However, this was never done.

In the 1820s, the Home Secretary, Robert Peel, led reforms of the criminal statute book, known as Peel's Acts. In 1828, Henry Brougham MP made a famous six-hour speech in the House of Commons, considered to be the longest in the history of Parliament, which paid tribute to Bentham and set in motion reform of the British legal system. Following the fall of Wellington's administration, Brougham became Lord Chancellor and made codification a matter of official policy.

At the start of the parliamentary session in 1853, the Lord Chancellor, Lord Cranworth announced his intention to the improvement of the statute law, remarking that:

"I think it may be safely said that it is not creditable to any country that its statutes should be in such a condition. ... The great number is of itself a circumstance that affords an irresistible argument for the necessity of doing something, but independently of their enormous quantity, there are other reasons which suggest themselves. They are in a most repulsive form: there is no classification, but they are huddled together in the most complex fashion."

Lord Cranworth went further, proposing steps towards a Code Victoria:

"The mere enumeration of the statutes that have been repealed would be something; the consolidation of some of the statutes more easy to be dealt with would be something. To simplify our statutes and improve their style would be something,—would be a great deal. But I look further: I conceive there is no reason why this proposed step should not at some future time, some years hence, constitute the formation of that which I have always looked forward to as the most desirable, though hereto I have feared to be unattainable, a Code Victoria."

== Terms of reference ==
The commission was appointed by letters patent dated 23 July 1833 by the Lord Chancellor, Henry Brougham, 1st Baron Brougham and Vaux. The commission's terms of reference were:

- To digest into one statute the statutes touching crimes, and the trial and punishment thereof
- To digest into one other statute all the provisions of the common or unwritten law touching the same
- To inquire and report how far it might be expedient to combine both these statutes into one body of the criminal law, repealing all other statutory provisions, or of passing into a law the first-mentioned only of such statues.
- To inquire and report how for it might be convenient to consolidate the other branches of the existing statute law, or any of them

The commissioners were paid, and included:

- Andrew Amos
- John Austin
- Charles Henry Bellenden Ker
- William Wightman
- Thomas Starkie

The barrister James John Lonsdale was appointed Secretary to the commission.

Finding the work congenial and little support in his opinions, in 1836, Austin resigned after signing two reports. Austin was replaced by barrister David Jardine and the commission was re-appointed by letters patent dated 21 October 1836. Following the death of King William IV and the accession of Queen Victoria, the commission was re-appointed by letters patent dated 26 October 1837.

The commission was replaced Royal Commission on Revising and Consolidating the Criminal Law by letters patent on 22 February 1845, who completed and published the commission's eighth and final report.

== Proceedings ==
The commission made eight reports, dated 24 June 1834, 20 June 1836, 6 April 1837, 8 March 1839, 22 April 1840, 3 May 1841, 11 March 1843, and 5 July 1845.

The commission made a supplementary report on, dated 17 July 1835 and ordered to be printed on 20 July 1835, providing considerations on the expediency of the consolidation of the different branches of the statute law.

The commission proposed in its first report of 1834 emphatically endorsed the codification goal to unify existing common and statute law into a single legislative enactment, leading to criticism from academics. In this context, Samuel March Phillipps, under-secretary at the Home Office, wrote to the commissioners in 1835 to instruct them only to digest the statute law, telling Amos in private "that they wanted to steer clear of codification" The seventh report in 1843 revised this initial priority, emphasising the greater coherence and sophistication of the common law treatment of crime compared with the statute law, and the need in any legislation to preserve the superior achievements of the common law.

Although the main drafters of the substantive reports of the commission, Starkie and Ker did not get on well with one another, with Ker later describing him "childish" and "desultory and wayward".

=== First report ===
The commission issued its first report on 24 June 1834 on the common law of theft.

The commission also proposed to digest the criminal statute law and the common law under the following heads:

1. The defining of offences and punishments
2. The prevention of offences, or the continuance of offences by summary coercive means
3. Proceedings against offenders (otherwise than before magistrates exercising summary jurisdiction), and herein of—
  1. Indictments and other criminal charges
  2. Process against offenders
  3. Pleadings
  4. Jury process
  5. The course and order of trial, including evidence
  6. Proceedings in stay or bar of execution
  7. Judgment
  8. Execution
  9. Attainder, forfeiture, and other general incidents to conviction and judgement
4. Proceedings by attachment, and other summary proceedings of the Superior Courts
5. Summary proceedings before inferior magistrates

=== Second report ===
The commission issued its second report on 20 June 1836 on defence of prisoners by counsel and the infliction of the death penalty.

This followed a letter from the Home Secretary, Lord Viscount Melbourne, dated 8 July 1834 directing the commission to consider what "partial alterations may be necessary or expedient for more simply and completely defining Crimes and Punishments, and for the more effectual administration of Criminal Justice".

The commission also proposed a new structure for reporting:

1. The classification of crimes
2. The definitions:
  1. Of crimes
  2. Of punishments
3. The jurisdiction of courts
4. The process of accusation, inquiry, judgment and execution

=== Third report ===
The commission issued its third report on 6 April 1837 on the trial of juvenile offenders.

This followed a Letter from the Home Secretary, Lord John Russell, dated 23 November 1836 directing the commission to consider "whether it would be advisable to make any distinction in the Mode of Trial between Adult and Juvenile Offenders; and if not, whether any class of Offenders can be made subject to a more summary proceeding than trial by Jury; and to furnish an early and separate Report to be laid".

The commission recommended that it would not be advisable to make a distinction between the mode of trial between adult and juvenile offenders, except by increasing the summary jurisdiction of magistrates and that the extension of such summary jurisdiction, subject to certain limits, would be a safe and beneficial alteration of the law that would materially diminish juvenile crime.

=== Fourth report ===
The commission issued its fourth report on 8 March 1839 on crimes against person and property.

Significantly, the Commission clarified at the start that their work differed from the production of a code:

"From the statement of authority under which we now act, it will be obvious that it does not extend to the construction of a new Criminal Code, but is limited to the reduction and consolidation of the existing Law of England, as well written as unwritten, concerning crimes"

=== Fifth report ===
The commission issued its fifth report on 22 April 1840, covering:

- Burglary
- Offences against the executive power, including administration of justice, the crimes of bribery, perjury, subordination of perjury, false swearing, embracery, barretry, maintenance and champerty
- Forgery
- Offences against the public peace, including riots, unlawful assemblies, affrays and forcible entries.

=== Sixth report ===
The commission issued its sixth report on 3 May 1841, covering:

- Treason and other offences against the state
- Offences against the Protestant establishment declared to be treasons and misprisions of treason
- Libel
- Offences against religion
- Offences relating to the coin
- Offences relating to the public revenue

=== Seventh report ===
The commission issued its seventh report on 11 March 1843, providing a digest of criminal law. The Report contained consolidation of remaining offences not included in former reports, observations and amendments on the present system of punishments and a revised completed digest of criminal law.

The commission provided a draft Act of Crimes and Punishments compromising 24 chapters, under the following heads:

1. Preliminary Declarations and Enactments
2. Treason and other Offences against the State
3. Offences against Religion and the Established Church
4. Offences against the Executive Power, generally
5. Offences against the Administration of Justice
6. Offences against the Public Peace
7. Offences relating to the Coin, and Bullion and Gold and Silver Plate
8. Offences relating to the Public Property, Revenue, and Funds
9. Offences against the Law of Marriage
10. Offences relating to Public Records and Registers
11. Offences against Public Morals and Decency
12. Offences against Public Health
13. Common Nuisances
14. Offences relating to Trade, Commerce, and Public Communication
15. Homicide, and other Offences against the Person
16. Libel
17. Offences against the Habitation
18. Fraudulent Appropriations
19. Piracy, and other Offences connected therewith
20. Malicious Injuries to Property
21. Forgery, and other Offences connected therewith
22. Illegal Solicitations, Conspiracies, Attempts, and Repetitions of Offences
23. Definitions of Terms, and Explanations
24. Chapter of Penalties

=== Eighth report ===
The commission issued its eighth and final report on 5 July 1845, providing a digest of criminal law procedure.

== Criticism ==
The commission made several reports, but it has been acknowledged that nothing grew out of them.

Legal aspects of the commission's reports were criticised, including by Chief Justice Nicholas Conyngham Tindal, who was initially sceptical about the commission's approach to digesting and potentially codifying the criminal law.

The commission incurred expenses of £37,158 16s. 10d., which was subject to criticism by legal academics and commentators, and by politicians, including Peter King MP and George Hadfield MP as part of an 1869 resolution criticising the expensive process of legal revision that had taken place over 36 years, costing the country over £80,000 without yielding substantial results.

== Influence ==
There is debate amongst academics on the influence of Jeremy Bentham on the commission's work.

Some argue that the commission was heavily guided by Bentham's theory of legislation and that despite never having their work enacted, the commission's main achievement "was that they succeeded in putting the new science of legislation at the centre of the modern understanding of the criminal law".

Others argue that Ker and Brougham's "talked of "codes" in a sense far removed from Bentham's pannomion [utilitarian code of law]" and that the Commission was explicitly against the kind of codification associated with Bentham.

== Legacy ==
By the point that the Commission issued its final report in 1845, the ambition for such a comprehensive legal was dissipating. The Tories were in government and the new Whig ministry led by John Russell in 1846 would not include Brougham. Lord Brougham introduced a bill embodying the digest, but it was withdrawn on an undertaking by Brougham's opponent, Lord Lyndhurst, that a second Commission would be appointed to revise it.

On 22 February 1845, a subsequent royal commission was appointed for similar purposes, known as the Royal Commission on Revising and Consolidating the Criminal Law. The commission issued six reports, including a draft Bill of an "Entire Digest of the written and unwritten Law relating to the Definition of Crimes and Punishment" that was introduced by Lord Brougham on 6 June 1848 but was not proceeded with.

In autumn of 1852, the Lord Chancellor, Edward Sugden, 1st Baron St Leonards, directed James John Lonsdale and Charles Greaves to prepare Bills for the codification of criminal law based on the reports of the Criminal Law Commissioners. Two major Bills based on the work of the Commission covering offences against the person and larceny were introduced in 1853 and continued under Lord Cranworth. The bills made no progress, principally because of the unanimously unfavourable judicial reaction to the prospect of the common law being embodied in statutory form.

Little remained of the Commissioner's work in Charles Greaves' Criminal Law Consolidation Acts 1861. However, the commission's reports were complemented and acknowledged by Greaves:

"[The reports contain a] vast mass of most valuable information, together with many observations on the different parts of the criminal law, which are well deserving consideration by any one who may turn his attention to the importance of that branch of the law."

At the start of the parliamentary session in 1853, Lord Cranworth announced his intention to the improvement of the statute law and in March 1853, appointed the Board for the Revision of the Statute Law to repeal expired statutes and continue consolidation, with a wider remit that included civil law. The Board issued three reports, recommending the creation of a permanent body for statute law reform. On 29 August 1854, the temporary Board was superseded by the Royal Commission for Consolidating the Statute Law. Recommendations made by the commission were implemented by the Repeal of Obsolete Statutes Act 1856 (19 & 20 Vict. c. 64), the Statute Law Revision Act 1861 (24 & 25 Vict. c. 101) and subsequent Statute Law Revision Acts.
