= Cornell Franklin =

American judge and politician (1892–1959)

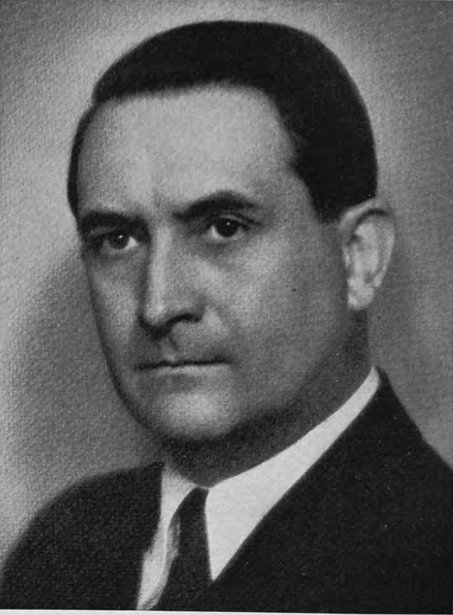

Chairman of the Shanghai Municipal Council
- In office April 1937 – April 1940
- Preceded by: Harry Edward Arnhold
- Succeeded by: William Johnston Keswick

Personal details
- Born: April 1, 1892 Columbus, Mississippi, United States
- Died: February 24, 1959 (aged 66) Charlottesville, Virginia
- Profession: lawyer

Cornell Sidney Franklin (1892–1959) was an American lawyer, judge and politician who served as the chairman of the Shanghai Municipal Council from 1937 to 1940.

== Early life ==
Franklin was born April 1, 1892, in Columbus, Mississippi, United States. He was the son of Cornell Samuel and Mary Wycoff (Taylor) Franklin. He was educated at the Franklin Academy from which he graduated in 1909 and the University of Mississippi where he obtained a BA in 1913 and an LLB in 1914.

== Legal practice in Hawaii ==
Franklin practiced law in Hawaii from 1914 to 1917. He then served as an assistant Attorney General of Hawaii from 1917 to 1918. In 1919, he was appointed First Judge of the First Judicial Circuit of Hawaii and served in that position until 1921 when he moved to Shanghai.

== Shanghai ==
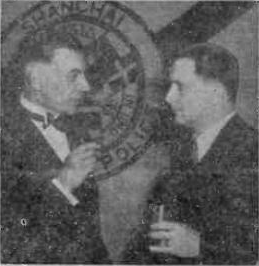
Franklin with G. Godfrey Phillips, Secretary of the SMC, in 1939

Franklin arrived in Shanghai on December 31, 1921, and commenced practice of law before the United States Court for China. In the 1920s he was in partnership with Walter Chalaire. After Chalaire returned to America, from 1928 he served as the senior member of the firm Fleming, Franklin & Allman).

A claim by Chalaire against Franklin was heard in the United States Court for China for the agreed price of the sale of the firm. Franklin won in Shanghai but lost on appeal to the United States Court of Appeals for the Ninth Circuit in San Francisco.

In 1933, Franklin was elected a member of Shanghai Municipal Council. In 1937 he was elected Chairman of the Council and served in that position for three years.

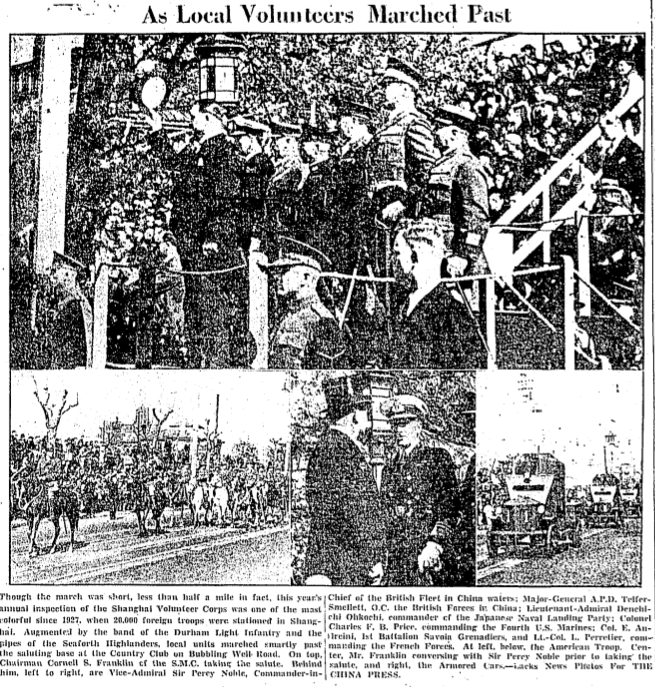
Cornell Franklin Civil Commandant of the Shanghai Volunteer Corps takes the salute in the 1938 Annual Parade

After the Japanese invasion of China in 1937, the Shanghai International Settlement was encircled by Japanese troops. Franklin along with the Secretary General of the Council, Stirling Fessenden were involved with a number of negotiations with the Japanese to maintain the independence of the International Settlement.

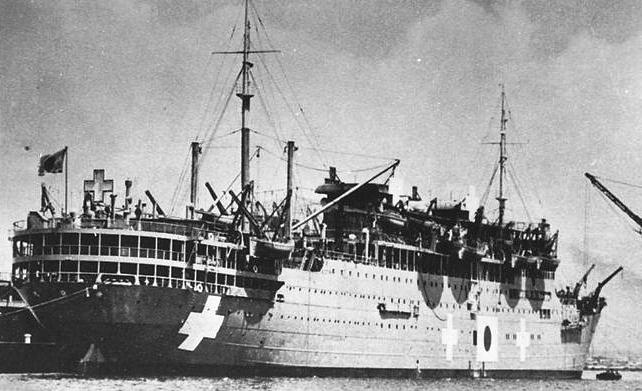
The Teia Maru, on which Franklin was repatriated

Franklin was interned by the Japanese during World War II; early in the morning of November 5, 1942, he was arrested by officers of the Kempeitai and held in the Haiphong Road Camp in Shanghai. He was repatriated from Shanghai in September, 1943 on the Japanese ship Teia Maru as part of the 1943 prisoner exchange. He returned to America on board the MS Gripsholm with other Americans after transferring in a Goa, India, then a Portuguese colony and a neutral port.

He returned to Shanghai after the war and resumed practice as a lawyer in partnership with Robert T Bryant, the former Shanghai Municipal Advocate. By this time extraterritoriality had come to an end and the United States Court for China no longer existed. Franklin stayed on after the Chinese Communist Revolution and was granted an exit visa in 1951. (Bryan was imprisoned for 18 months as a spy before being released via Hong Kong in 1952)

== Marriages and children ==
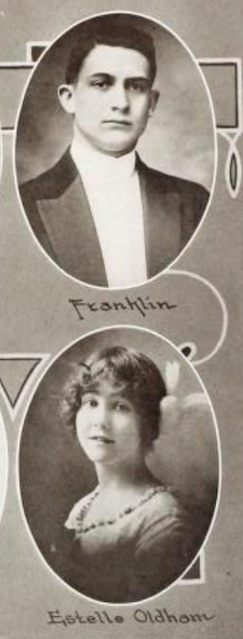
Franklin and Estelle Oldham at UMiss in 1913

Franklin married Estelle Oldham in April, 1918, and they had two children, Victoria and Malcom. Estelle left Shanghai in 1926 and divorced Franklin. She remarried in 1929 to the American writer, and later Nobel Prize winner, William Faulkner. Faulkner had courted Estelle before she married Franklin.

Franklin remarried in 1929 to Dallas Chesterman Lee in Shanghai with whom he had two sons, Cornell Swinton who was born on 16 March 1931 and died as an infant on 31 March 1931 and Cornell Jr. "Corney" Franklin born on 3 October 1933 at 200 Jordan Avenue Shanghai.

Notably, Victoria received a present from William Faulkner, The Wishing Tree, his only book written for children.

== Military service ==
Franklin was a First Lieutenant of the US Army Infantry from 1918 to 1919 during World War I in Hawaii. He was one of the three organisers of the American Troop of the Shanghai Volunteer Corps and served as a First Lieutenant of the Corps.

== Death ==
Franklin died in February 1959, in Charlottesville, Virginia. He was buried in the Friendship Cemetery in Columbus, Mississippi.
