= Edward Ryan (barrister) =

English lawyer, judge, reformer and patron of science

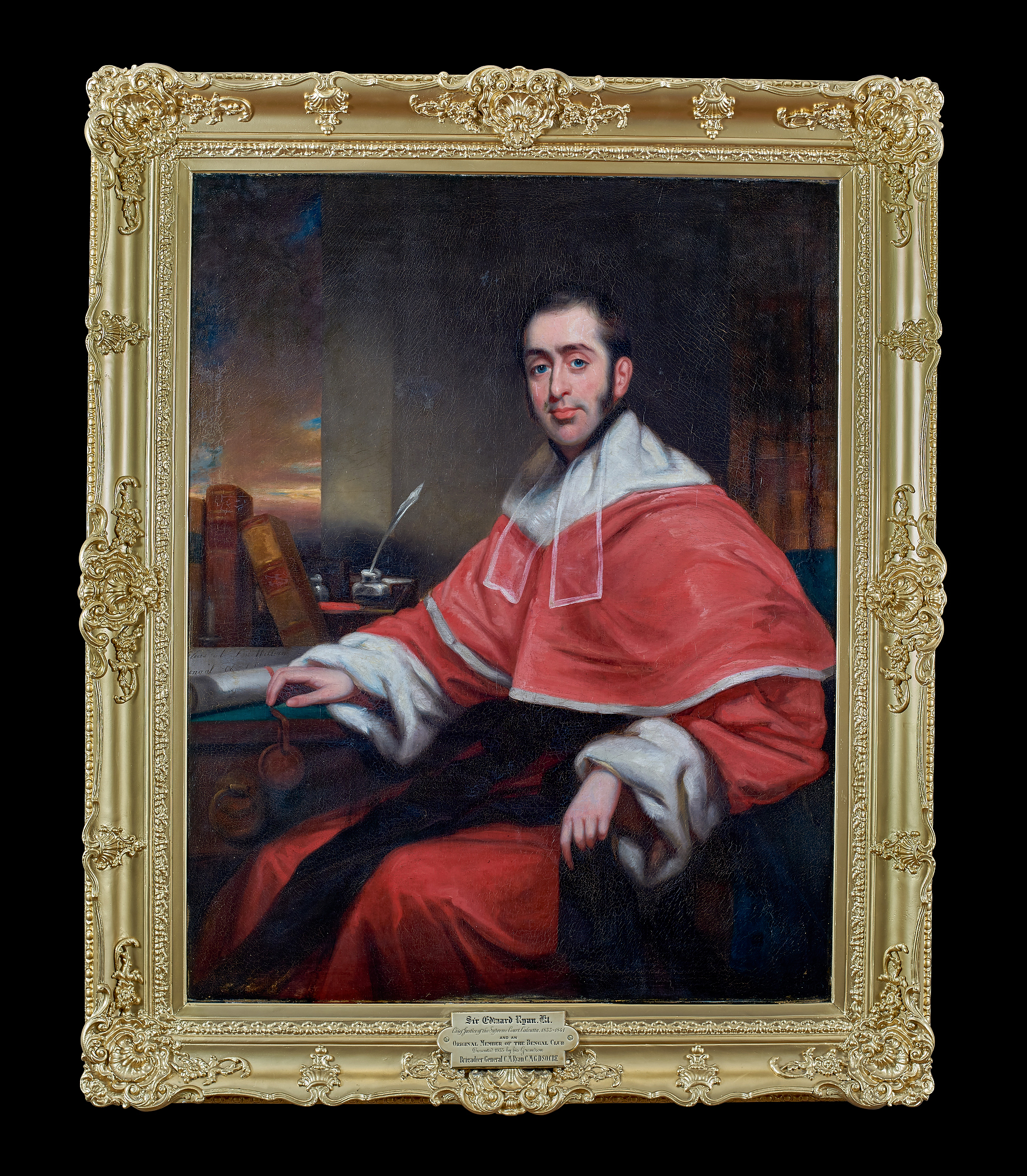
Portrait of Sir Edward Ryan

Sir Edward Ryan PC FRS (28 August 1793 – 22 August 1875) was an English lawyer, judge, reformer of the British Civil Service and patron of science. He served as Chief Justice of Bengal from 1833–43.

== Early life ==
Ryan was the second son of William Ryan. He graduated from Trinity College, Cambridge in 1814 and while at Cambridge, he became friends with John Herschel, Charles Babbage, and George Peacock. Ryan took his MA in 1817 and was called to the bar by Lincoln's Inn in the same year. It was Herschel's sharing of his scientific interests and enthusiasms that encouraged Ryan to join the Royal Astronomical Society in 1820.

He practised on the Oxford Circuit and published a volume of law reports jointly with William Oldnall Russell titled Crown cases reserved for consideration; and decided by the Twelve judges of England, from the year 1799 to the year 1824 before being appointed a puisne judge in the Calcutta supreme court in Bengal, then an English colony (see: Company Rule in India, 1757–1857: Justice system), an appointment which carried the customary knighthood.

However, he would complete another book, this time with William Moody, titled Reports of cases determined at Nisi Prius, in the Courts of King's Bench and Common Pleas: and on the Oxford and Western circuits from the sittings after Michaelmas term, 4 Geo. IV. 1823 to the sittings after Trinity term, 7 Geo. IV. 1826, inclusive before he left for India.

== India ==
Ryan arrived in India in 1827 and soon established something of a salon. Victor Jacquemont was a visitor in 1829. Ryan was a keen patron of science, presiding over agricultural and horticultural societies, and a supporter of the Society for the Diffusion of Useful Knowledge.

Secretary to the Board of Control Thomas Babington Macaulay had drafted a criminal code for India and Ryan's support won him Macaulay's affection. Governor-General Lord William Bentinck was also well-disposed and when William Oldnall Russell, his old law-report collaborator, died in 1833, Ryan was appointed Chief Justice of Bengal in his stead.

He took sides with Macaulay and Charles Trevelyan in their campaign that education in India should be improved by the widespread teaching of English to give the population access to the educational and instructional materials of the English-speaking world. From 1835, the three served together on the general committee of public education until Macaulay and Trevelyan left for England in 1838 when Ryan took over as president of the committee.

== England ==
Ryan resigned as Chief Justice and returned to England in January 1843 with the intention of acting as assessor to the Judicial Committee of the Privy Council on appeals from the Indian courts. Consequently, he was sworn a Privy Councillor.

In 1850, Ryan was appointed a permanent member of the Judicial Committee, serving until 1865.

In 1845, Ryan was appointed to the Royal Commission on the Criminal Law 1845, a royal commission to complete the unfinished report of the Royal Commission on the Criminal Law 1833, to consider amendments and consolidations of the criminal law and to prepare a bill for that purpose.

In 1846, Ryan was appointed Railway Commissioner.

In 1850, Trevelyan campaigned along with Charles Hay Cameron for the opening of the Indian Civil Service to the native population and championed the appointment of Soorjo Coomar Goodeve Chuckerbutty to the Bengal medical service.

In 1851, Ryan was appointed Assistant Controller of the Exchequer, serving until 1862.

== Civil Service Commission ==
The Northcote–Trevelyan Report in 1854 had characterised the British Civil Service as riddled with cronyism and hampered by the inefficiencies of patronage. The report had recommended access to the higher ranks of the service by open competition and public examination. Ryan became the inaugural First Civil Service Commissioner in 1855 with the task of implementing the reforms, and immediately faced the establishment backlash. However, Ryan was both intelligent and tactful and managed to supervise the trialling, evaluation and gradual introduction of universal tests by 1870. The commission also supervised exams for admission to the Indian Civil Service and the British Army.

== Family ==
On 13 December 1814, Ryan married Louisa Whitmore (1789–1866) the daughter of William Whitmore and Frances Barbara Lyster. His friend, Charles Babbage, married her sister, Georgiana (1792–1827), in the same year, making the men brothers-in-law. The Ryans had eight sons and three daughters:

- Edmund Burke Ryan (1815–1850)
- Frances Hanway Ryan (1817–)
- Lousia Ryan (1818–1906)
- John Cavendish Ryan (1819–1822)
- Wolryche Whitmore Ryan (1821–1867)
- Mary Ann Ryan (1822–)
- Colonel Edward Moody Ryan (1824–), of the Bengal army
- Robert Henry Ryan (1825–)
- Fredrick York Ryan (1827–1829)
- Sir Charles Lister Ryan (1831–1920), comptroller and auditor-general
- Colonel William Cavendish Bentinck Ryan (1833–1894) also of the Bengal army, named for the Governor-General of India

Ryan died on 22 August 1875 at Dover. and is buried at Kensal Green Cemetery, London.

== Honours and offices ==
- Fellow of the Royal Astronomical Society, (1820);
- Bencher of Lincoln's Inn, (1844);
- Fellow of the Royal Geographical Society, (1846);
- Member of the senate of the University of London, (1846–1875);
  - Vice-chancellor, (1871–1874);
- Member of the council of University College London;
- Member of the Council of Legal Education, (1852);
- Fellow of the Royal Society, (1860).

== Bibliography ==
- Obituary:
  - The Times, 25 August 1875, 1, 7; 8 October 1875
- Prior, K. (2006) "Ryan, Sir Edward (1793–1875)", Oxford Dictionary of National Biography, Oxford University Press, online edn, accessed 19 August 2007 (subscription, Wikipedia Library access or UK public library membership required) The first edition of this text is available at Wikisource: "Ryan, Edward (1793-1875)" . Dictionary of National Biography. London: Smith, Elder & Co. 1885–1900.

Government offices
Preceded by none	First Civil Service Commissioner; 1862–1875	Succeeded by The Lord Hampton
