= Godfrey Phillips =

Godfrey Phillips may refer to:

- G. Godfrey Phillips (1900-1965), Commissioner General of the Shanghai Municipal Council
- Godfrey Phillips India, tobacco company
