= David Jardine (barrister) =

David Jardine (1794–1860) was an English barrister and magistrate, known as a historical and legal writer.

== Life ==
Born at Pickwick, near Bath, Somerset, he was son of David B. Jardine (1766–1797), Unitarian minister at Bath from 1790, by his wife, a daughter of George Webster of Hampstead. The father died on 10 March 1797, and John Prior Estlin of Bristol edited, with a memoir, two volumes of his sermons.

David Jardine graduated M.A.in 1813 from Glasgow University where he studied, amongst other subjects, civil law and adhered to the 1707 Protestant Religion and Presbyterian Church Act.

Abandoning the career of his minister father, Jardine was eventually called to the bar as a member of the Middle Temple (7 February 1823). Choosing the western circuit, he became recorder of Bath.

In 1836, Jardine was appointed to the Statute Law Commission of 1833, a royal commission to consolidate existing statutes of criminal law into an English Criminal Code, replacing philosopher John Austin who had resigned due to disagreements in opinion.

In 1839 he was appointed police magistrate at Bow Street Magistrates' Court, London.

He died at the Heath, Weybridge, Surrey, on 13 September 1860; his wife, Sarah, died three weeks later.

== Works ==
With fellow lawyer Edgar Taylor, Jardine made the anonymous translations in German Popular Stories (1823), the first English translation of Grimms' Fairy Tales.

In 1828 Jardine published a General Index to Thomas Bayly Howell's Collection of State Trials. In 1840 and 1841 he communicated to the Society of Antiquaries of London two papers of Remarks upon the Letters of Thomas Winter and the Lord Mounteagle, lately discovered by J. Bruce. … Also upon the Evidence of Lord Mounteagle's implication in the Gunpowder Treason. These formed the materials for A Narrative of the Gunpowder Plot, London, 1857.

Jardine edited from a manuscript in the Bodleian Library A Treatise of Equivocation, 1851, and translated F. C. F. von Mueffling's Narrative of my Missions in 1829 and 1830, 1855. For the Society for the Diffusion of Useful Knowledge he selected and abridged from Howell's State Trials of England two volumes of Criminal Trials, 1832–3 (in the Library of Entertaining Knowledge). To the Lives of Eminent Persons, in the Library of Useful Knowledge, published by the same society, he contributed a Life of Lord Somers.

He wrote also:

- A Reading on the use of Torture in the Criminal Law of England previously to the Commonwealth, London, 1837
- Remarks on the Law and Expediency of requiring the presence of Accused Persons at Coroners' Inquisitions, London, 1846.
