= William Wightman (judge) =

British judge

Sir William Wightman
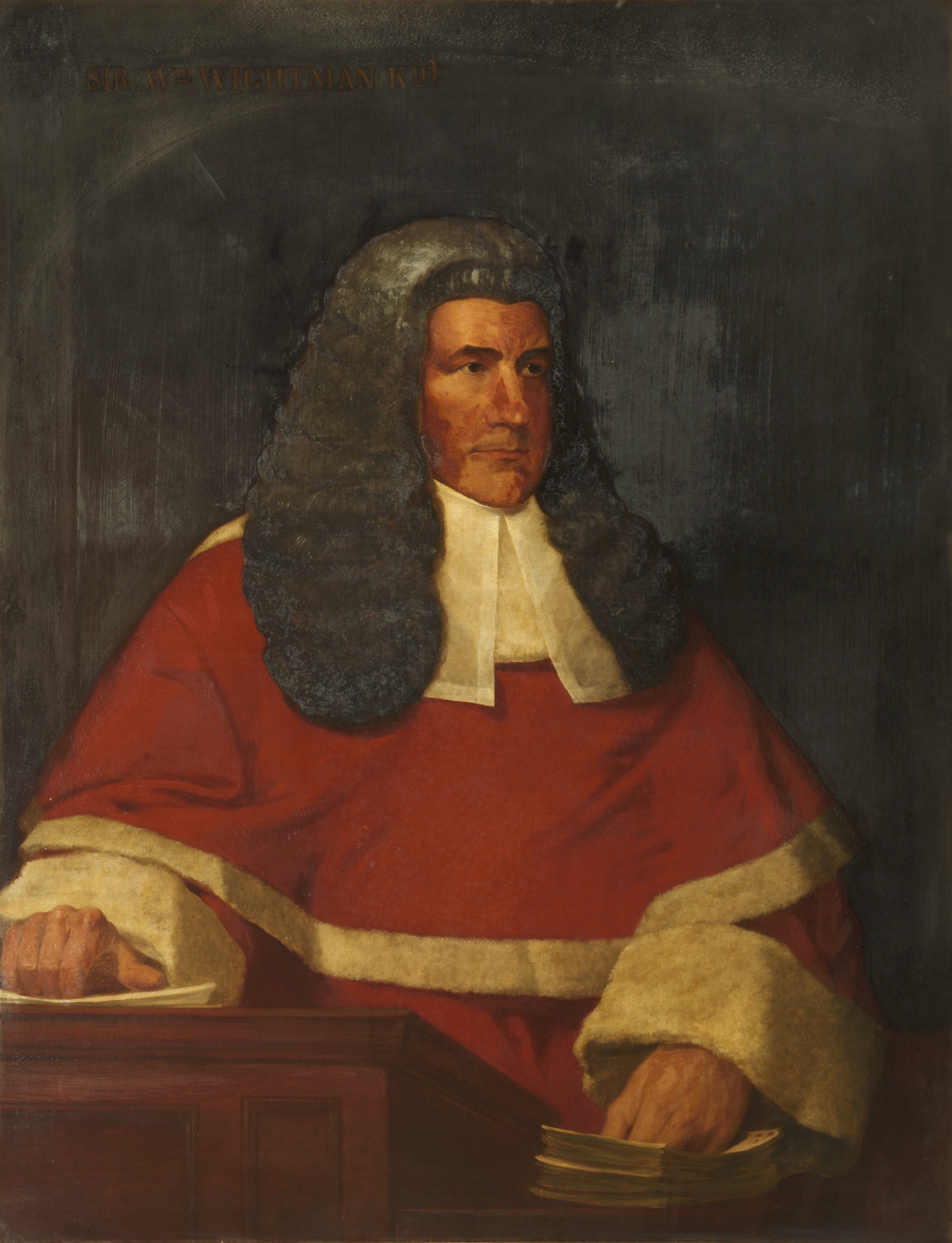
- Painting of Sir William Wightman by William Yellowlees In the collections of The Queen's College, Oxford.

Justice of the Queen's Bench
- In office 15 February 1841 – 10 December 1863

Sir William Wightman (28 September 1784 – 10 December 1863) was a British judge.

== Life ==
Wightman came of an old Dumfriesshire family, the son of William Wightman, gentleman, of St. Clement's, London, and his wife, Elisabeth. He was baptised at St Clement Danes at nearly 1 year old. He was an undergraduate of University College, Oxford, where he matriculated on 23 March 1801, and on 21 June was elected to a Michel exhibition at Queen's College, graduating BA on 30 May 1805, and MA on 23 October 1809; from 1859 to 1863 he was an honorary fellow of his college.

On 31 January 1804, Wightman entered Lincoln's Inn, and, after some years of practice as a special pleader, he was called to the bar in 1821. In 1830 he transferred himself to the Inner Temple and joined the Northern Circuit. He was known as a sound and clear-headed lawyer, and for several years held the post of junior counsel to the treasury.

In 1830, Wightman was appointed a member of the commission of 1830 upon the practice of the common law courts. In 1833, Wightman was appointed to the Royal Commission on the Criminal Law 1833, a royal commission to consolidate existing statutes of criminal law into an English Criminal Code.

He was engaged in many celebrated cases, particularly the prosecutions arising out of the Bristol riots; but, owing to an almost excessive modesty, was little known except to his profession. In February 1841 he was promoted to a judgeship of the Queen's Bench, on the resignation of Mr Justice Joseph Littledale, and was knighted on 28 April, and here he served as a judge for nearly 23 years. While on circuit at York, on 9 December 1863, he was seized with an attack of apoplexy, and died next day.

== Family ==
Wightman married in 1819, Charlotte Mary Baird, daughter of James Baird of Lasswade, near Edinburgh. They had four daughters:

- Caroline Elizabeth, who married the Rev. Peter Almeric Leheup Wood.
- Mary Henrietta, who married Henry Roxby Benson.
- Frances Lucy, who married Matthew Arnold the poet.
- Georgina, unmarried.

== Arms ==
Coat of arms of William Wightman

Notes
Displayed on the wall at Lincoln's Inn Great Hall
Motto
Aequam Servare Mentem
