= J. W. Cecil Turner =

English cricketer, soldier, legal scholar

James William Cecil Turner M.C., LL.D.
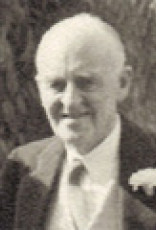
- Born: 2 October 1886; Farnborough, Kent, England
- Died: 29 November 1968 (aged 82); Girton, Cambridge, England
- Education: Queen's College, Cambridge
- Occupations: Legal scholar, Soldier, Cricketer
- Organization: Trinity Hall, Cambridge
- Known for: Criminal law, Roman law
- Notable work: Russell on Crime, Kenny's Outlines of Criminal Law
- Military career
- Allegiance: United Kingdom
- Branch: British Army
- Rank: Second lieutenant
- Unit: Royal Field Artillery
- Conflicts: Great War
- Awards: Military Cross
- Cricket career

Cricket information
- Batting: Right-handed

Domestic team information
- Years: Team
- 1911–1921: Worcestershire

Career statistics
Competition	FC
Matches	48
Runs scored	1,266
Batting average	14.89
100s/50s	1/2
Top score	22
Balls bowled	30
Wickets	2
Bowling average	16.00
5 wickets in innings	0
10 wickets in match	0
Best bowling	1/14
Catches/stumpings	13/–
- Source: , 10 September 2007

Dr James William Cecil Turner (2 October 1886–29 November 1968) was an English first-class cricketer, soldier, and a legal scholar of criminal law and Roman law at the University of Cambridge.

As a cricker, Turner played 46 matches for Worcestershire either side of the First World War, as well as appearing twice for H. K. Foster's XI.

As a scholar, he was a Fellow and Bursar of Trinity Hall, Cambridge from 1926 until 1952.

== Early life ==
Turner was born on 2 October 1886 in Farnborough, Kent. He was educated at King Edward's School, Birmingham, and at Queens’ College, Cambridge, where he gained a First in Part I of the Classical Tripos in 1909 before switching to law and completing Part II of the Law Tripos in 1910.

Before the outbreak of the Great War, he had started to read for the Bar and he played cricket at County level for Worcestershire.

== Cricket career ==
Turner made his debut for Worcestershire against Essex at Amblecote on 31 July 1911, scoring 27 and 11 in a crushing innings-and-228-run defeat. A further five appearances that season brought Turner little success, and nor did a handful more the following season. In 1913 he played a solitary match for H. K. Foster's XI, but he wasn't seen again in first-class cricket until after the First World War.

Turner's return to the game, against Gloucestershire at Worcester in June 1919, saw him make his first half-century: he hit 72 in the second innings of a drawn match. However, he did not again pass 30 that season, although he did pick up the first of his two first-class wickets when he accounted for Warwickshire's Frederick Santall at Worcester at the end of August.

1920 saw Turner both hit another half-century — 85 against Warwickshire in August — and take his other wicket — that of Sussex's George Stannard. The following year, which proved to be his last in the game, Turner scored his only century, hitting 106 against Northamptonshire, though Worcestershire suffered a 356-run defeat, which as of 2007 remains Northants' greatest-ever margin of runs victory.

Turner twice captained the Worcestershire side: against Warwickshire at Birmingham in 1919, and against Glamorgan at St Helens in 1921.

== Military service ==
Turner was called up for military service during the First World War in late 1915 and served in France with the Royal Field Artillery as a Second Lieutenant. He was awarded the Military Cross for gallantry. The citation records that, after withdrawing his battery under heavy fire, he returned under continued enemy fire to rescue his wounded battery sergeant who had been left behind. After serving in Cologne with the occupying forces, he was demobilised in 1920.

== Academic career ==
Turner returned to Cambridge after the war and taught law. He was elected to a fellowship at Trinity Hall in 1926 and appointed to a university lectureship in law in 1928. In 1930 he was appointed bursar of his college and later steward as well.

His special interests were Roman Law and criminal law. He published his Introduction to the Study of Roman Private Law in 1953, but it was in crime that he made his most significant contribution.

In the late 1930s and early 1940s, Turner wrote articles which have been described as “the breakthrough for the modern approach to criminal law”, namely:

- 'Attempts to commit crimes' (1934) 5(2) Cambridge Law Journal 230-247.
- 'The mental element in crimes at Common Law' (1936) 6(1) Cambridge Law Journal 31-66.
- 'Assault at Common Law' (1939) 7(1) Cambridge Law Journal 56-67.
- 'Middleton's Case and the Larceny Act, 1916' (1941) 7(3) Cambridge Law Journal 337–353.

He expanded this modern approach to criminal law in his later works:

- 16th to 19th editions of Kenny's Outlines of Criminal Law (1952-1966).
- 10th to 12th editions of Russell on Crime (1950-1964).
- 1st and 2nd editions of Cases on Criminal Law with Sir Arthur Llewellyn Armitage (1953 and 1968).

A review of Turner's 16th edition of Outlines described it as "an entirely new edition... the book is now his rather than Kenny's".

Turner was joint editor of the Cambridge Studies in Criminal Science with Leon Radzinowicz and secretary of the Faculty of Law during World War II. He played a leading part in founding the Department of Criminal Science and in the Institute of Criminology which grew out of it.

He retired from teaching in 1952 and in 1963 he was awarded a LL.D. by Cambridge University for his contributions to the literature of the criminal law.

A photographic portrait of Turner by Antony Barrington Brown is held at the National Portrait Gallery.

== Personal life and death ==
Turner married Beatrice Maud Stooke in 1924 and they had six children. He kept a wide range of pets, enjoyed gardening and was treasurer of the Cambridge University Cricket Club.

He died in Cambridge on 29 November 1968.
