= William Lax =

English astronomer and mathematician (1761–1836)

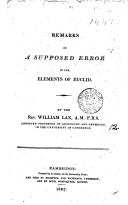
- Cover of Remarks on a Supposed Error in the Elements of Euclid
- Born: 1761; Ravensworth, North Riding of Yorkshire, England
- Died: 29 October 1836 (aged 74–75); St Ippolyts, Hertfordshire, England
- Education: Trinity College, Cambridge
- Known for: Remarks on a Supposed Error in the Elements of Euclid; Tables to be Used with the Nautical Almanac
- Relatives: Andrew Amos (son-in-law)
- Awards: Smith's Prize
- Scientific career
- Fields: Astronomy, mathematics
- Workplaces: University of Cambridge; Board of Longitude; Fellow of the Royal Society

William Lax FRS (1761 – 29 October 1836) was an English astronomer and mathematician who served as Lowndean Professor of Astronomy and Geometry at the University of Cambridge for 41 years.

Lax was born in Ravensworth in the North Riding of Yorkshire. He attended Trinity College, Cambridge and graduated Bachelor of Arts as the Senior Wrangler and first Smith's Prizeman of his year. He was elected a fellow of Trinity College, ordained as a minister, and received his Master of Arts. Lax was granted the livings of vicar of Marsworth, Buckinghamshire and of St Ippolyts near Hitchin, Hertfordshire, where he erected an observatory.

Lax was best known for his Remarks on a Supposed Error in the Elements of Euclid (1807) and his work regarding the Nautical Almanac, which was an important reference for navigation in the period. An obituary claimed that "To whatever Professor Lax applied, he made himself completely master of it". His daughter married Andrew Amos and through that line Lax is the grandfather of Sheldon Amos and the great-grandfather of Maurice Amos, a notable legal dynasty.

== Early life ==
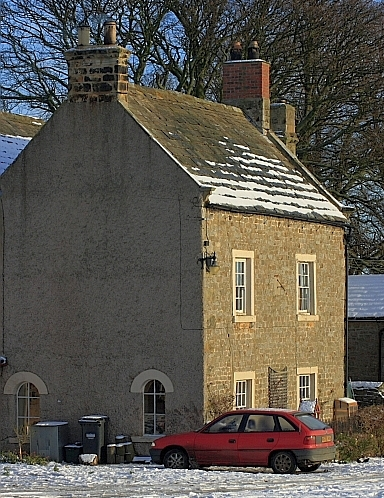
The former grammar school at Kirby Hill

Lax was born in the village of Ravensworth, near Richmond in the North Riding of Yorkshire, England, the son of William (1731 – 19 August 1812) also born in Ravensworth, and Hannah Lax (1738 – 10 June 1811). He was christened on 27 October 1761 in Burneston. He was educated at the Kirby Ravensworth Free Grammar School, where he learned Latin (in which he became fluent) and Greek as well as English language, arithmetic and mathematics. Although the school was subsidised by a charitable trust, "Free" in the context of the school's name meant free from all authority save for the Crown.

Lax was admitted as a sizar to Trinity College, Cambridge University on 22 November 1780 at the age of 19. Trinity was at the time the richest college at Cambridge. Sizars were students who were not of the gentlemanly class, who were charged lower fees and obtained free food and/or lodging and other assistance during their period of study in exchange for performing work at their colleges. By the eighteenth century, sizars were fully integrated members of the community, who were as likely to be employed by Fellow commoners as companions rather than servants. They were expected to wait at table (as were pensioners and scholars), but by the eighteenth century they had their own gyps (servants) and bedmakers.

Lax matriculated in the Michaelmas term of 1781 and became a private tutor to John Pond, later Astronomer Royal. Lax was elected a scholar (i.e. one on a scholarship) of Trinity in 1784; John Cranke and Henry Therond were his tutors, a role which would have seen them not only teaching Lax, but also acting in the role of in loco parentis. Lax was conferred a Bachelor of Arts (B.A.) in 1785 and graduated as the Senior Wrangler and was awarded the first Smith's Prize of his year. Until 1790, all examinations at Trinity were written in Latin.

== Career ==
=== Early career ===
In 1785 Lax was appointed curate of Tideswell in the Peak District of Derbyshire with an annual stipend of £35. In 1786, as was essentially the due of Senior Wranglers, he was elected a fellow of Trinity College. According to Peter Linehan, fellows at this time, "were becoming richer, living and behaving more like gentlemen". He was ordained as a minister in 1787 at Peterborough and received his Master of Arts (M.A.) in 1788. He was a moderator from 1789 to 1791 which entailed him presiding over oral examinations which were then necessary for the B.A. to be awarded. As a moderator Lax was responsible for the introduction of "very high flown compliments, and at the same time extending the disputations to double the usual length, which was around one hour and ten minutes" which "sent a ripple through tradition" according to Greg Dening. Dening argues that this was, "Lax's way of getting into the act and making Acts flourish". In 1791 he was appointed as a taxor by the University. Lax was an assistant tutor from 1797 until 1801, but resigned when he married Margaret Cradock, as College fellows were not permitted to marry.

=== Lowndean Chair ===
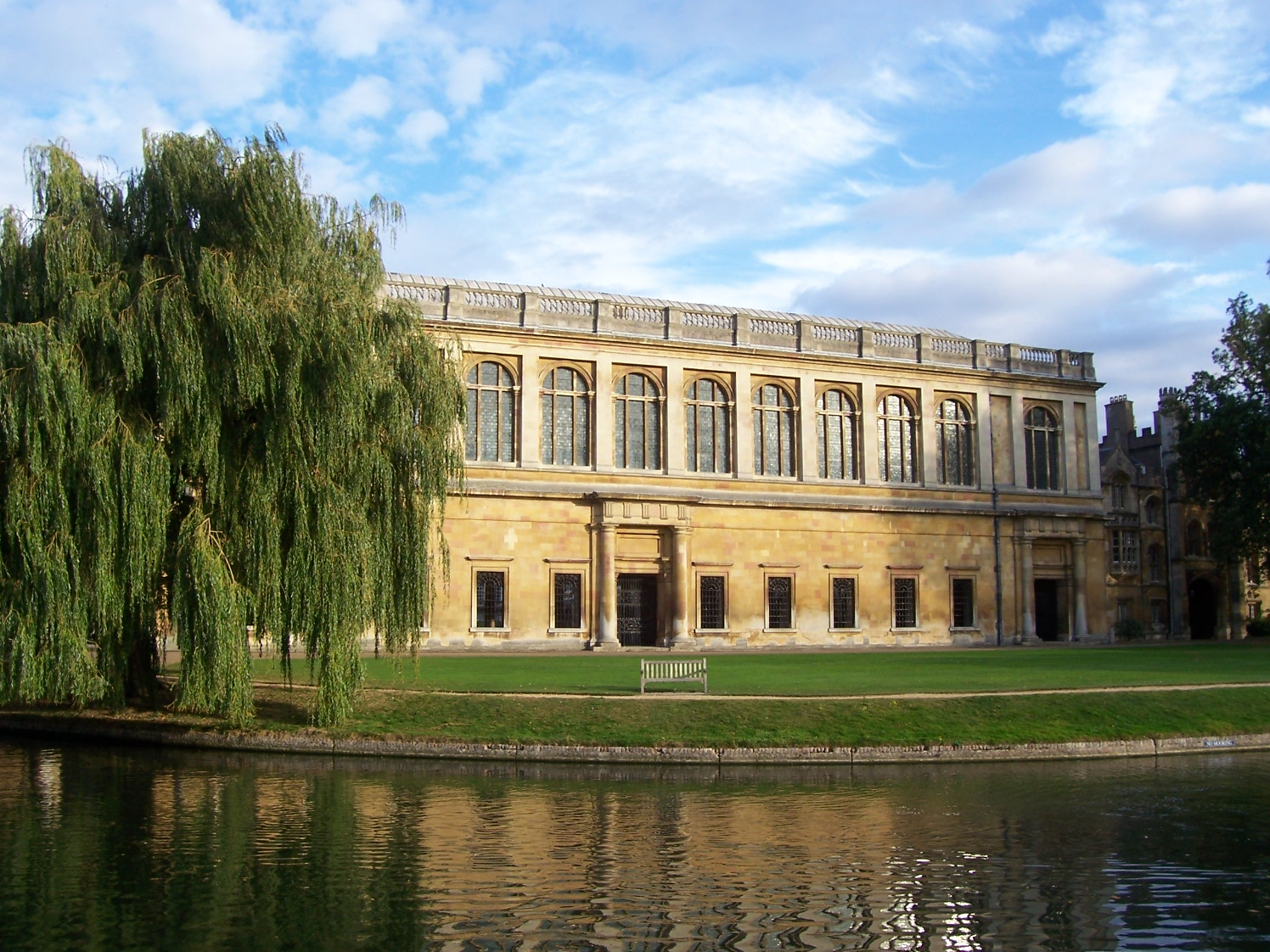
Wren Library, Trinity College, Cambridge.

In 1795 Lax was appointed Lowndean Professor of Astronomy and Geometry in succession to John Smith. The position was a sinecure with an annual salary initially of around £300, later rising to around £500 per annum by 1821. Cambridge had two astronomical chairs, and the Lowndean was seen as the more theoretical and less experimental of the two. During Lax's tenure a mathematical chair was seen as "a prize or a means of securing leisure, and at best, merely as offering a position where a man could pursue his own researches undisturbed by other duties". In 1816 Lax was described as holding the professorship with "great reputation". The sole duty of Lax's professorship was that he was required to examine students annually for the Smith's Prize, including John Herschel, Adam Sedgwick, George Biddell Airy and William Cavendish, 7th Duke of Devonshire.

During Lax's time at Cambridge: "the mathematicians were in the saddle, and it would be difficult to dispute the judgement that they controlled Cambridge studies almost as completely as the logicians had done in the Middle Ages." In early nineteenth century Cambridge "the discipline of mathematics was at the very heart". Newtonian mathematics teaching as exemplified by "Cambridge traditionalists" such as Lax and his generation began to wane as the Georgian era drew to a close. In 1817 George Peacock successfully introduced the new French mathematics (such as Pierre-Simon Laplace and Joseph Louis Lagrange) into the Senate House Examinations. Peacock reported to Herschel, "The introduction of d's into the papers excited much remark. Wood, Vince, Lax & Milner were very angry & threatened to protest against [the infiltration of] French mathematics." For the traditionalists the struggle was more than one of intellectual difference as for them, "Newton's rational mechanics, fluxions, and experimental philosophy were an excellent antidote against materialism and atheism." However, from 1816 to 1824 Lax continued to sit on the Peacock-led board that established Cambridge Observatory.

Lax did encounter some criticism during his tenure. Whilst at the university he "never, as far as is known, delivered a single lecture", despite his chair's bequest that the holder deliver forty lectures each year, although his predecessor had not given any lectures either. The excuse was made that there was already an astronomical chair at Cambridge established before the Lowndean that already gave lectures. By the 1820s it was no longer acceptable to consider chairs as sinecures, and Lax received criticism from a living descendant of the original benefactor, Thomas Lowndes, for being remiss in his duties. His successor to the Lowndean chair George Peacock promised "to do his duty in a less lax manner than his predecessor", and although he struggled to get anyone to attend his lectures on pure mathematics, his lectures on practical astronomy were well attended. However, Peacock's translation as Dean of Ely three years later meant that he was largely absent from his chair, which he was severely criticised for retaining.

=== Fellow of the Royal Society ===
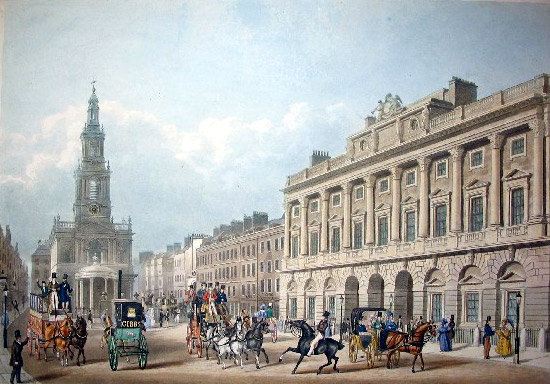
Somerset House in 1836, where the Royal Society met in Lax's time.

Lax was admitted a Fellow of the Royal Society on 5 April 1796. He was nominated by the Astronomer Royal Nevil Maskelyne, Anthony Shepherd, Richard Farmer and William Wales. However, due to an enmity of the President Joseph Banks, friends of Charles Hutton and Maskelyne, such as Lax, Samuel Vince and Thomas Mudge, frequently saw their submissions for publications overlooked. If any of them submitted papers to the Society:

they had the honour of having them carefully lodged in the archives of the Society, where the world in general, or even the members of the Society, would derive no more benefit from them than if they were deposited at the centre of the earth.

Lax delivered two papers to the Royal Society which were published in Philosophical Transactions. In 1799 he delivered A Method of finding the Latitude of a place, by Means of two Altitudes of the Sun and the Time elapsed betwixt the Observations. It was described as "a very valuable paper" by Abraham Rees, and apparently contained "several valuable remarks", but it was criticised as "a subject of no great importance" by the Philosophical Magazine. In his 1809 work On A Method of Examining the Divisions of Astronomical Instruments Lax wrote that no instrument was to be trusted without "previous examination". This argument had an influence on scientists such as Henry Cavendish and was described as an "ingenious...examination" in the Edinburgh Encyclopedia. However the method described by Lax "though very ingenious, requires great labour and time, and is inferior in accuracy and efficiency to that which was adopted by Mr. Troughton for tabulating the errors of the primary divisions of circular instruments." It was also criticised for "greatly resembl[ing]" a method first explicated by the Duke of Chaulnes. In 1807 Lax delivered Remarks on a Supposed Error in the Elements of Euclid to the Royal Society, however it was not published in Philosophical Transactions, but was eventually published independently. In it Lax defended the Greek mathematician against a charge levied at him by Georges-Louis Le Sage in 1756. Lax's defence was applauded by the British Critic as 'perfectly sound'. Lax also espoused the worth of Euclid's Elements in the work, which he considered to reflect "the highest honour upon the human intellect".

=== Board of Longitude ===
Lax was elected to the Board of Longitude after he was nominated to the Lowndean chair in 1795, and remained on the board until it was dissolved in 1828. The Board was a governmental body charged with administering a scheme of prizes intended to encourage innovators to solve the problem of finding longitude at sea, which was vital for accurate navigation. Lax published a set of tables for use with the Nautical Almanac for finding latitude and longitude; these were published by the Board of Longitude in 1821, and whilst they were not considered to be of much practical use for seamen, they were described by The Nautical Magazine as a "very meritorious attempt to solve the problems of nautical astronomy by one uniform system." In 1821, the Board awarded Lax £1050 for his tables, which were intended to replace Nevil Maskelyne's Requisite Tables. However, the extraordinarily accurate chronometers of John Harrison were generally available from the 1820s onwards, rendering the lunar distance method, which Lax had used to create the tables, immaterial. Meanwhile, Edward Sabine criticised errors in Lax's work.

As a scientific member of the Board, Lax was one of eighteen men who were, according to Edmund Dews, "ultimately responsible for the form and contents of the Nautical Almanac. It would have been difficult in these years to select another group equally eminent in their field." Lax was notable for his strong attendance record at the quarterly meetings, not missing a single meeting between 1822 – 25, a record equalled by only three other members, although non-attendance of meetings would have resulted in his not being paid his annual salary of £100. In 1828 Lax appended An easy method of correcting the lunar distance, on account of the spheroidal figure of the earth to the Nautical Almanac. After the Board was dissolved in 1828 Lax unsuccessfully attempted to convince George Biddell Airy to aid in a campaign for its restoration. In 1834 a new edition of his nautical tables was published posthumously. Eva Germaine Rimington Taylor later concluded that all of Lax's works were "of value to the art of navigation".

== Personal life ==
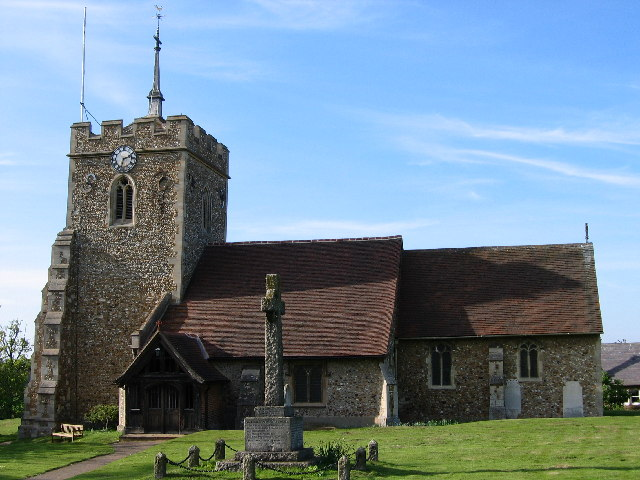
St Ippolyts Church

On 28 February 1801 Lax was granted the livings as vicar of Marsworth, Buckinghamshire and squarson of Great Wymondley with St Ippolyts near Hitchin, Hertfordshire "after some years of teaching work". He lived at St Ippolyts where he erected a private observatory which he had transported from Cambridge and had originally belonged to Isaac Newton. Charles Hutton's 1815 list of England's 20 most notable private observatories (excluding the King's private observatory) included Professor Lax's. Lax spent the last thirty years of his life occupied with "studies and pursuits connected with the advancement of astronomy."

When he arrived at St Ippolyts Lax had trees planted in the vicarage grounds in the form of his initials "W L". That same year he created a park opposite to the vicarage similar to The Backs of Cambridge, built a replica of Trinity College Bridge, dammed the stream and opened springs to form a lake which was used for ice skating in the winter. In September 1801 he married Margaret Cradock (11 June 1776 – 20 January 1854) at the church in Gilling West in the North Riding of Yorkshire. Margaret was the eldest daughter of Sheldon Cradock of Hartforth who was the lord of the manor of Lax's home village of Ravensworth. Lax was a proposer of Robert Woodhouse, Henry Coddington, Herbert Marsh and John Bell for Royal Society fellowship, the latter being one of Lax's closest friends, and he was a keen supporter of George Biddell Airy throughout Airy's career. Lax was a chief supporter of the Whig John Romilly, 1st Baron Romilly's parliamentary bid. In 1824 Lax purchased a coat of arms for himself.

His brother Thomas Lax (1770 – 1 Apr 1851) lived in Ravensworth. He was a gentleman farmer who became a record holding breeder of shorthorn cattle and at one point was credited with the best shorthorn herd in the country. He was "unquestionably a great breeder". He also acted as Chief Constable of the wapentake of Gilling West. The Kirkby Ravensworth parish church has a memorial dedicated to Thomas Lax, as well as a memorial dedicated to the mother of the two brothers.

== Death ==
On 1 December 1834, Lax reported that he had been "of late in a very weak state of health". He died "suddenly" on 29 October 1836 at his home in St Ippolyts. His obituary in The Gentleman's Magazine reported that "his constitution was broken in early life [which] made his last years a period of weakness and suffering, so that his physical strength was unequal to the workings of his active mind. To whatever Professor Lax applied, he made himself completely master of it...[a] most excellent and amiable man." He left behind a widow and two daughters, the eldest Margaret and the younger Marian or Marianne (died 21 June 1873). In 1826 Margaret was married to Andrew Amos at St Ippolyts Church, and via that line Lax is the grandfather of Sheldon Amos and the great-grandfather of Maurice Amos.
