= Downing Professor of the Laws of England =

Professorship in law at the University of Cambridge

Downing Professor of the Laws of England University of Cambridge
- Incumbent; None (since October 2024)
- Faculty of Law, University of Cambridge
- Style: Professor
- Type: Professorship
- Residence: University of Cambridge
- Constituting instrument: Chapter XI, Statutes and Ordinances of the University of Cambridge
- Formation: 1800
- First holder: Edward Christian

The Downing Professorship of the Laws of England is one of the senior professorships in law at the University of Cambridge.

The chair was founded in 1800 in pursuance of the will of Sir George Downing, the founder of Downing College, Cambridge. The professorship was originally attached solely to Downing College (although the Professor undertook University activities). In the early 20th Century, for financial reasons, this professorship, together with the Downing Professor of Medicine, was severed from the College.

The original electors of the chair were the Archbishop of Canterbury, the Archbishop of York, and the masters of the colleges of Clare, St John's and Downing.

In 1788 Edward Christian, brother of Fletcher Christian, was appointed to the post prior to its official creation 12 years later. The chair is currently vacant following the departure of Lionel Smith in 2024.

== Downing professors ==
1. Edward Christian (1788/1800)
2. Thomas Starkie (1823)
3. Andrew Amos (1849)
4. William Lloyd Birkbeck (1860)
5. Frederic William Maitland (1888)
6. Courtney Stanhope Kenny (1907)
7. Harold Dexter Hazeltine (1919)
8. Emlyn Capel Stewart Wade (1945)
9. Sir William Ivor Jennings (1962)
10. Richard Meredith Jackson (1966)
11. Stanley Alexander de Smith (1970)
12. Gareth Hywel Jones (1975)
13. Sir John Hamilton Baker (1998)
14. Dame Sarah Elizabeth Worthington (2011)
15. Lionel Smith (2022)
