= E. C. S. Wade =

British constitutional law scholar

Emlyn Capel Stewart Wade QC FBA (31 August 1895 – 28 April 1978) was a British constitutional law scholar. He was Downing Professor of the Laws of England at the University of Cambridge from 1945 to 1962.

== Biography ==
The son of Charles Stewart Douglas Wade, Wade was educated at St Lawrence College, Ramsgate and Gonville and Caius College, Cambridge, where he took Firsts in both parts of the Law Tripos. During the First World War he served with the Royal Garrison Artillery with the British Salonika Force. In 1920 he was elected a scholar of Gonville and Caius College, and won the Whewell Scholarship in International Law in 1922. He was then called to the bar at the Inner Temple.

Wade practised at the bar in London and Newscastle, and lectured in Law Armstrong College, Durham (now Newcastle University), becoming its Vice-Principal in 1924 and Principal in 1926. In 1928 he returned to Cambridge as a fellow of St John's College, Cambridge, and university lecturer. In 1931 he returned to Gonville and Caius College as a fellow. During World War II Wade first served in a London anti-aircraft brigade, before being transferred to the War Cabinet Secretariat and subsequently the Home Office.

In 1945 Wade was elected Downing Professor of the Laws of England, holding the post until his retirement in 1962. In 1962–63 he was Hinkley Visiting Professor at Johns Hopkins University.

From November 1948 to January 1949 he was a member of the British delegation of the Committee for the Study of European Unity, convened by the Brussels Treaty Organisation to draw up the blueprint of the future Council of Europe.

== Works ==
Wade's most famous work is Constitutional Law, published with G. Godfrey Phillips and commonly known as 'Wade and Phillips'. It was first published in 1931 and which went through ten editions during his lifetime. He also edited and wrote an introduction to A. V. Dicey's The Law of the Constitution, publishing new editions in 1939 and 1959.
