= Kenny's Outlines of Criminal Law =

Textbook of English criminal law

Kenny's Outlines of Criminal Law (originally published as Outlines of Criminal Law) was a leading criminal law textbook published in 19 editions from 1902 to 1966 by Cambridge University Press. It was originally written by the jurist and academic Courtney Stanhope Kenny, and it was updated for the 14th and 15th editions by G. Godfrey Phillips, and then re-written for its 16th to 19th editions by J. W. Cecil Turner.

The work offered a systematic and principled treatment of English criminal law, intended for students and practitioners, and it became one of the standard texts in the field during the first half of the twentieth century.

== History ==
=== Development ===
The first thirteen editions (1902–1929) of Outlines were written entirely by Kenny himself. The full title of the first edition was Outlines of criminal law, based on lectures delivered in the University of Cambridge, and in his preface to that edition Kenny explained that the work was a compilation of the lectures he had given over the previous 25 years.

After Kenny's death in 1930, G. Godfrey Phillips revised the 14th and 15th editions as Kenny's Outlines, updating statutory and case references while keeping the original structure.

From 1952 to 1966, J. W. Cecil Turner produced the 16th to 19th editions. His 16th edition was described by the Cambridge Law Journal as "an entirely new edition... the book is now his rather than Kenny's". Turner reorganized the material on mens rea, homicide, and property offences, and integrated mid-twentieth-century statutory developments. Subsequent editions maintained his structure with minor updates.

=== Decline ===
The work lost its dominant status in English legal education between the late 1960s and the 1980s. Turner died in 1968 and no successor editor was appointed by Cambridge University Press, leaving the text static.

By the 1970s, there had been extensive statutory reform of the criminal law, which rendered much of the 19th edition obsolete. New textbooks filled the vacuum, including Smith and Hogan's Criminal Law and Glanville Williams’s Textbook of Criminal Law, which provided up-to-date analysis, integration of statutory developments, and discussion of legal policy.

By the early 1980s, Kenny’s Outlines was a historical and bibliographic source rather than a contemporary doctrinal authority.

== Editions ==
=== Main ===
- Kenny, Courtney Stanhope (1902–1929). Outlines of Criminal Law (1st–13th ed.).
- Phillips, G. Godfrey (1933–1936). Kenny's Outlines of Criminal Law (14th-15th ed.). Cambridge University Press.
- Turner, J. W. Cecil (1952–1966). Kenny's Outlines of Criminal Law (16th-19th ed.). Cambridge University Press.

=== Online reprint ===
- Turner, J. W. Cecil (2013). Kenny's Outlines of Criminal Law (18th ed.). Cambridge University Press. doi:10.1017/CBO9781316530290. ISBN 978-1-316-53029-0. (1962, 2016 reprint).

=== US editions ===
- Webb, James H. (1907). Kenny's Outlines of Criminal Law: Revised and Adapted for American Scholars.
- Kenny, Courtney Stanhope (1913–1922). Outlines of Criminal Law (U.S. edition) (1st–2nd (American eds.) ed.). The Macmillan Company, New York.

== Influence ==
Outlines of Criminal Law established itself as the leading academic text in English criminal law teaching for decades. It helped to shift the subject from a practitioner’s manual to an academic discipline concerned with general principles and moral foundations. Turner’s later editions reflected the movement toward a more analytical and positivist style of legal scholarship. The work’s influence continued in Commonwealth jurisdictions until the rise of newer comprehensive criminal law texts in the 1970s.

== See also ==
- Bibliography of English criminal law
- Harris's Criminal Law
- Smith, Hogan and Ormerod's Criminal Law
