= Edward Christian =

English judge and law professor

Edward Christian (3 March 1758 – 29 March 1823) was an English judge and law professor. He was the older brother of Fletcher Christian, leader of the mutiny on the Bounty.

== Life ==
Edward Christian was one of the three sons of Charles Christian of Moorland Close and of the large Ewanrigg Hall estate in Dearham, Cumberland, an attorney-at-law descended from Manx gentry, and his wife Ann Dixon.

Charles's marriage to Ann brought with it the small property of Moorland Close, "a quadrangle pile of buildings ... half castle, half farmstead." Charles died in 1768 and Edward's mother, Ann, proved herself irresponsible with money. By 1779, Ann had run up a debt of nearly £6,500 (equal to £977,683 today), and faced the prospect of debtors' prison. Moorland Close was lost and Ann and her younger children were forced to flee to the Isle of Man, where English creditors had no power. The three elder Christian sons managed to arrange a £40 (equal to £6,017 today) per year annuity for their mother, allowing the family to live in genteel poverty. His mother, Ann, died on the Isle of Man in 1819.

Christian attended St Bees School and went up to Peterhouse, Cambridge in 1775, but migrated to St John's College in 1777, graduating as third wrangler in 1779. From 1781 to 1782, Edward Christian was Headmaster at Hawkshead Grammar School. He left his job at the school to go to Cambridge University.

While at Cambridge, he forged a friendship with William Wilberforce. He was admitted to Gray's Inn on 5 July 1782. In 1788, Christian was appointed Downing Professor of the Laws of England at the University of Cambridge, although the chair was only founded along with Downing College in 1800. He held the professorship in conjunction with a fellowship of Downing until his death in 1823. He was also law professor at the East India Company College from 1806 to 1818.

Christian was Chief Justice of the Isle of Ely and was one of the presiding judges at the Ely and Littleport riot Special Commission assizes at Ely in 1816.

== Works ==
In 1794, Stephen Barney, counsel to the mutineer William Muspratt, at the urging of Edward Christian, published his version of the Minutes of the Bounty Court-Martial, and included an Appendix written by Edward Christian. In it, Edward did not try to excuse his brother Fletcher's conduct, but citing his interviews with several of the people involved (none directly), and listing the names and addresses of several prominent people as witnesses to these interviews, he recounted several of the excesses of William Bligh, Commander of the Bounty. At the time of the publication of the Minutes and Appendix, the public's only published source of information about the mutiny were Bligh's own A Narrative of the Mutiny on the Bounty, published in 1790, and A Voyage to the South Sea, published in 1792. With the publication of the Appendix, the tide of public opinion began to turn against Bligh. Indeed, Bligh responded by publishing An Answer to Certain Assertions Contained in The Appendix to a Pamphlet, entitled... etc., etc., to which, Edward Christian promptly published A Short Reply to Capt. William Bligh's Answer, which only served to fan the flames.

The process was aided by the efforts of the family of Peter Heywood, a midshipman on the Bounty, and others, but many attribute the source of William Bligh's bad reputation, to this day, to Edward Christian's Appendix. It is believed by many that Edward Christian's impetus for both the Minutes and the Appendix, were a letter from, and a subsequent meeting with, Peter Heywood, after the latter's pardon.

Christian is also known for producing the twelfth edition of the Commentaries on the Laws of England, including Christian’s notes and additions to what William Blackstone had written. The twelfth edition was published in several volumes from 1793 to 1795.
