= The Province of Jurisprudence Determined =

The Province of Jurisprudence Determined is a book written by John Austin, first published in 1832, in which he sets out his theory of law generally known as the 'command theory'. Austin believed that the science of general jurisprudence consisted in the clarification and arrangement of fundamental legal notions.

His object in this book is to identify the distinguishing characteristics of positive law to free it from the precepts of religion and morality. The book consists of six lectures designed to be delivered in a law school setting. Although his theory did not receive significant attention in the 19th century, it has since become central to the jurisprudential canon, and has been criticised, adapted and enlarged upon by subsequent jurists such as H. L. A. Hart and Ronald Dworkin.

Austin was a student of Jeremy Bentham, and as such subscribed to Utilitarianism. He adopted this perspective in his understanding of law, and argued that all laws should work toward promoting the greatest good for the greatest number of people.

According to Austin, a law is 'a rule laid down for the guidance of an intelligent being by an intelligent being having power over him.' This was what Austin defined as positive law. Austin believed that positive law was the appropriate focus of study for jurisprudence. He states that:

'Every positive law, or every law simply and strictly so called, is set, directly or circuitously, by a sovereign person or body, to a member or members of the independent political society wherein that person or body is supreme.'

According to Austin, the sovereign could not be legally limited, 'supreme power limited by positive law is a flat contradiction in terms' he states. However, he did concede that a sovereign may be limited in a non-legal sense by 'popular opinion'.

He defined divine law as 'law set by God to his human creatures'. Although he contends that God's (law) is above and beyond human law, he also states that:

'To say that human laws which conflict with the Divine law are not binding, that is to say, are not law, is to talk stark nonsense.' He emphasises that a law set by a sovereign to a subject is not negated by any apparent conflicting divine or moral law.'
