= Harold Dexter Hazeltine =

American legal scholar

Harold Dexter Hazeltine, FBA (1871–1960) was an American legal scholar.

== Early life and education ==
Born on 18 November 1871 at Warren, Pennsylvania, he was the son of a banker and attended Brown University (graduating with an AB degree in 1894) and Harvard Law School (where he earned the LLB in 1898). At Harvard, he grew increasingly interested in legal history. He then studied at the University of Berlin and completed a doctoral dissertation; he was awarded the degree of juris utriusque doctor (JUD) in 1905.

== Career ==
In 1906, he was appointed lecturer in law at Emmanuel College, Cambridge, in 1906 and was acquainted with F. W. Maitland, after whose death that year the post of Reader in Law at the University of Cambridge became vacant. In 1908, Hazeltine was appointed to the readership and was also elected a fellow of Emmanuel College. In 1919, he was appointed Downing Professor of the Laws of England and moved as a fellow to Downing College; he remained in the post until 1942, although he returned to the United States in 1940 after the Second World War broke out.

Hazeltine's doctoral thesis formed the basis of his first book, Die Geschichte des englischen Pfandrechts, a history of mortgages in English law, published in 1907. He authored Law of the Air in 1911, an early work on aviation law. He instigated the Cambridge Studies in English Legal History series in 1921, which he edited for twelve volumes. He also contributed towards The Cambridge Medieval History in 1926. Hazeltine was elected a Fellow of the British Academy in 1924. He was known for his ability to synthesise existing legal scholarship but made few original contributions or investigations. He published little aside from book reviews from the mid-1920s.

After leaving Cambridge, he lived out the remainder of his life in the United States, with an office at Harvard Law School. He died on 23 January 1960.

== Likenesses ==
- Harold Dexter Hazeltine, by Walter Stoneman (bromide print, 1932): Photographs Collection, National Portrait Gallery, London (ref. NPG x168229).
