= Royal Commission on Revising and Consolidating the Criminal Law (1845–1849) =

Royal Commission for criminal law reform (1845–1849)

Royal Commission overview
- Formed: 22 February 1845
- Preceding Royal Commission: Royal Commission on the Criminal Law
- Dissolved: 3 July 1849
- Superseding Royal Commission: Board for the Revision of the Statute Law
- Jurisdiction: England and Wales
- Royal Commission executives: Sir Edward Ryan, Commissioner; Thomas Starkie (died 1849), Commissioner; Charles Henry Bellenden Ker, Commissioner; Andrew Amos, Commissioner; Vaughan Richards, Commissioner; James John Lonsdale, Secretary
- Key documents: First Report (30 May 1845); Second Report (14 May 1846); Third Report (10 June 1847); Fourth Report (30 March 1848); Fifth Report (13 July 1849)

The Royal Commission on Revising and Consolidating the Criminal Law (also known as the Criminal Law Commission of 1845 or the Statute Law Commission of 1845) was a Royal Commission that ran from 1845 to 1849 to consolidate existing statutes and enactments of English criminal law.

The Commission replaced the 1833 Royal Commission on the Criminal Law, and five reports. The commission's proposals and draft bills were not pursued.

There was a later Royal Commission on the Law Relating to Indictable Offences (1871–1879) which also recommended consolidation.

== Background ==
In the United Kingdom, Acts of Parliament remain in force until expressly repealed. Blackstone's Commentaries on the Laws of England, published in the late 18th century, raised questions about the system and structure of the common law and the poor drafting and disorder of the existing statute book. By the start of the 19th century, it was widely recognised that the criminal law stood in need of the greatest reform.

The Royal Commission on the Criminal Law 1833 issued its final report in 1845, proposing a draft bill digesting criminal law and procedure. However, the ambition for such a comprehensive legal was dissipating. The Tories were in government and the new Whig ministry led by John Russell in 1846 would not include the Lord Chancellor, Henry Brougham, 1st Baron Brougham and Vaux.

Lord Brougham introduced a bill embodying the digest, but it was withdrawn on an undertaking by Brougham's opponent, Lord Lyndhurst, that a second Commission would be appointed to revise it.

== Terms of reference ==
The commission was appointed by letters patent dated 22 February 1845 by the Lord Chancellor, John Copley, 1st Baron Lyndhurst. The commission's terms of reference were:

- To complete the unfinished report of the previous Commissioners
- To consider the previous reports and the alterations therein suggested, and the expediency of consolidating into one or more statute or statutes the whole or any part or parts of the criminal law, written or unwritten
- To prepare a Bill or Bills for the purpose

The Commissioners were paid, and included several members from the 1833 Commission:

- Sir Edward Ryan
- Thomas Starkie
- Charles Henry Bellenden Ker
- Andrew Amos
- Vaughan Richards

The barrister James John Lonsdale was appointed Secretary to the commission.

Starkie died in 1849, before the publication of the commission's fifth report. On 27 April 1849, permission was granted by the Home Secretary, Sir George Grey, 2nd Baronet, for the commission to complete their work.

== Proceedings ==
The Commission issued five reports, dated 30 May 1845, 14 May 1846, 10 June 1847, 30 March 1848 and 13 July 1849.

The commission also completed the unfinished eighth and final report of their predecessor, the Royal Commission on the Criminal Law, on 5 July 1845.

=== First report ===
The Commission issued its first report on 30 May 1845, covering penalties and disabilities in regard to religious opinion:

1. Maintaining the Pope's spiritual jurisdiction and authority within this realm
2. Uniformity of public worship
3. Professing, exercising or promoting a religion other than that established
4. Recusancy, or the not resorting to a person's parish church
5. Holding offices or places of public trust, or following certain public occupations, without complying with certain tests; and refusing to comply with certain tests when tendered by Justices of the Peace, or other persons appointed for the purpose by the Queen in Council, or under the Great seal
6. A summary of the recommendations of the Commissioners with regard to the foregoing subjects

=== Second report ===
The Commission issued its second report on 14 May 1846, covering homicide and offences against the person and providing a draft bill for an "Act for Consolidating and Amending so much of the Criminal Law as relates to Incapacity to commit Crimes, Duress, the essentials of a Criminal Inquiry, Criminal Agency and Participation, and Homicide and other Offences against the Person".

=== Third report ===
The Commission issued its second report on 10 June 1847, covering:

1. Fraudulent appropriations, including
  1. Theft
  2. Robbery
  3. False pretences
  4. Embezzlement
  5. Cheats, and other like fraudulent practices
  6. Receiving or otherwise unlawfully dealing with property stolen, embezzled or wrongfully obtained
2. Piracy and offences connected with the slave trade
3. Forgery and other offences connected therewith
4. Offences against the habitation, including
  1. Burglary
  2. Arson
5. Malicious injuries to property
6. Offences relating to the coin, and to bullion and gold and silver plate
7. Offences against the law of marriage
8. Offences relating to public records and registers
9. Offences against public morals and decency
10. Offences relating to trade, commerce and public communication

=== Fourth report ===
The Commission issued its fourth report on 30 March 1848, covering:

1. Treason, and other offences against the state
2. Offences against religion and the established church
3. Offences against the executive power generally
4. Offences against the administration of justice
5. Offences against the public peace
6. Libel
7. Offences against public health
8. Common nuisances
9. Illegal solicitations, conspiracies, attempts and repetition of offences
10. Penalties

The Commissioners highlighted three primary point of disagreement:

1. Criminal incapacity. The majority view was that the proper test for criminal incapacity is whether the accused had the capacity to discern if their actions were contrary to the law of the land. The dissenting view was that a party should not be regarded as responsible for their actions if they cannot discern whether what they are doing is wrong, not just illegal.
2. Responsibility of married women. The majority view was that married women should be exempt from criminal responsibility for actions performed in the presence of their husbands, based on the presumption of marital coercion. The dissenting view was that the exemption should not be so limited — the law should consider whether the wife acted freely or under coercion, based on the facts of each case.
3. Homicide responsibility. The majority view was that if a death is caused by medical treatment meant to cure an injury caused by the accused, the accused should still be deemed guilty of homicide.
4. Execution of process. The majority supported provisions are designed to protect officers of justice when they act under the belief that they are acting legally, even if in reality, they are acting illegally.
5. Previous consent to homicide. The majority view was that if the person killed had previously consented to the homicide, this would be considered a ground of extenuation. One Commissioner disagreed.
6. Suicide. The majority proposed to extenuate the promoting, procuring, or aiding in the crime of suicide. One Commissioner disagreed on moral grounds.
7. Duelling. The majority view was that the killing of a party in a duel should no longer be capital punishment, provided no unfair advantage was take. The dissenting view was that duelling should still carry the severe consequence of capital punishment.
8. Excess of Violence. The majority supported the provision dealing with the legal effect of an excess of violence beyond what is allowed by law. One Commissioner found this provision to be too lenient.

=== Fifth report ===
The Commission issued its fifth and final report on 13 July 1849, covering indictable offences and providing a draft bill for "An Act for Consolidating and Amending the Law of Procedure in respect of Indicatable Offences".

== Criticism ==
The Commission incurred expenses of £12,557 3s. 3d., which was subject to criticism legal academics and commentators, and by politicians, including Peter King MP and George Hadfield MP as part of an 1869 resolution criticising the expensive process of legal revision that had taken place over 36 years, costing the country over £80,000 without yielding substantial results.

== Legacy ==
On 6 June 1846, Lord Brougham introduced a draft Bill of an "Entire Digest of the written and unwritten Law relating to the Definition of Crimes and Punishment" but was not proceeded with.

In autumn of 1852, the Lord Chancellor, Edward Sugden, 1st Baron St Leonards, directed James John Lonsdale and Charles Greaves to prepare Bills for the codification of criminal law based on the reports of the Criminal Law Commissioners. Two major Bills based on the work of the Commission covering offences against the person and larceny were introduced in 1853 and continued under Lord Cranworth. The bills made no progress, principally because of the unanimously unfavourable judicial reaction to the prospect of the common law being embodied in statutory form.

Little remained of the Commissioner's work in Charles Greaves' Criminal Law Consolidation Acts 1861. However, the commission's reports were complemented and acknowledged by Greaves:

"[The reports contain a] vast mass of most valuable information, together with many observations on the different parts of the criminal law, which are well deserving consideration by any one who may turn his attention to the importance of that branch of the law."

At the start of the parliamentary session in 1853, Lord Cranworth announced his intention to the improvement of the statute law and in March 1853, appointed the Board for the Revision of the Statute Law to repeal expired statutes and continue consolidation, with a wider remit that included civil law. The Board issued three reports, recommending the creation of a permanent body for statute law reform. On 29 August 1854, the temporary Board was superseded by the Royal Commission for Consolidating the Statute Law. Recommendations made by the commission were implemented by the Repeal of Obsolete Statutes Act 1856 (19 & 20 Vict. c. 64), the Statute Law Revision Act 1861 (24 & 25 Vict. c. 101) and subsequent Statute Law Revision Acts.
