= John Austin (legal philosopher) =

English legal philosopher (1790–1859)

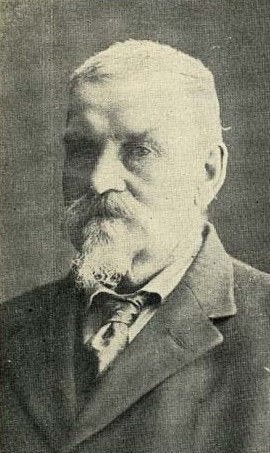
- Born: 3 March 1790; Creeting St Mary, Suffolk, England
- Died: 1 December 1859 (aged 69); Weybridge, Surrey, England

Philosophical work
- Era: 19th-century philosophy
- Region: Western philosophy
- School: Legal positivism
- Institutions: University College London
- Main interests: Legal philosophy
- Notable ideas: Criticism of natural law

John Austin (3 March 1790 – 1 December 1859) was an English legal theorist who posthumously influenced British and American law with an analytical approach to jurisprudence and a theory of legal positivism. Austin opposed traditional approaches of "natural law", arguing against any need for connections between law and morality. Human legal systems, he claimed, can and should be studied in an empirical, value-free way.

== Life and work ==
Austin was born on 3 March 1790 at Creeting St Mary in today's district of Mid Suffolk, as the eldest son of a well-to-do miller.

After spending five years in the army during the Napoleonic Wars, Austin turned to law, and spent seven unhappy years practicing at the Chancery bar. In 1819, he married Sarah Taylor and became neighbours and close friends with Jeremy Bentham, James Mill, and John Stuart Mill. Mainly through Bentham's influence, Austin was appointed Professor of Jurisprudence at the newly-founded University College London in July 1827. However, Austin's lectures were not well-attended and he resigned his university post in 1834.

Thereafter, aside from two stints on government commissions, Austin lived largely on his wife Sarah Austin's earnings as a writer and translator. Plagued by ill health, depression and self-doubt, Austin wrote little after the publication of his major work, The Province of Jurisprudence Determined (1832). This work was largely ignored in Austin's lifetime, but became influential after his death, when his widow published a second edition in 1861. A second book, Lectures on Jurisprudence, was put together by her from Austin's notes and published in 1863.

In 1833, Austin was appointed to the Royal Commission on the Criminal Law 1833, a royal commission to consolidate existing statutes of criminal law into an English Criminal Code. There were conflicting interests between Charles Henry Bellenden Ker and Austin on the Commission. Austin's interest in codification was heavily influenced by his mentor, Bentham, whereas Ker's interest came from concerns about the quality of statutes and the difficulty drafting legislation Finding the work uncongenial and having little support for his opinions, in 1836, Austin resigned after signing two reports and was replaced by barrister David Jardine.

John Austin died on 1 December 1859 in Weybridge. His only child, Lucie, later became Lady Duff-Gordon.

== Legal positivism ==
Austin's goal was to transform law into a true science. To do this, he believed it was necessary to purge human law of all moralistic notions and to define key legal concepts in strictly empirical terms. Law, according to Austin, is a social fact and reflects relations of power and obedience. This twofold view, that (1) law and morality are separate and (2) that all human-made ("positive") laws can be traced back to human lawmakers, is known as legal positivism. Drawing heavily on the thought of Jeremy Bentham, Austin was the first legal thinker to work out a fully developed positivistic theory of law.

Austin argues that laws are rules, which he defines as a type of command. More precisely, laws are general commands issued by a sovereign to members of an independent political society, and backed up by credible threats of punishment or other adverse consequences ("sanctions") in the event of non-compliance. The sovereign in any legal system is the person or group of persons habitually obeyed by the bulk of the population, which does not habitually obey anyone else. A command is a declared wish that something should be done, issued by a superior, and accompanied by threats in the event of non-compliance. Such commands give rise to legal duties to obey. Note that all the key concepts in this account (law, sovereign, command, sanction, duty) are defined in terms of empirically verifiable social facts. No moral judgment, according to Austin, is ever necessary to determine what the law is—though morality must be consulted in determining what the law should be. Austin, as a utilitarian, believed that laws should promote the greatest happiness of society.

== Criticism ==
Though Austin's brand of legal positivism was greatly influential in the late 19th and early 20th centuries, it is widely seen as overly simplistic today. Critics such as H. L. A. Hart have charged that Austin's account fails to recognize that:

- Law-making powers are dispersed in many modern societies and it is difficult to identify a "sovereign" in Austin's sense.
- Most legal systems include rules that do not impose sanctions, but empower officials or citizens to do certain things (such as drawing up wills), or specify ways that legal rules may be identified or changed.
- Those threats do not give rise to obligations. If they did, there would be no essential difference between a gunman's threat ("Your money or your life") and an ordinary piece of legislation.
