= Robert Ernest Ross =

English barrister (1871–1960)

- Born: 1871
- Died: 1960 (aged 88–89)
- Education: University of London
- Occupations: Barrister, court official, legal writer
- Known for: Criminal law
- Notable work: Archbold Criminal Pleading, Evidence and Practice; Russell on Crime

Robert Ernest Ross (1871–1960) was an English barrister, court official, and legal writer, notable for his long service as Principal Clerk of the Court of Criminal Appeal and for his editorial work on leading English criminal-law practitioner texts, including Archbold Criminal Pleading, Evidence and Practice and Russell on Crime.

== Early life and education ==
Ross obtained the degree of LLB from the University of London in 1898. He was later called to the Bar by the Middle Temple.

== Career ==
Early in his career, Ross worked as one of the sub-editors of the first edition of Halsbury’s Laws of England, contributing to editorial coordination, verification of authorities, and the standardisation of legal exposition under the general editorship of Lord Halsbury.

He subsequently became Principal Clerk of the Court of Criminal Appeal from its establishment in 1907 until he retired in 1936. It was reputed that Ross had been on duty at every murder appeal which had been heard by the time he retired.

Ross authored The Court of Criminal Appeal (1911), a contemporary account of the court’s jurisdiction, procedure, and practice, reflecting his professional involvement in its administration.

Ross was also a leading editor of criminal-law practitioner texts. From 1918 to 1938 (the 25th to 30th editions), he served as co-editor and later senior editor of Archbold Criminal Pleading, Evidence and Practice.

He also edited the 8th and 9th editions (1923, 1936) of Russell on Crime.
