= Burt Totaro =

American mathematician

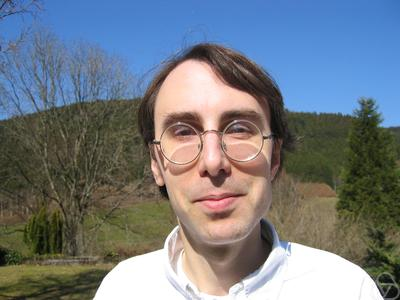
- Born: Burt James Totaro; 1967 (age 58–59)
- Education: Princeton University; University of California, Berkeley
- Awards: Whitehead Prize (2000); Prix Franco-Britannique (2001)
- Scientific career
- Workplaces: University of California, Los Angeles; University of Cambridge; University of Chicago
- Thesis: K-Theory and Algebraic Cycles (1989)
- Doctoral advisor: Shoshichi Kobayashi
- Website: burttotaro.wordpress.com; www.math.ucla.edu/~totaro/

Burt James Totaro, FRS (b. 1967), is an American mathematician, currently a professor at the University of California, Los Angeles, specializing in algebraic geometry and algebraic topology.

== Education and early life ==
Totaro participated in the Study of Mathematically Precocious Youth while in grade school and enrolled at Princeton University in 1980 at the age of thirteen, becoming the youngest freshman in its history. He scored a perfect 800 on the math portion and a 690 on the verbal portion of the SAT-I exam at the age of 12. He graduated in 1984 and went on to graduate school at the University of California, Berkeley, receiving his Ph.D. in 1989.

== Career and research ==
Since 2009, he has been one of three managing editors of the journal Compositio Mathematica; he is also on the editorial boards of Forum of Mathematics, Pi and Sigma, the Journal of the American Mathematical Society, and the Bulletin of the American Mathematical Society. In 2012, he became a professor in the UCLA Department of Mathematics.

Totaro's work is influenced by the Hodge conjecture, and is based on the connections and application of topology to algebraic geometry. His work has applications in a number of diverse areas of mathematics, from representation theory to Lie theory and group cohomology.

=== Selected works ===
- Totaro, Burt (1996). "Configuration spaces of algebraic varieties". Topology. 35 (4): 1057–1067. doi:10.1016/0040-9383(95)00058-5. MR 1404924.
- Totaro, Burt (2014). Group Cohomology and Algebraic Cycles. Cambridge: Cambridge University Press. ISBN 978-1-107-01577-7.

== Recognition ==
In 2000, he was elected Lowndean Professor of Astronomy and Geometry at the University of Cambridge. In the same year, he was awarded the Whitehead Prize by the London Mathematical Society.

In 2009, Totaro was elected Fellow of the Royal Society. He was included in the 2019 class of fellows of the American Mathematical Society "for contributions to algebraic geometry, Lie theory and cohomology and their connections and for service to the profession".
