= Samuel March Phillipps =

Samuel March Phillipps (1780–1862) was an English civil servant and legal writer.

== Life ==
The second son of Thomas March of More Crichel in Dorset, he was born at Uttoxeter on 14 July 1780. His father assumed the additional surname of Phillipps on succeeding in 1796 to the estate of Garendon Park in Leicestershire, under the will of his cousin Samuel Phillipps. His mother was Susan, fourteenth daughter of Charles Lisle of Crux-Easton, Hampshire; Charles March-Phillipps was his elder brother. He was educated at Sherborne, Charterhouse School and Sidney Sussex College, Cambridge, where he graduated B.A. in 1802, and proceeded M.A. in 1805. He was called to the bar at the Inner Temple in 1806, but did not practise.

In 1827 Phillipps accepted the post of permanent under-secretary for home affairs, which he held until 1848, when he retired, and was sworn of the privy council. He died at Great Malvern on 11 March 1862.

== Works ==
Phillipps wrote Treatise on the Law of Evidence, London, 1814, which became a standard textbook. The eighth and last English edition, in the preparation of which he was assisted by Andrew Amos, appeared at London in 1838, 2 vols. The fifth American edition was published at New York in 1868, 3 vols. In 1826 he edited State Trials; or a Collection of the most interesting Trials prior to the Revolution of 1688, London, 2 vols.

== Family ==
Phillipps married, on 16 October 1812, Charemelle (d. 1825), second daughter of Charles Grant, and sister of Charles Grant, 1st Baron Glenelg, by whom he had two sons.

== Notes ==
Attribution

This article incorporates text from a publication now in the public domain: Lee, Sidney, ed. (1896). "Phillipps, Samuel March". Dictionary of National Biography. Vol. 45. London: Smith, Elder & Co.
