= Thomas Lowndes (astronomer) =

Thomas Lowndes (1692 – 12 May 1748) was the founder of the Lowndean professorship of astronomy at Cambridge University, England.

Both his father and mother were Cheshire landowners. In 1725 he was appointed provost marshal of South Carolina, a post he preferred to hold by deputy. In 1727 Lowndes claimed to have taken a prominent part in inducing the British government to purchase Carolina, but he surrendered his patent when the transfer of the colony to the crown was completed. His patent was renewed in 1730, but he resigned it in 1733.

He then brought various impractical schemes before the government to check the illicit trade in wool between Ireland and France; to regulate the paper currency of New England; and to supply the navy with salt from brine, etc. By his will he left his inherited Cheshire properties to the University of Cambridge for the foundation of a chair of astronomy and geometry.
