= George Stannard (cricketer) =

English cricketer

George Arthur Stannard (9 July 1892 – 28 June 1971) was an English cricketer active from 1914 to 1925 who played for Sussex. He was born in Steyning, Sussex and died in Brighton. He appeared in 73 first-class matches as a righthanded batsman who bowled right-arm slow medium pace. He scored 1,447 runs with a highest score of 114 and took fourteen wickets with a best performance of four for 70.
