= Criminal Law Reform Now Network =

Research network of academics in the UK

The Criminal Law Reform Now Network (the CLRN Network or CLRNN) is an independent research network of academics and other legal experts which aims to gather and distribute comprehensible proposals for reform of the criminal law of England and Wales to the wider community.

The CLRN Network was launched following a general reform conference in 2016 at the Crime Research Centre of the University of Sussex and the proposals made at that conference fed into the consultation for the Law Commission's the 13th Programme of Law Reform. A second conference was held in association with the Law Commission at the University of Birmingham in 2021 as part of the consultation for the 14th Programme of Law Reform.

In 2023, a memorandum of understanding was agreed between the CLRN Network and the Law Commission in order to facilitate a closer working relationship and the increased exchange of ideas. The MoU has been extended until October 2028.

The reforms proposed at the two conferences have been published as:

- Child, J. J.; Duff, R. A. (November 2018). Criminal Law Reform Now: Proposals and Critique. Hart. ISBN 9781509916771.
- Bone, M.; Child, J. J.; Rogers, J. (May 2024). Criminal Law Reform Now, Volume 2: Proposals and Critique. Hart. ISBN 9781509959181.

== Reforms proposed ==
- CLRNN 1: Review of the Computer Misuse Act 1990
- CLRNN 2: Review of Private Prosecutions
- CLRNN 3: Consent and Deception
- CLRNN 4: The Regulation of Drugs
- CLRNN 5: International Co-Operation and Extradition (ICE)

== See also ==
- Criminal Code of England and Wales

For a complete list of Law Commission reports and papers about substantive criminal law, see Law Commission Criminal Law Reports and Papers.
