= The Wishing Tree (Faulkner book) =

1927 children's book by William Faulkner

The Wishing Tree is a 1927 children's book by William Faulkner. The plot is written as a morality tale.

Faulkner wrote this book for Victoria Franklin, daughter of his sweetheart Estelle Oldham (whom he later married).

== Bibliography ==
- Brodsky, Louis Daniel & Robert W. Hamblin 1985. "A Textual History of Faulkner's 'The Wishing-Tree' and 'The Wishing Tree'." Studies in Bibliography, Volume 38. Fredson Bowers. Charlottesville: University of Virginia Press, 330–74
