= G. Godfrey Phillips =

British barrister and solicitor (1900-1965)

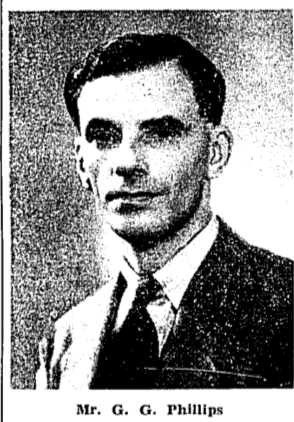

Commissioner General of the Shanghai Municipal Council
- In office 1 July 1939 – 1 March 1942
- Preceded by: Stirling Fessenden
- Succeeded by: Katsuo Okazaki (Honorary)

Personal details
- Born: 7 June 1900 United Kingdom
- Died: 25 October 1965 (aged 65) London, England
- Profession: Lawyer

George Godfrey Phillips CBE (7 June 1900 – 24 October 1965), was a British barrister and, later, solicitor, who served as the Commissioner General of the Shanghai Municipal Council from 1939 to 1942. He was also co-author with E. C. S. Wade of a leading text on constitutional law.

== Early life ==
Phillips was born 7 June 1900 in the United Kingdom, the son of Dr George Charles Phillips of Grantley, Wotton-under-Edge, Gloucestershire and Ethel Nancy Phillips.

He was educated at Harrow School and Trinity College, Cambridge, where he took first class honours in Law Tripos. He was also president of the Cambridge Union. He was called to the bar in 1925 and practiced as a barrister until 1932 when he became town clerk of Stafford.

== Publication ==
In 1931, Phillips was co-author with E. C. S. Wade of Constitutional Law, commonly known as 'Wade and Phillips'.

In 1933 and 1936, he revised two editions of Kenny's Outlines of Criminal Law.

== Marriage ==
Phillips married Betty Mary Bright eldest daughter of Mr and Mrs Trevor Bright, of Henleaze-gardens, Westbury-on-Trym, Bristol in May 1932. They had two sons and a daughter.

== Shanghai Municipal Council ==
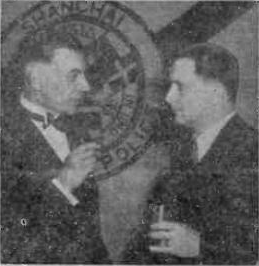
Phillips (left) with Cornell Franklin, Chairman of the SMC, in 1939

Phillips moved to Shanghai in 1934 to take up the position of Secretary to the Shanghai Municipal Council under Secretary General, Stirling Fessenden. On Fessenden's retirement in 1939, he was appointed Secretary and Commissioner General.

In January 1940, Phillips was the subject of an assassination attempt when 3 Chinese men riddled his car with bullets while he was being driven to work.

At the beginning of the Pacific War, on December 8, 1941, Japanese troops occupied the International Settlement. Phillips tendered his resignation to take effect on 1 March 1942. He was granted a maximum pension. Mr Kohei Teraoka (a Japanese consular official who had been appointed deputy secretary in 1941) was appointed Secretary of the Council and Mr Katsuo Okazaki, the chairman to the council, took over the role of Commissioner General in an honorary capacity.

Phillips was repatriated to England in mid-1942.

In 1943 he was made a Commander of the British Empire for his service in Shanghai.

== Career in England ==
He worked in the War Cabinet Office from 1943 before returning to practice at the bar. In 1946 he re-qualified as a solicitor and became of a partner of the firm Linklater and Paines. He later became managing director of Lazard, a director of The Times, chairman of the Equity and Law Life Assurance Society and was a member of the board of a number of industrial companies. He was also a governor of the Harrow School.

== Death ==
Phillips died on 24 October 1965 after a long illness that he had borne with fortitude.
