= James John Lonsdale =

English judge

James John Lonsdale (5 April 1810–11 November 1886) was an English barrister and judge.

== Early life ==
James John Lonsdale (1810–1886), second son of James Lonsdale the artist (1777–1839), was born on 5 April 1810.

== Career ==
In 1833, Lonsdale was appointed secretary to the Royal Commission on the Criminal Law, serving until 1845. In 1845, Lonsdale was appointed secretary to its successor, the Royal Commission on Revising and Consolidating the Criminal Law, serving until 1849.

He was the author of:

- The Statute Criminal Law of England (1839)
- The Odes of Horace. Book 1 a verse translation (1879)

Lonsdale's judicial decisions have been reported by the Solicitors Journal, the Law Times, the Law Journal and the Justice of the Peace.

Lonsdale was called to the bar at Lincoln's Inn on 22 November 1836. He was recorder of Folkestone from 5 August 1847 to the time of his death. He was judge of circuit No. 11 in the West Riding of Yorkshire from 14 February 1855 to 19 March 1867 and judge of circuit No. 48 in Kent from 19 March 1867 to March 1884.

== Death ==
Lonsdale died at The Cottage, Sandgate, Kent, 11 November 1886.
