= Russell on Crime =

Legal treatise of English criminal law published from 1819 to 1964

A Treatise on Crimes and Misdemeanours or Russell on Crime is a book originally written by William Oldnall Russell. For the purpose of citation, its name may be abbreviated to Russ Cr.

Russell's Treatise on Crimes and Misdemeanours, which appeared in 1819 in two volumes in octavo, was pronounced by Warren (Law Student, 2nd edit. p. 620) "the best general treatise in criminal law". A second edition appeared in 1827; a third, edited by C. S. Greaves, in 1843, with a supplement in 1851; a fourth, in 3 volumes, in 1865; and a fifth, edited by S. Prentice, Q.C., in 1877. The American editions, of which seven were issued between 1824 and 1853, do not reproduce the whole work.

In 1847, J G Marvin said of the third London and fifth American editions:

The American editions, excepting the last, do not contain the whole of Russell on Crimes, from the supposed inapplicability, on the part of the editors, of certain parts of the work to this country. Its appreciation among us is best shown by the number of American editions. The notes of American Cases are numerous and able, and no English law book has received more careful and excellent editorial care than Russell on Crimes. Professor Whiteside remarks, that the second volume contains the best summary of the leading principles of the Law of Evidence, especially relating to Criminal Jurisprudence, he has ever met with. It is said to have been drawn up by Mr. Williams, the learned author of the work on Executors. Mr. Warren says, it is the best general Treatise on Criminal Law. 1 Leg. Reporter, 298; Hoff. Leg. Stu. 438; Warren's L. S. 620.

The most recent edition of Russell on Crime was the twelfth edition, which was published in 1964.

== Editors and editions ==
- First Edition (1819). William Oldnall Russell. vol 2.
- First American Edition. 1824. Vols 1 and 2.
- Second Edition (1826). William Oldnall Russell. Vol 1. 1828. Vol 2.
- Third Edition. (1843). C. S. Greaves. Vols 1 and 2.
- Sixth American Edition. 1850. Vols 1 and 2
- Eighth American Edition. 1857. Vols 1 and 2
- Fourth Edition (1865). C. S. Greaves.
- Fifth Edition (1877). S. Prentice.
- Sixth Edition (1896). Horace Smith and A. P. P. Keep.
- Seventh Edition (1909). W. F. Craies and L. W. Kershaw.
- Eighth Edition (1923). R. E. Ross and G. B. McClure.
- Ninth Edition (1936). R. E. Ross.
- Tenth Edition (1950) J. W. Cecil Turner.
- Eleventh Edition (1958). J. W. Cecil Turner. 2 volumes, Stevens & Sons Ltd, 1964.
- Twelfth Edition (1964). J. W. Cecil Turner. 2 volumes, Sweet & Maxwell Ltd, 1964. Google Books

== Reviews ==
- Daniel Davis (1825) 20 North American Review 224 JSTOR
- (1853) 1 American Law Register 448 JSTOR
- W B L (1896) 35 American Law Register and Review (New Series) 679 (Old Series volume 44) JSTOR
- P W H (1924) 2 Cambridge Law Journal 126 JSTOR
- J W C T (1937) 6 Cambridge Law Journal 281 JSTOR
- (1937) 2 University of Toronto Law Journal 200 JSTOR
- A Ll A (1952) 11 Cambridge Law Journal 316 JSTOR
- C (1952) 15 Modern Law Review 260 JSTOR
- Francis A Allen (1952) 43 Journal of Criminal Law, Criminology, and Police Science 228 JSTOR
- Walter P Armstrong Jr (1959) 45 ABA Journal 194 JSTOR
- C (1959) 22 Modern Law Review 708 JSTOR
- Rupert Cross (1964) 22 Cambridge Law Journal 286 JSTOR
- Richard F Sparks (1965) 28 Modern Law Review 497 JSTOR

== See also ==
- Bibliography of English criminal law
