= Criminal Code of England and Wales =

The jurisdiction of England and Wales does not have a criminal code though such an instrument has been often recommended and attempted. The creation of such a code would require both consolidation and codification.

The Law Commission views a comprehensive criminal code as desirable in principle, but not currently feasible as a single undertaking. Its present approach is incremental simplification of discrete offence-areas and procedural law, creating code-ready statutes over time.

== History ==
- 1818 - Parliament petitions the Prince Regent for a Law Commission to consolidate English statute law.
- 1831 - A Royal Commission on the Criminal Law was established to enquire into the possibility of a criminal code. The commission reports in 1835 and there are seven more reports until 1845. A Criminal Law Code Bill is introduced, referred to a Select committee and then dropped.
- 1849 - The Royal Commission on Revising and Consolidating the Criminal Law recommends consolidation.
- 1878 - Sir James Fitzjames Stephen introduces a consolidation Bill in Parliament, which is later withdrawn.
- 1879 - The Royal Commission on the Law Relating to Indictable Offences (1871–1879) under Colin Blackburn, Baron Blackburn recommends and drafts a code.
- 1882 - Since 1844 there had been eight unsuccessful attempts to enact a code.
- 1965 - The Law Commission of England and Wales is established with a remit to review the law of England and Wales:

... with a view to its systematic development and reform, including in particular the codification of [the] law ... and generally the simplification and modernisation of the law.

— A Criminal Code team is set up including academic lawyer Professor Sir John Cyril Smith, the outstanding criminal lawyer of his time.

- 1985 - Draft code published.
- 1989 - Draft code revised and expanded.
- 2002 - Government reiterates its intention to proceed with a code.

== Arguments for a code ==
Attorney-General Sir John Holker said:

Surely, it is a desirable thing that anybody who may want to know the law on a particular subject should be able to turn to a chapter of the Code, and there find the law he is in search of explained in a few intelligible and well-constructed sentences; nor would he have to enter upon a long examination of Russell on Crimes, or Archbold, and other text-books, because he would have a succinct and clear statement before him.

Sir John Smith was, in general an opponent of legal codes but said:

The criminal law is entirely different. It is incoherent and inconsistent. State almost any general principle and you find one or more leading cases which contradict it. It is littered with distinctions which have no basis in reason but are mere historical accidents. I am in favour of codification of the criminal law because I see no other way of reducing a chaotic system to order, of eliminating irrational distinctions and of making the law reasonably comprehensible, accessible and certain. These are all practical objects. Irrational distinctions mean injustice. A is treated differently from B when there is no rational ground for treating him differently; and this is not justice.

== Reports of the royal commissions ==
=== Royal Commission on the Criminal Law ===
- First to Sixth Reports of the Royal Commission on the Criminal Law (1834, 1836, 1837, 1839, 1840, 1841).
- Seventh and Eighth Reports of the Royal Commission on the Criminal Law (1843).

=== Royal Commission on Revising and Consolidating the Criminal Law ===
- First to Fifth Reports of the Royal Commission on Revising and Consolidating the Criminal Law (1845, 1846, 1847, 1847, 1849).

=== Royal Commission on the Law Relating to Indictable Offences ===
- Report of the Royal Commission on the Law Relating to Indictable Offences (1879).

== Law Commission reports and papers ==
=== Codification of the Criminal Law: Law Com. Nos 143 and 177 ===
Sources:

- LC 143 (1985). Codification of the Criminal Law: a Report to the Law Commission.
- LC177(1) (1989). A Criminal Code for England and Wales (Vol. 1: Report and Draft Criminal Code Bill).
- LC177(2) (1989). A Criminal Code for England and Wales (Vol. 2: Commentary on Draft Criminal Code Bill).
- Hansard Debates, House of Lords, Vol 508 (22 May 1989), Col 2 56 ‘Law Commission Report No 177’.

For a complete list of Law Commission reports and papers about criminal law generally, see Law Commission Criminal Law Reports and Papers.

== Suggested reading ==
=== Books ===
- Bohlander, Michael; Birkett, Daley (Eds) (2014). The Codification of Criminal Law.
- Smith, K. J. M. (1998). Lawyers, legislators, and theorists: developments in English criminal jurisprudence 1800-1957.
- Robinson, Paul H. (1997). Structure and Function in Criminal Law.
- Cornish, W.R. and Clarke, G. de N. (1989). Law and Society in England 1750–1950.
- Lang, Maurice Eugen (1924). Codification in the British Empire and America.
- Stephen, James Fitzjames. (1877). A Digest of the Criminal Law (Crimes and Punishments).
- Cottu, Charles. (1800). On the Administration of the Criminal Code in England, and the Spirit of the English Government.
- Schofield, Philip; Harris, Jonathan (Eds). Legislator of the world: writings on codification, law, and education (The Collected Works of Jeremy Bentham).

=== Chapters in books ===
- Cross, Sir Rupert. (1978). Pages 5–20: The Reports of the Criminal Law Commissioners (1833-1849) and the Abortive Bills of 1853 in Reshaping the Criminal Law: Essays in Honour of Glanville Williams.
- Clive, Eric. (2010). Chapter 4 (pp. 54–69): Codification of the Criminal Law in Essays in Criminal Law in Honour of Sir Gerald Gordon.
- Clarkson, Chris. (2011). Recent Law Reform and Codification of the General Principles of Criminal Law in England and Wales: A Tale of Woe in Codification, Macaulay and the Indian Penal Code: The Legacies and Modern Challenges of Criminal Law Reform.
- Herring, J. (2022: 10th end). Chapter 1 in Criminal Law: Text, Cases, and Materials.

=== Journal articles ===
- Chalmers, James. (2014). Frenzied Law Making: Overcriminalization by Numbers (2014) 67(1) Current Legal Problems.
- Lavery, Jenny. (2010). Codification of the Criminal Law: An Attainable Ideal? (2010) 74(6) J. Crim. L. 557.
- Ferguson, Pamela R. (2009). Constructing a criminal code (2009) 20(1) Crim. L.F. 139.
- Dennis, Ian. (2009). RIP: The Criminal Code (1968-2008) (Editorial) [2009] Crim. L.R. 1-2.
- Ferguson, Pamela R. (2009). Codifying criminal law: the Scots and English draft codes compared [2004] Crim. L.R. 105-119.
- Samuels, Alex. (2003). Why do we not have a criminal code? (2003) 67(3) J. Crim. L. 214-219.
- Dennis, Ian. (2003). The Law Commission and codification of the criminal law: Part 35 (Editorial) [2003] Crim. L.R. 431-432.
- Dennis, Ian. (2001). Reviving the criminal code (Editorial) [2001] Crim. L.R. 261-264.
- Farmer, Lindsay (2000). Reconstructing the English Codification Debate: The Criminal Law Commissioners, 1833–45 (2000) 18(2) Law and History Review 397–442.
- Robinson, Paul H. (2000). Structuring Criminal Codes to Perform Their Function (2000) 4(1) Buff. Crim. L.R. 1.
- Arden, Mary (1999). Criminal law at the crossroads: the impact of human rights from the Law Commission's perspective and the need for a code [1999] Crim. L.R. 439-459.
- Bingham of Cornhill, Lord Justice. (1998). A criminal code: must we wait for ever? [1998] Crim. L.R. 694-696.
- Smith, J.C. (1995). The Law Commission's Criminal Law Bill: a good start for the Criminal Code [1995] Stat. L.R. 105-108.
- Brooke, Henry (1995). The Role of the Law Commission in Simplifying Statute Law (1995) 16(1) Stat. L.R. 1.
- Samuels, Alec. (1992). Drafting the criminal code (1992) 13(3) Stat. L.R. 229-239.
- Gardiner, Simon. (1992). Reiterating the Criminal Code (1992) 55(6) M.L.R. 839-847.
- Wells, Celia. (1992). Moral boundaries and criminal codes (1992) 142(6564) N.L.J. 1133-1134.
- Ashworth, Andrew. (1992). Legislating the criminal code [1992] Crim. L.R. 393-395.
- Smith, A.T.H. (1992). Legislating the criminal code: the Law Commission's proposals [1992] Crim. L.R. 396-406.
- Ashworth, Andrew. (1990). Codifying English criminal law (Editorial) [1990] Crim. L.R. 141-142.
- Midland Circuit. (1990). Lord Chief Justice Cockburn's letters on the Criminal Code Bill of 1879 [1990] Crim. L.R. 315-317.
- de Burca, Grainne, and Gardner, Simon (1990). The codification of the criminal law (1990) 10(4) O.J.L.S. 559-571.
- Cowley, David. (1990). Codification of the criminal law (1990) 54(1) J. Crim. L. 98-99.
- Ashworth, Andrew. (1989). A criminal code for England and Wales (Editorial) [1989] 393-394.
- Editorial. (1989). Criminal law codification (1989) 139(6404) NLJ 529.
- Buxton, Richard. (1989). The Law Commission's Criminal Code (1989) 139(6407) N.L.J. 639-640.
- Smith, J.C. (1987). Codification of the criminal law [1987] Denning L.J. 137-150.
- Smith, A.T.H. (1986). Codification of the criminal law - Part 1: The case for a code [1986] Crim. L.R. 285-295.
- Bennion, Francis. (1986). Codification of the criminal law - Part 2: The technique of codification [1986] Crim. L.R. 295-302.
- Ashworth, Andrew. (1986). Codification of the criminal law - Part 3: The draft code, complicity and the inchoate offences [1986] Crim. L.R. 303-314.
- Wells, Celia. (1986). Codification of the criminal law - Part 4: Restatement or reform [1986] Crim. L.R. 314-323.
- Wasik, Martin (1986). Codification: mental disorder and intoxication under the draft criminal code (1986) 50(4) J. Crim. L. 393-404.
- Clarkson, C.M.V., and Keating, H.M. (1986). Codification: offences against the person under the draft criminal code (1986) 50(4) J. Crim. L. 405-431.
- Ashworth, Andrew (1984). Influences on the Creation of Criminal Law and Criminal Policy in England (1984) 13(2) J. Crim. L.955-111.
- Friedland M L, ‘R S Wright’s Model Criminal Code: A Forgotten Chapter in the History of the Criminal Law’ (1981) 1 Oxford J Legal Stud 307.
- Shapiro, Barbara (1974). ‘Codification of the Laws in Seventeenth-Century England’ (1974) Wis. L. Rev. 428.
- Smith, K.J.M. (1975). The Law Commission Working Paper No. 55 on Codification of the Criminal Law, Defences of General Application: Official Investigation and Entrapment [1975] Crim.L.R. 12.
- Andrews J.A. (1969). Codification of Criminal Offences [1969] Crim. L.R. 59.
- Scarman, Leslie (1967) Codification and Judge-Made Law: A Problem of Coexistence [1967] 42 Indiana Law Journal 3.
- Stone, Ferdinand Fairfax (1955). A Primer on Codification (1955) 29 Tul. L. Rev. 303.

== See also ==
- Law reform
- Royal Commission on the Criminal Law (1833-1845)
- Royal Commission on Revising and Consolidating the Criminal Law (1845-1849)
- Royal Commission for Revising and Consolidating the Criminal Law (1871–1879)
- Criminal Law Revision Committee
- Law Commission of England and Wales
- Criminal Law Reform Now Network (CLRNN)
