= Lowndean Professor of Astronomy and Geometry =

The Lowndean chair of Astronomy and Geometry is one of the two major Professorships in Astronomy (alongside the Plumian Professorship) and a major Professorship in Mathematics at Cambridge University. It was founded in 1749 by Thomas Lowndes, an astronomer from Overton in Cheshire.

The original bequest stated that the holder must give two courses of twenty lectures each year, one in astronomy, and the other in geometry, and spend at least six weeks making astronomical observations.

Originally the holder was elected by a committee consisting of the Lord Chancellor, the Lord President of the Privy Council, the Lord Privy Seal, the Lord Steward of the Household, and the Lord High Treasurer of the First Lord of the Treasury.

By the 20th century, the electors had changed to comprise the most senior scientists in the United Kingdom: the President of the Royal Society, the President of the Royal Astronomical Society, the Astronomer Royal, the Vice Chancellor of the University of Cambridge, and the Lucasian, Sadleirian, and Plumian Professors.

Notwithstanding the title, a professor can be chosen who specializes solely or chiefly in only one, rather than both, of the subjects of astronomy and geometry.

== Lowndean Professors ==
- 1750–1771 Roger Long
- 1771–1795 John Smith
- 1795–1837 William Lax
- 1837–1859 George Peacock
- 1859–1892 John Couch Adams
- 1892–1913 Robert Stawell Ball
- 1914–1936 H. F. Baker
- 1936–1970 W. V. D. Hodge
- 1970–1989 J. Frank Adams
- 1990–1999 Graeme Segal
- 2000–2014 Burt Totaro
- 2015-present Mihalis Dafermos
