= Charles Sprengel Greaves =

Charles Sprengel Greaves MA QC (1802–1881), eldest son of William Greaves MD (1771–1848) of Mayfield, Staffordshire, by his first wife, Anne-Lydia, was born at Burton on 18 July 1802. He entered Rugby School on 18 July 1816 and matriculated at Queen's College, Oxford on 27 February 1819, graduating BA on 25 November 1823 (in the lower portion of the second class in classics) and MA on 13 April 1825. Greaves was called to the bar by the Society of Lincoln's Inn on 22 November 1827, entered the Inner Temple ad eundem in 1828, and attended the Oxford Circuit and Gloucester Sessions. He became Queen's counsel on 28 February 1850, but by then he had for many years ceased to practise. He became a bencher of Lincoln's Inn on 15 April 1850. He was a magistrate and deputy lieutenant for Staffordshire, and also a magistrate for the county of Derby. He was the draftsman of the Criminal Procedure Act 1851 and the Criminal Law Consolidation Acts 1861. He became a Secretary to the Criminal Law Commission in 1878. He died at 11 Blandford Square, London, on 3 June 1881.

On 11 February 1841 he married Emma Frances Tyson (d. 1880), daughter of William Tyson of Ashbourne by his wife Lucia-Elizabeth.

Greaves edited the third and fourth editions of Russell on Crime and was, in this capacity, "a distinguished writer" on the subject of criminal law. He was the author of:

- The Act for Conviction of Juvenile Offenders, 11 Vict. c. 82, London, 1847, 12mo. By 1870, Greaves' Treatise on the Juvenile Offenders Act was not only out of print, but had to some extent been rendered obsolete by the passing of Jervis' and other Acts.
- Lord Campbell's Acts for the further improving the Administration of Justice, London, 1851, r 8vo
- The Criminal Law Consolidation and Amendment Acts of the 24 and 25 of Victoria, London, 1861, 12mo, 2nd ed, 1862, Post 8vo
- The Proper Time for the Publication of Banns of Matrimony, in the Morning Service, London, 1867, 8vo
- A Review of the Statutes, Rubrics and Cannons relating to Clerical Vestments, London, 1867, 8vo.

Greaves was, with James John Lonsdale, joint author of A Letter to the Lord Chancellor, London, 1854, 8vo.

Greaves was a man "of high legal attainments" and was "known as a gentleman of great learning, ability, and research".

Greaves was a "splendid polymath". He was an antiquarian. He was a member of the Archaeological Institute and the Derbyshire Archaeological and Natural History Society.
