= Royal Commission on the Law Relating to Indictable Offences (1871–1879) =

The Royal Commission on the Law Relating to Indictable Offences (also known as the Criminal Code Commission, the Royal Commission on the Criminal Code or the Blackburn Commission) was a royal commission that ran from 1871 to 1879 to consolidate existing statutes and enactments of English criminal law.

The Commission followed the earlier Royal Commission on Revising and Consolidating the Criminal Law (1845–1849) (which had not been successful) and also the Criminal Law Consolidation Acts 1861 (24 & 25 Vict. cc. 94–100) (commonly known as Peel's Acts).

The commissioners were Lord Blackburn, Sir James Fitzjames Stephen, Sir John Mellor, Sir Henry James, Henry Thring and Arthur Hobhouse. Five reports were produced from 1871 to 1879.

In 1878 Sir James Fitzjames Stephen introduced his own Code of Criminal Law and Procedure in 1878 which was read on Tuesday 14 May 1878 and at second reading but was then withdrawn

The Commission's final report included a draft Criminal Code (Indictable Offences) Bill. The Bill was introduced and had its first reading in the House of Commons on 3 April 1879. The Bill reached a second reading in that year and in 1880 and was then referred to a Select Committee. However, further proceedings of the Bill were stopped when Parliament was dissolved in March 1880 by Prime Minister Benjamin Disraeli on the calling of a general election.
