= Halsbury's Laws =

Halsbury's Laws is the name of a legal encyclopaedia produced by LexisNexis Butterworths.

- Halsbury's Laws of England
- Halsbury's Laws of Australia
- Halsbury's Laws of Canada
- Halsbury's Laws of Hong Kong
