= Halsbury (disambiguation) =

Halsbury may refer to:

- Halsbury, an historic estate in Devon
- Halsbury's Laws of England
- Halsbury's Laws of Australia
- Halsbury's Statutes
- Halsbury's Statutory Instruments
- Hardinge Giffard, 1st Earl of Halsbury
- Halsbury, Alberta, a locality in Canada
