= Halsbury's Laws of Hong Kong =

- Language: English
- Subject: Law
- Publisher: LexisNexis Butterworths
- Publication date: 1995 to date
- Publication place: Hong Kong

Halsbury's Laws of Hong Kong is an encyclopaedia on the laws of Hong Kong–based on the model of the Halsbury's Laws of England and is currently the only encyclopaedic legal work in Hong Kong. It covers 80 subject areas and is written by prominent legal experts in Hong Kong.

== Related publications ==
- Halsbury's Laws of England
- Halsbury's Laws of Australia
- Halsbury's Laws of Canada
- Halsbury's Laws of Singapore
- Halsbury's Laws of Malaysia
- Halsbury's Laws of India
- Halsbury's Laws of New Zealand
- The Laws of Scotland: Stair Memorial Encyclopaedia
