= Halsbury's Laws of England =

Legal encyclopedia

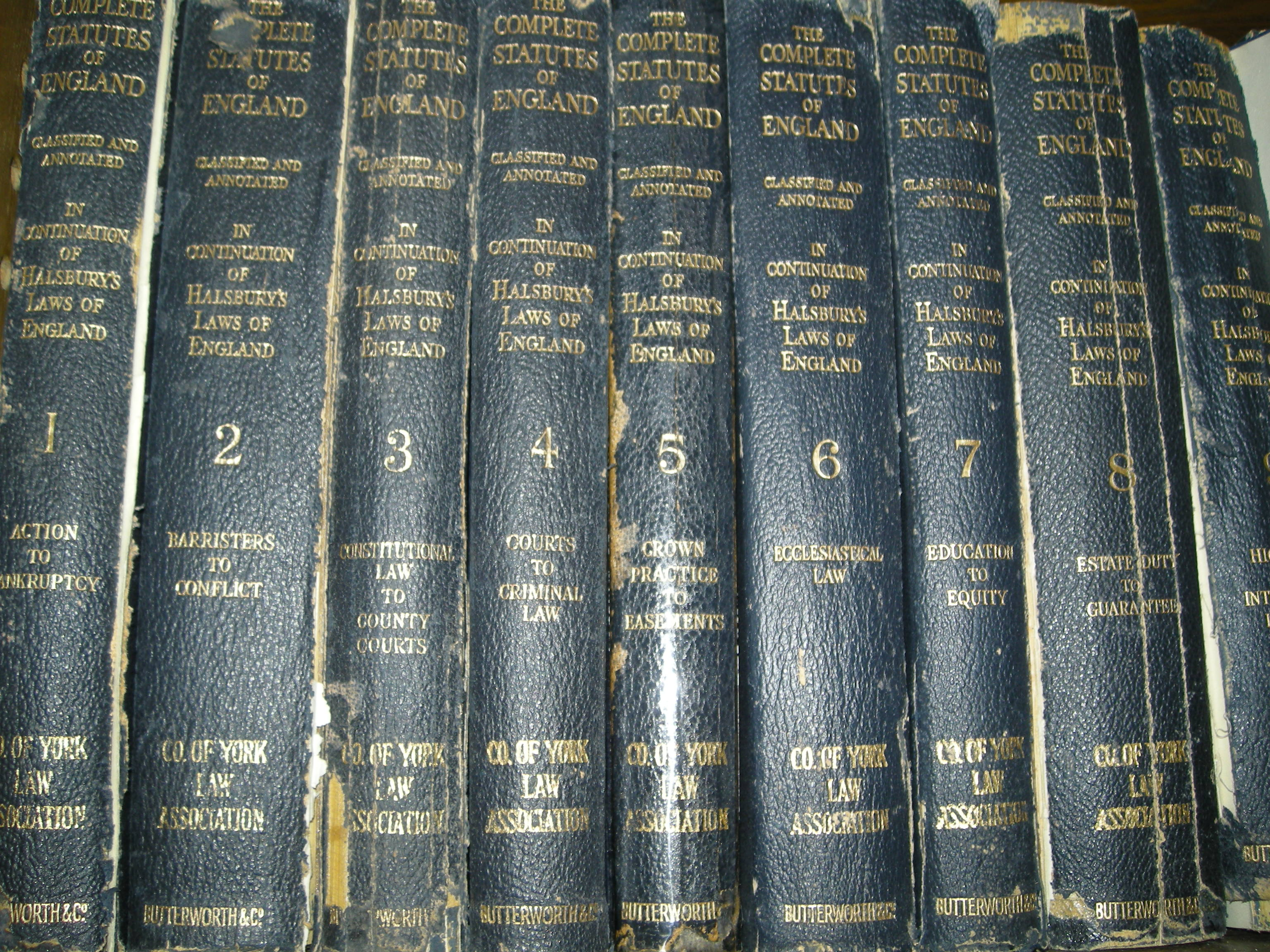
- Language: English
- Subject: Law
- Publisher: LexisNexis Butterworths (an imprint of Reed Elsevier)
- Publication date: 1907 to date
- Publication place: United Kingdom

Halsbury's Laws of England is an encyclopaedia of the law in England and Wales. It has an alphabetised title scheme for the areas of law, drawing on authorities including Acts of Parliament of the United Kingdom, Measures of the Welsh Assembly, UK case law and European law. It is written by or in consultation with experts in the relevant field.

Halsbury's Laws has an annual and monthly updating service. The encyclopaedia and updates are available in both hard copy and online, with some content available for free online.

== History ==
Editors-in-Chief
- Lord Halsbury: 1907 to 1917
- Lord Hailsham: 1931 to 1942
- Viscount Simonds: 1952 to 1964
- Lord Hailsham of St Marylebone: 1973 to 1997
- Lord Mackay of Clashfern: 1997 to 2026

In 1907 Stanley Shaw Bond, editor at Butterworths, began a project to produce a complete statement of the law of England and Wales that was authoritative, comprehensive and up-to-date. Bond tracked down the former Lord Chancellor, The Earl of Halsbury, on holiday in Nice to invite him to be the editor-in-chief of The Laws of England.

Traditionally, the role of editor-in-chief of Halsbury's Laws is held by a former Lord Chancellor, and the most recent incumbent was Lord Mackay of Clashfern.

In 2007, Halsbury's Laws celebrated its centenary with an evening of seminars led by Lord Mackay of Clashfern and professor Richard Susskind, and the publication of a collection of centenary essays.

== Editions ==
=== First edition ===
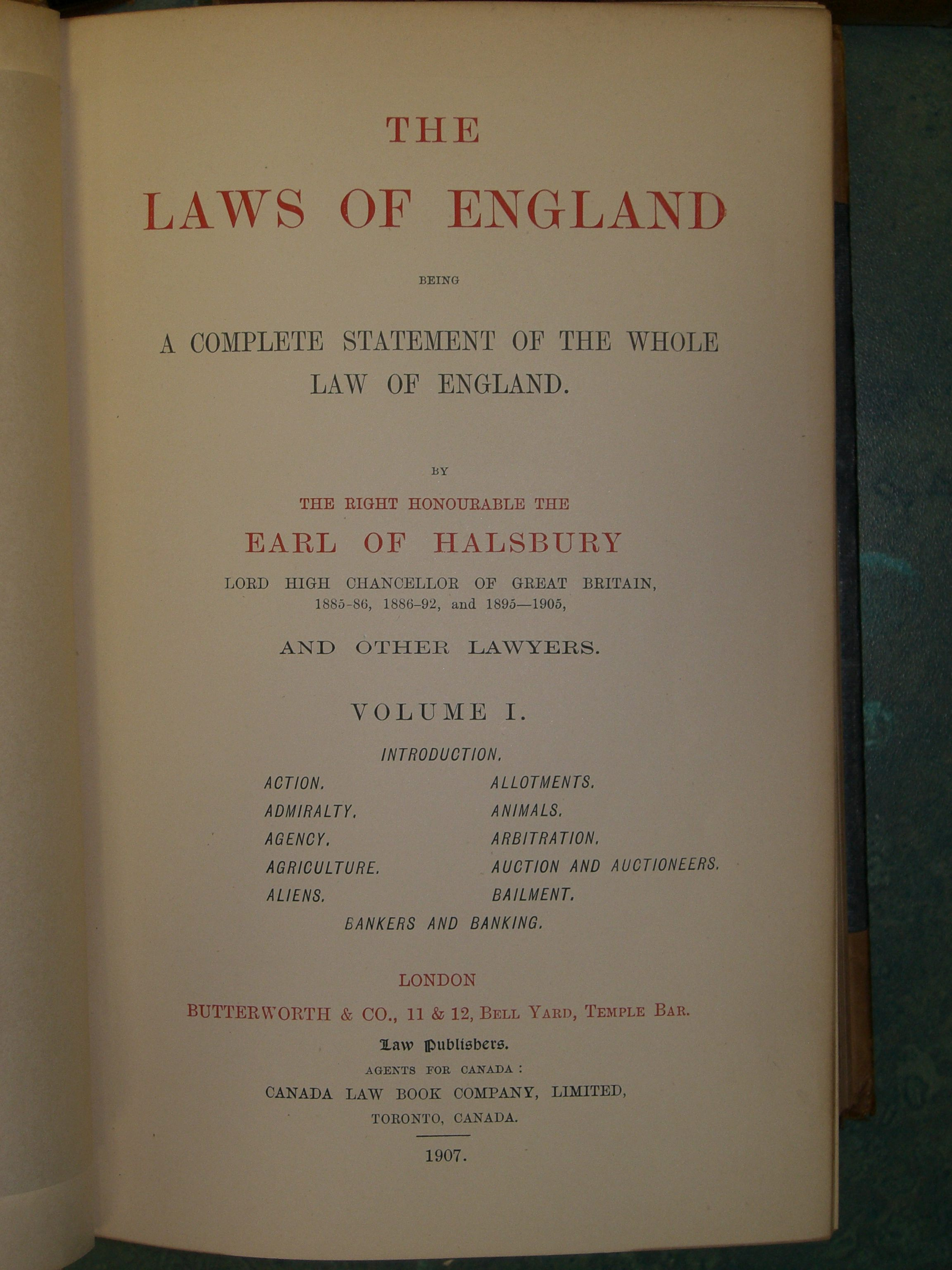
The title and copyright page of volume 1 of the first edition of Halsbury's Laws of England (1907)

The first edition was published in 31 volumes from 1907 to 1917. Since then, new editions have been launched at intervals of about 20 to 30 years.

Volume 1 was published in 1907. Its articles run from action to bankers and banking. The volume deals with action, admiralty, agency, agriculture, aliens, allotments, animals, arbitration, auction, bailment and bankers and banking.

Volume 2 was published in 1908. Its articles run from bankruptcy to bills of exchange. It contains but four treatises, upon bankruptcy and insolvency (335 pages), barristers (67 pages), bastardy (28 pages) and bills of exchange, promissory notes and negotiable instruments (124 pages).

Volume 5 (companies) is devoted entirely to company law, and forms a treatise of 768 pages on that subject. After a general consideration of the nature and domicile of companies, the work considers briefly the history of company legislation. Then follows an elaborate treatise on the Companies Act 1908. Special companies, like banking, insurance and public service companies, are considered; as well as chartered companies, the livery companies of the City of London, quasi-corporations, and illegal companies; and a few pages are devoted to foreign companies. The reviewer in the Harvard Law Review thought the table of cases cited must contain at least five thousand cases. He said the importance of this treatise was at once apparent; and that to the commercial lawyer in the Eastern cities of the United States it would be exceedingly useful.

The articles in volume 11 run from descent to ecclesiastical law. It contains a short article on descent and distribution; a discussion of discovery, inspection and interrogatories, under the English practice; an elaborate article on distress; an article on easements and profits, which the Harvard Law Review said was the most interesting article in the volume to an American lawyer; and an elaborate disquisition on ecclesiastical law.

The articles in volume 12 run from education to electric lighting and power. The Harvard Law Review said that the articles on education and elections had comparatively little value to the American bar, but the hundred pages devoted to electric lighting and power were useful.

Volume 20 was published in 1911. Its articles run from markets to misrepresentation. It contains articles on markets and fairs (59 pages), master and servant (221 pages), medicine and pharmacy (82 pages), the Metropolis (106 pages), mines, minerals and quarries (156 pages) and misrepresentation and fraud (110 pages). According to the Harvard Law Review, the article on master and servant was of constant interest to an American lawyer; and that on misrepresentation and fraud, from the master hand of G. Spencer Bower, was a valuable treatise in itself.

Volume 21 was published in 1912. Its articles run from mistake to partition. It contains articles on mistake (34 pages), money and money lending (29 pages), mortgage (283 pages), negligence (134 pages), notaries (9 pages), nuisance (72 pages), Parliament (197 pages) and partition (59 pages). The Harvard Law Review said that the standard set by the preceding volumes appeared to be maintained and that the series, up to this volume, was a collection of very admirable treatises on English law.

=== Second, third and fourth editions ===
The second edition was published in 37 volumes from 1932 to 1941. The editor-in-chief was Viscount Hailsham. The managing editor was Sir Roland Burrows. The second edition of volume 5 was published in 1949. The second and subsequent editions of the encyclopaedia took the name of the said Earl of Halsbury.

The third edition was published in 43 volumes from 1952 to 1964. The general editor was Lord Simonds.

The fourth edition was published in 56 volumes from 1973 to 1987. The editor-in-chief was Lord Hailsham of St Marylebone. The editor-in-chief of volumes reissued from August 1998 onwards was Lord Mackay of Clashfern.

=== Fifth edition ===
Publication of the fifth edition began in 2008 and is being published in 103 volumes. It will have a new title scheme, a new updating service, and improved integration of European law. New titles for the fifth edition include, Sports Law, Information Technology Law, Financial Services and Institutions, Judicial Review and Environmental Quality and Public Health.

== Halsbury Legal Awards ==
The Halsbury Legal Awards debuted in 2013. They celebrate the value that people in law bring to society. The theme of the awards is: "The Whole of the law. Connected".

The awards recognise the achievements and talents of individuals and teams across the entire legal sector. The Bar, legal practice, in-house counsel, academia and legal journalism are all recognised, as are contribution to the promotion, growth and value of the sector.

== Halsbury Awards ==
The Halsbury Awards, in association with the British and Irish Association of Law Librarians, were sponsored by Halsbury's Laws from 2007 to 2012. They recognise outstanding performance given by legal information services, law libraries and teams managing legal collections and resources.

== Related publications ==
- Halsbury's Laws of Australia
- Halsbury's Laws of Canada
- Halsbury's Laws of Singapore
- Halsbury's Laws of Malaysia
- Halsbury's Laws of Hong Kong
- Halsbury's Laws of India
- Halsbury's Laws of New Zealand
- The Laws of Scotland: Stair Memorial Encyclopaedia

== See also ==
- Halsbury's Statutes
- Halsbury's Statutory Instruments
- Is it in Force?
- Destination Tables
- LexisNexis Butterworths

== Bibliography ==
- Marke, J J. A Catalogue of the Law Collection at New York University. New York University. 1953.
