= Stanley Bond =

Stanley Bond may refer to:

- Stanley Ray Bond (1944–1972), American anti-Vietnam War activist and bank robber
- Stanley Shaw Bond (1877–1943), English publisher
