= Statute Law Revision Act 1964 =

Act of the Parliament of the United Kingdom

Statute Law Revision Act 1964 (Note: Section 3.)
- Act of Parliament
- Parliament of the United Kingdom
- Long title: An Act to revise the statute law by repealing obsolete, spent, unnecessary or superseded enactments.
- Citation: 1964 c. 79
- Territorial extent: United Kingdom

Dates
- Royal assent: 31 July 1964
- Commencement: 31 July 1964 (Note: The Acts of Parliament (Commencement) Act 1793)
- Repealed: 27 June 1974
Other legislation
Amends	See § Repealed enactments
Repeals/revokes	See § Repealed enactments
Amended by	Northern Ireland Constitution Act 1973
Repealed by	Statute Law (Repeals) Act 1974
Relates to	Repeal of Obsolete Statutes Act 1856; Criminal Statutes Repeal Act 1861; See Statute Law Revision Act

Status: Repealed

Text of statute as originally enacted

The Statute Law Revision Act 1964 (c. 79) was an act of the Parliament of the United Kingdom.

== Provisions ==
=== Repealed enactments ===
Section 1 of the act repealed 160 enactments, listed in the schedule to the act.

Citation	Short title	Extent of repeal
Commonwealth Enactments
6 Geo. 3. c. 12	American Colonies Act 1766	The whole act.
22 Geo. 3. c. 75	Colonial Leave of Absence Act 1782	The whole act.
1 & 2 Geo. 4. c. 28	West Africa Act 1821	The whole act.
9 Geo. 4. c. 74	Criminal Law (India) Act 1828	The whole act.
16 & 17 Vict. c. 86	Liberated Africans Act 1853	The whole act.
25 & 26 Vict. c. 55	Jamaica Loan Act 1862	The whole act.
31 & 32 Vict. c. 26	Indian Railway Companies Act 1868	The whole act.
35 & 36 Vict. c. 19	Pacific Islanders Protection Act 1872	The whole act.
36 & 37 Vict. c. 43	Indian Railway Companies Act 1873	The whole act.
38 & 39 Vict. c. 51	Pacific Islanders Protection Act 1875	In section 1, the words from "shall be construed" to "each of them" and the word "separately". Sections 2 to 5 and 8 to 10.
39 & 40 Vict. c. 46	Slave Trade Act 1876	The whole act.
42 & 43 Vict. c. 41	Indian Guaranteed Railways Act 1879	The whole act.
50 & 51 Vict. c. 11	Conversion of India Stock Act 1887	The whole act.
Consolidated Fund and Appropriation Enactments
11 & 12 Geo. 6. c. 18	Consolidated Fund (No. 1) Act 1948	The whole act.
11 & 12 Geo. 6. c. 50	Appropriation Act 1948	The whole act.
12, 13 & 14 Geo. 6. c. 24	Consolidated Fund (No. 1) Act 1949	The whole act.
12, 13 & 14 Geo. 6. c. 48	Appropriation Act 1949	The whole act.
14 Geo. 6. c. 1	Consolidated Fund Act 1950	The whole act.
14 Geo. 6. c. 16	Appropriation Act 1950	The whole act.
14 & 15 Geo. 6. c. 12	Consolidated Fund Act 1951	The whole act.
14 & 15 Geo. 6. c. 16	Consolidated Fund (No. 2) Act 1951	The whole act.
14 & 15 Geo. 6. c. 44	Appropriation Act 1951	The whole act.
15 & 16 Geo. 6 & 1 Eliz. 2. c. 1	Consolidated Fund (No. 3) Act 1951	The whole act.
15 & 16 Geo. 6 & 1 Eliz. 2. c. 16	Consolidated Fund Act 1952	The whole act.
15 & 16 Geo. 6 & 1 Eliz. 2. c. 38	Appropriation Act 1952	The whole act.
1 & 2 Eliz. 2. c. 6	Consolidated Fund Act 1953	The whole act.
1 & 2 Eliz. 2. c. 8	Consolidated Fund (No. 2) Act 1953	The whole act.
1 & 2 Eliz. 2. c. 35	Appropriation Act 1953	The whole act.
2 & 3 Eliz. 2. c. 2	Consolidated Fund (No. 3) Act 1953	The whole act.
2 & 3 Eliz. 2. c. 22	Consolidated Fund Act 1954	The whole act.
2 & 3 Eliz. 2. c. 45	Appropriation Act 1954	The whole act.
3 & 4 Eliz. 2. c. 3	Consolidated Fund Act 1955	The whole act.
3 & 4 Eliz. 2. c. 16	Appropriation Act 1955	The whole act.
4 & 5 Eliz. 2. c. 3	Appropriation (No. 2) Act 1955	The whole act.
4 & 5 Eliz. 2. c. 32	Consolidated Fund Act 1956	The whole act.
4 & 5 Eliz. 2. c. 55	Appropriation Act 1956	The whole act.
5 & 6 Eliz. 2. c. 7	Consolidated Fund Act 1957	The whole act.
5 & 6 Eliz. 2. c. 10	Consolidated Fund (No. 2) Act 1957	The whole act.
5 & 6 Eliz. 2. c. 63	Appropriation Act 1957	The whole act except sections 6 and 7.
6 & 7 Eliz. 2. c. 7	Consolidated Fund Act 1958	The whole act.
6 & 7 Eliz. 2. c. 18	Consolidated Fund (No. 2) Act 1958	The whole act.
6 & 7 Eliz. 2. c. 57	Appropriation Act 1958	The whole act.
7 & 8 Eliz. 2. c. 15	Consolidated Fund Act 1959	The whole act.
7 & 8 Eliz. 2. c. 59	Appropriation Act 1959	The whole act.
8 & 9 Eliz. 2. c. 10	Consolidated Fund Act 1960	The whole act.
8 & 9 Eliz. 2. c. 45	Appropriation Act 1960	The whole act.
9 & 10 Eliz. 2. c. 7	Consolidated Fund Act 1961	The whole act.
9 & 10 Eliz. 2. c. 12	Consolidated Fund (No. 2) Act 1961	The whole act.
9 & 10 Eliz. 2. c. 59	Appropriation Act 1961	The whole act.
10 & 11 Eliz. 2. c. 7	Consolidated Fund Act 1962	The whole act.
10 & 11 Eliz. 2. c. 11	Consolidated Fund (No. 2) Act 1962	The whole act.
10 & 11 Eliz. 2. c. 45	Appropriation Act 1962	The whole act.
Defence Loans Enactments
1 Edw. 8 & 1 Geo. 6. c. 13	Defence Loans Act 1937	The whole act.
2 & 3 Geo. 6. c. 8	Defence Loans Act 1939	The whole act.
2 & 3 Geo. 6. c. 31	Civil Defence Act 1939	Section 83(2).
2 & 3 Geo. 6. c. 38	Ministry of Supply Act 1939	Section 16(2).
2 & 3 Geo. 6. c. 117	National Loans Act 1939	In Schedule 1, the words "Section one of the Defence Loans Act 1937 (1 Edw. 8. & 1 Geo. 6. c. 13)".
Ecclesiastical Enactments
1 Geo. 1. Stat. 2. c. 10	Queen Anne's Bounty Act 1714	The preamble. Sections 1, 3, 10 to 13, 16, 19 and 20.
43 Geo. 3. c. 107	Queen Anne's Bounty Act 1803	The whole act.
45 Geo. 3. c. 84	Queen Anne's Bounty Act 1805	The whole act.
1 & 2 Vict. c. 20	Queen Anne's Bounty Act 1838	The whole act, except sections 20, 21 and 22.
3 & 4 Vict. c. 113	Ecclesiastical Commissioners Act 1840	Sections 75 and 78 to 82.
4 & 5 Vict. c. 39	Ecclesiastical Commissioners Act 1841	Section 27.
13 & 14 Vict. c. 94	Ecclesiastical Commissioners Act 1850	In section 1, the words from "and every Church Estates Commissioner shall" onwards. In section 4, the words from "unless" to "mentioned". Sections 5 to 7, 10 to 15, 22, 23 and 26.
14 & 15 Vict. c. 104	Episcopal and Capitular Estates Act 1851	The whole act.
17 & 18 Vict. c. 116	Episcopal and Capitular Estates Act 1854	The whole act.
19 & 20 Vict. c. 55	Church Building Commissioners (Transfer of Powers) Act 1856	The whole act.
21 & 22 Vict. c. 57	Ecclesiastical Leasing Act 1858	Section 6.
22 & 23 Vict. c. 46	Episcopal and Capitular Estates Act 1859	Section 1.
23 & 24 Vict. c. 124	Ecclesiastical Commissioners Act 1860	The whole act, except sections 12 to 15, and 42.
29 & 30 Vict. c. 111	Ecclesiastical Commissioners Act 1866	Sections 3 to 5, 12, 13 and 19.
31 & 32 Vict. c. 114	Ecclesiastical Commission Act 1868	Sections 5 to 8, 11 and 15.
12 & 13 Geo. 5. c. 50	Expiring Laws Act 1922	In Schedule 1, the entry numbered (4).
1926 No. 4	Ecclesiastical Commissioners Measure 1926	Sections 3, 7, 8, 9 and the Schedule.
1928 No. 2	Tithe (Administration of Trusts) Measure 1928	The whole measure except sections 6 and 17.
26 Geo. 5 & 1 Edw. 8. c. 43	Tithe Act 1936	Section 46.
1936 No. 5	Ecclesiastical Commissioners (Powers) Measure 1936	In section 3, in subsection (1), the words from the beginning to "and also" and the words "by instrument under their seal", and subsection (2).
1937 No. 1	Queen Anne's Bounty (Powers) Measure 1937	In section 2(2), the words "or to moneys standing to the credit of a benefice in the Tithe Revenue Account of Queen Anne's Bounty by virtue of the Tithe (Administration of Trusts) Measure 1928". Sections 10 to 13.
1939 No. 1	Queen Anne's Bounty (Powers) Measure 1939	Sections 2 and 6.
1942 No. 2	Loans (Postponement of Repayment) Measure 1942	The whole measure.
1944 No. 1	Emergency Legislation Measure 1944	The whole measure.
1960 No. 1	Church Property (Miscellaneous Provisions) Measure 1960	Section 19(3) and (4).
Excess Profits Duty Enactments
5 & 6 Geo. 5. c. 89	Finance (No. 2) Act 1915	Sections 38 to 44. Section 45(1) to (7). Schedule 4.
6 & 7 Geo. 5. c. 24	Finance Act 1916	Part III. In section 69(1), the words from "Part III of this Act" onwards.
7 & 8 Geo. 5. c. 31	Finance Act 1917	Part III. In section 34, in subsection (1), the words "or excess profits duty or munitions Exchequer payments" (in both places where they occur) and the words "may specify different securities in respect of different duties and payments, and", and in subsection (4), the proviso. In section 38(1), the words "Part III of this Act shall be construed together with Part III of the Finance (No. 2) Act 1915".
8 & 9 Geo. 5. c. 15	Finance Act 1918	Part III. In section 45(1), the words from "Part III of this Act" onwards.
9 & 10 Geo. 5. c. 32	Finance Act 1919	Part IV. In section 38(1), the words from "Part IV of this Act" onwards.
10 & 11 Geo. 5. c. 18	Finance Act 1920	Parts IV and V. Section 61, except in so far as it relates to income tax. In section 64(1), the words from "Part IV of this Act" onwards.
11 & 12 Geo. 5. c. 32	Finance Act 1921	Part III. In section 65(1), the words "Part III of this Act shall be construed together with Part III of the Finance (No. 2) Act 1915". Schedules 1 and 2.
12 & 13 Geo. 5. c. 17	Finance Act 1922	Part III.
14 & 15 Geo. 5. c. 21	Finance Act 1924	Section 34.
16 & 17 Geo. 5. c. 22	Finance Act 1926	Part V.
17 & 18 Geo. 5. c. 42	Statute Law Revision Act 1927	The Schedule.
23 & 24 Geo. 5. c. 19	Finance Act 1933	Section 44.
15 & 16 Geo. 6 & 1 Eliz. 2. c. 10	Income Tax Act 1952	Section 530(1)(c).
Land Improvement Enactments
12 & 13 Vict. c. xci	General Land Drainage and Improvement Company's Act 1849	The whole act.
23 & 24 Vict. c. clxix	Land Loan and Enfranchisement Company's Act 1860	The whole act.
27 & 28 Vict. c. 114	Improvement of Land Act 1864	The words (immediately before section 78) "And with regard to charging lands with money subscribed for the construction of railways, be it enacted as follows", and sections 78 to 89.
34 & 35 Vict. c. clviii	Thames Valley Drainage Act 1871	The whole act.
37 & 38 Vict. c. xxii	Thames Valley Drainage Act 1874	The whole act.
52 & 53 Vict. c. 30	Board of Agriculture Act 1889	In Schedule 1, in Part II, the entries relating to the General Land Drainage and Improvement Company's Act 1849, the Scottish Drainage and Improvement Company's Act 1856, the Land Loan and Enfranchisement Company's Act 1860, the Scottish Drainage and Improvement Company's Amendment Act 1860, the Thames Valley Drainage Act 1871 and the Thames Valley Drainage Act 1874.
Land Tax Enactments
1 & 2 Vict. c. 2	Civil List Act 1837	In section 14, the words "net and clear of all taxes or charges for or in respect of any land tax and".
8 & 9 Vict. c. 124	Leases Act 1845	In Schedule 2, in paragraph 2, in column II, the words "excepting land tax, and".
20 & 21 Vict. c. 31	Inclosure Act 1857	In section 10, the words "land tax".
56 & 57 Vict. c. 27	Land Tax Commissioners Names Act 1893	The whole act.
62 & 63 Vict. c. 25	Land Tax Commissioners' Names Act 1899	The whole act.
8 Edw. 7. c. 36	Small Holdings and Allotments Act 1908	In section 61(3), the words "land tax, or".
1 & 2 Geo. 6. c. 18	Land Tax Commissioners Act 1938	The whole act.
Superannuation Enactments
4 & 5 Will. 4. c. 24	Superannuation Act 1834	Sections 18, 22, 23, 25 and 26.
22 Vict. c. 26	Superannuation Act 1859	Sections 3, 11 and 15. In section 17, the words from "nor shall any person" to "such allowance". The Schedule.
50 & 51 Vict. c. 67	Superannuation Act 1887	Sections 6 and 10.
55 & 56 Vict. c. 40	Superannuation Act 1892	Sections 2 and 3. In section 4(1), the words from "and includes" to "1877" (where last occurring).
9 & 10 Geo. 5. c. 40	Retired Officers (Civil Employment) Act 1919	The whole act.
25 & 26 Geo. 5. c. 23	Superannuation Act 1935	Section 15.
12, 13 & 14 Geo. 6. c. 44	Superannuation Act 1949	Sections 37 and 50(2). In Schedule 2, in paragraph 7, the words "Subject to the provisions of the next following paragraph", and paragraph 8.
Miscellaneous Enactments
6 Anne c. 14 (I)	Billeting Act (Ireland) 1707	The whole act.
5 Geo. 3. c. 49	Bank Notes (Scotland) Act 1765	In section 1, the words "that from and after the fifteenth day of May one thousand seven hundred and sixty-six" and the words from "and that from and after" onwards. In section 3, the words "after the said fifteenth day of May one thousand seven hundred and sixty-six".
7 Geo. 3. c. 9	Justices Oaths Act 1766	The whole act.
7 Geo. 3. c. 48	Public Companies Act 1767	The whole act.
41 Geo. 3. (U.K.) c. 105	Witnesses on Petitions Act 1801	The whole act.
42 Geo. 3. c. 85	Criminal Jurisdiction Act 1802	Sections 2 to 6.
49 Geo. 3. c. 126	Sale of Offices Act 1809	In section 1, the words from "and also to all offices" to "East Indies".
3 & 4 Vict. c. 90	Infant Felons Act 1840	The whole act.
3 & 4 Vict. c. 111	Joint Stock Companies Act 1840	The whole act.
5 & 6 Vict. c. 79	Railway Passenger Duty Act 1842	Section 24.
11 & 12 Vict. c. 42	Indictable Offences Act 1848	Section 31.
14 & 15 Vict. c. 49	Preliminary Inquiries Act 1851	The whole act.
17 & 18 Vict. c. 94	Public Revenue and Consolidated Fund Charges Act 1854	Section 8. In Schedule (A), the words "10 & 11 Vict. cap. 47." and the words "Augmentation of stipends to Scotch clergy, under the Acts 50 Geo. 3 cap. 84; 4 Geo. 4 cap. 79; 5 Geo. 4 cap. 72 and cap. 90". In Schedule (B), the words "Salaries and contingencies of the General Register Office of Births, Deaths, and Marriages, Ireland ... 7 & 8 Vict. c. 81", the words "expenses in the Court of Chancery in Ireland under the Acts ... 11 & 12 Vict. c. 132" and the words "Pay, superannuations, and all other expenses of the constabulary police in Ireland ... 9 & 10 Vict. c. 97. 10 & 11 Vict. c. 100".
25 & 26 Vict. c. 69	Harbours Transfer Act 1862	Sections 3 and 4.
26 & 27 Vict. c. 33	Revenue Act 1863	Section 14.
29 & 30 Vict. c. 25	Exchequer Bills and Bonds Act 1866	Sections 24 and 25. In section 26, the words from "as well" to "this Act" (in the third place where they occur). In section 30, the words "made out and issued in pursuance of any former Act or Acts, or".
42 & 43 Vict. c. 44	Lord Clerk Register (Scotland) Act 1879	In section 9, the proviso.
43 & 44 Vict. c. 22	Merchant Shipping (Fees and Expenses) Act 1880	The whole act.
45 & 46 Vict. c. 49	Militia Act 1882	Section 54.
50 & 51 Vict. c. 16	National Debt and Local Loans Act 1887	Section 6(3). Sections 9 and 10.
51 & 52 Vict. c. 2	National Debt (Conversion) Act 1888	Part III. In section 32, the definitions of "the Bank" and "financial year".
54 & 55 Vict. c. 72	Coinage Act 1891	Section 1.
55 & 56 Vict. c. 48	Bank Act 1892	In section 5(1), the words "at the rate of two pounds fifteen shillings per cent. per annum, until the fifth day of April, one thousand nine hundred and three, and after that day," and the words from "Provided that" onwards.
55 & 56 Vict. c. 56	Coroners Act 1892	Section 1(8).
6 Edw. 7. c. 55	Public Trustee Act 1906	In section 7(2), the words "or the growing produce thereof."
7 Edw. 7. c. 4	Destructive Insects and Pests Act 1907	Section 1(2).
8 Edw. 7. c. 16	Finance Act 1908	Section 10(1).
10 Edw. 7 & 1 Geo. 5. c. 8	Finance (1909–10) Act 1910	Section 88(2). Section 93. In section 96(2), the words "or Part VII".
1 & 2 Geo. 5. c. 2	Revenue Act 1911	Section 18.
5 & 6 Geo. 5. c. 56	War Loan (Trustees) Act 1915	The whole act.
7 & 8 Geo. 5. c. 25	Courts (Emergency Powers) Act 1917	The whole act.
9 & 10 Geo. 5. c. 20	Scottish Board of Health Act 1919	In section 4(1), paragraph (f), in paragraph (g) the words "the Vaccination (Scotland) Acts 1863 to 1907", and paragraph (h).
9 & 10 Geo. 5. c. 50	Ministry of Transport Act 1919	In section 2(1), in the proviso, paragraph (iii). Sections 3, 6, 15 and 29. In section 30(2), the definition of "easement". In Schedule 2, in paragraph 1(1), the words "or any draft Order in Council under section 9 of this Act is submitted to Parliament" and the words "or Order in Council" in both places where they occur; in paragraph 1(3), the words "being in the case of a draft order a person" and the words from "and in the case" to "proposed works"; and in paragraph 1(4), the words "or submitting the draft Order in Council to Parliament" and the words "or submit the draft Order in Council to Parliament" in both places where they occur.
9 & 10 Geo. 5. c. 64	Courts (Emergency Powers) Act 1919	The whole act.
2 & 3 Geo. 6. c. 14	China (Currency Stabilisation) Act 1939	The whole act.
9 & 10 Geo. 6. c. 6	Chartered and Other Bodies (Resumption of Elections) Act 1945	The whole act.
11 & 12 Geo. 6. c. 29	National Assistance Act 1948	In Schedule 1, in paragraph 6, the words "or the growing produce thereof".
11 & 12 Geo. 6. c. 67	Gas Act 1948	In section 45(2), the words "or the growing produce thereof".
14 Geo. 6. c. 17	Agriculture (Miscellaneous Provisions) Act 1950	Sections 2 and 3.
14 & 15 Geo. 6. c. 8	European Payments Union (Financial Provisions) Act 1950	In section 3(5), the words "or the growing produce thereof".
14 & 15 Geo. 6. c. 14	Festival of Britain (Sunday Opening) Act 1951	The whole act.
14 & 15 Geo. 6. c. 39	Common Informers Act 1951	In the Schedule, the entries relating to the Acts 5 Edw. 3 c. 5 and 1 & 2 Jac. 1 c. 5 and to the Linen (Trade Marks) Act 1744 and the Lighting and Watching Act 1833.
14 & 15 Geo. 6. c. 53	Midwives Act 1951	In section 11, in paragraph (b) of the proviso to subsection (1), the words from "or exempt" to "nursing homes" and, in subsection (3), the words "one hundred and ninety-two and" and the words "two hundred and forty-six and".
15 & 16 Geo. 6 & 1 Eliz. 2. c. 13	Festival Pleasure Gardens Act 1952	So much of the Schedule as relates to the Festival of Britain (Sunday Opening) Act 1951.
15 & 16 Geo. 6 & 1 Eliz. 2. c. 62	Agriculture (Calf Subsidies) Act 1952	In section 1(3), the words from "either" to "fifty-one" and the words from "or, if" onwards.

== Subsequent developments ==
Section 2 of the act was repealed by section 41(1) of, and part I of schedule 6 to, the Northern Ireland Constitution Act 1973, which came into force on 18 July 1973.

The whole act was repealed by section 1 of, and part XI of the schedule to, the Statute Law (Repeals) Act 1974, which came into force on 27 June 1974.

The enactments which were repealed (whether for the whole or any part of the United Kingdom) by the act were repealed so far as they extended to the Isle of Man by section 1(1) of, and schedule 1 to, the Statute Law Revision (Isle of Man) Act 1991, which came into force on 25 July 1991.

== See also ==
- Statute Law Revision Act

== Bibliography ==
- Halsbury's Statutes
- John Burke (General editor). Current Law Statutes Annotated 1964. Sweet & Maxwell, Stevens & Sons. London. W Green & Son. Edinburgh. 1964.
- HL Deb vol 258, cols 379 to 381.
