= Pacific Islanders Protection Act =

Act of the Parliament of the United Kingdom

Pacific Islanders Protection Act 1872 (Note: The citation of this act by this short title was authorised by section 1 of the Pacific Islanders Protection Act 1875 (38 & 39 Vict. c. 51). The short title given by section 1 of the act itself, the "Kidnapping Act 1872", was repealed by section 11 of that act.)
- Act of Parliament
- Parliament of the United Kingdom
- Long title: An Act for the Prevention and Punishment of Criminal Outrages upon Natives of the Islands in the Pacific Ocean.
- Citation: 35 & 36 Vict. c. 19
- Territorial extent: United Kingdom

Dates
- Royal assent: 27 June 1872
- Commencement: On proclamation in each of the Australasian colonies (Note: Section 21.)
- Repealed: 31 July 1964
Other legislation
Amended by	Pacific Islanders Protection Act 1875
Repealed by	Statute Law Revision Act 1964

Status: Repealed

Text of statute as originally enacted

The Pacific Islanders Protection Act 1872 (35 & 36 Vict. c. 19), originally cited as the Kidnapping Act 1872, was an act of the Parliament of the United Kingdom that made provision for the prevention and punishment of criminal outrages by British subjects upon natives of the islands of the Pacific Ocean, in particular the blackbirding of Pacific Islanders as labourers. The act was made to protect the indigenous populations of the Pacific Islands from kidnapping and blackbirding (a practice involving the coercion and forced recruitment of Pacific Islanders for labour). Under this law, British ships were prohibited from kidnapping or coercing Pacific Islanders into recruitment.

== History ==
The act was first drafted as early as 1861, more than a decade before 1872. Later, on 27 June 1872, the Pacific Islanders Protection Act 1872 was finally passed and received royal assent. The act stated it did not override an act already passed by the Legislature of Queensland. The 1872 act, also known as the Kidnapping Act, included measures for preventing blackbirding, such as stricter licensing procedures and patrolling British-controlled islands. It was unlawful for British vessels to carry native labourers absent a licence granted by a governor of any of the Australasian colonies.

Section 3 of the 1872 act stated that British vessels cannot carry labourers from one island to another, even within the same group, unless the master has given a bond for £500. Later, the government proposes removing the £500 bond requirement by amending section 3 since the bond was expensive for small-scale British planters and settlers in the New Hebrides.

The law passed in 1872 was eventually expanded and amended with a new law in 1875. The two acts were intended to be read as a single body of law. On 2 August 1875, the Pacific Islanders Protection Act 1875 (38 & 39 Vict. c. 51) also received royal assent. This act gave the power to establish courts of justice and exercise jurisdiction over British subjects in the Pacific Islands. The Pacific Islanders Protection Acts of 1872 and 1875 were later repealed in Australia by schedule 2 of the Criminal Code Amendment (Slavery and Sexual Servitude) Act 1999 (No. 104) that was adopted on 24 August 1999.

== Subsequent developments ==
The 1872 act was construed as one with the Pacific Islanders Protection Act 1875 (38 & 39 Vict. c. 51), which received royal assent on 2 August 1875 and amended it. The 1875 act extended licences under sections 3 and 5 to the carrying of native labourers for the purposes of a fishery, industry or occupation connected with the vessel; extended the powers of seizure to goods and effects found on board; gave the High Court of Admiralty and every Vice-Admiralty Court in the Queen's dominions outside the United Kingdom jurisdiction over vessels, goods and effects seized under the act; and added the colony of Fiji to the definition of "Australasian colonies". It also empowered the Crown, by Order in Council, to exercise jurisdiction over British subjects in islands in the Pacific Ocean outside the Queen's dominions and to appoint a High Commissioner for those islands.

Sections 1, 18 and 21 of the 1872 act were repealed by section 11 of the 1875 act, without prejudice to anything done or any right or liability acquired under them.

The whole of the 1872 act was repealed by section 1 of, and the schedule to, the Statute Law Revision Act 1964, which came into force on 31 July 1964.

Schedules A and B to the 1875 act were repealed by section 1(1) of, and part VII of schedule 1 to, the Statute Law (Repeals) Act 1973, which came into force on 18 July 1973.

The whole of the 1875 act were repealed by section 1(1) of, and part IX of schedule 1 to, the Statute Law (Repeals) Act 1986, which came into force on 2 May 1986.
