= Destination Tables =

Destination Tables are published periodically by Halsbury's Statutes and are a guide to the consolidation of legislation passed by the Parliament of the United Kingdom since 1957. The volume contains details of every consolidation Act relating to England and Wales passed since 1983 as well as details of earlier important consolidations.

Recent years have seen the enactment of a series of Tax Law Rewrite Acts, which are not consolidation Acts in the strict sense but share many similar features. Examples of such Acts are the Income Tax (Earnings and Pensions) Act 2003, the Income Tax (Trading and Other Income) Act 2005, the Income Tax Act 2007, and the Corporation Tax Act 2009. The stated aim of these Acts is to “re-write the United Kingdom’s primary direct tax legislation to make it clearer and easier to use, without changing the law”, which in effect means consolidating various pieces existing tax legislation, sometimes with minor changes. To aid users of these Acts, official destination tables are published showing how the previous law has been rewritten in the new legislation and these tables are included in this volume.

In exceptional circumstances a government department will publish a destination table for an Act which is neither a consolidation Act nor a re-write Act. An example is the Companies Act 2006, which in effect re-wrote much of the Companies Act 1985 although it was not explicitly a re-write Act. Given the significance of this piece of legislation, the destination table for the 2006 Act has been included in this volume.

== Contents of current volume ==
The current volume is made up of two parts. Destination tables for individual consolidation/re-write Acts (which previously formed the bulk of the work) may be found in Part 2. These tables are for use where the consolidating enactment is known and the user wishes to see the previous legislation which made up the later enactment. Part 1 of the work contains a series of tables which form a consolidated table of destinations made up of all the individual consolidations contained in Part 2. These tables allow users to trace the destination of an enactment where only that repealed enactment is known.

Each destination table shows (in two or three columns according to the information available) the enactments repealed or revoked by the consolidation Act (or group of consolidation Acts) concerned and the provisions of the consolidating/re-write Act or Acts replacing those enactments. The tables also cover enactments which are not repealed or revoked (being required for other purposes) but, as happens frequently, are partly or wholly reproduced in a consolidation Act in order to effect a proper consolidation.

In a typical table, the enactments listed are divided into sections, subsections, paragraphs and sub-paragraphs to the extent that it is necessary to provide a sufficient and exact account of the destinations of the repealed provisions. In older tables, where a repealed section which was divided into subsections is replaced without rearrangement by a single section similarly divided, the relevant entries are simplified accordingly, and where consecutive subsections in one column correspond exactly to consecutive subsections in the other column they are grouped together whether the subsection numbering is the same or not. More recent tables have not been so simplified and reproduced at the level of detail shown in the official tables.

== Reviews ==
Glanville Williams said that the "Destination Table" was a "useful feature" of Halsbury.

== See also ==
- Halsbury's Statutes
- Is it in Force?
- Halsbury's Statutes Citator
