= The Laws of Australia =

Encyclopedia of the laws of Australia

The Laws of Australia is an encyclopaedia of the laws of Australia. Published by Lawbook Co. (Westlaw), it is one of the two foremost legal encyclopaedias in Australia, the other being Halsbury's Laws of Australia by LexisNexis.

The Laws of Australia, like other legal encyclopaedias, provides a summary on the current state of laws of Australia. Subjects are arranged systematically with case and statute law authorities which support legal propositions.
