= Public Companies Act 1767 =

Act of the Parliament of Great Britain

Public Companies Act 1767 (Note: The citation of this act by this short title was authorised by section 1 of, and the first schedule to, the Short Titles Act 1896. Due to the repeal of those provisions it is now authorised by section 19(2) of the Interpretation Act 1978.)
- Act of Parliament
- Parliament of Great Britain
- Long title: An Act for regulating the Proceedings of certain publick Companies and Corporations, carrying on Trade or Dealings with Joint Stocks, in respect to the declaring of Dividends; and for further regulating the Qualification of Members for voting in their respective General Courts.
- Citation: 7 Geo. 3. c. 48
- Territorial extent: Great Britain

Dates
- Royal assent: 29 June 1767
- Commencement: 1 August 1767 (Note: Section 1.)
- Repealed: 31 July 1964

Other legislation
- Amended by: Statute Law Revision Act 1887; Statute Law Revision Act 1888
- Repealed by: Statute Law Revision Act 1964

Status: Repealed

Text of statute as originally enacted

The Public Companies Act 1767 (7 Geo. 3. c. 48) was an act of the Parliament of Great Britain that prohibited shareholders voting in public companies, unless they had held shares for six months. It was intended to stop vote splitting, so as to retain greater equality among members of companies.

== Provisions ==
An Act for regulating the Proceedings of certain Public Companies and Corporations carrying on Trade or Dealings with Joint Stocks, in respect to the Declaring of Dividends; and for further regulating the Qualification of Members for voting in their respective General Courts.

Whereas by virtue of divers Acts of Parliament, and of Royal Charters founded thereupon, certain publick companies or corporations have been instituted for the purpose of carrying on particular trades or dealings with Joint Stocks; and the Management of the Affairs of such Companies has been vested in their General Courts, composed of the Members at large of such Companies respectively; in which General Courts every Member of each respective Company, possessed of such Share in the Stock of the Company as in and by the said Acts of Parliament and Charters is limited with regard to each of the said Companies respectively, is qualified and intitled to give a Vote or Votes: And wheras of late Years a most unfair and mischievous Practice has been introduced, of splitting large Quantities of Stock, and making separate and temporary conveyances of the parts thereof for the Purpose of multiplying or making occasional Votes immediately before the time of declaring a Dividend, of chusing Directors, or of deciding any other important Question; which practice is subversive of every Principle upon which the Establishment of such General Courts is founded, and if suffered to become general, would leave the permanent Interest of such companies liable at all times to be sacrificed to the partial and interested views of a few, and those perhaps temporary Proprietors: Be it therefore enacted...

... no member of any of the said Publick Companies or Corporations, instituted for the Purpose aforesaid, shall be deemed qualified to vote, or be admitted to give any Vote or Votes, in any General Court of any such Company, in respect of any Stock transferred to him, her or them... until he, she or they, shall have been possess of such Stock six Calendar Months; unless such Stock shall have been acquired or shall have come by Bequest or by Marriage, or by Succession to an Intestate’s Estate, or by the Custom of the City of London, or by any Deed of Settlement after the Death of any Person who shall have been intitled for Life to the Dividends of such Stock.

== Subsequent developments ==
The whole act was repealed by section 1 of, and the schedule to, the Statute Law Revision Act 1964, which came into force on 31 July 1964.

== See also ==
- UK company law
- History of UK company law
- Pender v Lushington
