= Halsbury's Laws of Canada =

Encyclopedia of Canadian Law

Halsbury's Laws of Canada is a comprehensive national encyclopedia of Canadian law, published by LexisNexis Canada, which includes federal, provincial and territorial coverage. It is the only Canadian legal encyclopedia covering all fourteen Canadian jurisdictions. Following an alphabetized title scheme, it covers 119 discrete legal subjects. Individual titles range from 50 to 1,300 pages.

Written by leading practitioners, jurists and academics, Halsbury’s Laws of Canada is an authoritative exposition of Canadian statutes, regulations and case law. It provides definitive information about black-letter law, without opinion or commentary, and without archival cases or outdated statutory references (except where necessary). Statutory material and case law are drawn together within a narrative text to provide a clear exposition of the current law of Canada.

Halsbury’s Laws of Canada is written in a clear and accessible style, suitable for users ranging from first-year law students to experienced counsel. Each subject title is, as far as possible at the time of publication, a complete statement of Canadian law on that topic as of the currency date specified at the beginning of the title.

The commentary is set out in numbered paragraphs (e.g. “HCR-x” for Criminal Offences and Defences), summarizing the applicable statutes and leading cases from every Canadian jurisdiction. Each numbered paragraph is followed by extensive footnotes. The footnotes provide full citations (and pinpoint references, where appropriate) to the authorities summarized in the commentary. They also contain any qualifications, exceptions, ancillary matters, and helpful comments on areas of uncertainty.

Each Halsbury’s Laws of Canada title is updated approximately every 18 months by way of a cumulative supplement, and thoroughly revised and reissued every four to five years. The main work and the supplements are available both in print and online.

== History ==
Halsbury’s Laws of Canada was first published in 2006. It is the Canadian equivalent of Halsbury’s Laws of England, which began publishing in 1907.

== Editions ==
The First Edition was completed in 2012. It originally consisted of 76 print volumes. Halsbury’s Laws of Canada currently comprises 72 print volumes and 119 discrete titles.

== Features ==
Halsbury’s Laws of Canada includes cross-references to numbered paragraphs, both within each title and between titles. Each title features various appendices, including glossaries consolidating key statutory definitions, indexes, and selected secondary sources. Additionally, each title provides comprehensive tables of cases, statutes, and statutory instruments, along with general, detailed, and sectional tables of contents, an ambit section, a statement of currency, a list of related titles, and references and abbreviations.

A Companion Guide and Consolidated Index, published separately, amalgamates all information from the individual title indexes in the main work. This makes it possible to locate where a particular subject is discussed without knowing which title it falls under and to find every reference to that subject within the main work.

== Authorship ==
Halsbury’s Laws of Canada provides authoritative expert commentary by many of Canada's leading legal subject matter experts. They include Associate Justice Linda S. Abrams, Peter A. Downard, Professor Bruce Feldthusen, the Hon. Stephen E. Firestone, the Hon. Stephen Goudge, Alan D. Gold, Ian Hull, the Rt. Hon. David Johnston, Professor Bruce MacDougall, the Hon. Graeme Mew, Lorne Waldman and Professor Janet Walker.

== Titles ==
The Halsbury’s Laws of Canada collection currently includes the following titles:

- Aboriginal
- Access to Information and Privacy
- Administrative Law
- Agriculture
- Alternative Dispute Resolution
- Athletics
- Aviation and Space
- Banking and Finance
- Bankruptcy and Insolvency
- Business Corporations
- Cemeteries and Interment
- Charities, Associations and Not-For-Profit Organizations
- Civil Procedure
- Commercial Law I: Agency / Auctions /Bailment / Betting, Gaming and Lotteries
- Commercial Law II: Bills of Exchange / Consumer Protection / Sale of Goods
- Communications
- Compensation and Rights of Crime Victims
- Competition and Foreign Investment
- Condominiums
- Conflict of Laws
- Constitutional Law – Charter of Rights
- Constitutional Law – Division of Powers
- Construction
- Contracts
- Controlled Drugs and Cannabis
- Copyright
- Criminal Offences and Defences
- Criminal Procedure
- Crown
- Customs and Excise
- Damages
- Debtor and Creditor
- Defamation
- Discrimination and Human Rights
- Education
- Elections
- Employment
- Environment
- Equitable Remedies
- Estoppel
- Evidence
- Expropriation
- Extradition and Mutual Legal Assistance
- Family
- Firearms, Weapons and Explosives
- Fires
- Food
- Forestry
- Gifts
- Guarantee and Indemnity
- Holidays
- Hospitality
- Hunting and Fishing
- Immigration and Citizenship
- Income Tax (Corporate)
- Income Tax (General)
- Income Tax (International)
- Infants and Children
- Inquests, Coroners and Medical Examiners
- Insurance
- Interim Preservation of Property Rights
- Judges and Courts
- Labour
- Landlord and Tenant
- Legal Profession
- Legislation
- Legislatures
- Limitation of Actions
- Liquor Control
- Maritime Law
- Media and Postal Communications
- Medicine and Health
- Mental Health
- Military
- Mines and Minerals
- Misrepresentation and Fraud
- Missing Persons and Absentees
- Mortgages
- Motor Vehicles
- Municipal
- Occupations and Trades
- Oil and Gas
- Partnerships
- Patents, Trade Secrets and Industrial Designs
- Penitentiaries, Jails and Prisoners
- Pensions
- Personal Property and Secured Transactions
- Planning and Zoning
- Police, Security and Emergencies
- Public Health
- Public Inquiries
- Public International Law
- Public Utilities
- Real Property
- Receivers and Other Court Officers
- Religious Institutions
- Restitution
- Roads, Highways and Bridges
- Securities
- Social Assistance
- Taxation (General)
- Taxation (Goods and Services)
- Technology and Internet
- Torts
- Trademarks, Passing Off and Unfair Competition
- Transportation (Carriage of Goods)
- Transportation (Railways)
- Trusts
- Vital Statistics
- Weights and Measures
- Wildlife, Livestock and Pets
- Wills and Estates
- Workplace Health and Safety
- Youth Justice

== Related publications ==
Halsbury’s Laws of Canada has counterparts in several common law jurisdictions, including Australia, England, Hong Kong, India, Malaysia, New Zealand and Singapore.

== Editors in chief ==
- David Keeshan: 2006 – 2011
- Jay Brecher: 2011 – 2016
- Shirley Margolis: 2016 – 2023
