= Stanley Shaw Bond =

British publisher (1877–1943)

Stanley Shaw Bond c.1930

Stanley Shaw Bond (8 July 1877 – 1943) was the owner of legal publishers Butterworth and Co, who "introduced professionalism into law publishing". He was the son of Charles Bond. He was responsible for the creation of Halsbury's Laws of England in 1907.
