= Halsbury's Statutory Instruments =

Compilation of British secondary legislation

Halsbury's Statutory Instruments is the standard work of authority on delegated legislation in England and Wales. It is one of the major legal works published by LexisNexis Butterworths (formerly Butterworths). Primarily used by legal practitioners and law students, it provides details of every statutory instrument of general application currently in force in England and Wales, either in full text of as an authoritative summary.

It is a companion work to both Halsbury's Statutes and Halsbury's Laws of England.

Publication of this work began in 1952.

== See also ==
- Halsbury's Laws of England
- Halsbury's Statutes
