= Stair Memorial Encyclopaedia =

Encyclopedia of law in Scotland

The Laws of Scotland: Stair Memorial Encyclopaedia
- Author: LexisNexis Butterworths (Publisher)
- Language: English
- Subject: Law
- Publisher: Butterworths LexisNexis
- Publication date: 1987 to current
- Publication place: United Kingdom

The Laws of Scotland: Stair Memorial Encyclopaedia (commonly referred to as the Stair Memorial Encyclopaedia) is an encyclopaedia of law in Scotland. It incorporates law derived from every source and, while concentrating on the specialities of Scots law, it also covers law common to the whole of the United Kingdom. Each statement of law is supported by citation of authority, and there are references to sources of further information, both primary and secondary. The Encyclopaedia may be cited with approval before the courts.

In 1981, three hundred years after James Dalrymple, 1st Viscount of Stair's first publication of his original work, a new encyclopaedia of Scots law was commissioned. The complete set consists of over 130 titles in 25 volumes and Reissue binders. It covers the whole spectrum of Scots law, from Administrative Law, through Criminal Law, Obligations and Property, to Wills and Succession. Stair Memorial Encyclopaedia is also available as a searchable electronic archive on a paid subscription basis.

== Editions ==
- The Laws of Scotland : Stair Memorial Encyclopaedia. Edinburgh : Butterworths, 1987-
