= Is it in Force? =

Is it in Force? is the authoritative guide to the commencement of UK statutes from Halsbury's Statutes, published daily as an online service and twice annually as a paperback volume by LexisNexis Butterworths. It deals with every Public Act of Parliament, Measure of the Welsh Assembly, Act of the Scottish Parliament and General Synod Measure passed since 1960. However, annual Finance Acts are not dealt with in Is it in Force? because the commencement of provisions therein are generally stated clearly in the text of the provision concerned.

Is it in Force? is designed to be used in conjunction with the Halsbury's Statutes Citator.

== See also ==
- Halsbury's Statutes
- Act of Parliament
