= Halsbury's Statutes =

Texts of UK legislation

Halsbury's Statutes of England and Wales (4th Edition)
- Author: Craig Rose (Publisher)
- Original title: The Complete Statutes Of England Classified And Annotated In Continuation Of Halsbury's Laws Of England and for ready reference entitled Halsbury's Statutes of England
- Language: English
- Subject: Law
- Publisher: LexisNexis Butterworths
- Publication date: 1985 to 1992
- Publication place: United Kingdom
- Preceded by: Halsbury's Statutes of England and Wales (3rd Edition)

Halsbury's Statutes of England and Wales (commonly referred to as Halsbury's Statutes) provides updated texts of every Public General Act of the Parliament of the United Kingdom, Measure of the Welsh Assembly, or Church of England Measure currently in force in England and Wales (and to various extents in Scotland and Northern Ireland), as well as a number of private and local Acts, with detailed annotations to each section and schedule of each Act. It incorporates the effects of new Acts of Parliament and secondary legislation into existing legislation to provide a consolidated "as amended" text of the current statute book.

Halsbury's Statutes was created in 1929. The full title of this work was The Complete Statutes of England Classified and Annotated in Continuation of Halsbury's Laws of England and for ready reference entitled Halsbury's Statutes of England. As indicated by the title, the new work was to be a companion to Halsbury's Laws of England and therefore bears the name of Lord Halsbury.

The first edition, in twenty volumes, appeared between 1929 and 1931. The new encyclopedia was based on the design of the earlier Butterworths' Twentieth Century Statutes (Annotated), a work in five volumes covering the Acts of 1900 to 1909, which had been kept up to date by annual supplemental volumes. Like its companion, Halsbury's Laws, it was arranged by subject matter. This new work, however, expanded on the previous statutory work in that it included all primary legislation in force at the time of publication.

The second edition in 33 volumes was published from 1948 to 1954.

The current edition (the fourth), in fifty volumes, was published between 1985 and 1992, and is supplemented by an annual hardbound supplement and periodic loose-leaf updates. It is published by LexisNexis Butterworths. Individual volumes are reissued when there has been a significant impact on the subject matter concerned through changes in legislation.

The complete set consists of the main volumes, the index, tables of statutes, secondary legislation and cases, the annual Cumulative Supplement and the quarterly looseleaf service. Halsbury's Statutes is also available as a searchable electronic archive on a paid subscription basis.

== See also ==
- Is it in Force? (published annually)
- Destination Tables (published periodically)
- Halsbury's Laws of England
- Halsbury's Statutory Instruments
- UK Statute Law Database
