= Halsbury's Laws of Australia =

Halsbury's Laws of Australia is similar to Halsbury's Laws of England, but is written for Australia. It is an encyclopaedia of the laws of Australia. Published by LexisNexis, it is one of the two foremost legal encyclopaedias in Australia, the other being The Laws of Australia - Encyclopedia by Lawbook Co.

Halsbury's Laws of Australia, like other legal encyclopaedias, provide a summary on the current state of laws of Australia. Subjects are arranged systematically by subject area and covering all nine jurisdictions, with case and statute law authorities which support legal propositions.
