= Chronological Table of the Statutes =

Act of Parliament of the United Kingdom

Chronological Table of and Index to the Statutes
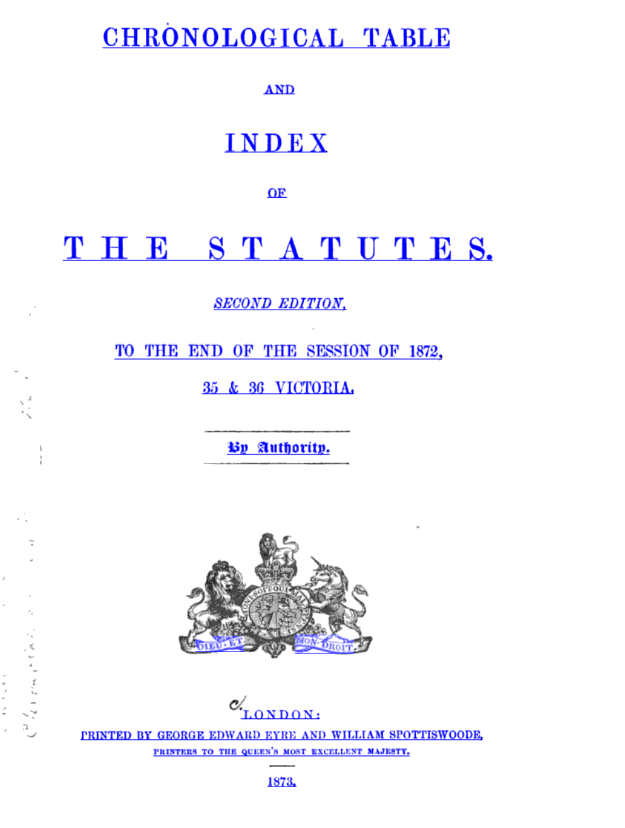
- Title page of the second edition (1873)
- Editor: Statute Law Committee
- Author: Statute Law Committee
- Language: English
- Genre: Law book
- Published: 1870 (first edition)
- Publication place: United Kingdom
- Text: Chronological Table of and Index to the Statutes at Wikisource

The Chronological Table of the Statutes is a chronological list of the public acts passed by the Parliament of England (1235–1706), the Parliament of Great Britain (1707–1800), and the Parliament of the United Kingdom (from 1801), as well as the acts of the old Parliament of Scotland (to 1707) and of the modern Scottish Parliament (from 1999), and the measures passed by the National Assembly for Wales (from 2008) and by the General Synod of the Church of England (from 1920). It is produced by Her Majesty's Stationery Office (now part of the Office of Public Sector Information) and published by The Stationery Office.

The Chronological Table was first published in 1870, and is issued regularly. As of 2023 the most recent edition takes the contents up to the end of 2022.

The Chronological Table does not list either personal or local acts, acts passed by the old Parliament of Ireland (to 1800), acts passed by the Parliament of Northern Ireland (1921–1972), measures passed by the short-lived Northern Ireland Assembly (1973–1974), nor acts passed by the modern Northern Ireland Assembly (from 1999).

The acts and measures (other than the acts of the old Parliament of Scotland) are arranged in order of their chapter number for each session (before 1963) or calendar year. For each act or measure the table states to what extent, and by what legislation, it has been amended or repealed.

== Background ==
In the United Kingdom, acts of Parliament remain in force until expressly repealed. Blackstone's Commentaries on the Laws of England, published in the late 18th-century, raised questions about the system and structure of the common law and the poor drafting and disorder of the existing statute book.

The Parliament of the United Kingdom, formed in 1800, following the Acts of Union 1800 devoted much attention to the consolidation of public records. In 1800, the Select Committee on the State of Public Records was appointed to inquire into the state of public records in England, Scotland and Ireland, resolving that it was "highly expedient for the honour of the nation and the benefit of all His Majesty's subjects that a complete and authoritative edition of all the statutes should be published".

In 1806, the Commission on Public Records passed a resolution requesting the production of a report on the best mode of reducing the volume of the statute book. From 1810 to 1825, The Statutes of the Realm was published, providing for the first time the authoritative collection of acts. In 1816, both Houses of Parliament, passed resolutions that an eminent lawyer with 20 clerks be commissioned to make a digest of the statutes, which was declared "very expedient to be done." However, this was never done.

At the start of the parliamentary session in 1853, Lord Cranworth announced his intention to the improvement of the statute law and in March 1853, appointed the Board for the Revision of the Statute Law to repeal expired statutes and continue consolidation, with a wider remit that included civil law. The Board issued three reports, recommending the creation of a permanent body for statute law reform.

In 1854, Lord Cranworth appointed the Royal Commission for Consolidating the Statute Law to consolidate existing statutes and enactments of English law. The Commission made four reports. Recommendations made by the Commission were implemented by the Repeal of Obsolete Statutes Act 1856 (19 & 20 Vict. c. 64).

On 17 February 1860, the Attorney General, Sir Richard Bethell told the House of Commons that he had engaged Sir Francis Reilly and A. J. Wood to expurgate the statute book of all acts which, though not expressly repealed, were not in force, working backwards from the present time. In 1861, the Statute Law Revision Act 1861 (24 & 25 Vict. c. 101) was passed, which repealed or amended over 800 statutes. In 1863, the Statute Law Revision Act 1863. (26 & 27 Vict. c. 125) was passed, which repealed or amended over 1,600 statutes for England and Wales. In 1867, the Statute Law Revision Act 1867 (30 & 31 Vict. c. 59) was passed, which repealed or amended over 1,380 statutes.

== Editions ==
The first edition of the Chronological Table of, and Index to the Statutes (Chronological Table of the Statutes) to the end of the session of 1869 was published in 1870, covering the period from the earliest period of the Parliament of England (1235) to the end of the fifth session of the 26th Parliament of the United Kingdom (62 & 63 Vict., 1899).

The table was published in two volumes for the first time in the thirteenth-edition in 1895. The table and index continued to be "arranged for combined use" until the end of 1950, since when they were published separately and no longer cover the same ground.

The table continued to be related to the third edition of the Statutes Revised until 1959, and now covers a wider range of acts than included in that publication, and its successors, Statutes in Force and the Statute Law Database.

Edition	Date	Description	Link
First Edition	1870	To the end of the session of 1869, 32 & 33 Victoria.	Internet Archive
Second Edition	1873	To the end of the session of 1872, 35 & 36 Victoria.	Google Books HathiTrust
Third Edition	1874	To the end of the session of 1874, 37 & 38 Victoria.	Google Books HathiTrust
Fourth Edition	1878	To the end of the session of 1877, 40 & 41 Victoria.	Google Books HathiTrust Internet Archive
Eleventh Edition	1890	To the end of the session of 1889, 52 & 53 Victoria.	Google Books
Thirteenth Edition	1896	To the end of the session of 1895, 59 Vict. Sess. 2.	Google Books HathiTrust
-	1951	Covering the legislation to 31 December 1950.	Google Books
-	1972	Covering the legislation to 31 December 1971.	Google Books

== See also ==
- Chronological Table of Private and Personal Acts
- Chronological Table of Local Legislation
