= Chronological Table of Local Legislation =

The Chronological Table of Local Legislation or the Chronological Table of Local Acts is a list of the 26,500 local acts passed by the Parliament of Great Britain and the Parliament of the United Kingdom since 1797.

It was produced by the Law Commission and the Scottish Law Commission who produced a report on it. The publication marked the first occasion on which a complete record of both public general and local legislation in force had been made available.

A writer in the Law Librarian said that the Chronological Table of Local Legislation was a "monumental work".

== Background ==
=== Local legislation ===
Originally, acts were published in two series, public acts and private acts. In 1979, public acts were divided into two further series, public general acts and public local and personal acts. Local legislation comprised the following classifications, developed in the 19th century:

1. Public Local and Personal Acts (1797–1802)
2. Local and Personal Acts to be judicially noticed (1802–1814)
3. Local and Personal Acts declared public and to be judicially noticed (1815–1867)
4. Local and Personal Acts (1868)
5. Local and Private Acts (1869)
6. Local Acts (1870–)
7. Provisional Order Confirmation Acts classified as Public Acts of a Legal Character (1868–1963)
8. Provisional Order Confirmation Acts (1964–1980)
9. Acts confirming Provisional Orders made under the Private Legislation Procedure (Scotland) Act 1899 (62 & 63 Vict. c. 47) which has been consolidated by the Private Legislation Procedure (Scotland) Act 1936 (26 Geo. 5 & 1 Edw. 8. c. 52) (1868–)

Local legislation was widely superseded in the late 19th and the 20th centuries by public general legislation.

From 1797, over 26,500 local acts were passed, covering a range of topics including docks, harbours and ports, transport, public utilities, local government and public health.

=== Previous attempts ===
In the 19th century, indexes to the local and personal and private acts were produced by Parliament. The Committee on the Library of the House of Commons recommended the production of a manuscript of an index, but the nearly completed index was destroyed in the Burning of Parliament in 1834. The index was ordered to be re-compiled in 1835. The 486 index of local and personal and private acts covering 1798–1839 was published in 1840, organised by topic, but did not include any repeals or amendments.

In 1840, a classified list of local and personal and private acts covering 1801–1844 was published on authority of the Select Committee on the Library of the House of Lords, divided into 19 classes. Three further indices were published, covering 1801–1801–1865, 1866–1877 and 1878–1887.

In 1870, the first edition of the Chronological Table of the Statutes was published as parts of the revised edition of the statutes, which indexed and tabulated all public general acts from 1235. At that time, the number of public general acts (18,600) outweighed the number of local acts (11,800). However, this was never done for local legislation and became increasingly important as the volume of local legislation outgrew public general legislation.

In 1900, a new index of local and personal and private acts was published under the direction of the Statute Law Committee covering 1801–1900. The index was based on the final three indices published on authority of the Select Committee on the Library of the House of Lords and was divided into 15 classes. Two further indices were published under the direction of the Statute Law Committee, the Index to the Local and Personal Acts 1801–1947 published in 1949 and the Supplemental Index to the Local and Personal Acts 1948–1966. The 1900 index included only repeals entered in earlier indices or apparent from the titles of particular acts. The 1949 index included those repeals and noted whole or substantial repeals made after 1900. The preface to the 1900 index noted:

"Like the previous volumes, this volume is, strictly speaking, not an Index, but merely a collection of classified lists. The various Acts are simply classified by reference to their titles, and no attempt has been made to examine the matter of each Act in detail, as work of that nature would involve a considerable staff and considerable time. In this respect this volume is essentially different from the Index to the Public Statutes.

...

No attempt has been made to enter repeals exhaustively, as it would be impossible to do so without examining the Acts in detail . . . in using the volume it must be remembered that the entries of repeals are quite incomplete."

== History ==
In 1974, the Statute Law Committee authorised the Statutory Publications Office, since approved by Advisory Committee on Statute Law, to create a table showing the effects of legislation passed on or after 1 January 1974 on earlier local, personal and private acts. That table was published as section 4 of the Chronological Table of the Statutes.

In the same year, the Law Commission and the Scottish Law Commission were authorised by the Committee to prepare a chronological table showing the effect of local, personal and private acts passed before the end of 1973.

Work on the chronological table of all the private act passed since the year 1539 began in 1974. The private acts from 1900 were listed in 1975, and the team were joined by a full-time librarian in October 1975.

All private acts were listed in 1976, and work transitioned to reading all acts, noting all repeals, amendments and expiries, which continued in 1977.

In 1978, the commission proposed publishing the work in stages, the first to cover approximately 50 years before 1974, which continued through 1979 and 1980 and was completed in 1981. The first draft consisted of over 1,000 pages of text, with the earliest act being passed in 1627.

In 1981, the first stage was split into two separate chronological tables, the first covering local acts from 1797 and the second covering private acts from 1539.

The first stage, covering the effects of legislation 1925–1973 was completed and approved in principle for publication as a work of general reference by the Statute Law Committee on 2 December 1983. This stage involved:

(a) the compilation of complete lists of the local, private and personal Acts passed at Westminster since 1539

(b) primary research, by the scanning of texts, into the effects of the local and personal legislation passed at Westminster during the research period 1925-1973 and into the effects on local and personal legislation of the public general Acts, Church Assembly or General Synod Measures and general statutory instruments and statutory rules and orders passed or made during that period

(c) the preparation of a text incorporating the information retrieved in two separate tables (covering the series of public local Acts and private Acts respectively) in a form which approximates to that used for the Chronological Table of the Statutes 1235-1981 (which covers the public general Acts).

The second stage, covering the effects of legislation passed since 1900, began in 1983.

Consultation on the first stage continued following a limited distribution to selected offices, libraries, public record offices and associations in 1985. The work on the second stage continued, logging the repeal or expiry of 2,500 acts passed during the 19th century and, as a result of consultation, work started on recording effects of local statutory instruments.

Consultation on the first stage concluded in 1986, which also confirmed the desire of consolidating the publication with section 4 of the Chronological Table of the Statutes. Work on the second stage continued, focusing on the effects of local statutory rules and orders from 1922–1973, there being no comprehensive collection of such rules and orders for 1890–1921.

In 1987, all local acts from 1890–1925 were examined with their effects recorded. The Commission confirmed their intention to publish an amalgamated text consisting of a complete list of all local acts passed since 1797, with a record of effects of all 20th century legislation and much 19th century legislation. By 1988, the text for local legislation from 1797–1850 was completed, with work for the remainder in progress.

In 1988, the scope of the second stage was expanded to 1850–1925. 3,600 local acts from 1865–1880 were examined with their effects recorded. Work for an amalgamated text for local legislation from 1797–1860 was completed.

In 1989, 2,900 acts from 1850–1864 were examined with their effects recorded. Work continued examining printed general and local statutory rules and orders from 1890–1925. Work for an amalgamated text for local legislation from 1797–1900 was completed, totalling 1,600 pages.

In 1990, the scope of the second stage was expanded to 1797 onwards. 2,800 local and private acts from 1835–1849 and all printed general and local statutory rules and orders from 1890–1925 were examined with their effects recorded. Work for an amalgated text for local legislation 1797–1930 was completed, totalling 2,300 pages.

In 1991, 6,350 local and private acts from 1797–1835 and the public general acts from 1797–1850 were examined with their effects recorded. Work for an amalgated text for local legislation from 1797–1965 was completed, totalling 2,650 pages.

In 1992, work on the second stage was completed. Work for an amalgated text for 1797–1973 was completed, totalling 2,680 pages. Preparation began for a final text for local legislation.

In 1993, the draft text for local legislation was completed, with decisions taken on the format and medium of the work in 1994, which totalled nearly 3,000 pages.

In 1994, the format of the text for local legislation was approved and final drafting proceeded with a view to publication in 1995 or 1996.

In 1995, the text for local legislation was finalised. This necessitated a refocus of work away from the text for private legislation, which would become the focus of the Law Commission following publication of the text for local legislation.

In July 1996, the table was published, spanning 2,681 pages across 4 volumes. In a launch marked by a reception at the House of Lords, James Mackay, Baron Mackay of Clashfern, Lord Chancellor stated:

"[The Chronological Table of Local Legislation] is a magnificent achievement on the part of the two Law Commissions and all those who have worked on it there. It will be immensely useful, indeed indispensable, not just to lawyers, but to all who have occasion to consult or advise on local Acts."

== Purpose ==
The immediate purpose of the table is to "provide an accessible and authoritative means for determining how far local legislation is in force". The Law Commission noted that the lack of an index led to a number of drafting issues, for example repeals made in general terms, wide statutory powers conferred on ministers to repeal, amend or modify local legislation and the formulation of legislation in a way such as to avoid the need to repeal and amend local legislation.

The longer-term purpose of the table is to "act as an essential aid for modernising and rationalising local legislation" with a view of assisting programmes of statute law revision for local legislation.

Following statute law revision, this would allow the publication of an index of the subject matter of local legislation which remain of practical utility alongside an authoritative edition of the texts of such local legislation. Combined with the table, this would assist legislators in drafting public general legislation which relates to local legislation.

== Subsequent developments ==
Large-scale repeals of local legislation were effected during the development of the table, including:

- Statute Law (Repeals) Act 1989
- Statute Law (Repeals) Act 1993
- Statute Law (Repeals) Act 1995

The Statute Law (Repeals) Act 1998 also contained local legislation relating to Hereford and Worcester, credited by the Law Commission as being possible following the publication of the table.

Work on the Chronological Table of Private Acts continued following the publication of the local table in 1996. The private table was published in 1999.

== See also ==
- Chronological Table of the Statutes
- Chronological Table of Private and Personal Acts
