= List of enacting clauses =

An enacting clause is a short phrase that introduces the main provisions of a law enacted by a legislature. It is also called enacting formula or enacting words. It usually declares the source from which the law claims to derive its authority.

In many countries, an enacting formula is not considered necessary and is simply omitted. In the United States a motion to "strike the enacting clause", if passed, rejects the bill.

The simplest enacting clauses merely cite the legislature by which the law has been adopted; for example the enacting clause used in Australia since 1990 is "The Parliament of Australia enacts".

== National legislatures ==
=== Albania ===
Parliament of Albania:

"THE PARLIAMENT OF ALBANIA DECIDED:"

=== Antigua and Barbuda ===
Parliament of Antigua and Barbuda:

"ENACTED by the Parliament of Antigua and Barbuda as follows:"

=== Argentina ===
Congress of Argentina:

"The Senate and House of Deputies of the Argentine Nation, in Congress assembled, ... enact or approve with the force of law:"

Spanish: "El Senado y Cámara de Diputados de la Nación Argentina, reunidos en Congreso,... decretan o sancionan con fuerza de ley."

=== Australia ===
==== Parliament of Australia ====
Period	Legislation	Constitutional amendments passed at a referendum
1990–present	The Parliament of Australia enacts:	The Parliament of Australia, with the approval of the electors, as required by the Constitution, enacts:
1973–1990	BE IT ENACTED by the Queen, and the Senate and the House of Representatives of the Commonwealth of Australia, as follows:	BE IT ENACTED by the Queen, and the Senate and House of Representatives of the Commonwealth of Australia, with the approval of the electors, as required by the Constitution, as follows:—
1901–1972	BE it enacted by the Queen's [King's] Most Excellent Majesty, the Senate, and the House of Representatives of the Commonwealth of Australia, as follows:—	BE it enacted by the Queen's [King's] Most Excellent Majesty, the Senate, and the House of Representatives of the Commonwealth of Australia, with the approval of the electors, as required by the Constitution, as follows:—

=== Austria ===
National Council:

"The National Council has enacted:"

German: "Der Nationalrat hat beschlossen:"

=== Bangladesh ===
Jatiya Sangsad:

"WHEREAS it is expedient and necessary to make provisions for the [purpose of the enactment] THEREFORE, it is hereby enacted as follows :"

=== Barbados ===
Parliament of Barbados:

1969:

"BE IT ENACTED by the Queen's Most Excellent Majesty, by and with the advice and consent of the Senate and House of Assembly of Barbados and by the authority of the same as follows:-"

2020:

"ENACTED by the Parliament of Barbados as follows:"

For bills amending the constitution:

"ENACTED by the Parliament of Barbados in accordance with section 49 of the Constitution as follows:"

=== The Bahamas ===
Parliament of The Bahamas:

"Enacted by the Parliament of The Bahamas."

=== Belgium ===
In Belgium the enacting formula appears in the Belgian official journal (Belgisch Staatsblad/Moniteur belge) when the law is promulgated and published, but is usually thereafter not included when the law is printed in compilations, or stored in internet databases, even official ones. The enacting clause is as follows.

N. (e.g. PHILIPPE), King of the Belgians: To all, present and to come, greeting. The Chambers have adopted and We sanction the following: (the articles of the law then follow. After the last article of the law the enacting formula continues). We promulgate the present law, order it to be sealed with the State Seal and published in the Moniteur belge/Belgisch Staatsblad

French: N. (PHILIPPE), Roi des Belges, A tous, présents et à venir, Salut. Les Chambres ont adopté et Nous sanctionnons ce qui suit (...) Promulguons la présente loi, ordonnons qu'elle soit revêtue du sceau de l'Etat et publiée par le Moniteur belge.

Dutch: N. (FILIP), Koning der Belgen, Aan allen die nu zijn en hierna wezen zullen, Onze Groet. De Kamers hebben aangenomen en Wij bekrachtigen hetgeen volgt (...) Kondigen deze wet af, bevelen dat zij met 's Lands zegel zal worden bekleed en door het Belgisch Staatsblad zal worden bekendgemaakt.

=== Belize ===
Parliament of Belize:

"BE IT ENACTED, by and with the advice and consent of the House of Representatives and the Senate of Belize and by the authority of the same, as follows:-"

=== Botswana ===
Parliament of Botswana:

"ENACTED by the Parliament of Botswana."

=== Brazil ===
National Congress of Brazil:

"THE PRESIDENT OF THE REPUBLIC: I make it known that the National Congress decrees and I sanction the following Law:"

Portuguese: "O PRESIDENTE DA REPÚBLICA: Faço saber que o Congresso Nacional decreta e eu sanciono a seguinte Lei:"'

In Brazil the presidential assent to a bill is called "sanction". After passing both houses of Congress (the Chamber of Deputies and the Federal Senate), the final version of the bill, duly signed by the presiding officers of both houses, is sent to the president of the republic. The document is still called a "proposed law", with a bill number, and with the header "The National Congress decrees:" (In Portuguese: "O Congresso Nacional decreta:"). If the president approves the bill, a different copy of the act is prepared by the Presidency of the Republic, with the official number of the law and the date of enactment of the law, and also with the replacement of the clause "The National Congress decrees:" with the above-mentioned formula "THE PRESIDENT OF THE REPUBLIC: I make it known that the National Congress decrees and I sanction the following Law:". The signatures of the presiding officers of Congress are therefore not present in this version of the act. This is the version of the statute that is published in the Official Journal and that is included in the statute books. When granting his approval to a bill, the president signs both the bill sent to him by Congress and the final version of the statute with the presidential enacting formula. The signed bill is returned to Congress by means of a presidential message; the signed statute with the presidential enacting formula is printed in the Official Journal, and the original is thereafter sent to the National Archive. Thus, in Brazil, the president is always seen signing two different documents at bill signing ceremonies (the two documents are called the "autographs"): one is the text of the proposed law; the other is the final text of the statute. Technically, the first signature (on the autograph of the bill sent by Congress) is the "sanction to the proposed law", that is, the approval of the bill, that transforms it in a law, and the second signature (on the final version of the statute with the presidential enacting formula and a law number) is the promulgation, the announcement to the people that the law has been adopted. While the signature of the president on the bill includes the addition of the formula "I sanction it" (in Portuguese: "Sanciono") above the signature, this is not seen in the final "promulgation" autograph of the statute. On the other hand, the promulgated statute contains not only the signature of the president but also the countersignatures of his ministers principally charged with applying the law.

When the president vetoes a bill, and the veto is overridden, the bill is returned by Congress to the president not for sanction (approval) but merely for promulgation. In that case, the president is expected to promulgate the bill in 48 hours. In that situation, the enacting formula that appears in the final text of the adopted statute is as follows:

"THE PRESIDENT OF THE REPUBLIC: I make it known that the National Congress maintained and I promulgate the following Law:"

Portuguese: "O PRESIDENTE DA REPÚBLICA: Faço saber que o Congresso Nacional manteve e eu promulgo a seguinte Lei:"

Tacit sanction (i.e. implicit approval) is deemed to take place if the president fails to sign or veto a bill within the constitutionally mandated timeframe of fifteen working days from receiving the bill. Once the bill is considered implicitly sanctioned, the president is expected to promulgate the new law and the same 48-hour timeframe applies. The formula in this case is:

"THE PRESIDENT OF THE REPUBLIC: I make it known that the National Congress decrees and I promulgate the following Law:"

Portuguese: "O PRESIDENTE DA REPÚBLICA: Faço saber que o Congresso Nacional decreta e eu promulgo a seguinte Lei:"

Should the president refuse to promulgate, or fail to promulgate in the period of 48 hours, a bill, after his veto has been overridden by Congress, then the authority to promulgate the bill passes to the president of the Senate. In that case, the formula of promulgation is:

"The President of the FEDERAL SENATE promulgates, in accordance with art. 66 §7, of the Federal Constitution, the following Law, that results from bill vetoed by the President of the Republic and maintained by the National Congress:"

Portuguese: "O Presidente do SENADO FEDERAL promulga, nos termos do art. 66, § 7, da Constituição Federal, a seguinte Lei, resultante de Projeto vetado pelo Presidente da República e mantido pelo Congresso Nacional:"

Should the president of the republic refuse to promulgate, or fail to promulgate in the period of 48 hours, a bill, after the bill has been implicitly sanctioned due to his failure to sign or veto it within the constitutionally mandated timeframe, then the authority to promulgate the bill passes to the president of the Senate. In that case, the formula of promulgation is:

"I make it known that the NATIONAL CONGRESS enacted, the President of the Republic, in accordance with the provisions of §3 of the art. 66 of the Constitution, sanctioned, and I, (NAME IN CAPITAL LETTERS), President of the Federal Senate, in accordance with the §7 of the same article, do promulgate the following Law:"

Portuguese: "Faço saber que o CONGRESSO NACIONAL aprovou, o Presidente da República, nos termos do § 3o do art. 66 da Constituição, sancionou, e eu, (NAME IN CAPITAL LETTERS), Presidente do Senado Federal, nos termos do § 7o do mesmo artigo promulgo a seguinte Lei:"

Whenever the president adopts a provisional measure and the provisional measure is approved by Congress with changes, a normal bill is sent to the president for approval or veto, and the same formulas used for other bills are employed; once enacted, the new statute replaces the provisional measure. However, if the provisional measure adopted by the president is approved by Congress without changes, the bill does not need to be presented for approval or veto; in that case, the law that both corresponds fully to the provisional measure and replaces it is promulgated directly by the president of the Senate, with the following words:

"I make it known that the President of the Republic adopted the Provisional Measure number NNN of YYYY, that the National Congress approved, and I, (NAME IN CAPITAL LETTERS), President of the Federal Senate, for the effects of the provision of the sole paragraph of art. 62 of the Federal Constitution, do promulgate the following Law:"

Portuguese: "Faço saber que o Presidente da República adotou a Medida Provisória no NN, de YYYY, que o Congresso Nacional aprovou e eu, (NAME IN CAPITAL LETTERS), Presidente do Senado Federal, para os efeitos do disposto no parágrafo único do art. 62 da Constituição Federal, promulgo a seguinte Lei:"

Historical: General Assembly of the Empire of Brazil (1822–1889)

Whenever the General Assembly of the Empire (made up of a Senate and of a Chamber of Deputies) passed a bill, a decree of the General Assembly containing the articles of the approved bill was sent to the emperor for sanction or veto. The decree of the General Assembly began with the following formula (that did not appear in the final version of the statute, after the imperial sanction): "The General Assembly decrees:" (in Portuguese: "A Assembleia Geral decreta:"). The decree was still only a proposed law, that would become an actual law if sanctioned by the emperor. The General Assembly sent its decree to the emperor for sanction or veto by means of a message with the words following: "The General Assembly sends to the Emperor the enclosed decree, that it considers advantageous, and useful to the Empire, and it asks that His Imperial Majesty may be pleased to grant it His sanction" (in Portuguese: "A Assembleia Geral dirige ao Imperador o decreto incluso, que julga vantajoso e útil ao Império, e pede a Sua Majestade Imperial, se digne dar a Sua sanção"). If the emperor decided to sanction the decree, then he sent the message of the General Assembly back to the legislature, adding after the text of the decree of the General Assembly the following words, together with the date and his signature: ""The Emperor consents" (in Portuguese: "O Imperador consente"). Then, the executive branch prepared a formal document to promulgate the new law, and this document was known in the imperial period as a Charter of Law (in Portuguese: Carta de Lei). It was the chartered version of the law that was included in the statute books and that was printed and published for the knowledge of the people. Thus, the Charter of Law was the final version of the statute as adopted. It was signed by the emperor and countersigned by his responsible ministers, and contained an enacting formula as follows:

NAME OF THE EMPEROR PRECEDED BY THE TITLE "DOM" (e.g. "DOM PETER THE SECOND"), by the grace of God and unanimous acclamation of the peoples, Constitutional Emperor and Perpetual Defender of Brazil: We make it known to all Our subjects that the General Assembly has decreed and We will the following law:

(the provisions of the Law then followed, and after the last article of the Law the text of the statute finished with a continuation of the enacting formula, as follows).

We command, therefore, all the authorities whom the knowledge and execution of this present Law may concern, that they comply with it and that they make it be complied with and kept, as faithfully and as fully as provided herein. The Secretary of State of the Affairs of... (title of the responsible Minister of the Crown who countersigns the Act with the Emperor and who heads the Department principally charged with applying the Law) is to make this Law be printed, published and circulated. Given at the Palace of... on (day) of (month) of (year), in the (year) of the Independence and of the Empire.

Portuguese: NAME OF THE EMPEROR PRECEDED BY THE TITLE "DOM" (e.g. "DOM PEDRO SEGUNDO"), por graça de Deus e unânime aclamação dos povos, Imperador Constitucional e Defensor Perpétuo do Brasil: Fazemos saber a todos os Nossos súditos que a Assembleia Geral decretou e Nós queremos a seguinte lei:

(the provisions of the Law then followed, and after the last article of the Law the text of the statute finished with a continuation of the enacting formula, as follows)

Portuguese: Mandamos, portanto, a todas as autoridades a quem o conhecimento e execução da referida lei pertencer, que a cumpram, e façam cumprir e guardar tão fiel e inteiramente como nela se contém. O Secretário de Estado dos Negócios... (title of the responsible Minister of the Crown who countersigns the Act with the Emperor and who heads the Department principally charged with applying the Law) a faça imprimir, publicar e correr. Dada no palácio... no (day) de (month) de (year), no (year) da Independência e do Império.

When the powers of the emperor were discharged by regents on behalf of the monarch the formula was as follows:

The Regency (or "The Regent"; or "The Princess Imperial Regent"), in the Name of His Majesty the Emperor, the Lord (name of the Emperor preceded by the title "Dom", e.g., "Dom Pedro II"), makes it known to all the subjects of the Empire that the General Assembly has decreed and it (or "He" or "She") sanctioned the following law:

(the provisions of the Law then followed, and after the last article of the Law the text of the statute finished with a continuation of the enacting formula, as follows).

(He, She, It) commands, therefore, all the authorities whom the knowledge and execution of this present Law may concern, that they comply with it and that they make it be complied with and kept, as faithfully and as fully as provided herein. The Secretary of State of the Affairs of... (title of the responsible Minister of the Crown who countersigns the Act with the Regent and who heads the Department principally charged with applying the Law) is to make this Law be printed, published and circulated. Given at the Palace of... on (day) of (month) of (year), in the (year) of the Independence and of the Empire.

Portuguese: A Regência (or "O Regente; or "A Princesa Imperial Regente), em Nome de Sua Majestade o Imperador, o Senhor (name of the Emperor preceded by the title "Dom", e.g., "Dom Pedro II"), faz saber a todos os súditos do Império que a Assembleia Geral decretou e ela (or ele) sancionou a seguinte lei:

(the provisions of the Law then followed, and after the last article of the Law the text of the statute finished with a continuation of the enacting formula, as follows)

Portuguese: Manda, portanto, a todas as autoridades a quem o conhecimento e execução da referida lei pertencer, que a cumpram, e façam cumprir e guardar tão fiel e inteiramente como nela se contém. O Secretário de Estado dos Negócios... (title of the responsible Minister of the Crown who countersigns the Act with the Regent and who heads the Department principally charged with applying the Law) a faça imprimir, publicar e correr. Dada no palácio... no (day) de (month) de (year), no (year) da Independência e do Império.

=== Canada ===
Parliament of Canada:

"His [Her] Majesty, by and with the advice and consent of the Senate and House of Commons of Canada, enacts as follows:"

French: "Sa Majesté, sur l'avis et avec le consentement du Sénat et de la Chambre des communes du Canada, édicte :"

The enacting clause for money bills differs. For example, in the Appropriation Act No. 4, 2015–16, it reads as follows:

MOST GRACIOUS SOVEREIGN,

Whereas it appears by message from His Excellency the Right Honourable (Governor General), Governor General and Commander-in-Chief of Canada, and the Estimates accompanying that message, that the sums mentioned below are required to defray certain expenses of the federal public administration, not otherwise provided for, for the financial year ending March 31, 2016, and for other purposes connected with the federal public administration;

May it therefore please Your Majesty, that it may be enacted, and be it enacted by the Queen's Most Excellent Majesty, by and with the advice and consent of the Senate and House of Commons of Canada, that:

French: TRÈS GRACIEUSE SOUVERAINE,
Attendu qu'il est nécessaire, comme l'indiquent le message de Son Excellence le très honorable David Johnston, gouverneur général et commandant en chef du Canada, et le budget des dépenses qui y est joint, d'allouer les crédits ci-dessous précisés pour couvrir certaines dépenses de l'administration publique fédérale faites au cours de l'exercice se terminant le 31 mars 2016 et auxquelles il n'est pas pourvu par ailleurs, ainsi qu'à d'autres fins d'administration publique,
Il est respectueusement demandé à Votre Majesté de bien vouloir édicter, sur l'avis et avec le consentement du Sénat et de la Chambre des communes du Canada, ce qui suit :

=== Chile ===
National Congress of Chile:

THE PRESIDENT OF THE REPUBLIC: "Bearing in mind that the Hon. National Congress has given its approval to the following Bill ... And because I have seen fit to approve and sanction it; therefore it enacted and take effect as a law of the Republic"

Spanish: EL PRESIDENTE DE LA REPÚBLICA: "Teniendo presente que el H. Congreso Nacional ha dado su aprobación al siguiente proyecto de ley ... Y por cuanto he tenido a bien aprobarlo y sancionarlo; por tanto promúlguese y llévese a efecto como Ley de la República."

=== Colombia ===
Congress of Colombia:

"The Congress of Colombia, Decrees:"

Spanish: "El Congreso de Colombia, Decreta"

=== Croatia ===
Hrvatski sabor:

Words "Hrvatski sabor" (Croatian Parliament) are printed in uppercase as a header on all laws, thereby starting the enacting clause and symbolizing that there is no authority higher than the Parliament. This might be rooted in a popular quote from Ante Starčević in a parliamentary discussion in June 1861, as he stated that there is no-one above the parliamentary sovereignty (other than God and the people of Croatia). A brief statement follows, signed by the president of Croatia, promulgating the law, referring to his constitutional right to do so and the session of the parliament where the legislation has been passed.

"CROATIAN PARLIAMENT
Based on the art. 89 of the Constitution of Croatia, I have decided as follows:
Decision to enact the law on... [name of the law]
I hereby proclaim the law on...[name of the law] passed by the Croatian Parliament at its nth session on [date]:"

Croatian: "HRVATSKI SABOR
Na temelju članka 89. Ustava Republike Hrvatske, donosim
Odluku o proglašenju Zakona o...[name of the law]
Proglašavam Zakon o...[name of the law], koji je Hrvatski sabor donio na sjednici [date]"

=== Denmark ===
The Danish Folketing:

"WE FREDERIK THE TENTH, by the Grace of God King of Denmark, hereby proclaim: The people's assembly has passed and We by Our consent have assented the following act:"

Danish: "VI FREDERIK DEN TIENDE, af Guds Nåde Danmarks Konge, gør vitterligt: Folketinget har vedtaget og Vi ved Vort samtykke stadfæstet følgende lov:"

=== Dominica ===
Parliament of Dominica:

"BE IT ENACTED by the Parliament of the Commonwealth of Dominica as follows:

=== Finland ===
Parliament of Finland (from 1917 onwards):

- Ordinary Acts (enacted in accordance with § 72 of the Constitution):

"In accordance with the decision of Parliament, it is enacted:"

Finnish: "Eduskunnan päätöksen mukaisesti säädetään:"

Swedish: "I enlighet med riksdagens beslut föreskrivs:"

- Acts containing a limited derogation from the Constitution (enacted in accordance with § 73 of the Constitution):

"In accordance with the decision of Parliament, made in accordance with § 73 of the Constitution, it is enacted:"

Finnish: "Eduskunnan päätöksen mukaisesti, joka on tehty perustuslain 73 §:ssä määrätyllä tavalla, säädetään:"

Swedish: "I enlighet med riksdagens beslut, tillkommit på det sätt som bestäms i 73 § i grundlagen, föreskrivs:"

- Acts concerning the Evangelical Lutheran Church of Finland:

"In accordance with the proposal of the General Synod and the decision of Parliament, the following Church Act for the Evangelical Lutheran Church of Finland is enacted:"

Finnish: "Kirkolliskokouksen ehdotuksen ja eduskunnan päätöksen mukaisesti säädetään Suomen evankelis-luterilaiselle kirkolle seuraava kirkkolaki:"

Swedish: "På förslag av kyrkomötet och enligt riksdagens beslut stiftas för Finlands evangelisk-lutherska kyrka följande kyrkolag:"

Before 1917 (examples):

"His Majesty the Emperor has, in accordance with the humble submission by the Estates of Finland, while in Petergof, on 7 (20) of July, 1906, been pleased to Graciously ratify the following Election Act for the Grand Duchy of Finland:"

— (1906)

Finnish: "Hänen Majesteettinsa Keisari on, Suomenmaan Valtiosäätyjen alamaisesta esityksestä, Pietarhovissa ollessaan 7 (20) p:nä heinäkuuta 1906 suvainnut Armossa vahvistaa seuraavan vaalilain Suomen Suuriruhtinaanmaalle::—"

"We Alexander the Third, by Grace of God the Emperor and Autocrat of all the Russias, Czar of Poland, Grand Duke of Finland, etc., etc., etc., make it known: it is our will to hereby promulgate, in accordance with the humble submission of the Estates of Finland, the following Criminal Code for the Grand Duchy of Finland, on execution of which, as well as on enforcement of punishments, a special decree will be given"

Finnish: "Me Aleksander Kolmas, Jumalan Armosta, koko Venäjänmaan Keisari ja Itsevaltias, Puolanmaan Zsaari, Suomen Suuriruhtinas, y. m., y. m., y. m. Teemme tiettäväksi: Suomenmaan Valtiosäätyjen alamaisesta esityksestä tahdomme Me täten armosta vahvistaa seuraavan rikoslain Suomen Suuriruhtinaanmaalle, jonka voimaanpanemisesta, niinkuin myöskin rangaistusten täytäntöönpanosta erityinen asetus annetaan:"

Swedish: "Wi Alexander den Tredje, med Guds Nåde, Kejsare och Sjelfherrskare öfver hela Ryssland, Tsar af Polen, Storfurste till Finland, etc., etc., etc., Göre veterligt: På Finlands ständers underdåniga framställning vele Wi härigenom i nåder stadfästa följande strafflag för Storfurstendömet Finland, om hvars införande, såsom ock angående verkställighet af straff, särskild förordning utfärdas:"

=== Fiji ===
Parliament of Fiji:

"ENACTED by the Parliament of the Republic of Fiji—"

=== France ===
Parliament of France:

"The National Assembly and the Senate have adopted,
The President of the Republic promulgates the law of which content follows:"

French: "L'Assemblée nationale et le Sénat ont adopté,
Le Président de la République promulgue la loi dont la teneur suit:"

=== Germany ===
Bundestag of Germany:

For acts which do not need the consent of the Bundesrat:

"The Bundestag has enacted the following law:"

German: "Der Bundestag hat das folgende Gesetz beschlossen:"

For acts which need the consent of the Bundesrat:

"With the consent of the Bundesrat, the Bundestag has enacted the following law:"

German: "Der Bundestag hat mit Zustimmung des Bundesrates das folgende Gesetz beschlossen:"

For acts which need an absolute majority and the consent of the Bundesrat:

"With the majority of its members and the consent of the Bundesrat, the Bundestag has enacted the following law:"

German: "Der Bundestag hat mit der Mehrheit seiner Mitglieder und mit Zustimmung des Bundesrates das folgende Gesetz beschlossen:"

For acts that change the Basic Law:

"With the consent of the Bundesrat, the Bundestag has enacted the following law; article 79 paragraph 2 of the Basic Law has been complied with:"

German: "Der Bundestag hat mit Zustimmung des Bundesrates das folgende Gesetz beschlossen; Artikel 79 Absatz 2 des Grundgesetzes ist eingehalten:"

All laws conclude with the following formula before the place and date of signature, the signature of the federal president and the countersignatures of the federal chancellor and of the federal ministers responsible for the subject-matter of the law:

"The above law is hereby promulgated and shall be published in the Federal Law Gazette"

German: "Das vostehende Gesetz wird hiermit ausgefertigt und wird in Bundesgesetzblatt verkundet"

=== Ghana ===
Parliament of Ghana:

"PASSED by Parliament and assented to by the President."

=== Greece ===
==== Normal lawmaking ====
According to the current Constitution of Greece (since March, 1986) each law is approved by the Parliament and promulgated by the president of the Republic.

"We, the President of the Hellenic Republic, do promulgate the following law approved by the Parliament:..."

Greek: "Ο ΠΡΟΕΔΡΟΣ ΤΗΣ ΕΛΛΗΝΙΚΗΣ ΔΗΜΟΚΡΑΤΙΑΣ Εκδίδομε τον ακόλουθο νόμο που ψήφισε η Βουλή:..."

Before the first amendment of the current Constitution of Greece (until March, 1986) each law had to be approved by the Parliament and then to be ratified and promulgated by the president of the republic.

"We, the President of the Hellenic Republic, do ratify and promulgate the following law approved by the Parliament:..."

Greek: "Ο ΠΡΟΕΔΡΟΣ ΤΗΣ ΕΛΛΗΝΙΚΗΣ ΔΗΜΟΚΡΑΤΙΑΣ Κυρώνουμε και εκδίδουμε τον ακόλουθο νόμο που ψήφισε η Βουλή:..."

Greek: "Ο ΠΡΟΕΔΡΟΣ ΤΗΣ ΕΛΛΗΝΙΚΗΣ ΔΗΜΟΚΡΑΤΙΑΣ Κυρούμεν και εκδίδομεν τον κατωτέρω υπό της Βουλής ψηφισθέντα νόμον:..."

Greek: "Ο ΠΡΟΕΔΡΟΣ ΤΗΣ ΕΛΛΗΝΙΚΗΣ ΔΗΜΟΚΡΑΤΙΑΣ Κυροῦμεν καὶ ἐκδίδομεν τὸν κατωτέρω ὑπὸ τῆς Βουλῆς ψηφισθέντα νόμον:..."

"We, the President of the Hellenic Republic, unanimously approved along with the Parliament, decided:..."

Greek: "Ο ΠΡΟΕΔΡΟΣ ΤΗΣ ΕΛΛΗΝΙΚΗΣ ΔΗΜΟΚΡΑΤΙΑΣ Ψηφισάμενοι ὁμοφώνως μετὰ τῆς Βουλῆς, ἀπεφασίσαμεν:..."

Under the presidential parliamentary constitution of 1927 and since the Senate's formation in June 1929, each law had to be approved by the Chamber of Deputies and the Senate and then to be promulgated by the president of the republic.

"We, Hellenic Republic, taking into account the article 75 of the Constitution, do promulgate the following Law, approved by the Chamber of Deputies and the Senate:..."

Greek: "ΕΛΛΗΝΙΚΗ ΔΗΜΟΚΡΑΤΙΑ Ἔχοντες ὑπ' ὄψει τὸ ἄρθρο 75 τοῦ Συντάγματος, ἐκδίδομεν τὸν επόμενο Νόμο, ψηφισθέντα ὑπὸ τῆς Βουλῆς καὶ τῆς Γερουσίας:..."

- While, until Senate's formation:

"We, Hellenic Republic, taking into account the article 75 of the Constitution, do promulgate the following Law, approved by the Parliament:..."

Greek: "ΕΛΛΗΝΙΚΗ ΔΗΜΟΚΡΑΤΙΑ Ἔχοντες ὑπ' ὄψει τὸ ἄρθρο 75 τοῦ Συντάγματος, ἐκδίδομεν τὸν επόμενο Νόμο, ψηφισθέντα ὑπὸ τῆς Βουλῆς:..."

"We, Hellenic Republic, unanimously approved along with the Parliament, decided and do decree the following:..."

Greek: "ΕΛΛΗΝΙΚΗ ΔΗΜΟΚΡΑΤΙΑ Ψηφισάμενοι ὁμοφώνως μετὰ τῆς Βουλῆς, ἀπεφασίσαμεν καὶ διατάσσομεν:..."

- And during the Fourth National Assembly at Athens held between January 1924 and September 1925:

"We, Hellenic Republic, unanimously approved along with the Fourth National Assembly at Athens, decided and do decree the following:..."

Greek: "ΕΛΛΗΝΙΚΗ ΔΗΜΟΚΡΑΤΙΑ Ψηφισάμενοι ὁμοφώνως μετὰ τῆς Δ' ἐν Ἀθήναις Συντακτικῆς Συνελεύσεως, ἀπεφασίσαμεν καὶ διατάσσομεν:..."

Also, during constitutional monarchy regime, under the constitutions of 1864 (as amended in 1911 and re-enacted in 1935) and 1952, each law had to be approved by both the Parliament and the king and then promulgated by the later.

"We, [Name] King of the Hellenes, unanimously approved along with the Parliament, decided and do decree:..."

Greek: "[Name] ΒΑΣΙΛΕΥΣ ΤΩΝ ΕΛΛΗΝΩΝ Ψηφισάμενοι ὁμοφώνως μετὰ τῆς Βουλῆς, ἀπεφασίσαμεν καὶ διατάσσομεν:..."

- Especially, under the constitution of 1844, each law had to be approved by the Chamber of Deputies, the Senate and the king and then promulgated by the last.

"We, Otto by Grace of God the King of the Greece, unanimously approved along with the Chamber of Deputies and the Senate, do decree the following:..."

Greek: "ΟΘΩΝ ΕΛΕΩι ΘΕΟΥ ΒΑΣΙΛΕΥΣ ΤΩΝ ΕΛΛΑΔΟΣ Ψηφισάμενοι ὁμοφώνως μετὰ τῆς Βουλῆς καὶ τῆς Γερουσίας, διατάττομεν ὡς ἐφεξής:..."

==== Lawmaking under the state of emergency ====
In case of extremely urgent unforeseen situations, the Constitution grants the Greek government along with the president of the republic to issue legislative acts bypassing the parliamentary approval, to deal with urgent issues, provided that act to be later submitted for sanction in Parliament within forty days after either its promulgation or the parliamentary session convocation, to acquire legal power.

"We, the President of the Hellenic Republic, taking into account: 1) the paragraph 1 of Constitution article 44. 2) The extremely urgent and unforeseen need [...], do decide:..."

Greek: "Ο ΠΡΟΕΔΡΟΣ ΤΗΣ ΕΛΛΗΝΙΚΗΣ ΔΗΜΟΚΡΑΤΙΑΣ Έχοντας υπόψη: 1) Την παράγραφο 1 του άρθρου 44 του Συντάγματος. 2) Την εξαιρετικά επείγουσα και απρόβλεπτη ανάγκη [...], αποφασίζουμε:..."

Under the previous presidential parliamentary constitutions, emergency laws and legislative decrees were enacted by the following clause:

"We, the President of the Hellenic Republic, on the proposal of Our Cabinet, decided and do decree:..."

Greek: "Ο ΠΡΟΕΔΡΟΣ ΤΗΣ ΕΛΛΗΝΙΚΗΣ ΔΗΜΟΚΡΑΤΙΑΣ Προτάσει τοῦ Ἠμετέρου Ὑπουργικοῦ Συμβουλίου, ἀπεφασίσαμεν καὶ διατάσσομεν:..."

- Especially, during Second Hellenic Republic period, emergency laws and legislative decrees were enacted by the following clause:

"We, Hellenic Republic, on the proposal of Our Cabinet, decided and do decree:..."

Greek: "ΕΛΛΗΝΙΚΗ ΔΗΜΟΚΡΑΤΙΑ Προτάσει τοῦ Ἠμετέρου Ὑπουργικοῦ Συμβουλίου, ἀπεφασίσαμεν καὶ διατάσσομεν:..."

During the Kingdom of Greece period, emergency laws and legislative decrees were enacted by the following clause:

"We, [Name] King of the Hellenes, on the proposal of Our Cabinet, decided and do decree:..."

Greek: "[Name] ΒΑΣΙΛΕΥΣ ΤΩΝ ΕΛΛΗΝΩΝ Προτάσει τοῦ Ἠμετέρου Ὑπουργικοῦ Συμβουλίου, ἀπεφασίσαμεν καὶ διατάσσομεν:..."

- Especially, under 1952 constitution, the legislative decrees were promulgated only during the absence of Parliament-in-session with consent of a special parliamentary committee, consisted of a fixed by law number of MPs appointed in advance at the start of each session.

"We, [Name] King of the Hellenes, taking into account the provisions of Constitution article 35 and the consent of the according to paragraph 2 of the same article 35 special parliamentary committee, provided in [Date], on the proposal of Our Cabinet, decided and do decree:..."

Greek: "[Name] ΒΑΣΙΛΕΥΣ ΤΩΝ ΕΛΛΗΝΩΝ Ἔχοντες ὑπ' ὄψει τὰς διατάξεις τοῦ ἄρθρου 35 τοῦ Συντάγματος καὶ τὴν ἀπὸ [Date] σύμφωνον γνώμην τῆς κατὰ τὴν παράγραφον 2 τοῦ αὐτοῦ ἄρθρου 35 Εἰδικῆς Ἐπιτροπῆς ἐκ Βουλευτῶν, προτάσει τοῦ Ἡμετέρου Ὑπουργικοῦ Συμβουλίου, ἀπεφασίσαμεν καὶ διατάσσομεν:..."

==== Constitutional and Parliament Regulation amendments ====
Currently, any amendment of the Constitution Law must be published in the official government gazette of the Hellenic Republic, directly ordered by the speaker of the Parliament.

"We, the Speaker of the Hellenic Parliament, taking into account: The second paragraph of the resolution provided in [date] by the [numbering] Revisionary Parliament of Hellenes, do order the whole text of the Constitution to be published on the official Government Gazette, including its modern Greek language reform introduced by the second resolution of the sixth Revising Assembly of Hellenes in March 6th, 1986 and the (following) amendments [...], as follows:..."

Greek: "Ο ΠΡΟΕΔΡΟΣ ΤΗΣ ΒΟΥΛΗΣ ΤΩΝ ΕΛΛΗΝΩΝ Έχοντας υπόψη: Τη Β' παράγραφο του Ψηφίσματος της [date] της [numbering] Αναθεωρητικής Βουλής των Ελλήνων, παραγγέλλουμε: να δημοσιευθεί στην Εφημερίδα της Κυβερνήσεως ολόκληρο το κείμενο του Συντάγματος, όπως μεταφέρθηκε στη δημοτική γλώσσα με το Β' Ψήφισμα της 6ης Μαρτίου 1986 της ΣΤ' Αναθεωρητικής Βουλής των Ελλήνων και όπως (έκτοτε) αναθεωρήθηκε [...], το οποίο έχει ως εξής:..."

Likewise, any amendment of the Work Regulation Law of the Hellenic Parliament must be published in the official government gazette of the Hellenic Republic, directly ordered by the speaker of the Parliament.

"We, the Speaker of the Parliament, taking into account: 1) the paragraph 1 of Constitution article 65. 2) [...], do order the Work Regulation of the Parliament to be published on the official Government Gazette, as follows:..."

Greek: "Ο ΠΡΟΕΔΡΟΣ ΤΗΣ ΒΟΥΛΗΣ Έχοντας υπόψη: 1) το άρθρο 65 παράγρ. 1 του Συντάγματος. 2) [...] . Παραγγέλουμε να δημοσιευθεί στην Εφημερίδα της Κυβερνήσεως ο Κανονισμός Εργασιών της Βουλής, που έχει ως εξής:..."

==== Presidential and royal decrees ====
The president of the Hellenic Republic is the sole authorized state official to promulgate decrees, according to the current constitution. In case of president's absence/incapacity/retirement, the decrees are legally promulgated by the president of the Parliament, performing as acting president of the republic.

"We, the President of the Hellenic Republic, taking into account: 1) the provisions [...]. The No [numbering/year] opinion of the Council of State, on the Minister of [portfolio] proposal, do decide:..."

Greek: "Ο ΠΡΟΕΔΡΟΣ ΤΗΣ ΕΛΛΗΝΙΚΗΣ ΔΗΜΟΚΡΑΤΙΑΣ Έχοντας υπόψη: 1) τις διατάξεις [...]. Την υπ' αρ. [numbering/year] γνωμοδότηση του Συμβουλίου της Επικρατείας, με πρόταση του Υπουργού [portfolio], αποφασίζουμε:..."

- Especially, during Second Hellenic Republic period:

"We, Hellenic Republic, taking into account: [...], on Our Minister of [portfolio] proposal, decided and do decree:..."

Greek: "ΕΛΛΗΝΙΚΗ ΔΗΜΟΚΡΑΤΙΑ Ἔχοντες ὑπ' ὄψει: [...], προτάσει τοῦ Ἡμετέρου ἐπὶ [portfolio] Ὑπουργοῦ, ἀπεφασίσαμεν καὶ διατάσσομεν:..."

During the Kingdom of Greece period, the clause of the equivalent royal decrees, issued only by the king or the authorized regent, was:

"We, [Name] King of the Hellenes, taking into account: 1) the provisions [...]. The No[numbering/year] opinion of the Council of State, on Our Minister of [portfolio] proposal, decided and do decree:..."

Greek: "[Name] ΒΑΣΙΛΕΥΣ ΤΩΝ ΕΛΛΗΝΩΝ Ἔχοντες ὑπ' ὄψει τὰς διατάξεις [...], τὴν ὑπ' ἀριθμ. [numbering/year] γνωμοδότησιν τοῦ Συμβουλίου τῆς Ἐπικρατείας, προτάσει τοῦ Ἡμετέρου ἐπὶ [portfolio] Ὑπουργοῦ, ἀπεφασίσαμεν καὶ διατάσσομεν:..."

==== Other acts ====
Acts issued by the Cabinet, being inferior than decrees, enact secondary legislation. Distinctively, various constituent acts (i.e. constitutional amendentments without parliamentary approval), occasionally issued for politically transitional periods (and sometimes be submitted for sanction by the next National Assembly, to be formal constitutional amendements), are also enacted like:

"The Cabinet, taking into account: [...], does decide:..."

Greek: "ΤΟ ΥΠΟΥΡΓΙΚΟ ΣΥΜΒΟΥΛΙΟ Έχοντας υπόψη: [...], αποφασίζει:..."

Greek: "ΤΟ ΥΠΟΥΡΓΙΚΟΝ ΣΥΜΒΟΥΛΙΟΝ Ἔχοντας ὑπ' ὄψει [...], ἀποφασίζει:..."

=== Grenada ===
Parliament of Grenada:

1967–1979, 1985–present:

"Be it enacted by the King's [Queen's] Most Excellent Majesty, by and with the advice and consent of the Senate and House of Representatives of Grenada, and by the authority of the same, as follows:—"

Governor-General and the Advisory Council of Grenada:

1983–1984:

"Enacted by the Governor-General with the advice and consent of the Advisory Council of Grenada:—"

People's Revolutionary Government:

1979–1983:

"In the exercise of the powers vested in the People's Revolutionary Government by People's Law No. 2 (Establishment of People's Revolutionary Government) and in exercise of the powers vested in the Prime Minister by People's Law No. 10 (Declaration and Effect of Laws) it is hereby ORDERED and PROCLAIMED as follows:

=== Guyana ===
Parliament of Guyana:

"Enacted by the Parliament of Guyana:—"

=== India ===
Parliament of India:

"BE it enacted by Parliament in the [number of years since 1950] Year of the Republic of India as follows:—"

=== Indonesia ===
Indonesian laws have a preamble stating the aims of the law and the clauses of the Constitution and clauses of other laws relevant to the law. The enacting clause is both before and after the preamble.

People's Representative Council:

BY THE GRACE OF GOD THE ALMIGHTY

THE PRESIDENT OF THE REPUBLIC OF INDONESIA,
considers that: [preamble]
taking into account: [clause of related laws]
By the Mutual Consent of the HOUSE OF REPRESENTATIVES OF THE REPUBLIC OF INDONESIA and the PRESIDENT OF THE REPUBLIC OF INDONESIA has DECIDED to:

Enact: [title of act]

Indonesian: DENGAN RAHMAT TUHAN YANG

MAHA ESA PRESIDEN REPUBLIK INDONESIA,
Menimbang: [preamble]
Mengingat: [clause of related laws]
Dengan Persetujuan Bersama DEWAN PERWAKILAN RAKYAT REPUBLIK INDONESIA dan PRESIDEN REPUBLIK INDONESIA MEMUTUSKAN: Menetapkan: [title of act]

Before constitutional amendments in 2000, the phrase after the preamble was as follows:

...

By the approval of the HOUSE OF REPRESENTATIVES OF THE REPUBLIC OF INDONESIA has DECIDED to:

Enacts:

Indonesian: ... Dengan Persetujuan DEWAN PERWAKILAN RAKYAT REPUBLIK INDONESIA MEMUTUSKAN: Menetapkan:

=== Ireland ===
The Oireachtas (parliament of the Republic of Ireland):

Standard:

Since 1937:

"Be it enacted by the Oireachtas as follows:—"

Irish: "Achtaitear ag an Oireachtas mar a leanas:—"

1922–1937:

"Be it enacted by the Oireachtas of Saorstát Éireann as follows:—"

Irish: "Achtuigheadh Oireachtas Shaorstáit Éireann mar leanas:—"

For an act with a preamble:

Since 1937:

"Be it therefore enacted by the Oireachtas as follows:—"

Irish: "Achtuigheadh an tOireachtas ar an ábhar san mar leanas:—"

1922–1937:

"Be it therefore enacted by the Oireachtas of Saorstát Éireann as follows:—"

Irish: "Achtuigheadh Oireachtas Shaorstáit Éireann ar an ábhar san mar leanas:—"

=== Israel ===
Currently, Israel does not use enacting clauses in its final laws, but a pseudo-enacting clause is usually printed at the beginning of bills:

Hebrew: "מתפרסמת בזה הצעת חוק מטעם ...........:—"

"A bill made by ........... is hereby published:—"

However, the Law and Administration Ordinance did have an enacting clause:

Hebrew: "בתוקף הסמכות שנקבעה למועצת המדינה הזמנית בהכרזה על הקמת מדינת ישראל מיום ה' באייר תש"ח (14 במאי 1948) ובמנשר מאותו יום, מחוקקת בזה מועצת המדינה הזמנית לאמור:—"

"By virtue of the authority granted to the Provisional State Council in the Declaration of Establishment of the State of Israel dated 14 May 1948, and the Proclamation dated the same day, the Provisional State Council hereby legislates as follows:—"

=== Italy ===
Italian laws are published in the Gazzetta Ufficiale (the official gazette) with the following enacting clauses:

Standard:

The Chamber of Deputies and the Senate of the Republic have approved; THE PRESIDENT OF THE REPUBLIC promulgates the following law

Italian: La Camera dei deputati ed il Senato della Repubblica hanno approvato; IL PRESIDENTE DELLA REPUBBLICA promulga la seguente legge:

Constitutional amendments passed by a two-thirds majority in each house:

The Chamber of Deputies and the Senate of the Republic, in the second vote with a two-thirds majority of the members of each Assembly, have approved; THE PRESIDENT OF THE REPUBLIC promulgates the following constitutional law

Italian: La Camera dei deputati ed il Senato della Repubblica, in seconda votazione e con la maggioranza dei due terzi dei componenti di ciascuna Assemblea, hanno approvato; IL PRESIDENTE DELLA REPUBBLICA promulga la seguente legge costituzionale:

Constitutional amendments passed by a majority of the entire membership in each house of Parliament and approved by referendum:

The Chamber of Deputies and in the Senate of the Republic have approved; The referendum called on [date on which the referendum was called] has yielded a favorable result; THE PRESIDENT OF THE REPUBLIC promulgates the following constitutional law

Italian: La Camera dei deputati ed il Senato della Repubblica hanno approvato; Il referendum indetto in data [date on which the referendum was called] ha dato risultato favorevole; IL PRESIDENTE DELLA REPUBBLICA promulga la seguente legge costituzionale:

.

Constitutional amendments passed by a majority of the entire membership in each house of Parliament and on which a referendum has not been requested:

The Chamber of Deputies and in the Senate of the Republic have approved, an absolute majority of their respective members voting in favor; No request for referendum has been presented; THE PRESIDENT OF THE REPUBLIC promulgates the following constitutional law:

Italian: La Camera dei deputati ed il Senato della Repubblica hanno approvato, con la maggioranza assoluta dei rispettivi componenti; Nessuna richiesta di referendum é stata presentata; IL PRESIDENTE DELLA REPUBBLICA promulga la seguente legge costituzionale:

After the text of the law itself, the enacting clause continues:

The present law, bearing the seal of the State, shall be inserted in the official collection of the normative acts of the Italian Republic. It is mandatory for everyone bound to observe it and to see that it is observed as a law of the State.

Italian: La presente legge, munita del sigillo dello Stato, sara' inserita nella Raccolta ufficiale degli atti normativi della Repubblica italiana. E' fatto obbligo a chiunque spetti di osservarla e di farla osservare come legge dello Stato.

After this concluding clause, the place and date of signature follow. Then the signature of the president of the republic (printed in capital letters when the law is published in the Gazette) and the counter-signatures of the president of the Council of Ministers (the prime minister) and of the keeper of the state seal (an office held by the minister of justice). Those counter-signatures are printed in normal letters when the law is published in the Gazette. The keeper of the state seal counter-signs the law when sealing it.

Thereafter, this enacting clause is usually omitted when the law is reprinted in internet compilations or legal books.

=== Jamaica ===
Parliament of Jamaica:

1962–2024:

"BE IT ENACTED by The King's [Queen's] Most Excellent Majesty, by and with the advice and consent of the Senate and House of Representatives of Jamaica, and by the authority of the same, as follows:-

Since 2024:

"BE IT ENACTED by the Parliament of Jamaica, by and with the advice and consent of the Senate and House of Representatives of Jamaica, and by the authority of the same, as follows:-

=== Kiribati ===
Maneaba ni Maungatabu:

"MADE by the Maneaba ni Maungatabu and assented to by the Beretitenti."

=== Lebanon ===
Parliament of Lebanon:

"The Chamber of deputies has adopted,
The President of the Republic enacts the law of which content follows:"

=== Malaysia ===
Parliament of Malaysia:

Since 1998:

"ENACTED by the Parliament of Malaysia as follows:"

Malay: "DIPERBUAT oleh Parlimen Malaysia seperti yang berikut:"

Before 1998:

"BE IT ENACTED by the Seri Paduka Baginda Yang di-Pertuan Agong with the advice and consent of the Dewan Negara and Dewan Rakyat in Parliament assembled, and by the authority of the same, as follows:–"

Malay: "MAKA INILAH DIPERBUAT UNDANG-UNDANG oleh Duli Yang Maha Mulia Seri Paduka Baginda Yang di-Pertuan Agong dengan nasihat dan persetujuan Dewan Negara dan Dewan Rakyat yang bersidang dalam Parlimen, dan dengan kuasa daripadanya, seperti berikut:–"

Special laws invoking Article 149 of the Constitution of Malaysia:

"(Preamble); NOW, THEREFORE, pursuant to Article 149 of the Federal Constitution, IT IS ENACTED by the Parliament of Malaysia as follows:"

Malay: "(Preamble); MAKA, OLEH YANG DEMIKIAN, menurut Perkara 149 Perlembagaan Persekutuan DIPERBUAT oleh Parlimen Malaysia seperti yang berikut:"

Special laws invoking Article 149 of the Constitution of Malaysia (Before 1998):

"(Preamble); Now, therefore, pursuant to Article 149 of the Constitution BE IT ENACTED by the Seri Paduka Baginda Yang di-Pertuan Agong with the advice and consent of the Dewan Negara and Dewan Rakyat in Parliament assembled, and by the authority of the same, as follows:"

Malay: "(Preamble); Maka, oleh yang demikian, menurut Perkara 149 Perlembagaan INILAH DIPERBUAT UNDANG-UNDANG oleh Seri Paduka Baginda Yang di-Pertuan Agong dengan nasihat dan persetujuan Dewan Negara dan Dewan Rakyat yang bersidang dalam Parlimen, dan dengan kuasa daripadanya, seperti yang berikut:"

=== Malta ===
Parliament of Malta:

Since 1974:

"BE IT ENACTED by the President, by and with the advice and consent of the House of Representatives, in this present Parliament assembled, and by the authority of the same, as follows:"

Maltese: "Il-PRESIDENT, bil-parir u bil-kunsens tal-Kamra tad-Deputati, imlaqqgħa f'dan il-Parlament, u bl-awtorità tal-istess, ħarġet b'liġi danli ġej:"

=== Mexico ===
After approving laws, Congress issues them as a decree in the manner stablished by Article 70 of the Constitution. Congress then sends the decree to the president for him to assent or veto the law. If the president grants assent to the law, he then issues a decree formally enacting it. Decrees are published in the Official Journal of the Federation (Diario Oficial de la Federación).

Congress of the Union:

"[Name of the President], President of the United Mexican States, to its inhabitants BE IT KNOWN: That the Honorable Congress of the Union has sent to me the following

DECREE

The Congress of the United Mexican States, decrees:"

Spanish:

"[Nombre del Presidente], Presidente de los Estados Unidos Mexicanos, a sus habitantes sabed: Que el Honorable Congreso de la Unión se ha servido dirigirme el siguiente

DECRETO

El Congreso de los Estados Unidos Mexicanos, decreta:"

=== Moldova ===
Parliament of the Republic of Moldova:

"The Parliament adopts the present law"

Romanian: "Parlamentul adoptă prezenta lege"

=== Namibia ===
Parliament of the Republic of Namibia:

"BE IT ENACTED as passed by the Parliament, and assented to by the President, of the Republic of Namibia as follows:"

=== Nauru ===
Parliament of Nauru:

"Enacted by the Parliament of Nauru as follows:"

=== Netherlands ===
Estates-General of the Netherlands:

"We [name of monarch], by the grace of God, [King/Queen] of the Netherlands, [Prince/Princess] of Orange-Nassau, etc. etc. etc.

To all who shall see this or hear it read, greetings! be it known:
Whereas We have considered that: [here follows a short recital of the Act's purpose];
Thus it is, that We, by the advice of the Council of State, and with the consent of the States General, have assented and understood as We hereby assent and understand:

[...text of law...]

[We] Require and command that these will be placed in the Official Bulletin of Acts and Decrees and that all ministries, authorities, governmental institutions and civil servants, whom it concerns, will diligently implement it.

Given at [location, be it in the Netherlands or abroad, and the date] [signed sovereign]"

The text in Dutch is:

"Wij [name of monarch], bij de gratie Gods, [Koning/Koningin] der Nederlanden, [Prins/Prinses] van Oranje-Nassau, enz. enz. enz.

Allen, die deze zullen zien of horen lezen, saluut! doen te weten:
Alzo Wij in overweging genomen hebben, [here follows a short recital of the Act's purpose];
Zo is het, dat Wij, de Raad van State gehoord, en met gemeen overleg der Staten-Generaal, hebben goedgevonden en verstaan, gelijk Wij goedvinden en verstaan bij deze:

[...text of law...]

Lasten en bevelen dat deze in het Staatsblad zal worden geplaatst en dat alle ministeries, autoriteiten, colleges en ambtenaren wie zulks aangaat, aan de nauwkeurige uitvoering de hand zullen houden.

Gegeven te [location and date] [signed sovereign]"

=== New Zealand ===
Parliament of New Zealand:

"The Parliament of New Zealand enacts as follows:-"

1986–1999:

"BE IT ENACTED by the Parliament of New Zealand as follows:-"

Before 1986:

"BE IT ENACTED by the General Assembly of New Zealand in Parliament assembled, and by the authority of the same, as follows:-"

=== Nigeria ===
Nigerian National Assembly:

"Enacted by the National Assembly of the Federal Republic of Nigeria-"

=== Pakistan ===
Parliament of Pakistan:

Whereas it is expedient to [purpose of the enactment] It is hereby enacted as follows:-

=== Papua New Guinea ===
National Parliament of Papua New Guinea

"Being an Act to [purpose of the enactment], MADE by the National Parliament ..."

=== Paraguay ===
Congress of Paraguay:

"The Congress of the Paraguayan Nation approve with the force of law:"

"El Congreso de la Nación Paraguaya saciona con fuerza de Ley."

"Be it known as law of the Republic, be it published and inserted in Official Register.- The President of the Republic.:"

Spanish: "Téngase por ley de la República, publíquese e insértese en el registro oficial.-El Presidente de la República."

=== Philippines ===
Congress of the Philippines

Bills:

"Be it enacted by the Senate and House of Representatives of the Philippines in Congress assembled:"

Filipino: "Dapat pagtibayin ng Senado at ng Kapulungan ng mga Kinatawan ng Pilipinas na ngayon ay nagpupulong:"

Spanish: "El Senado y la Cámara de Representantes de Filipinas constituídos en Congreso decretan:"

Joint resolutions:

"Resolved by the Senate and House of Representatives of the Philippines in Congress assembled:-"

=== Peru ===
Congress of Peru:

"The Congress of the Republic has given the following Law"

Spanish: "El Congreso de la Republica ha dado la Ley siguiente"

=== Portugal ===
The enacting clauses used in Portuguese legislation are determined by the Lei formulária (Formulary Law, Law no. 74/98).

President of the Republic

- General presidential decrees

"The President of the Republic decrees, in accordance with Article... of the Constitution, the following:"

Portuguese: O Presidente da República decreta, nos termos do artigo... da Constituição, o seguinte:

- Ratification of an international treaty

"The... (name and subject of the treaty, place and time of its signature and number and date of the parliamentary Resolution that approved it) is ratified."

Portuguese: "É ratificado o... (segue-se a identificação do tratado, com indicação da matéria a que respeita, do local e data da assinatura e do número e data da resolução da Assembleia da República que o aprovou para ratificação)."

Assembly of the Republic:

- Laws

"The Assembly of the Republic decrees, in accordance with paragraph... of Article 161 of the Constitution, as follows: "

Portuguese: A Assembleia da República decreta, nos termos da alínea... do artigo 161.º da Constituição, o seguinte:

- Resolutions

"The Assembly of the Republic decides, in accordance with paragraph... of Article 161 and subsection 5 of Article 166 of the Constitution, the following:"

Portuguese: A Assembleia da República resolve, nos termos da alínea... do artigo 161.º e do n.º 5 do artigo 166.º da Constituição, o seguinte:

Government

- Executive laws

"In accordance with... (subsection 2 OR paragraph a) of subsection 1) of Article 198 of the Constitution, the Government decrees the following:"

Portuguese: Nos termos... (do n.° 2 OU da alínea a) do n.º 1) do artigo 198.º da Constituição, o Governo decreta o seguinte:

OR

"Under legislative authorisation granted by Article... of Law no. ..., of... (date), and in accordance with paragraph b) of subsection 1 of Article 198 of the Constitution, the Government decrees the following"

Portuguese: No uso da autorização legislativa concedida pelo artigo... da Lei n.º ...., de... de..., e nos termos da alínea b) do n.º 1 do artigo 198.º da Constituição, o Governo decreta o seguinte:

OR

"To develop the legal framework enacted by Law (or Executive Law) no. ..., of... (date), and in accordance with paragraph c) of subsection 1 of Article 198 of the Constitution, the Government decrees the following:"

Portuguese: No desenvolvimento do regime jurídico estabelecido pela Lei (ou Decreto-Lei) n.º ...., de... de..., e nos termos da alínea c) do n.º 1 do artigo 198.º da Constituição, o Governo decreta o seguinte:

All laws conclude with the date of approval by the respective legislative body and the signature of its presiding member (either the president of the Assembly of the Republic or the prime minister), followed by the formula of promulgation by the president of the republic. This formula of promulgation is very simple, consisting only of the clause "Let it be published" (in Portuguese: Publique-se), followed by the date of promulgation by the president of the republic and the presidential signature (the name of the head of state is printed in capital letters when the law is published). After the signature of the president, the counter-signature of the prime minister follows (preceded by the date of the counter-signature), and the name of the prime minister is printed in normal letters when the law is published. No law can enter into force before being officially published in the Diário da República (Diary of the Republic).

=== Romania ===
Parliament of Romania:

"The Parliament of Romania adopts the present law"

Romanian: "Parlamentul României adoptă prezenta lege"

1965–1989:

"The Great National Assembly of the Romanian Socialist Republic adopts the present law"

Romanian: "Marea Adunare Naţională a Republicii Socialiste România adoptă prezenta lege"

1948–1965:

"The Great National Assembly of the Romanian People's Republic adopts"

Romanian: "Marea Adunare Naţională a Republicii Populare Române adoptă"

1881–1947:

"[King's name],
By the grace of God and the nation's will, King of Romania,
To all present and future, good health:
The legislative assemblies have voted and adopted, and We approve what follows:"

Romanian: "[King's name],
Prin graţia lui Dumnezeu şi voinţa naţională, Rege al Romaniei,
La toţi de faţă şi viitori, sănătate:
Adunările legiuitoare au votat şi adoptat, iar Noi, sancţionăm ce urmează:"

=== San Marino ===
Grand and General Council:

The enacting clause used in Sammarinese laws consists of two parts, the first is always the same when an enacting clause is used, and consists of the following:

We the Captains Regent of the Most Serene Republic of San Marino

Italian: Noi Capitani Reggenti la Serenissima Repubblica di San Marino

The clause refers to San Marino as "The Most Serene Republic"; however, this is not its official name.

The second part of the enacting clause comes at the end of the preamble, if any, and differs depending on the type of law in which it is contained and if certain actions may have been taken during its enactment (for example amendment during ratification).

Ordinary law:

Ordinary laws are published with the date of the sitting of the Grand and General Council on which the law was approved, so a law passed on 23 January 2019 would be worded as follows:

Hereby promulgate and order the publication of the following Ordinary Law, approved by the Great and General Council during its sitting of 23 January 2019

Italian: Promulghiamo e mandiamo a pubblicare la seguente legge ordinaria approvata dal Consiglio Grande e Generale nella seduta del 23 gennaio 2019

Constitutional law:

Like ordinary laws, constitutional laws are published with the date of the sitting of the Council at which it was approved, as well as the votes in favour and against its passage, so a constitutional law which was passed on 3 December 2021 with 43 votes in favour would have its enacting clause worded as follows:

Hereby promulgate and order the publication of the following Constitutional Law, approved by the Great and General Council during its sitting of 3 December 2021 with 43 votes in favour

Italian: Promulghiamo e mandiamo a pubblicare la seguente legge ordinaria approvata dal Consiglio Grande e Generale nella seduta del 23 gennaio 2019

Qualified law:

Qualified laws are worded similarly to constitutional laws:

Hereby promulgate and order the publication of the following Qualified Law, approved by the Great and General Council during its sitting of 31 October 2014 with 42 votes in favour and 2 votes against

Italian: Promulghiamo e mandiamo a pubblicare la seguente Legge Qualificata approvata dal Consiglio Grande e Generale nella seduta del 31 ottobre 2014 con 42 voti favorevoli, 2 voti contrari

Law of constitutional revision:

Hereby promulgate and order the publication of the following Law of Constitutional Revision, approved by the Great and General Council during its sitting of 14 December 2005

Italian: Promulghiamo e mandiamo a pubblicare la seguente legge di revisione costituzionale approvata dal Consiglio Grande e Generale nella seduta del 14 dicembre 2005

Decree:

Hereby decree, promulgate and order the publication of

Italian: Decretiamo, promulghiamo e mandiamo a pubblicare

On some occasions, the following line may appear as part of the preamble before the second part:

Availing Ourselves of our Faculties;

Italian: ValendoCi delle Nostre Facoltà;

Decree-law:

Hereby promulgate and order the publication of the following Decree-Law

Italian: Promulghiamo e mandiamo a pubblicare il seguente decreto-legge

Delegated decree:

Hereby promulgate and order the publication of the following Delegated Decree

Italian: Promulghiamo e mandiamo a pubblicare il seguente decreto delegato

Parliamentary decree:

Hereby promulgate and order the publication of

Italian: Promulghiamo e mandiamo a pubblicare

Regulation:

Hereby promulgate and order the publication of the following Regulation

Italian: Promulghiamo e mandiamo a pubblicare il seguente regolamento

Congress of State:

Like with legislation from the Grand and General Council, ordinances issued by the Congress of State consists of two parts which is usually separated by a preamble.

The Congress of State; hereby issues the following Ordinance

Italian: Il Congresso di Stato; emette la seguente Ordinanza

=== South Africa ===
Parliament of South Africa: Since 27 April 1994:

"BE IT [THEREFORE] ENACTED by the Parliament of the Republic of South Africa, as follows:—"

or

"PARLIAMENT of the Republic of South Africa [therefore] enacts as follows:—

The Constitution of South Africa, not being a conventional act of Parliament, does not contain an enacting formula per se. Its preamble does, however, contain the words

"We therefore, through our freely elected representatives, adopt this Constitution as the supreme law of the Republic".

In the context, "we" refers to the people of South Africa.

3 September 1984 to 27 April 1994:

For "general affairs" acts:

"BE IT [THEREFORE] ENACTED by the State President and the Parliament of the Republic of South Africa, as follows:—"

For "own affairs" acts:

"BE IT [THEREFORE] ENACTED by the State President and the House of [Assembly/Representatives/Delegates] of the Republic of South Africa, as follows:—"

1 January 1981 to 3 September 1984:

"BE IT [THEREFORE] ENACTED by the State President and the House of Assembly of the Republic of South Africa, as follows:―"

31 May 1961 to 1 January 1981:

"BE IT [THEREFORE] ENACTED by the State President, the Senate and the House of Assembly of the Republic of South Africa, as follows:―"

For acts amending the entrenched clauses of the Constitution of 1961:

"BE IT ENACTED by the State President, the Senate and the House of Assembly of the Republic of South Africa in accordance with the requirements of section 118 of the Republic of South Africa Constitution Act, 1961, as follows:―

31 May 1910 to 31 May 1961:

"BE IT [THEREFORE] ENACTED by the Queen's [King's] Most Excellent Majesty, the Senate and House of Assembly of the Parliament of the Union of South Africa, as follows:—"

For acts amending the entrenched clauses of the South Africa Act 1909:

"BE IT ENACTED by the Queen's [King's] Most Excellent Majesty, the Senate and the House of Assembly of the Union of South Africa, in accordance with the requirements of section one hundred and fifty-two of the South Africa Act, 1909, as follows:―"

=== Spain ===
Cortes Generales of Spain:

"[Name of the king/queen], [King/Queen] of Spain, to all whom these presents shall be seen or understood, BE IT KNOWN: That the Cortes Generales have approved and I do enact this Act as follows"

Spanish: "[Name of the king/queen], [Rey/Reina] de España, a todos los que la presente vieren y entendieren, sabed: Que las Cortes Generales han aprobado y Yo vengo en sancionar la siguiente Ley"

For constitutions:

"[Name of the king/queen], [King/Queen] of Spain, to all whom these presents shall be seen or understood, BE IT KNOWN: That the Cortes Generales have approved and the people of Spain have ratified the following Constitution"

Spanish: "[Name of the king/queen], [Rey/Reina] de España, a todos los que la presente vieren y entendieren, sabed: Que las Cortes Generales han aprobado y el pueblo español ratificado la siguiente Constitución"

For organic acts:

"[Name of the king/queen], [King/Queen] of Spain, to all whom these presents shall be seen or understood, BE IT KNOWN: That the Cortes Generales have approved and I do enact this Organic Act as follows"

Spanish: "[Name of the king/queen], [Rey/Reina] de España, a todos los que la presente vieren y entendieren, sabed: Que las Cortes Generales han aprobado y Yo vengo en sancionar la siguiente Ley Orgánica"

=== Saint Kitts and Nevis ===
Parliament of Saint Kitts and Nevis:

"BE IT ENACTED by the King's [Queen's] Most Excellent Majesty by and with the advice and consent of the National Assembly of Saint Christopher and Nevis, and by the authority of the same as follows:-"

=== Saint Lucia ===
Parliament of Saint Lucia:

1979–1988:

"BE IT ENACTED by the Queen's Most Excellent Majesty, by and with the advice and consent of the Parliament of Saint Lucia and by the authority of the same, as follows:"

Since 1988:

"BE IT ENACTED by the King's [Queen's] Most Excellent Majesty, by and with the advice and consent of the House of Assembly and the Senate of Saint Lucia, and by the authority of the same, as follows:"

=== Saint Vincent and the Grenadines ===
House of Assembly of Saint Vincent and the Grenadines:

"THE PARLIAMENT of Saint Vincent and the Grenadines enacts as follows:-"

=== Singapore ===
Parliament of Singapore:

"Be it enacted by the President with the advice and consent of the Parliament of Singapore, as follows:"

=== Solomon Islands ===
National Parliament of the Solomon Islands:

"ENACTED by the National Parliament of Solomon Islands."

=== Swaziland ===
Parliament of Swaziland

"ENACTED by the King and the Parliament of Swaziland."

=== Sweden ===
Riksdag

"The following is hereby prescribed."

Swedish: "Härigenom föreskrivs följande. "

=== Switzerland ===
Swiss Federal Assembly:

"The Federal Assembly of the Swiss Confederation, pursuant to the articles ... of the Federal Constitution, having taken notice of the message of the Federal Council of ..., resolves:"

German: "Die Bundesversammlung der Schweizerischen Eidgenossenschaft, gestützt auf die Artikel ... der Bundesverfassung, nach Einsicht in die Botschaft des Bundesrates vom ..., beschliesst:"

French: "L'Assemblée fédérale de la Confédération suisse, vu les art. ... de la Constitution, vu le message du Conseil fédéral du ..., arrête:"

Italian: "L'Assemblea federale della Confederazione Svizzera, visti gli articoli ... della Costituzione federale; visto il parere del Consiglio federale del ..., decreta:"

=== Trinidad and Tobago ===
Parliament of Trinidad and Tobago:

Since 1976:

"ENACTED by the Parliament of Trinidad and Tobago as follows:-"

1962–1976:

"BE IT ENACTED by the Queen's Most Excellent Majesty, by and with the advice and consent of the Senate and House of Representatives of Trinidad and Tobago, and by the authority of the same, as follows:-"

=== Thailand ===
National Assembly of Thailand:

Constitution:

"May there be virtue. Today is the [day] day of the [month] month of the year of the [year] under the lunar calendar, being [weekday], the [day] day of [month] under the solar calendar, in the [year] Year of the Buddhist Era.

[Name of the King in full title] is graciously pleased to proclaim that [here follows a recital of the background for the constitution's enactment]. [The submitting authority], therefore, submitted the draft charter to His Majesty to affix the royal signature to henceforth promulgate it as the Constitution of the Kingdom of Thailand. Having thoroughly considered by the King, the expedience to grant the royal permission [in accordance with the public opinion]. Be it, therefore, commanded by the King the enactment of this Constitution of the Kingdom of Thailand replaces the Constitution of the Kingdom of Thailand which enacted on [date of enactment of the previous Constitution] as of the date of its publication, henceforth onwards.

May the Thai People unite in observing, protecting and upholding this Constitution of the Kingdom of Thailand in order to maintain the democratic regime and the sovereignty of the Thai people, and bring about happiness, prosperity and dignity to His Majesty's subjects throughout the Kingdom according to the will of His Majesty in every respect."

Act:

"[Name of the King in brief title] is graciously pleased to proclaim that:

Whereas it is expedient to [have a/amend the/abrogate the] law on............

Be it, therefore, enacted by the King, by and with the advice and consent of the National Assembly, as follows:"

Royal decree and emergency decree:

"[Name of the King in brief title] is graciously pleased to proclaim that:

Whereas it is expedient to [have a/amend the/abrogate the] law on............

Be it, therefore, enacted by the King, by the virtue of.........., the Royal Decree/Emergency Decree as follows:"

Royal command:

"[Name of the King in brief title] is graciously pleased to proclaim that.............. Announced on the [day] Day of [month] BE [year], being the [regnal year] Year of the Present Reign."

=== Tuvalu ===
Parliament of Tuvalu:

"ENACTED by the Parliament of Tuvalu-"

=== Uganda ===
Parliament of Uganda:

"BE IT ENACTED by Parliament of as follows:"

=== United Kingdom ===
Parliament of the United Kingdom of Great Britain and Northern Ireland:

"BE IT ENACTED by the King's [Queen's] most Excellent Majesty, by and with the advice and consent of the Lords Spiritual and Temporal, and Commons, in this present Parliament assembled, and by the authority of the same, as follows:—"

For finance bills:

"Most Gracious Sovereign

WE, Your Majesty's most dutiful and loyal subjects, the Commons of the United Kingdom in Parliament assembled, towards raising the necessary supplies to defray Your Majesty's public expenses, and making an addition to the public revenue, have freely and voluntarily resolved to give and grant unto Your Majesty the several duties hereinafter mentioned; and do therefore most humbly beseech Your Majesty that it may be enacted, and be it enacted by the King's [Queen's] most Excellent Majesty, by and with the advice and consent of the Lords Spiritual and Temporal, and Commons, in this present Parliament assembled, and by the authority of the same, as follows:—"

For money bills:

"Whereas the Commons of the United Kingdom in Parliament assembled have resolved to authorise the use of resources and the issue of sums out of the Consolidated Fund towards making good the supply which they have granted to His [Her] Majesty in this Session of Parliament: — Be it therefore enacted by the King's [Queen's] most Excellent Majesty, by and with the advice and consent of the Lords Spiritual and Temporal, and Commons, in this present Parliament assembled, and by the authority of the same, as follows:—"

Under the Parliament Acts 1911 and 1949:

"BE IT ENACTED by The King's [Queen's] most Excellent Majesty, by and with the advice and consent of the Commons, in this present Parliament assembled, in accordance with the provisions of the Parliament Acts 1911 and 1949, and by the authority of the same, as follows:—"

An enacting clause may be preceded by an explanatory preamble of "whereas" clauses, e.g. for the Chequers Estate Act 1917.

Until the 19th century each later section of an act repeated an abbreviated version of the formula used in the first section, typically "and be it further enacted by the authority aforesaid". The first revised edition of the statutes omitted these formulae to save space, while printing the primary enacting clause. The Statute Law Revision Act 1888 deleted these formulae from many unrepealed acts.

=== United States ===
Congress of the United States

Bills:

"Be it enacted by the Senate and House of Representatives of the United States of America in Congress assembled,"

Joint Resolutions (have the same effect as bills):

"Resolved by the Senate and House of Representatives of the United States of America in Congress assembled,"

=== Vanuatu ===
Parliament of Vanuatu

"Be it enacted by the President and Parliament as follows"

=== Venezuela ===
National Assembly of Venezuela:

"The National Assembly of the Bolivarian Republic of Venezuela hereby Decrees"

=== Zambia ===
Parliament of Zambia:

"ENACTED by the Parliament of Zambia."

=== Zimbabwe ===
Parliament of Zimbabwe:

"ENACTED by the President and the Parliament of Zimbabwe."

=== Former legislatures ===
- Allied Control Council:

"The Control Council enacts as follows:"

- Congress of the Confederate States:

"The Congress of the Confederate States of America do enact,"

- Acts of the Governor General of India in Council:

"It is hereby enacted as follows:—"

- Parliament of Rhodesia:

1965–1969:

"BE IT ENACTED by His Excellency the Officer Administering the Government, as representative of the Queen's [King's] Most Excellent Majesty, by and with the advice and consent of the Parliament of Rhodesia, as follows:—"

- Legislature of the Government of the Ryukyu Islands:

"Be it enacted by the Legislature of the Government of the Ryukyu Islands:—"

Japanese: "琉球政府立法院はこゝに次の通り定める:"

== Territorial legislatures ==
=== Hong Kong ===
- Legislative Council of Hong Kong
  - Before 1997:
    - "BE it enacted by the Governor of Hongkong, with the advice of the Legislative Council thereof, as follows:-"
    - "BE it enacted by the Governor of Hong Kong, with the advice and consent of the Legislative Council thereof, as follows:-(Chinese: "茲由香港總督參照立法局意見並得該局同意後，制定本條例，各條文如下：—")
    - "Enacted by the Governor of Hong Kong, with the advice and consent of the Legislative Council thereof."(Chinese: "由香港總督參照立法局意見並得該局同意而制定。")
  - 1997–1998: "Enacted by the Provisional Legislative Council." (Chinese: "由臨時立法會制定。")
  - After 1998: "Enacted by the Legislative Council." (Chinese: "由立法會制定。")
  - After 1998 (with preamble): "NOW, THEREFORE, it is enacted by the Legislative Council as follows—" (Chinese: "現由立法會制定本條例如下 ——")

=== Macau ===
- Legislative Assembly of Macau:
  - Before 1999:
    - "The Legislative Assembly decrees, pursuant to the terms of article X of the Organic Statute of Macau, that the following shall be enforced as law:-"
    - Chinese: "立法會根據澳門憲章，第X條之規定，命令制訂在澳門地區具有法律效力條文如下："
    - Portuguese: "A Assembleia Legislativa decreta, nos termos do artigo X do Estatuto Orgânico de Macau, para valer como lei no território de Macau, o seguinte:"
  - After 1999:
    - "The Legislative Assembly decrees, pursuant to the terms of article 71, paragraph 1) of the Basic Law of the Macao Special Administrative Region, that the following shall be enforced as law:-"
    - Chinese: "立法會根據《澳門特別行政區基本法》第七十一條(一)項，制定本法律。"
    - Portuguese: "A Assembleia Legislativa decreta, nos termos da alínea 1) do artigo 71.º da Lei Básica da Região Administrativa Especial de Macau, para valer como lei, o seguinte: -"
- Chief Executive of Macau (Administrative regulations):
  - "The Chief Executive, after consulting the Executive Council, decrees, pursuant to the terms of article 50, paragraph 5) of the Basic Law of the Macao Special Administrative Region, enacts this independent/supplementary administrative regulation:-"
  - Chinese: "行政長官根據《澳門特別行政區基本法》第五十條（五）項，經徵詢行政會的意見，制定本獨立行政法規（或補充性行政法規）。"
  - Portuguese: "O Chefe do Executivo, depois de ouvido o Conselho Executivo, decreta, nos termos da alínea 5) do artigo 50.º da Lei Básica da Região Administrativa Especial de Macau, para valer como regulamento administrativo independente (ou regulamento administrativo complementar, conforme o caso), o seguinte:"
- Governor of Macau (Decree-laws):
  - "The Governor - decrees, under the terms of article X of the Organic Statute of Macau, to be valid as law in the territory of Macau, the following:"
  - Chinese: "總督根據澳門憲章，第X條之規定，命令制訂在澳門地區具有法律效力條文如下："
  - Portuguese: "O Governador - decreta, nos termos do artigo X do Estatuto Orgânico de Macau, para valer como lei no território de Macau, o seguinte:"

=== British crown dependencies ===
- Tynwald of the Isle of Man: "BE IT ENACTED by the King's [Queen's] Most Excellent Majesty, by and with the advice and consent of the Council and Keys in Tynwald assembled, and by the authority of the same, as follows:–"
- States of Jersey: "THE STATES, subject to the sanction of His [Her] Most Excellent Majesty in Council, have adopted the following Law –" (French: "LES ETATS, moyennant la sanction de Sa Très Excellente Majesté en Conseil, ont adopté la Loi suivante –")
- Bailiwick-wide laws: "THE STATES, in pursuance of their Resolution[s] of DATE, have approved the following provisions which, subject to the Sanction of His [Her] Most Excellent Majesty in Council, shall have force of law in the Bailiwick of Guernsey."
- States of Guernsey: "THE STATES, in pursuance of their Resolution[s] of DATE, have approved the following provisions which, subject to the Sanction of His [Her] Most Excellent Majesty in Council, shall have force of law in the Island[s] of Guernsey, [Alderney], [Herm and Jethou]."
- States of Alderney: "THE STATES OF ALDERNEY, in pursuance of their Resolution[s] of DATE, have approved the following provisions which, subject to the Sanction of His [Her] Most Excellent Majesty in Council, shall have force of law in the Island of Alderney."
- Chief Pleas of Sark: "THE CHIEF PLEAS OF SARK, in pursuance of their Resolution[s] of DATE, have approved the following provisions which, subject to the Sanction of His [Her] Most Excellent Majesty in Council, shall have force of law in Sark."

=== British overseas territories ===
- Anguilla House of Assembly: "ENACTED by the Legislature of Anguilla"
- Ascension Island Council: "Enacted by the Governor of Ascension after consultation with the Island Council of Ascension."
- Parliament of Bermuda: "Be it enacted by The King's [Queen's] Most Excellent Majesty, by and with the advice and consent of the Senate and the House of Assembly of Bermuda, and by the authority of the same, as follows:-"
- House of Assembly of the British Virgin Islands: "ENACTED by the Legislature of the Virgin Islands as follows:-"
- Legislative Assembly of the Cayman Islands: "ENACTED by the Legislature of the Cayman Islands."
- Legislative Assembly of the Falkland Islands: "ENACTED by the Legislature of the Falkland Islands ⎯"
- Gibraltar Parliament: "ENACTED by the Legislature of Gibraltar:-"
- Legislative Assembly of Montserrat: "Be it enacted by The King's [Queen's] Most Excellent Majesty, by and with the advice and consent of the Legislative Assembly of Montserrat, and by the authority of the same as follows:–".
- Pitcairn Island Council: "Enacted by the Governor of the Islands of Pitcairn, Henderson, Ducie and Oeno"
- Legislative Council of Saint Helena:"Enacted by the Governor of St Helena with the advice and consent of the Legislative Council of St Helena."
- Administrator of the Sovereign Base Areas of Akrotiri and Dhekelia: "BE it enacted by the Administrator of the Sovereign Base Areas of Akrotiri and Dhekelia as follows:-"
- Turks and Caicos Islands House of Assembly: "ENACTED by the Legislature of the Turks and Caicos Islands"

== Supranational legislatures ==
=== European Union ===
European Parliament:

THE EUROPEAN PARLIAMENT AND THE COUNCIL OF THE EUROPEAN UNION,

[If the power to make the enactment stems from the TEU: Having regard to the Treaty on European Union [and in particular Article/Articles … thereof],]

[If the power to make the enactment stems from the TFEU: Having regard to the Treaty on the Functioning of the European Union [and in particular Article/Articles … thereof],]

[If the power to make the enactment stems from the Euratom Treaty: Having regard to the Treaty establishing the European Atomic Energy Community [and in particular Article/Articles … thereof],]

[If the power to make the enactment stems from another primary act or international agreement: Having regard to [act or agreement in question],]

Having regard to the proposal from the European Commission,

After transmission of the draft legislative act to the national parliaments,

[If the bill was considered by European Economic and Social Committee: Having regard to the opinion of the European Economic and Social Committee,]

[If the bill was considered by Committee of the Regions: Having regard to the opinion of the Committee of the Regions,]

Acting in accordance with [the ordinary legislative procedure/the ordinary legislative procedure, in the light of the joint text approved by the Conciliation Committee on [date]/a special legislative procedure,],

Whereas:

[recital of the purpose of the enactment; if this recital contains multiple paragraphs, they are preceded by number points in brackets: (1), (2), (3), etc., and are referred to as "first recital", "second recital", "third recital", etc. in the text of the Act itself]

HAVE ADOPTED THIS [REGULATION/DIRECTIVE/DECISION]:

== Subnational legislatures ==
=== Australia ===
Parliament	Enacting clause
New South Wales	The Legislature of New South Wales enacts
Queensland	The Parliament of Queensland enacts
South Australia	The Parliament of South Australia enacts as follows:
Tasmania	Be it enacted by Her Excellency the Governor of Tasmania, by and with the advice and consent of the Legislative Council and House of Assembly, in Parliament assembled, as follows:
(Victoria (state)) Victoria	The Parliament of Victoria enacts:
Western Australia	The Parliament of Western Australia enacts as follows:
Australian Capital Territory	The Legislative Assembly for the Australian Capital Territory enacts as follows:
Norfolk Island Territory	BE IT ENACTED by the Legislative Assembly of Norfolk Island as follows—
Northern Territory	The Legislative Assembly of the Northern Territory enacts as follows:

=== Brazil ===
Parliament	Enacting clause
(Acre (state)) Acre	English: The GOVERNOR OF THE STATE OF ACRE; I MAKE IT KNOWN that the Legislative Assembly of the State of Acre decrees and I sanction the following Law: Brazilian Portuguese: A GOVERNADORA DO ESTADO DO ACRE; FAÇO SABER que a Assembleia Legislativa do Estado do Acre decreta e eu sanciono a seguinte Lei:
Alagoas	English: The GOVERNOR OF THE STATE OF ALAGOAS; Be it known that the State Legislative Power decrees and I sanction the following Law: Brazilian Portuguese: O GOVERNADOR DO ESTADO DE ALAGOAS; Faço saber que o Poder Legislativo Estadual decreta e eu sanciono a seguinte Lei:
Amapá	English: The GOVERNOR OF THE STATE OF AMAPÁ, I make it known that the Legislative Assembly of the State of Amapá approved and I, in accordance with art. 107 of the State Constitution, I sanction the following Law: Brazilian Portuguese: O GOVERNADOR DO ESTADO DO AMAPÁ, Faço saber que a Assembleia Legislativa do Estado do Amapá aprovou e eu, nos termos do art. 107 da Constituição Estadual, sanciono a seguinte Lei:
(Amazonas (Brazilian state)) Amazonas	English: I MAKE IT KNOW to all inhabitants that the LEGISLATIVE ASSEMBLY has decreed and I sanction the following LAW: Brazilian Portuguese: FAÇO SABER a todos os habitantes que a ASSEMBLEIA LEGISLATIVA decretou e eu sanciono a presente LEI:
Bahia	English: The GOVERNOR OF THE STATE OF BAHIA, I make it known that the Legislative Assembly decrees and I sanction the following Law: Brazilian Portuguese: O GOVERNADOR DO ESTADO DA BAHIA, faço saber que a Assembleia Legislativa decreta e eu sanciono a seguinte Lei:
Ceará	English: The GOVERNOR OF THE STATE OF CEARÁ; I make it known that the Legislative Assembly has decreed and I sanction and promulgate the following law: Brazilian Portuguese: O GOVERNADOR DO ESTADO DO CEARA; Faço saber que a Assembleia Legislativa decretou e eu sanciono e promulgo a seguinte lei:
Espírito Santo	English: The GOVERNOR OF THE STATE OF ESPÍRITO SANTO; I make it known that the Legislative Assembly has decreed and I sanction and promulgate the following law: Brazilian Portuguese: O GOVERNADOR DO ESTADO DO ESPÍRITO SANTO; Faço saber que a Assembleia Legislativa decretou e eu sanciono a seguinte Lei:
Goiás	English: The LEGISLATIVE ASSEMBLY OF THE STATE OF GOIÁS, pursuant to art. 10 of the State Constitution, decrees and I sanction the following Law: Brazilian Portuguese: A ASSEMBLEIA LEGISLATIVA DO ESTADO DE GOIÁS, nos termos do art. 10 da Constituição Estadual, decreta e eu sanciono a seguinte Lei:
Maranhão	English: THE GOVERNOR OF THE STATE OF MARANHÃO, I make it known to all its inhabitants that the Legislative Assembly of the State has decreed and I sanction the following Law: Brazilian Portuguese: O GOVERNADOR DO ESTADO DO MARANHÃO, Faço saber a todos os seus habitantes que a Assembleia Legislativa do Estado decretou e eu sanciono a seguinte Lei:
Maranhão	English: I, therefore, order all authorities responsible for the cognizance and execution of this Law to observe it and ensure its observance exactly as set forth therein. The Most Excellent Chief Secretary of the Civil House shall make it to be published, printed, and circulated. Brazilian Portuguese: Mando, portanto, a todas as autoridades a quem o conhecimento e a execução da presente Lei pertencerem que a cumpram e a façam cumprir tão inteiramente como nela se contém. A Excelentíssima Senhora Secretária-Chefe da Casa Civil a faça publicar, imprimir e correr.
Mato Grosso	English: The LEGISLATIVE ASSEMBLY OF THE STATE OF MATO GROSSO, in view of the provisions of art. 42 of the State Constitution, approves and the State Governor sanctions the following Law: Brazilian Portuguese: A ASSEMBLEIA LEGISLATIVA DO ESTADO DE MATO GROSSO, tendo em vista o que dispõe o art. 42 da Constituição Estadual, aprova e o Governador do Estado sanciona a seguinte Lei:
Mato Grosso do Sul	English: The GOVERNOR OF THE STATE OF MATO GROSSO DO SUL. I make it known that the Legislative Assembly has decreed and I sanction the following Law: Brazilian Portuguese: O GOVERNADOR DO ESTADO DE MATO GROSSO DO SUL. Faço saber que a Assembleia Legislativa decreta e eu sanciono a seguinte Lei:
Minas Gerais	English: The GOVERNOR OF THE STATE OF MINAS GERAIS, The People of the State of Minas Gerais, by their representatives, have decreed, and I, on their behalf, promulgate the following law: Brazilian Portuguese: O GOVERNADOR DO ESTADO DE MINAS GERAIS, O Povo do Estado de Minas Gerais, por seus representantes, decretou e eu, em seu nome, promulgo a seguinte lei:
Pará	English: The LEGISLATIVE ASSEMBLY OF THE STATE OF PARÁ enacts and I sanction the following Law: Brazilian Portuguese: A ASSEMBLEIA LEGISLATIVA DO ESTADO DO PARÁ estatui e eu sanciono a seguinte Lei:
Paraíba	English: The GOVERNOR OF THE STATE OF PARAÍBA, I make it known that the Legislative Power decrees and I sanction the following Law: Brazilian Portuguese: O GOVERNADOR DO ESTADO DA PARAÍBA, Faço saber que o Poder Legislativo decreta e eu sanciono a seguinte Lei:
(Paraná (state)) Paraná	English: The Legislative Assembly of the State of Paraná decreed and I sanction the following law: Brazilian Portuguese: A Assembleia Legislativa do Estado do Paraná decretou e eu sanciono a seguinte lei:
Pernambuco	English: THE GOVERNOR OF THE STATE OF PERNAMBUCO: I make it known that the Legislative Assembly has decreed and I sanction the following Law: Brazilian Portuguese: A GOVERNADORA DO ESTADO DE PERNAMBUCO: Faço saber que a Assembleia Legislativa decretou e eu sanciono a seguinte Lei:
Piauí	English: The GOVERNOR OF THE STATE OF PIAUÍ, I make it known that the Legislative Power decrees and I sanction the following Law: Brazilian Portuguese: O GOVERNADOR DO ESTADO DO PIAUÍ, Faço saber que o Poder Legislativo decreta e eu sanciono a seguinte Lei:
(Rio de Janeiro (state)) Rio de Janeiro	English: The Governor of the State of Rio de Janeiro, I make it known that the Legislative Assembly of the State of Rio de Janeiro decrees and I sanction the following Law: Brazilian Portuguese: O GOVERNADOR DO ESTADO DO RIO DE JANEIRO, Faço saber que a Assembleia Legislativa do Estado do Rio de Janeiro decreta e eu sanciono a seguinte Lei:
Rio Grande do Norte	English: The GOVERNOR OF THE STATE OF RIO GRANDE DO NORTE: I make it known that the Legislative Power decrees and I sanction the following Law: Brazilian Portuguese: A GOVERNADORA DO ESTADO DO RIO GRANDE DO NORTE: FAÇO SABER que o Poder Legislativo decreta e eu sanciono a seguinte Lei:
Rio Grande do Sul	English: The GOVERNOR OF THE STATE OF RIO GRANDE DO SUL. I make it known, in accordance with article 82, item IV, of the Constitution of the State, that the Legislative Assembly approved and I sanction and promulgate the following Law: Brazilian Portuguese: O GOVERNADOR DO ESTADO DO RIO GRANDE DO SUL. Faço saber, em cumprimento ao disposto no artigo 82, inciso IV, da Constituição do Estado, que a Assembleia Legislativa aprovou e eu sanciono e promulgo a Lei seguinte:
Rondônia	English: The GOVERNOR OF THE STATE OF RONDÔNIA: I make it known that the Legislative Assembly decrees and I sanction the following Law: Brazilian Portuguese: O GOVERNADOR DO ESTADO DE RONDÔNIA: Faço saber que a Assembleia Legislativa decreta e eu sanciono a seguinte Lei:
Roraima	English: The GOVERNOR OF THE STATE OF RORAIMA, I make it known that the Legislative Assembly approved and I sanction the following Law: Brazilian Portuguese: O GOVERNADOR DO ESTADO DE RORAIMA, Faço saber que a Assembleia Legislativa aprovou e eu sanciono a seguinte Lei:
(Santa Catarina (state)) Santa Catarina	English: The GOVERNOR OF THE STATE OF SANTA CATARINA; I make it known to all the inhabitants of this State that the Legislative Assembly decrees and I sanction the following Law: Brazilian Portuguese: O GOVERNADOR DO ESTADO DE SANTA CATARINA; Faço saber a todos os habitantes deste Estado que a Assembleia Legislativa decreta e eu sanciono a seguinte Lei:
(São Paulo (state)) São Paulo	English: The GOVERNOR OF THE STATE OF SÃO PAULO: I make it known that the Legislative Assembly decrees and I promulgate the following law: Brazilian Portuguese: O GOVERNADOR DO ESTADO DE SÃO PAULO: Faço saber que a Assembleia Legislativa decreta e eu promulgo a seguinte lei:
Sergipe	English: The GOVERNOR OF THE STATE OF SERGIPE, I make it known that the Legislative Assembly of the State approved and I sanction the following Law: Brazilian Portuguese: O GOVERNADOR DO ESTADO DE SERGIPE, Faço saber que a Assembleia Legislativa do Estado aprovou e eu sanciono a seguinte Lei:
Tocantins	English: The GOVERNOR OF THE STATE OF TOCANTINS; I make it known that the LEGISLATIVE ASSEMBLY OF THE STATE OF TOCANTINS decrees and I sanction the following Law: Brazilian Portuguese: O GOVERNADOR DO ESTADO DO TOCANTINS; Faço saber que a ASSEMBLEIA LEGISLATIVA DO ESTADO DO TOCANTINS decreta e eu sanciono a seguinte Lei:
(Federal District (Brazil)) Federal District	English: THE GOVERNOR OF THE FEDERAL DISTRICT, I MAKE IT KNOWN THAT THE LEGISLATIVE CHAMBER OF THE FEDERAL DISTRICT DECREES AND I SANCTION THE FOLLOWING LAW: Brazilian Portuguese: A GOVERNADORA DO DISTRITO FEDERAL, FAÇO SABER QUE A CÂMARA LEGISLATIVA DO DISTRITO FEDERAL DECRETA E EU SANCIONO A SEGUINTE LEI:

=== Canada ===
Parliament	Enacting clause
Alberta	HIS [HER] MAJESTY, by and with the advice and consent of the Legislative Assembly of Alberta, enacts as follows:
British Columbia	HIS [HER] MAJESTY, by and with the advice and consent of the Legislative Assembly of the Province of British Columbia, enacts as follows:
Manitoba	HIS [HER] MAJESTY, by and with the advice and consent of the Legislative Assembly of Manitoba, enacts as follows:
New Brunswick	English: HIS [HER] Majesty, by and with the advice and consent of the Legislative Assembly of New Brunswick, enacts as follows: French: Sa Majesté, sur l'avis et du consentement de l'Assemblée législative du Nouveau-Brunswick, décrète:
Newfoundland and Labrador	Be it enacted by the Lieutenant-Governor and House of Assembly in Legislative Session convened, as follows:
Northwest Territories	The Commissioner of the Northwest Territories, by and with the advice and consent of the Legislative Assembly, enacts as follows:
Nova Scotia	Be it enacted by the Governor and Assembly as follows:
Nunavut	The Commissioner of Nunavut, by and with the advice and consent of the Legislative Assembly, enacts as follows:
Ontario	HIS [HER] Majesty, by and with the advice and consent of the Legislative Assembly of the Province of Ontario, enacts as follows:
Prince Edward Island	BE IT ENACTED by the Lieutenant Governor and the Legislative Assembly of the Province of Prince Edward Island as follows:
Quebec	English: The Parliament of Québec enacts as follows: French: "Le Parlement du Québec décrète ce qui suit:
Saskatchewan	HIS [HER] MAJESTY, by and with the advice and consent of the Legislative Assembly of Saskatchewan, enacts as follows:
Yukon	The Commissioner of Yukon, by and with the advice and consent of the Legislative Assembly, enacts as follows:

=== Germany ===
- Landtag of Hesse: "The Landtag has enacted the following law:" (German: "Der Landtag hat das folgende Gesetz beschlossen:")
  All laws conclude with the following formula before the place and date of signature, the signature of the Minister-President and the countersignatures of the State Ministers responsible for the subject-matter of the law: "The above law is hereby promulgated. It shall be published in the Law and Ordinance Gazette for the State of Hesse." (German: "Das vorstehende Gesetz wird hiermit ausgefertigt. Es ist im Gesetz- und Verordnungsblatt für das Land Hessen zu verkünden.")

=== New Zealand ===
==== Provincial councils (abolished in 1876) ====
- Canterbury Provincial Council: "Be it enacted by the Superintendent of the Province of Canterbury, by and with the advice and consent of the Provincial Council thereof, as follows:—"

=== Philippines ===
==== Sangguniang Panlalawigan (Provincial Board) ====
- Aklan Provincial Board: "BE IT ENACTED by the Honorable Sangguniang Panlalawigan of Aklan that:"
- Bataan Provincial Board: "BE IT ENACTED by the Sangguniang Panlalawigan of Bataan;"
- Bohol Provincial Board: "Be it enacted by the Sangguniang Panlalawigan of the Province of Bohol in session duly assembled –"
  - Resolutions: "BE IT RESOLVED, as it is hereby resolved by the Sangguniang Panlalawigan of the Province of Bohol in session duly assembled –"
- Bukidnon Provincial Board: "BE IT ORDAINED by the Honorable Sangguniang Panlalawigan, Province of Bukidnon, this [day] of [month], in the Year of Our Lord, [year]:"
  - Alternative: "BE IT ORDAINED, by the Sangguniang Panlalawigan of Bukidnon, this [day] of [month], in the Year of Our Lord, [year], that:"
- Bulacan Provincial Board: "Be it enacted by the Sangguniang Panlalawigan in session assembled:"
- Cagayan Provincial Board: "NOW THEREFORE, be it resolved by this Body in session assembled to enact:"
- Camarines Norte Provincial Board: "BE IT ORDAINED by the Honorable Sangguniang Panlalawigan that:"
- Cavite Provincial Board: "Now therefore, be it enacted by the Sangguniang Panlalawigan in session assembled that:"
- Cebu Provincial Board: "The Sangguniang Panlalawigan of Cebu, hereby ORDAINS, that:"
- Davao de Oro Provincial Board (formerly Compostela Valley): "Be it ordained by the Sangguniang Panlalawigan, Compostela Valley Province, in Session Assembled that:"
- Cotabato Provincial Board: "Be it ordained by the Sangguniang Panlalawigan of Cotabato in a regular session assembled, THAT:"
- Eastern Samar Provincial Board: "Be it ordained by the Sangguniang Panlalawigan in its regular session duly assembled at the SP Session Hall, Legislative Building, Borongan, Eastern Samar on [date]."
- Ilocos Norte Provincial Board: "NOW, THEREFORE, Be it Ordained, that:"
- Iloilo Provincial Board: "BE IT RESOLVED, as it is hereby Resolved, by the Sangguniang Panlalawigan ng Iloilo to enact the following provincial ordinance:"
  - Alternative: "BE IT ORDAINED, as it is hereby Ordained, by the Sangguniang Panlalawigan in session assembled, that:"
- Isabela Provincial Board: "Be it ordained by the Sangguniang Panlalawigan of Isabela in its regular session duly assembled:"
- Leyte Provincial Board: "BE IT ORDAINED by the Sangguniang Panlalawigan in session assembled,"
- Marinduque Provincial Board: "Be it ordained by the [number] Sangguniang Panlalawigan of Marinduque in session assembled:"
- Misamis Occidental Provincial Board: "Be it ordained, by the Sangguniang Panlalawigan of Misamis Occidental in Session that:"
- Northern Samar Provincial Board: "BE IT ORDAINED by the Sangguniang Panlalawigan in session assembled:"
- Nueva Vizcaya Provincial Board: "Be it ordained by the Sangguniang Panlalawigan in session assembled that:"
- Pampanga Provincial Board: "BE IT ORDAINED BY THE SANGGUNIANG PANLALAWIGAN OF PAMPANGA, in session assembled:"
- Pangasinan Provincial Board: "Be it enacted by the Sangguniang Panlalawigan of Pangasinan in session assembled:"
  - Resolutions: "RESOLVED, by the Sangguniang Panlalawigan in session assembled"
- Rizal Provincial Board: "Be it enacted by the Sangguniang Panlalawigan ng Rizal in a session duly assembled that:"
  - Alternative: "Be it enacted by the Sangguniang Panlalawigan of Rizal in Session Assembled:"
- Samar Provincial Board: "RESOLVED, as it is hereby resolved, to enact the following:"
- South Cotabato Provincial Board: "Be it ordained by the Sangguniang Panlalawigan of South Cotabato that:"
- Southern Leyte Provincial Board: "Be it ordained by the Sangguniang Panlalawigan in session assembled."
- Zambales Provincial Board: "Now therefore, be it enacted, as it is hereby enacted, by the Sangguniang Panlalawigan of Zambales in a session herein assembled, by virtue of the powers vested in it by law, that:"
  - Alternative: "BE IT ORDAINED by the Sangguniang Panlalawigan of Zambales in session assembled that –"
- Zamboanga del Norte Provincial Board: "Be it ordained by the Sangguniang Panlalawigan of Zamboanga del Norte in session assembled"

==== Other legislatures ====
- Bangsamoro Parliament: "Be it enacted by the Bangsamoro Transition Authority Parliament in session assembled:"
  - Alternative: "Be it enacted by the Bangsamoro Transition Authority in Parliament assembled:"
  - Resolutions: "NOW, THEREFORE, be it RESOLVED, as it is hereby resolved in the Bangsamoro Transition Authority Parliament"
- Metro Manila Council: "NOW, THEREFORE, pursuant to Section 6(d) of RA 7924, this Regulation is hereby adopted and promulgated by the Metro Manila Council, that:"
  - Alternative: "NOW, THEREFORE, be it enacted by the Metro Manila Council, that:"
  - Ordinances: "NOW THEREFORE, be it ordained by the Metro Manila Council pursuant to Section 4 of Executive Order No. 392 that:"

==== Former legislatures ====
- Autonomous Region in Muslim Mindanao Regional Legislative Assembly: "Be it enacted by the Regional Assembly in session assembled."

=== Saint Kitts and Nevis ===
- Nevis Island Assembly:"BE IT ENACTED by the King's [Queen's] Most Excellent Majesty, by and with the advice and consent of the Nevis Island Assembly and by the authority of the same, as follows:–"

=== United Kingdom ===
==== Devolved institutions ====
- Northern Ireland Assembly: "BE IT ENACTED by being passed by the Northern Ireland Assembly and assented to by His [Her] Majesty as follows:"
- Scottish Parliament: Acts of the Scottish Parliament do not begin with a conventional enacting clause. Instead they begin with a phrase that reads: "The Bill for this Act of the Scottish Parliament was passed by the Parliament on [Date] and received Royal Assent on [Date]"
- Senedd (since 2020):

Acts in the English language: "Having been passed by Senedd Cymru and having received the assent of His [Her] Majesty, it is enacted as follows:-"
Acts in the Welsh language: "Gan ei fod wedi ei basio gan Senedd Cymru ac wedi derbyn cydsyniad Ei Fawrhydi [Ei Mawrhydi], deddfir fel a ganlyn:-"

- National Assembly for Wales (2006–2020):

Acts in the English language: "Having been passed by the National Assembly for Wales and having received the assent of Her Majesty, it is enacted as follows:—"
Acts in the Welsh language: "Gan ei fod wedi ei basio gan Gynulliad Cenedlaethol Cymru a chael cysyniad Ei Mawrhydi, deddfir fel a ganlyn:—"
Measures in the English language: "This Measure, passed by the National Assembly for Wales on [Date] and approved by Her Majesty in Council on [Date], enacts the following provisions:—"
Measures in the Welsh language: "Mae'r Mesur hwn, a basiwyd gan Gynulliad Cenedlaethol Cymru ar [Dyddiad] ac a gymeradwywyd gan Ei Mawrhydi yn Ei Chyngor ar [Dyddiad], yn deddfu'r darpariaethau a ganlyn:—"

===== Former legislatures =====
- Parliament of Northern Ireland (1921–1972): "BE it enacted by the Queen's [King's] most Excellent Majesty, and the Senate and the House of Commons of Northern Ireland in this present Parliament assembled, and by the authority of the same, as follows:-"

=== United States ===
==== State legislatures ====
- Alabama Legislature: "Be it enacted by the Legislature of Alabama"
- Alaska Legislature: "Be it enacted by the Legislature of the State of Alaska"
- Arizona State Legislature: "Be it enacted by the Legislature of the State of Arizona,"
- Arkansas General Assembly: "Be it enacted by the General Assembly of the State of Arkansas."
- California State Legislature: "The People of the State of California do enact as follows:"
- Colorado General Assembly: "Be it enacted by the General Assembly of the State of Colorado:"
  - For bills adopted by referendum, "Be it enacted by the People of the State of Colorado:"
- Connecticut General Assembly: "Be it enacted by the Senate and House of Representatives in General Assembly convened:"
- Delaware General Assembly: "Be it enacted by the General Assembly of the State of Delaware"
- Florida Legislature: "Be It enacted by the Legislature of the State of Florida:"
- Georgia General Assembly: "Be it enacted by the General Assembly of Georgia"
- Hawaii State Legislature: "Be it enacted by the Legislature of the State of Hawaii:"
- Idaho Legislature: "Be it enacted by the Legislature of the State of Idaho"
- Illinois General Assembly: "Be it enacted by the People of the State of Illinois, represented in the General Assembly"
- Indiana General Assembly: "Be it enacted by the General Assembly of the State of Indiana"
- Iowa General Assembly: "Be it enacted by the General Assembly of the State of Iowa"
- Kansas Legislature: "Be it enacted by the Legislature of the State of Kansas"
- Kentucky General Assembly: "Be it enacted by the General Assembly of the Commonwealth of Kentucky"
- Louisiana Legislature: "Be it enacted by the Legislature of Louisiana."
- Maine Legislature: "Be it enacted by the People of the State of Maine as follows:"
- Maryland General Assembly: "Be it enacted by the General Assembly of Maryland"
- Massachusetts General Court: "Be it enacted by the Senate and House of Representatives in General Court assembled, and by the authority of the same, as follows:"
- Michigan Legislature: "The People of the State of Michigan enact:"
- Minnesota Legislature: "Be it enacted by the Legislature of the State of Minnesota"
- Mississippi Legislature: "Be it enacted by the Legislature of the state of Mississippi"
- Missouri General Assembly: "Be it enacted by the General Assembly of the State of Missouri, as follows"
- Montana Legislature: "Be it enacted by the Legislature of the State of Montana"
- Nebraska Legislature: "Be it enacted by the people of the State of Nebraska"
- Nevada Legislature: "The People of the State of Nevada, represented in Senate and Assembly, do enact as follows"
  - For acts passed by popular initiative, "The People of the State of Nevada do enact as follows"
- New Hampshire General Court: "Be it Enacted by the Senate and House of Representatives in General Court convened:"
- New Jersey Legislature: "Be It Enacted by the Senate and General Assembly of the State of New Jersey:"
- New Mexico Legislature: "Be it enacted by the legislature of the state of New Mexico"
- New York Legislature: "The People of the State of New York, represented in Senate and Assembly, do enact as follows,"
- North Carolina General Assembly: "The General Assembly of North Carolina enacts:"
- North Dakota Legislative Assembly: "Be it enacted by the Legislative Assembly of North Dakota"
- Ohio General Assembly: "Be it enacted by the general assembly of the state of Ohio" (sic)
- Oklahoma Legislature: "Be it enacted By the People of the State of Oklahoma"
- Oregon Legislative Assembly: "Be It Enacted by the People of the State of Oregon:"
- Pennsylvania General Assembly: "The General Assembly of the Commonwealth of Pennsylvania hereby enacts as follows:"
- Rhode Island General Assembly: "It is enacted by the General Assembly as follows:"
- South Carolina General Assembly: "Be it enacted by the General Assembly of the State of South Carolina:"
- South Dakota Legislature: "Be it enacted by the Legislature of the State of South Dakota"
- Tennessee General Assembly: "Be it enacted by the General Assembly of the State of Tennessee"
- Texas Legislature: "Be it enacted by the Legislature of the State of Texas:"
- Utah State Legislature:"Be it enacted by the Legislature of the State of Utah,"
- Vermont General Assembly: "It is hereby enacted by the General Assembly of the State of Vermont:"
- Virginia General Assembly: "Be it enacted by the General Assembly of Virginia"
- Washington State Legislature: "Be it enacted by the Legislature of the State of Washington:"
- West Virginia Legislature: "Be it enacted by the Legislature of West Virginia:"
- Wisconsin Legislature: "The people of the state of Wisconsin, represented in senate and assembly, do enact as follows:"
- Wyoming Legislature: "Be it Enacted by the Legislature of the State of Wyoming:"

==== D.C. council and territorial legislatures ====
- District of Columbia Council: "Be it enacted by the Council of the District of Columbia,"
- Virgin Islands Legislature: "Be it enacted by the Legislature of the Virgin Islands,"
- Legislature of Guam: "Be it enacted by the people of Guam"
