= Chronological Table of Private and Personal Acts =

The Chronological Table of Private and Personal Acts is a list of private acts and (public) personal acts passed by the Parliament of England, the Parliament of Great Britain and the Parliament of the United Kingdom since 1539.

The table was produced by the Law Commission and the Scottish Law Commission who produced a report on it. A version of the table is now published on the website Legislation.gov.uk.

Lawyer James Colquhoun said that the table makes it "markedly easier" to determine whether private acts have been repealed or otherwise amended.

== See also ==
- Chronological Table of the Statutes
- Chronological Table of Local Legislation
