= Statute Law Revision Act 1888 =

Act of the Parliament of the United Kingdom

Statute Law Revision Act 1888 (Note: Section 2.)
- Act of Parliament
- Parliament of the United Kingdom
- Long title: An Act for further promoting the Revision of the Statute Law by repealing superfluous expressions of enactment, and enactments which have ceased to be in force or have become unnecessary.
- Citation: 51 & 52 Vict. c. 3
- Introduced by: Hardinge Giffard, 1st Baron Halsbury (Lords)
- Territorial extent: United Kingdom

Dates
- Royal assent: 27 March 1888
- Commencement: 27 March 1888 (Note: The Acts of Parliament (Commencement) Act 1793.)
- Repealed: United Kingdom: 16 November 1989
Other legislation
Amends	See § Repealed enactments
Repeals/revokes	See § Repealed enactments
Amended by	Statute Law Revision Act 1908; Administration of Justice (Miscellaneous Provisions) Act 1938
Repealed by	Statute Law (Repeals) Act 1989
Relates to	Repeal of Obsolete Statutes Act 1856; See Statute Law Revision Act

Status: Repealed

History of passage through Parliament

Records of Parliamentary debate relating to the statute from Hansard

Text of statute as originally enacted

The Statute Law Revision Act 1888 (51 & 52 Vict. c. 3) was an act of the Parliament of the United Kingdom that repealed various United Kingdom statutes which had ceased to be in force or had become necessary. The act was intended, in particular, to facilitate the preparation of the new edition of the revised edition of the statutes, then in progress.

The act went further than previous Statute Law Revision Acts, in so far as it omitted unnecessary words.

== Background ==
In the United Kingdom, acts of Parliament remain in force until expressly repealed. Blackstone's Commentaries on the Laws of England, published in the late 18th-century, raised questions about the system and structure of the common law and the poor drafting and disorder of the existing statute book.

From 1810 to 1825, the The Statutes of the Realm was published, providing the first authoritative collection of acts. The first statute law revision act was not passed until 1856 with the Repeal of Obsolete Statutes Act 1856 (19 & 20 Vict. c. 64). This approach — focusing on removing obsolete laws from the statute book followed by consolidation — was proposed by Peter Locke King MP, who had been highly critical of previous commissions' approaches, expenditures, and lack of results.

== Passage ==
The Statute Law Revision Bill had its first reading in the House of Lords on 9 March 1888, introduced by the Lord Chancellor, Hardinge Giffard, 1st Baron Halsbury. The bill had its second reading in the House of Lords on 15 March 1888 and was committed to a Committee of the Whole House, which met and reported on 19 March 1888, without amendments. The bill had its third reading in the House of Lords on 20 March 1888 and passed, without amendments.

The bill had its first reading in the House of Commons on 21 March 1888. The bill had its second reading in the House of Commons on 22 March 1888 and was committed to a Committee of the Whole House, which met and reported on 23 March 1888, without amendments. The bill had its third reading in the House of Commons on 23 March 1888 and passed, without amendments.

The bill was granted royal assent on 27 March 1888.

== Subsequent developments ==
The act was intended, in particular, to facilitate the preparation of the new edition of the revised edition of the statutes. Courtenay Ilbert remarked that the act went further than previous Statute Law Revision Acts, in so far as it omitted unnecessary words.

The power given to the Lord Chancellor to repeal the acts listed in part III of the act was not exercised; instead section 2(2) of, and part III of the schedule to, the act were repealed by sections 12 and 20(3) and (5) of, and schedule 4 to, the Administration of Justice (Miscellaneous Provisions) Act 1938 (1 & 2 Geo. 6. c. 63), which came into force on 1 January 1939. The act abolished all outlawry proceedings.

The schedule to the act was repealed by section 1 of, and the schedule to, the Statute Law Revision Act 1908 (8 Edw. 7. c. 49), which came into force on 21 December 1908.

The whole act was repealed by section 1(1) of, and part XI of schedule 1 to, the Statute Law (Repeals) Act 1989, which came into force on 16 November 1989.

The act was retained for the Republic of Ireland by section 2(2)(a) of, and part 4 of schedule 1 to, the Statute Law Revision Act 2007, which came into force on 8 May 2007.

== Repealed enactments ==
Section 1 of the act 620 repealed enactments, listed in the schedule to the act, across six categories: (Note: The Note of the bill, unlike the schedule, gives commentary on each act, noting any earlier repeals and the reason for the new repeal.)

- Expired
- Spent
- Repealed in general terms
- Virtually repealed
- Superseded
- Obsolete

Section 1 of the act included several safeguards to ensure that the repeal does not negatively affect existing rights or ongoing legal matters. Specifically, any legal rights, privileges, or remedies already obtained under the repealed laws, as well as any legal proceedings or principles established by them, remain unaffected. Section 1 of the act also ensured that repealed enactments that have been incorporated into other laws would continue to have legal effect in those contexts. Moreover, the repeal would not revive any former rights, offices, or jurisdictions that had already been abolished.

- Part I of the act removed the enacting formula from later sections, preserving for each act only a single enacting formula before its first section. This concise style had been usual for new acts of Parliament for several decades; Hardinge Giffard, Baron Halsbury said the deletions would lessen by 60 pages the size of the first volume of the revised edition of the statutes.
- Part II of the schedule to the act listed 15 acts, some of which had the same deletion of enacting formulae as in Schedule I, but all of which had miscellaneous other repeals.
- Part III of the schedule to the act listed 8 acts regulating criminal proceedings, which were obsolete except as regards prosecuting outlawry at assizes. These acts would be repealed in toto if and when the Lord Chancellor decided to extend to the courts of assize the 1886 High Court of Justice rules for proceedings in outlawry. This power was not executed and these acts were repealed by the Administration of Justice (Miscellaneous Provisions) Act 1938 (1 & 2 Geo. 6. c. 63).

== See also ==
- Statute Law Revision Act
