= Revised Statutes =

Term used in some common law jurisdictions

Revised Statutes is a term used in some common law jurisdictions for a collection of statutes that have been revised to incorporate amendments, repeals and consolidations. It is not a change to the law, but designed to make the body of statutes more accessible.

Statute revisions have occurred in the United Kingdom, Canada, Australia, Ireland, and the United States. In federal states, statute revisions can occur at both the federal level, and the state or provincial level.

== See also ==
- Statute Law Revision Act
- Revised edition of the statutes (United Kingdom)
- Revised Statutes of Canada
- Revised Statutes of the United States
- Oregon Revised Statutes
- Revised Statutes of Ontario
