= Advisory Committee on Statute Law =

In the United Kingdom, the Advisory Committee on Statute Law replaced the Statute Law Committee and the editorial board of Statutes in Force in 1991. The decision to do this was made by Lord Mackay of Clashfern LC.

The members of this committee are listed in The Civil Service Year Book and Whitaker's Almanack. They have also been listed in Dod's Parliamentary Companion.

== Composition ==
As of 1995, the Lord Chancellor was the chairman of the committee. His permanent secretary was alternate chairman. The other members of the committee were the Clerk of the Parliaments, the Clerk of the House of Commons, the Chairman of the Law Commission, the Chairman of the Scottish Law Commission, the First Parliamentary Counsel, the Legal Secretary to the Lord Advocate and First Scottish Parliamentary Counsel, the First Legislative Counsel for Northern Ireland, the Treasury Solicitor, the Solicitor to the Scottish Office and representatives from Her Majesty's Stationery Office and the Lord Chancellor's Department.
