= Statutes in Force =

Statutes in Force was the fourth revised edition of the statutes. Publication began in 1972. It was completed in 1981.

Statutes in Force continued to be updated until 1 February 1991. Work on revised material for Statutes in Force was suspended on account of the preparation of the Statute Law Database.

The length of Statutes in Force exceeded sixty thousand pages. Statutes in Force consisted of booklets or pamphlets or leaflets that were punched and inserted in ring binders. Statutes in Force has been described as a "loose booklet", "quasi loose leaf", "modified loose leaf" or "loose leaf" publication.

Glanville Williams said that Statutes in Force was defective in that it did not contain "proper" annotations to the statutes, but that he preferred it to Halsbury's Statutes because it did not break up the statutes between titles in the way, which he considered inconvenient, that Halsbury's Statutes did. Halsbury's Laws of England said that Statutes in Force was not "altogether successful".

In 1991, the editorial board of Statutes in Force was replaced by the Advisory Committee on Statute Law.

Statutes in Force is the source of the originating text of most of the revised content published on Legislation.gov.uk.
