= Syntegra =

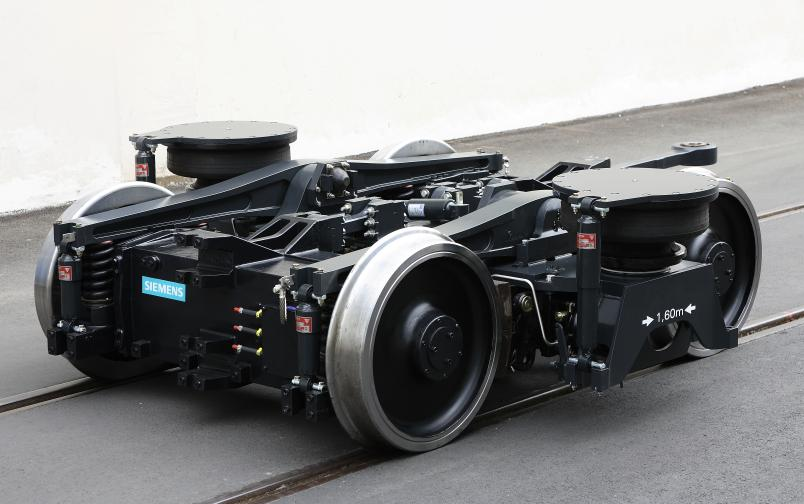
Syntegra bogie

Syntegra is a bogie developed by Siemens incorporating an axle mounted gearless electric drive in an inboard bogie.

The design was unveiled at Innotrans in 2006, and began service trials in 2008 on the Munich U-Bahn.

== History and design ==
The motor design is a hermetically sealed simple co-axial gearless synchronous motor (a permanent magnet, three phase drive, passively cooled design); the motors can also be used for electrical dynamic braking, and also as an active electric brake. The wheelset bearings are mounted inboard and support both motor, axles and wheel. A traction link from motor to the vehicle frame transmits tractive forces.

The bogie frame has a single central cross member which supports via pivots two longitudinal beams (in a 'weighing scale' arrangement) connected to the wheelset via the primary suspension. The cross member supports the vehicle body via the secondary suspension of two outboard air springs.

In mid-2006 prototype motors rated 110 kilowatts (150 hp), with claimed 96% efficiency, were fitted to an ex-Munich U-Bahn vehicle for testing at the Wegberg-Wildenrath test circuit. In 2008 a train fitted with two Syntegra bogies began in-service tests on the Munich U-Bahn.

A 150 kilowatts (200 hp) prototype was displayed at Innotrans (2009), the prototype bogie weight was 5.6 tonnes (5.5 long tons; 6.2 short tons), with a 1.6-metre (63-inch) wheelbase and a maximum axleload of 14 tonnes (14 long tons; 15 short tons).
