= Legislation.gov.uk =

Official Web-accessible database of the statute law of the United Kingdom

legislation.gov.uk
- Website type: Government website
- Available in: English and Welsh
- Owners: The National Archives, UK Government
- Website: legislation.gov.uk
- Commercial: No
- Current status: Active

legislation.gov.uk, formerly known as the UK Statute Law Database, is the official Web-accessible database of the statute law of the United Kingdom, hosted by The National Archives. Established in the early 2000s, it contains all primary legislation in force since 1267 and all secondary legislation since 1823; it does not include legislation which was fully repealed prior to 1991. The contents have been revised to reflect legislative changes up to 2002, with material that has been amended since 2002 fully updated and searchable.

== New Statute Law Database ==
In December 2008, the Statute Law Database team transferred to The National Archives, which meant the responsibility for the Office of Public Sector Information and SLD websites became the responsibility of one department. A major consideration of the transfer was to enable the rationalization of the two websites in order to provide one point of access to all UK legislation and in doing so reduce duplication in effort, increase efficiency (for example taking advantage of technological developments to streamline processes) and provide a more user-friendly and accessible service across the board. Since December 2008 a considerable amount of work has taken place to look at who the customers of the joint services are and look carefully at their requirements.

The content of the new Statute Law Database consists of the combined content of the previous UK Statute Law Database (SLD) and the Office of Public Sector Information (OPSI) website. Updated legislation on the new website is the same data as that available on SLD. The only exceptions are a few acts that are being updated by the editorial team that is available on SLD but will not be available on the new site until the revisions are complete and they are ready to be published to SLD and the new website. Many of the revised documents held by SLD are also available in the OPSI dataset as an "as enacted" version. The new website combines these so one can switch between the different versions.

Aspects of the new site:

- The majority of revised legislation, now held the 'as enacted' and 'revised' versions. The different versions can be accessed via the buttons in the 'What Version' area on the table of contents.
- 'Next' and 'Previous' buttons are now available when navigating the content of legislation (this has only been made possible because of the way the legislation is held on the new site).
- 'Change to Legislation' – Much work has been done in order to make the revised legislation as usable as possible although it is not fully up to date. The development of the new site has allowed us to take the 'Tables of Legislative Effects' information currently published on SLD and incorporate the 'unapplied effects' into the content of the legislation at the provision level. This means that instead of having to look through the 'Tables of Effects' year by year in order to establish the current position of a piece of legislation, one can access all the outstanding effects when viewing the act. The outstanding effects also include links to the affecting legislation meaning that one can view the amendments more easily.
- Links in annotations – all annotations giving authority for amendments that have been applied now contain links to the affecting legislation (on SLD will only be able to do this for amendments carried out post-2002.)
- Probably one of the main areas of difference from SLD is that the 'attributes' information has been removed from the foot of the provisions in order to make it more meaningful to users. The 'geographical extent' can now be turned on and off using the 'show geographical extent' button and the 'start date' information is now presented on the 'Timeline of Changes' so as to give the ability to navigate through the legislation at specific points in time.

== History ==
=== Background ===
Access to statute law in the United Kingdom was, for some time, a difficult matter. As the Hansard Society noted in 1992, "[a]t present the accessibility of statute law to users and the wider public is slow, inconvenient, complicated and subject to several impediments. To put it bluntly, it is often very difficult to find out what the text of a law is – let alone what it means. Something must be done."

=== Development ===
==== 1991 to 1995 ====
The idea for creating a UK-wide legislation database dates back to 1991 when the government awarded a contract to Syntegra, a BT company previously known as "Secure Information Systems Limited", to create a database containing all the public Acts comprised in the publication Statutes in Force together with all amendments made since a "base date" of 1 February 1991. The database was delivered by Syntegra in November 1993, but not accepted by the government until Summer 1995 at a cost of £700,000. The database was originally intended for use by the Office of the Parliamentary Counsel, but following testing with the public service it was decided to make it available to legal practitioners and the private sector on a commercial basis, as well as to public libraries and Citizens Advice Bureaux.

The original database consisted of an Interleaf editorial system which allowed legislation to be held and edited in SGML. In 1991 there were no plans to make the database available on the Internet. The aim of the project was to create an electronic version of Statutes In Force which would be available on CD-ROM to much the same audience as that to which Statutes In Force had been available prior to 1991.

In 1995 Syntegra developed the first version of the Statute Law Database website. This was only ever available in pilot form and to a limited number of government users.

==== 1996 to 2000 ====
On 9 February 1996, Roger Freeman, the Chancellor of the Duchy of Lancaster, announced that the copyright and charging policy of the Statute Law Database would "be decided nearer the time of implementation in 1997". This date was pushed forwarded to 1999 and then to 2000.

In March 1999, it was disclosed that "[t]he partially updated database is presently available to a number of users within central government who have access to the Statutory Publications Office Intranet. The Lord Chancellor's Department are considering options for the future marketing of the Statute Law Database. These options include free Internet access, the granting of non-exclusive licences to legal information publishers and the provision of a subscription on-line service." In September a demonstration version of the database was made available on the Syntegra Track Record website, containing legislation for the years 1985 to 1995, though this was quickly removed.

==== 2001 to 2006 ====
In 2004, it was announced that the system designed by Syntegra would be modernised by replacing its editorial database, developing two new enquiry systems (one for government departments (accessible via the Government Secure Intranet, "GSI") and the other for the general public), and the revision and updating of the statute book. Two contracts were signed by the Department for Constitutional Affairs (DCA) with Computacenter, one for the delivery of the editorial system, the other for the government enquiry system. The combined cost of the contracts was £458,000.

A content management system named TSO ActiveText (after TSO, The Stationery Office) is used in the new system to store legislation in XML with a specific DTD. Documents in ActiveText are fragmented and can be edited using XMetaL which allows editors to check documents in and out of the database for editing. All the legislation from the original SGML database was converted into XML. After the editorial system was completed, further development began on a new online Statute Law Database Enquiry System.

The government's enquiry system was launched on 31 May 2006 with a plan to roll out general access in three phases. The first stage would open the database to a very limited number of users for testing. On 2 August 2006 the Department for Constitutional Affairs (DCA) commenced the second stage of the database project, allowing the system to be tested in use by issuing login details and passwords to a wide range of selected customers including government users, law librarians, police staff, Citizens Advice Bureaux and students. The pilot did not specifically include any commercial legal publishers. Initially, the DCA intended to charge users for access to "historical law", but not current law, however, following pressure notably from The Guardian and its "Free Our Data" campaign, it was announced in October that the system would be free to use. The SPO's Clare Allison revealed nevertheless that the DCA would be "looking at options that concern the commercial reuse of the data".

The delays involved in realising the database led to a number groups requesting the raw data of the legislation in order to put together their own versions. Among those refused access was Julian Todd, the co-creator of the website TheyWorkForYou, who stated "I can't comprehend what the DCA thinks it is gaining by not giving us a database dump of the law." Todd had submitted a request under the Freedom of Information Act 2000 for disclosure of the data, but this was refused and he brought an appeal before the Information Commissioner.

The database was finally made available to the public on 20 December 2006. Announcing its launch, Baroness Ashton, a Parliamentary Under-Secretary in the Department for Constitutional Affairs, said that "[t]he Statute Law Database provides an authoritative and easy-to-use historical database of UK statute law. I hope it will be welcomed as a useful tool for professionals who need to keep up with changes to the law as well as those who simply have an interest in historic and current legislation."

== Content ==
The database contains the text of primary legislation since 1267 and secondary legislation issued after 1823, some 80,000 texts. All primary legislation on the site has been revised to show the effect of legislation and amendments enacted until 2002. The database is not fully up to date and, as of 2009, there is no estimate for when it will be fully up to date. Acts are targeted for updating according to a system of priorities based on demand ascertained mainly from Webtrends reports showing which acts are viewed most frequently. Until December 2008, the responsibility for keeping the database up-to-date lay with the Statutory Publications Office, part of the Ministry of Justice. Since that date, responsibility has been transferred to a team within the Information and Policy Services Directorate (formerly called the Office of Public Sector Information) of The National Archives. Following the transfer, a programme of work is now underway to bring together the content of the existing Statute Law Database with "as enacted" original legislation from the website of the Office of Public Sector Information (OPSI) to form a single "UK Legislation" website.

In addition, a "table of effects" has been published every year since 2002 which lists all the legislation repealed, the effects of primary and secondary legislation brought into force since 2002 on primary legislation in the database.

=== Primary legislation ===
The database content includes the following primary legislation in

- Acts of the Parliament of Great Britain (1707–1800);
- Acts of the English Parliament (1267–1706);
- Acts of the pre-UK parliaments (1424–1707);
- UK local acts (from 1991);
- Acts of the Scottish Parliament (1999 to date);
- Measures of the Welsh Assembly (2007 to 2011);
- Acts of Senedd Cymru (Welsh Assembly) (2011 to date);
- Acts of the Irish Parliament (1495–1800);
- Acts of the Parliament of Northern Ireland (1921–1972);
- Measures of the Northern Ireland Assembly (1974);
- Acts of the Northern Ireland Assembly (2000–2002, 2007 to date);
- Orders in Council made under Northern Ireland Acts (1974 to date);
- Church of England measures (1920 to date).

Other primary legislation that is held in unrevised form includes:

- Post-1991 local acts (and a small number of pre-1991 local acts).

=== Secondary legislation ===
The database also contains certain secondary legislation which is mostly updated:

- Statutory instruments (from 1948);
- Welsh statutory instruments (from 1999);
- Scottish statutory instruments (from 1999);
- Statutory rules of Northern Ireland (from 1991);
- Church of England instruments (from 1991).

== Current limitations ==
While the database reflects amendments to primary legislation, it is not up to date.

Also the database does not currently include:

- Some of the pre-1991 repealed legislation;
- Most pre-1991 local acts;
- Secondary legislation pre-dating 1823;
- Orders in Council made under the royal prerogative;
- Byelaws.

There are no plans to extend the database to include the above material. However, a Select Committee report on the "Merits of Statutory Instruments", published on 7 November 2006, recommended that the database should be extended to cover secondary as well as primary legislation. The government responded that this was indeed important, but that "[t]he immediate priority is to ensure that a fully revised and up to date version of the official statute book is delivered for use by the public and that work on this is maintained. After this has been achieved consideration will then be given as to how work can be extended to updating secondary legislation."

== See also ==
- Halsbury's Statutes
