= Statute Law Committee =

The Statute Law Committee was appointed for the purpose of superintending the publication of the first revised edition of the statutes in the United Kingdom. It also prepared the bills for Statute Law Revision Acts up to, and including, the Statute Law Revision Act 1966.

The committee was appointed in 1868 by Lord Cairns LC. In autumn 1947, the committee was reconstituted by the Viscount Jowitt LC and given the following terms of reference:

To consider the steps necessary to bring the Statute Book up to date by consolidation, revision, and otherwise, and to superintend the publication and indexing of statutes, revised statutes, and statutory instruments.

The committee was replaced in 1991 by the Advisory Committee on Statute Law.
