= Revised edition of the statutes =

Revised edition of the statutes in the United Kingdom

A revised edition of the statutes is an edition of the Revised Statutes in the United Kingdom (there being more than one edition). These editions are published by authority.

In 1861 the Parliament of the United Kingdom passed the first of a long series of Statute Law Revision Acts. The most important action was the nomination of a Statute Law Committee by Lord Chancellor Cairns in 1868, the practical result of which was the issuing of the first edition of the Revised Statutes in eighteen volumes, bringing the revision of statute law down to 1886. (Note: This edition was of course subject to the disadvantage that it becomes less accurate every year as new legislation appeared. James Williams writing in the Encyclopaedia Britannica Eleventh Edition (1911) stated that a Chronological Table and Index of the Statutes which were still law was still being published from time to time by the council of law reporting.)

The third edition of The Statutes Revised was published by HMSO in 1950. The fourth revised edition of the statutes was called Statutes in Force.

The Statute Law Committee was appointed for the purpose of superintending the publication of the first revised edition of the statutes.

For the purpose of citation "Statutes Revised" may be abbreviated to "Rev Stat".

Section 3 of the Statute Law Revision Act 1948 now provides:

(1) From any revised edition of the statutes published by authority there may be omitted-

(a) words of enactment, whether in the form "Be it enacted by the King's (or Queen's) most excellent Majesty by and with the advice and consent of the Lords Spiritual and Temporal and Commons in this present Parliament assembled and by the authority of the same as follows" or in any other form or to the like effect, and words such as "item," "also" and "that" referring to or consequential on words of enactment;
(b) clauses of attestation added to ancient statutes;
...

(2) An omission made under the authority of this Act shall not affect the construction or interpretation of any statute.

Section 3(1) of the Statute Law Revision Act 1950 now provides:

From any revised edition of the statutes published by authority there may be omitted enactments or words in respect of matters exclusively relating to territory within the jurisdiction of any one or more of the following, that is to say, Canada, Australia, New Zealand, . . . the Republic of Ireland, . . . and, so far as relates to matters within the powers of the Parliament thereof, Northern Ireland.

Without prejudice to any other saving contained in the Statute Law Revision Act 1950, an omission made under the authority of section 3 of that Act does not affect the construction or interpretation of any statute.

Where any Act cites or refers to another Act otherwise than by its short title, the short title may, in any revised edition of the statutes printed by authority, be printed in substitution for such citation or reference.

Where an Act cites another Act by year, statute, session or chapter, or a section or other portion of another Act by number or letter, the reference must, unless the contrary intention appears, be read as referring, in the case of Acts included in any revised edition of the statutes printed by authority, to that edition.

== History ==
Section 1 of the Statute Law Revision Act 1948 formerly provided that every part of a title, preamble, or recital specified after the words "in part, namely," in connection with an Act mentioned in the First Schedule to that Act might be omitted from any revised edition of the statutes published by authority after the passing of that Act, and there might be added in the said edition such brief statement of the Acts, officers, persons, and things mentioned in the title, preamble, or recital, as might in consequence of such omission appear necessary.

Sections 3(1)(c) to (f) of that Act formerly authorised the omission of:

(c) in any enactment relating to the courts now merged in the Supreme Court the words "debt," "suit," "bill," "plaint," "proceeding" or any of those words occurring after or in connection with the word "action";
(d) in any enactment relating to Scotland the word "stewartry" occurring in connection with the word "shire," "sheriffdom" or "county," and the word "stewart" occurring in connection with the word "sheriff," whether any of these words be used in the singular or the plural;
(e) the words "of", "and" or "or" were used in connection with any word omitted by virtue of paragraphs (c) and (d) of this subsection; and
(f) enactments or words in respect of matters exclusively relating to territory within the jurisdiction of a self-governing Dominion.

See also section 3 of the Statute Law Revision (No. 2) Act 1890, section 4 of the Statute Law Revision Act 1894, and section 3 of the Statute Law Revision Act 1927.

== Northern Ireland ==
The Revised Edition of The Irish Statutes was published by authority in 1885. It was prepared by W F Cullinan.

The official revised version of the primary legislation of Northern Ireland is called The Northern Ireland Statutes Revised or The Statutes Revised: Northern Ireland.

See section 5 of the Statute Law Revision Act 1950, the Statute Law Revision Act (Northern Ireland) 1952 and section 47(3) of the Interpretation Act (Northern Ireland) 1954.

== Scotland ==
See sections 10(2)(a) and 11(2)(a) of the Interpretation and Legislative Reform (Scotland) Act 2010 (asp 10).

The First Revised Edition was published in 1908. It was based on the Record Edition. The Second Revised Edition of The Acts of the Parliaments of Scotland 1424-1707 was published by authority in 1966. It was prepared by the Scottish Parliamentary Draftsmen and based on the First Edition. The text of the Acts of the Parliaments of Scotland in Statutes in Force was taken from the Second Revised Edition.

== See also ==
- Oregon Revised Statutes
- Revised Statutes of the United States
- UK Statute Law Database
