= Statute law revision =

Legal process in Commonwealth realms

Statute law revision may refer to the printing of, or the editorial process of preparing, a revised edition of the statutes, or to the process of repealing obsolete enactments to facilitate the preparation of such an edition, or to facilitate the consolidation of enactments.

== United Kingdom ==
=== History ===
In the United Kingdom, acts of Parliament may cease to operate through expiry or implied repeal, as well as through express repeal. Statute law revision has included the express repeal of provisions that had already ceased to operate, as well as provisions that had become unnecessary. Consolidation of the statute book has been discussed since at least the 16th century and the English Reformation.

==== Early efforts ====
In 1549, the House of Commons sent a proposal to the House of Lords that the statute law "should be digested into a body under titles and heads and put into good Latin", in imitation of Roman law.

In 1551, in his Discourse on the Reformation of Abuses, King Edward VI, then aged 14, wrote:

"I have showed my opinion heretofore of the statutes I think most necessary to be enacted this Session. Nevertheless, I would wish that besides them and hereafter, when time shall serve, the superfluous and tedious statutes were brought into one sum together, and made more plain and short, to the intent that men might better understand them; which thing shall much help to advance the profit of the Commonwealth."

These efforts, culminating in a proposal for bringing common law into the statute law, were observed by Bishop Burnet as "too great a design to be set on foot or finished under an infant king".

Revision of the statutes was regarded by the Parliament of England as desirable as early as 1563. For example, the Statute of Labourers 1562/Statute of Artificers 1562 (5 Eliz. 1. c. 4), considered by Courtenay Ilbert as one of the first Consolidation Acts, gave reasons for the expediency of consolidation.

"Althoughe there remayne and stande in force pntly a greate nomber of Actes and Statutes concerning the reteyning departing wages and orders of Apprentices Servantes and Labourers, as well in Husbandrye as in divers other Artes Misteries and occupacons, yet ptly for thimperfeccon and contrarietie that ys founde and doo appeare in sundrye of the sayde Lawes, and for the varyetie and nomber of them, and chiefly for that the wages and allouances lymytted and rated in many of the sayd Statutes, are in dyvers places to small and not answerable to this tyme, respecting thadvancement of Pryses of all things belonging to the sayd Servantes and Labourers, the said Lawes cannot conveniently without the greate greefe and burden of the poore Labourer and hired man, bee put in good and due execution : And as the sayd severall Actes and Statutes were at the time of the making of them thought to be very good and beneficiall for the Comon wealthe of this Realms as dyvers of them yet are, So yf the substance of as many of the said Lawes as are meet to bee continued shalbe digested and reduced into one sole Lawe and Statute, & in the same an uniforme Order prescrybed and lymitted concerning the Wages and other Orders for Apprentises Servauntes and Laborers, there ys good hope that yt will come to passe that the same Lawe, beyng duly executed, should banishe Idlenes advance Husbandrye and yeelde unto the hired pson bothe in the tyme of scarsitee and in the tyme of plentye a convenient proporcon of Wages."

During the reign of Queen Elizabeth I, Sir Nicholas Bacon, the Lord Keeper of the Great Seal, drew up a scheme for reducing, ordering, and printing the statutes of the realm:

"First, where many lawes be made for one thing, the same are to be reduced and established into one lawe, and the former to be abrogated.

Item, where there is but one lawe for one thing, that these are to remain in case as they be. Item, that all the Acts be digested into titles and printed according to the abridgment of the statutes.

Item, where part of one Acte standeth in force and another part abrogated, there shall be no more printed, but that that standeth in force.

The doeing of these things maie be committed to the persons hereunder written, if it shall so please Her Majestic and her Counsell, and daye wolde be given to the committees until the first daie of Michlemass Terme next coming for the doing of this, and then they are to declare their doings, to be considered by such persons as it shall please Her Majestie to appoint."

Bacon named twenty committees, each consisting of four members (one judge and three counsel) with an assigned title or division of the statute law. This was considered for penal laws in 1584 (27 Eliz. 1), by Sir Edward Coke and Sir Francis Bacon in 1593 (35 Eliz. 1) and 1597 (39 & 40 Eliz. 1), and 1601 (43 Eliz. 1).

A letter from Lord Bacon, dated 27 February 1608, held amongst the papers of William Petyt, Keeper of the Records in the Tower of London and Treasurer of the Inner Temple, proposed a plan for consolidation using a manuscript collection of the statutes kept by Michael Heneage, Keeper of the Tower Records, which the editors of The Statutes of the Realm feared had been lost.

Proposing reform to the statutes in Parliament in 1609, King James I spoke from the throne of:

"divers cross and cuffing statutes, and some so penned that they may be taken in divers, yea, contrary senses... therefore would I wish both these statutes and reports, as well in the Parliament as common law, to be once maturely reviewed and reconciled; and that not only all contrarieties should be scraped out of our bookes, but even that such penal statutes as were made but for the use of the time (from breach whereof not man can be free) which dos not now agree with the condition of this our time, might likewise be left out of our bookes, which under a tyrannous or avaricious king could not be endured. And this reformation might (me thinkes) bee made a worthy worke, and well deserves a Parliament to be set of purpose for it"

In 1610, the House of Commons, with permission of the House of Lords on 23 July 1610, petitioned the crown to appoint a commission to "make a diligent Survey of all the Penal Statutes of this Realm, to the End that such as are obsolete or unprofitable may be repealed; and that, for the better Ease and Certainty of the Subject, all such as are profitable, concerning One Matter, may be reduced into One Statute, to be passed in Parliament."

In 1616, Sir Francis Bacon, then Attorney General, submitted to King James I a proposal "touching the compiling and amendment of the laws of England". Bacon recommended a reform of all the statute law (and penal laws in particular), proposing that "the work to be done consisteth of two parts, the digest or recompiling of the common laws, and that of the statutes".

For the common law, Bacon proposed three steps:

1. The compiling of a book De antiquitatibus juris.
2. The reducing or perfecting of the course or corps of the common laws.
3. The composing of certain introductive and auxiliary books touching the study of these laws.

For the statute law, Bacon proposed four steps:

"1. The first is to discharge the books of those statutes whereas the case by alteration of time is vanished, as Lombards, Jews, Gauls, halfpence, &c. Those may, nevertheless, remain in the libraries for antiquities, but no reprinting of them. The like of statutes long since expired and clearly repealed; for if the repeal be doubtful, it must be so propounded to Parliament.

2. The next is to repeal all statutes which are sleeping and not of use, but yet snaring and in force. In some of those it will perhaps be requisite to substitute some more reasonable law instead of them, agreeable to the time; in others a simple repeal may suffice.

3. The third, that the grievousness of the penalty in many statutes may be mitigated, though the ordinance stand.

4. The last is the reducing of concurrent statutes heaped one upon another to one clear and uniform law."

Bacon reported that work to reduce the statutes into one clear and uniform law had already made considerable progress under the King's command, through himself, Sir Henry Hobart, Henry Finch, William Noy and others. He described this as "An excellent Undertaking, of Honour to His Majesty's Times, and of good to all Times". For the preparation of consolidation bills, he recommended commissioners nominated by both Houses of Parliament. He cited the commissions concerning ecclesiastical law under the Ecclesiastical Canons Act 1535 (27 Hen. 8. c. 15) and Canon Law Act 1549 (3 & 4 Edw. 6. c. 11), and the commission on the union of England and Scotland, as precedents.

The editors of The Statutes of the Realm described an unsigned manuscript, then in the British Museum, listing statutes from 3 Edw. 1 to 7 Jas. 1 that had been repealed or had expired, together with proposed repeals, changes and consolidation bills, and reasons arranged in tables. They suggested that it might be connected with the work described by Bacon. Ilbert separately described a manuscript covering 3 Edw. 1 to 2 Jas. 1, which he tentatively associated with the commission appointed following the 1610 petition.

The editors of The Statutes of the Realm suggested that Bacon's fall from grace in 1621 and more immediate parliamentary business probably accounted for the failure to pursue his proposals.

==== Commonwealth ====
During the Commonwealth, on 21 June 1650 a committee was appointed, "to revise all former statutes and ordinances now in force and consider, as well, which are fit to be continued, altered or repealed, as how the same may be reduced into a more compendious Way, and exact Method, for the more Ease, and clearer Understanding, of the People." The membership of the committee included the Lord Commissioner of the Great Seal, Bulstrode Whitelocke. The committee was empowered "to advise with the Judges: and to send for, and to employ, and call to their Assistance herein, any other Persons whom they shall think fit, for the better Effecting thereof; and to prepare the same for the farther Consideration of this House; and to make report thereof".

On 26 December 1651 the Commons resolved to refer the consideration of defects in the law to persons outside the House, and appointed an MPs' committee to nominate them and receive their proposals. Its members were the Lord General, Mr. Carew, Lieutenant General Fleetwood, Major General Harrison, Mr. Westrow, Alderman Allein, Colonel Sidney, Lord Commissioner Whitelock, Lord Commissioner Lisle, the Lord Chief Baron, Mr. Ralegh, Colonel Bennet, Mr. Strickland, Mr. Garland, Mr. Dove, Mr. Corbett, Sir Henry Heyman, Mr. Dormer, Mr. Bond, Sir Gilbert Pickering, Colonel Jones, Sir Henry Mildmay, Colonel Fielder, Colonel Rich, Sir Arthure Hesilrig, Colonel Norton and Mr. Attorney. The quorum was five.

On 17 January 1652 (1651 in Old Style dating), the Commons appointed the outside body subsequently known as the Hale Commission. Its members were Matthew Hale, William Steele, the Recorder of London, Charles George Cock, Thomas Manby, John Sadler, Colonel Thomas Blunt, Sir Henry Blunt, Josias Berners, Major General John Desboroe, Samuel Moyer, Colonel Matthew Tomlinson, John Fountaine, Alderman John Fowke, Hugh Peters, Major William Packer, Sir William Roberts, William Methold, John Maunsell, John Rushworth, John Sparrow junior and Sir Anthony Ashley Cooper. The quorum was seven. The commissioners were empowered to consult others and to require the attendance of record keepers with their records. The commission first met on 23 January 1652. On 19 January 1653 the Commons ordered the proposed system of law to be read, and began reading it on 20 January.

On 19 August 1653, another committee was appointed to consider a new body of law. It consisted of Colonel West, Mr. Barebone, Sir Charles Wolseley, Mr. Spence, Mr. Taylor, Mr. Squib, Mr. Highland, Mr. Kenrick, Colonel Blunt, Sir Gilbert Pickering, Mr. Wingfield, Mr. Moyer and Major General Harrison. Its quorum was five, and it had power to send for "Papers, Persons, Records".

The editors of The Statutes of the Realm reported that they had found no records of the committees' proceedings or reports. However, minutes of the Hale commission from 30 January to 23 July 1652 survive in the British Library, as Additional MS 35863.

==== Restoration ====
After the Stuart Restoration, a committee was appointed in 1666 to "confer with such of the Lords, the Judges, and other Persons of the Long Robe, who have already Taken Pains and made progress in perusing the Statute Laws; and to consider of repealing such former Statute Laws as they shall find necessary to be repealed; and of Expedients for reducing all Statute Laws of one Nature under such a Method and Head as may conduce to the more ready Understanding and better Execution of such Laws." The committee consisted of the Solicitor General, Heneage Finch, Serjeant John Maynard, Sir Robert Atkyns, William Prynne and others.

Nothing came of the work of the committee, and this was the last recorded effort of statute law revision by Parliament for some time.

==== 18th century ====
Blackstone's Commentaries on the Laws of England, published in 1765–1769, raised questions about the system and structure of the common law and the poor drafting and disorder of the existing statute book.

On 12 April 1796, the Select Committee on Temporary Laws, Expired or Expiring was appointed to inspect and consider temporary laws, expired or expiring. The committee reported on 12 May 1796, resolving that it was "highly expedient for the honour of the nation and the benefit of all His Majesty's subjects that a complete and authoritative edition of all the statutes should be published", and publishing a Register of Expiring Laws and a Register of Expired Laws.

On 2 November 1796, the Select Committee on the Promulgation of the Statutes was appointed to consider the promulgation of the statutes of Great Britain. The committee reported on 5 December 1796, making recommendations for the increased printing and distribution of public acts and for the improved drafting of temporary law.

The work of both committees drew attention to the unsatisfactory state of the statute book. Following a resolution of the House of Commons on 20 March 1797 that "His Majesty's Printer should also be authorized to class the general and the special statutes (viz. the public, local, and private acts) of each session in separate volumes, and to number the chapters of each volume, together with a general table of all the acts passed in that session", the King's Printer adopted the classification for acts passed from the next session (38 Geo. 3) onwards. This led to the distinction now recognised between public general acts, local and personal acts and private acts.

==== Commission on Public Records ====
The Parliament of Great Britain devoted attention to public records before the Acts of Union 1800 took effect on 1 January 1801, creating the Parliament of the United Kingdom. On 18 February 1800, the Select Committee on the State of Public Records was appointed to inquire into the state of public records in England, Scotland and Ireland.

Following the report of the committee and humble address to the Sovereign from the House of Commons, the first Record Commission was established on 19 July 1800. Successive commissions were issued in 1806, 1817, 1821, 1825, 1831 and 1837.

In 1806, the Commission on Public Records passed a resolution requesting the production of a report on the best mode of reducing the volume of the statute book. From 1810 to 1825, The Statutes of the Realm was published, providing an authoritative collection of early statutes based on original records and manuscripts. Its indexes appeared in 1824 and 1828. In 1816, both Houses of Parliament passed resolutions that an eminent lawyer with 20 clerks be commissioned to make a digest of the statutes, which was declared "very expedient to be done." However, this was never done.

==== Criminal Law Commissions ====
In 1822, Sir Robert Peel entered the cabinet as home secretary and in 1826 introduced a number of reforms to the English criminal law, to modernise, consolidate and repeal provisions from a large number of earlier statutes. These acts, known as Peel's Acts, included:

- Criminal Law Act 1827 (7 & 8 Geo. 4. c. 28), which modernised the administration of criminal justice.
- Larceny Act 1827 (7 & 8 Geo. 4. c. 29), which consolidated provisions in the law relating to larceny.
- Malicious Injuries to Property Act 1827 (7 & 8 Geo. 4. c. 30), which consolidated provisions in the law relating to malicious injuries to property.

In 1828, Henry Brougham MP made a famous six-hour speech in the House of Commons, described in a 1989 Commons debate as the record for a speech in the House, with longer speeches distinguished in committee, which paid tribute to Bentham and set in motion reform of the British legal system. Following the fall of Wellington's administration, Brougham became Lord Chancellor and made codification a matter of official policy.

The Royal Commission on the Criminal Law was established in 1833 and issued its final report in 1845, proposing a draft bill digesting criminal law and procedure. However, support for such a comprehensive legal reform was dissipating. Lord Brougham introduced a bill embodying the digest, but it was withdrawn on an undertaking by Brougham's opponent, Lord Lyndhurst, that a second Commission would be appointed to revise it.

In a supplementary report on the expediency of the consolidation of the different branches of the statute law, dated 17 July 1835 and ordered to be printed on 20 July 1835, the Commissioners recognised the need for statute law revision.

"The imperfections in the statute law arising from mere generality, laxity or ambiguity of expression, are too numerous and too well known to require particular specification. They are the natural result of negligent, desultory and inartificial legislation; the statutes have been framed extemporaneously, not as parts of a system, but to answer particular exigencies as they occurred"

The Royal Commission on Revising and Consolidating the Criminal Law was established in 1845 and issued its final report in 1849. In autumn of 1852, the Lord Chancellor, Edward Sugden, 1st Baron St Leonards, directed James John Lonsdale and Charles Greaves to prepare Bills for the codification of criminal law based on the reports of the Criminal Law Commissioners. Two major Bills based on the work of the Commission covering offences against the person and larceny were introduced in 1853 and continued under Lord Cranworth. The bills made no progress, principally because of the unanimously unfavourable judicial reaction to the prospect of the common law being embodied in statutory form.

==== The first Statute Law Revision Act ====
At the start of the parliamentary session in 1853, the Lord Chancellor, Lord Cranworth announced his intention to improve the statute law, remarking that:

"I think it may be safely said that it is not creditable to any country that its statutes should be in such a condition. ... The great number is of itself a circumstance that affords an irresistible argument for the necessity of doing something, but independently of their enormous quantity, there are other reasons which suggest themselves. They are in a most repulsive form: there is no classification, but they are huddled together in the most complex fashion."

Lord Cranworth also proposed steps towards a Code Victoria:

"The mere enumeration of the statutes that have been repealed would be something; the consolidation of some of the statutes more easy to be dealt with would be something. To simplify our statutes and improve their style would be something,—would be a great deal. But I look further: I conceive there is no reason why this proposed step should not at some future time, some years hence, constitute the formation of that which I have always looked forward to as the most desirable, though heretofore I have feared to be unattainable, a Code Victoria."

In March 1853, Lord Cranworth appointed the Board for the Revision of the Statute Law to repeal expired statutes and continue consolidation, with a wider remit that included civil law. The Board issued three reports dated 18 August 1853, 31 January 1854 and 2 June 1854, recommending the creation of a permanent body for statute law reform.

In 1854, Lord Cranworth appointed the Royal Commission for Consolidating the Statute Law to consolidate existing statutes and enactments of English law. The Commission made four reports dated 10 July 1855, 5 March 1856, 11 June 1857 and 21 June 1859.

The Commission faced significant criticism in Parliament for its slow progress and perceived ineffectiveness. During a May 1855 debate, several MPs, including Richard Malins MP and Charles Napier MP, criticised its slow progress and expenditure. Napier described retaining it solely to advise on the drafting of new statutes as "totally futile". Critics pointed out that while the Commission was deliberating, Parliament continued to pass new acts, further complicating the statute law. The Lord Advocate, James Moncreiff MP defended the Commission, emphasising the enormous difficulty of their task, while the Prime Minister, Viscount Palmerston, acknowledged these challenges but maintained that a Commission, rather than a parliamentary committee, remained the best vehicle for consolidation. The debate ultimately rejected a motion moved by Peter Locke King MP to establish an alternative approach through a select committee.

Following the Commission's second report, which recommended the appointment of an officer or board to revise and improve current legislation, the House of Commons resolved on 25 April 1856, requesting a "Copy of the Memorandum of the Attorney-general as to the plan of proceeding in Consolidation of the Statutes". The memorandum, dated 2 April 1856, was published on 9 May 1856. Attorney General, Alexander Cockburn, proposed a plan of proceeding for the consolidation of the statutes, remarking that:

"In order to form a correct judgment as to the course of proceeding which it is expedient to adopt in the Consolidation of the Statutes, it is, in the first place, necessary to have a clear view of what is the true nature and extent of the work which the Commission is called upon to execute. It will then be seen how far what has hitherto been proposed is adequate to the magnitude and importance of the work to be accomplished. To me, I must acknowledge, it appears that the view which has been taken of the object has been too limited and narrow, and that the mode of proceeding has, in consequence, been far from commensurate to the magnitude of the undertaking.

It can scarcely be denied that the state of the law of this country is discreditable to us as a great and enlightened people. Partly written, partly unwritten, that part of our law which is unwritten, is to be gathered from the decisions and dicta of judges, dispersed over many hundred volumes of reports, or from the opinions of text writers, of various degrees of authority, contained in innumerable works; while the written law is scattered over thousands of statutes, strung together without any attempt at order or arrangement, and forming no less than forty ponderous volumes; the whole body of the law thus constituting a chaotic mass, to which the 'many camel-loads' of jurisprudence, of which the Roman jurists complained, hardly afford a parallel. A life of labour scarcely suffices to the professional lawyer to master, even imperfectly, this vast amount of legal learning; while to the body of the people, whose rights and duties are to be determined, and whose conduct is to be regulated by the law, that law is practically a sealed book.

The time is at length come for remedying, at least in part, this mighty grievance. Although it is still deemed too difficult a task to attempt to embody, in the more tangible form of writing, the floating rules of the unwritten law, we are called upon by the high authority of the Crown to devise means for reducing into shape and order the heterogeneous mass of written laws which now swell and encumber our Statute Book."

The Attorney General criticised the course of action proposed by the Commission, which recommended selecting particular sets or bundles of the statutes for consolidation, for not wholly digesting the statute book and for not expurgating the statute book of obsolete, spent, unnecessary or superseded enactments. The Attorney General proposed alternative aims to the Commission:

"1. To collect all statutes in force under appropriate heads, i.e., to consolidate.

2. To arrange these heads under the different branches into which the whole body of law divides itself, i.e., to digest.

3. To do this as a great, entire and comprehensive whole into a consolidated and digested body of statute law to be published at once."

To do so, the Attorney General proposed a plan of proceeding, which he suggested would be able to be done in twelve months:

1. To survey the whole body of the law under branches, divisions and subdivisions.
2. To set aside and omit statutes repealed expressly or by implication, or which have expired.
3. To present consolidating statutes to Parliament with a provision that all statutes not included be expressly repealed (with the exception of the Magna Carta and the Bill of Rights, seen as a "profanation" to repeal).

An alternative approach, focusing on expunging obsolete laws from the statute book, followed by consolidation, was proposed by Peter Locke King MP, who was heavily critical of the expenditure of the Commission and the lack of results. On 29 April 1856, Locke King introduced the Sleeping Statutes Bill, which implemented some recommendations for repeals made by the Commission. This led to the passing of the Repeal of Obsolete Statutes Act 1856 (19 & 20 Vict. c. 64), described by Halsbury's Laws, and Courtenay Ilbert, as the first act for statute law revision (in the sense of repealing enactments which are obsolete, spent, unnecessary or superseded, or which no longer serve a useful purpose).

In 1857 a Select Committee was appointed to consider the Commission's second report to improve the manner and language of current legislation. The Committee took evidence from Coulson, Ker, and Coode, but their proceedings were interrupted by the dissolution of Parliament before they had time to make a report.

In April 1859, the Attorney General, Sir Fitzroy Kelly, introduced a series of bills to consolidate the criminal law, which had been prepared by the Commission. The bills became Charles Greaves' Criminal Law Consolidation Acts 1861. Speaking in Parliament, Kelly said:

"A plan had been proposed to the Commission which had been to a considerable extent acted upon, and in accordance with which ninety-three Bills were then ready, or nearly ready, which would consolidate the whole of the criminal statute law, the whole of the mercantile statute law, and the whole of the real property statute law."

Pursuant to an order of the House of Lords dated 5 July 1859, the Register of Public General Acts, which had been prepared by the Commission and consisted of two volumes from 1800 to the end of 1858, was published.

On 18 July 1859, Robert Rolfe, 1st Baron Cranworth, drew attention to the Fourth Report of the Royal Commission for Consolidating the Statute Law, arguing that they had successfully catalogued and classified 6,887 statutes passed since the Union with Ireland, identifying 1,836 related to permanent rules of civil conduct. Cranworth proposed that the entire consolidation project could be completed within two years under the leadership of a dedicated senior barrister, effectively reducing the statute law to 300–400 consolidated acts contained in three to four volumes. To demonstrate the feasibility of consolidation, Cranworth introduced five sample Bills:

1. A Bill to Consolidate the Statute Law of England relating to Marriages (Marriages Bill)
2. A Bill to Consolidate the Laws relating to the Registration of Births, Deaths, and Marriages in England (Registration Acts Consolidation Bill)
3. A Bill to Consolidate the Statute Law of England relating to Bills of Exchange and Promissory Notes (Bills of Exchange and Promissory Notes Bill)
4. A Bill to Consolidate the Statute Law of England relating to Executors and Administrators, and the Distribution of the Personal Property of deceased Persons (Executors and Administrators, &c., Bill)
5. A Bill to Consolidate the Statute Law relating to Aliens (Aliens Bill).

==== Further Statute Law Revision Acts ====
Efforts at statute law revision attracted criticism over expenditure, commissioners' salaries, the order in which expurgation and consolidation should proceed, and the lack of results. An 1857 article in the Westminster Review singled out Charles Henry Bellenden Ker and argued that expurgation should precede consolidation. It reported the combined expense of the criminal law commissions of 1833 and 1845 as £49,716. In its broader criticism of public spending on commissions, it cited a Commons return of 1856 reporting expenditure of £768,438 on commissions of inquiry generally since 1830.

On 17 February 1860, the Attorney General, Sir Richard Bethell told the House of Commons that he had engaged Francis Savage Reilly and Arthur John Wood to expurgate the statute book of all acts which, though not expressly repealed, were not in force, working backwards from the present time.

This led to the passing of the Statute Law Revision Act 1861 (24 & 25 Vict. c. 101), which Ilbert described as clearing away 900 obsolete acts dating from 1770 to 1853, the Statute Law Revision Act 1863 (26 & 27 Vict. c. 125), which repealed enactments for England and Wales extending from the reign of Henry III to that of James II, and the Statute Law Revision Act 1867 (30 & 31 Vict. c. 59), which repealed over 1,300 statutes.

==== Law Commission ====
In 1965, the Law Commissions Act 1965 was passed, which established the Law Commission and Scottish Law Commission for England and Wales and Scotland, respectively.

In their First Programme on Consolidation and Statute Law Revision dated 17 November 1965 and published in January 1966, the Law Commission proposed "to embark on an immediate review of all statutes in chronological order with a view to recommending the repeal of all that cannot positively be shown to continue to perform a useful function".

In their First Programme of Consolidation and Statute Law Revision of the Scottish Law Commission published on 8 February 1966, the Scottish Law Commission proposed joining the review insofar as it covered statutes applying to Scotland and other parts of the United Kingdom. It considered a further review of pre-1707 acts of the Parliament of Scotland unnecessary in the immediate future, given the extensive work already undertaken, culminating in the Statute Law Revision (Scotland) Act 1964.

In its Statute Law Revision: First Report, published in May 1969, the Law Commission proposed repeals after consultation with the Scottish Law Commission. Proposals concerning forest law and the Crown's royal prerogative rights to wild creatures required substantive changes in the law. They were dealt with in the Commission's second report on statute law revision and implemented by the Wild Creatures and Forest Laws Act 1971.

In 1969, the Statute Law (Repeals) Act 1969 was passed, which implemented the recommendations contained in the Law Commission's first report on statute law revision.

In their Second Programme on Consolidation and Statute Law Revision published on 20 April 1971, the Law Commission noted that the Joint Committee had spent six days examining the proposals of its first report on statute law revision. The Commission confirmed their approach to propose the "repeal of enactments which are no longer of practical utility" and their desire for a "systematic search of the statute book... partly done in chronological order and partly by subject matter". The Commission also noted that not all statute law revision was done by Statute Law Revision Acts or Statute Law (Repeals) Acts, for example the Theft Act 1968 and the Courts Bill, subsequently the Courts Act 1971.

The Law Commission has also recommended statute law revision outside the scope of Statute Law Revision Acts or Statute Law (Repeals) Acts. For example, in their report Jurisdiction of Certain Ancient Courts: Draft Clause and Schedules, the commission recommended the curtailing of the jurisdiction of ancient courts, such as courts baron, courts leet and courts of pie poudre. These recommendations were effected by section 23 of, and schedule 4 to, the Administration of Justice Act 1977. Section 32(4) of, and part V of schedule 5 to, the 1977 act repealed three acts wholly and 25 acts partially relating to ancient courts.

In 1978, following ten years of statute law revision, the Law Commission prepared an internal working paper to evaluate previous efforts and determine future direction. The commission considered a number of processes including consolidation, statute law revision and codification. The approach was further refined in 1979 and 1980, although the annual report for 1979–1980 recorded that no report had yet been published.

On 2 December 1983, a Local Legislation Working Party was set up by the Statute Law Committee “to examine the problems of the local statute law in England and Wales and in Scotland, to report on the options for advancing the process of rationalising and reforming it and to make recommendations for consideration by the Statute Law Committee.” This effort coincided with work by the Law Commission to produce a Chronological Table of Local Legislation. Efforts were made by the Law Commission to produce a Statute Law (Repeals) Bill for the local legislation of South Yorkshire and Greater Manchester. By 1988, the project had expanded to include the City of Nottingham, Bedfordshire and Warwickshire. The recommendations for South Yorkshire were implemented in the Statute Law (Repeals) Act 1989. By 1992, work had expanded to include Gloucestershire, Hereford and Worcester, and Shropshire. The recommendations for Bedfordshire, Warwickshire, the county and city of Nottingham and the former Derwent Valley Water Board were unable to be implemented in the Statute Law (Repeals) Act 1993, and were implemented in the Statute Law (Repeals) Act 1995. The recommendations for Hereford and Worcester were implemented in the Statute Law (Repeals) Act 1998. In its annual report for 1999, the commission said that reduced resources meant that it did not anticipate substantial work on local or private acts for the foreseeable future.

In 1989, the Joint Committee on Consolidation Bills recommended that, whenever it is convenient to do so, proposals for the repeal of redundant statutory provisions should be incorporated in legislation dealing with the topic concerned. This led to the inclusion of repeals of obsolete enactments in the Courts and Legal Services Act 1990, the Planning (Consequential Provisions) Act 1990 and the Water Consolidation (Consequential Provisions) Act 1991.

The Statute Law (Repeals) Act 1973 provided a mechanism to extend specified repeals to the Isle of Man by Order in Council. In 1991, the Statute Law Revision (Isle of Man) Act 1991 applied specified earlier repeals to the island, addressing the survival there of statutes already repealed for the United Kingdom.

By 2008, the Law Commission referred to the team as the Statute Law Repeals Team.

=== Preparation etc. of revised editions of the statutes ===
Owen Hood Phillips defined statute law revision as "the reprinting of statute law with the omission of obsolete matter".

Legislation.gov.uk uses the terms "revise", "revised" and "revision" to refer to the editorial process of incorporating amendments and carrying through other effects into legislation.

=== Repeal of obsolete enactments ===
The Law Commission said that statute law revision originally referred to the repeal of enactments which had become inoperative, in order to facilitate the preparation of a revised edition of the statutes. They said that they intended to adopt a more forceful approach by also repealing enactments which no longer served a substantial purpose, and that they hoped that this would also facilitate consolidation.

=== Duty to prepare programmes of statute law revision ===
It is the duty of the Law Commission to prepare from time to time at the request of the Lord Chancellor comprehensive programmes of statute law revision, and to undertake the preparation of draft Bills pursuant to any such programme approved by the Lord Chancellor.

It is the duty of the Scottish Law Commission to prepare from time to time at the request of the Scottish Ministers comprehensive programmes of statute law revision, and to undertake the preparation of draft Bills pursuant to any such programme approved by the Scottish Ministers.

=== What legislation effects statute law revision ===
In 1971, the Law Commission said that not all statute law revision was being done by Statute Law Revision Bills or Statute Law (Repeals) Bills. They said that an example of this was the statute law revision effected by the Theft Act 1968.

== Ireland ==
In the law of the Republic of Ireland, the Law Reform Commission (LRC) is involved in several types of statute law revision: consolidation of dispersed statutes, repeal of dead statutes, and "restatement" (publication of revised, current versions) of amended statutes. As regards consolidation and repeal, the LRC only makes recommendations, which are implemented by act of the Oireachtas (parliament). The LRC's remit under the Law Reform Commission Act 1975 is to make proposals for law reform, defined as "its development, its codification (including in particular its simplification and modernisation) and the revision and consolidation of statute law". The Statute Law (Restatement) Act 2002, modelled on the schemes in New South Wales and Queensland, empowers the Attorney General to authorise official restatements, which do not have force of law but are prima facie evidence of the state of the law. After four pilot restatements, responsibility for restatements was transferred from the Attorney General's office to the LRC in 2006. The Attorney General's electronic Irish Statute Book (eISB) includes the text of all statutes as enacted, each of which links to the LRC's corresponding revised version where available; as of 12 April 2021 the LRC has restated 408 acts and two statutory instruments. Repeal of dead statutes falls under the Statute Law Revision Programme, begun in 2003 in the Attorney General's office, transferred in 2012 to the Department of Public Expenditure and Reform, and retransferred in 2020 to the LRC.

== See also ==
- Law Reform Act
- Statute Law Revision Act
- Statute Law (Repeals) Act
