= Statute Law Revision Act 1893 =

Act of the Parliament of the United Kingdom

Statute Law Revision Act 1893 (Note: Section 4.)
- Act of Parliament
- Parliament of the United Kingdom
- Long title: An Act for further promoting the Revision of the Statute Law by repealing Enactments which have ceased to be in force or have become unnecessary.
- Citation: 56 & 57 Vict. c. 14
- Introduced by: Farrer Herschell, 1st Baron Herschell (Lords)
- Territorial extent: United Kingdom

Dates
- Royal assent: 9 June 1893
- Commencement: 9 June 1893 (Note: The Acts of Parliament (Commencement) Act 1793.)
Other legislation
Amends	See § Repealed enactments
Repeals/revokes	See § Repealed enactments
Amended by	Statute Law Revision Act 1908; Courts Act 1971; Administration of Justice Act 1977; Statute Law (Repeals) Act 1998
Relates to	Repeal of Obsolete Statutes Act 1856; See Statute Law Revision Act

Status: Partially repealed

History of passage through Parliament

Records of Parliamentary debate relating to the statute from Hansard

Text of statute as originally enacted

The Statute Law Revision Act 1893 (56 & 57 Vict. c. 14) is an act of the Parliament of the United Kingdom that repealed various United Kingdom enactments from 1837 to 1868 which had ceased to be in force or had become necessary. The act was intended, in particular, to facilitate the preparation of the new edition of the revised edition of the statutes, then in progress.

Cotton said the act is the twenty-second Statute Law Revision Act. The act was the first to be referred to the Joint Committee for consideration of Statute Law Revision Bills.

Section 3 of the Statute Law Revision Act 1898 (61 & 62 Vict. c. 22) provided that the second part of the schedule to that act was to be substituted for so much of this act as related to the Record of Title Act (Ireland) 1865 (28 & 29 Vict. c. 88), and that this act was to be read and construed as if the part so substituted had originally been enacted as part of this act.

== Background ==
In the United Kingdom, acts of Parliament remain in force until expressly repealed. Blackstone's Commentaries on the Laws of England, published in the late 18th-century, raised questions about the system and structure of the common law and the poor drafting and disorder of the existing statute book.

In 1806, the Commission on Public Records passed a resolution requesting the production of a report on the best mode of reducing the volume of the statute book. From 1810 to 1825, The Statutes of the Realm was published, providing for the first time the authoritative collection of acts. In 1816, both Houses of Parliament, passed resolutions that an eminent lawyer with 20 clerks be commissioned to make a digest of the statutes, which was declared "very expedient to be done." However, this was never done.

At the start of the parliamentary session in 1853, Lord Cranworth announced his intention to the improvement of the statute law and in March 1853, appointed the Board for the Revision of the Statute Law to repeal expired statutes and continue consolidation, with a wider remit that included civil law. The Board issued three reports, recommending the creation of a permanent body for statute law reform.

In 1854, Lord Cranworth appointed the Royal Commission for Consolidating the Statute Law to consolidate existing statutes and enactments of English law. The commission made four reports.

An alternative approach, focusing on expunging obsolete laws from the statute book, followed by consolidation, was proposed by Peter Locke King MP, who was heavily critical of the expenditure of the commission and the lack of results. This approach was taken by the Repeal of Obsolete Statutes Act 1856 (19 & 20 Vict. c. 64), considered to be the first Statute Law Revision Act.

On 17 February 1860, the Attorney General, Sir Richard Bethell told the House of Commons that he had engaged Sir Francis Reilly and A. J. Wood to expurgate the statute book of all acts which, though not expressly repealed, were not in force, working backwards from the present time.

Previous Acts
Year passed	Title	Citation	Effect
1861	Statute Law Revision Act 1861	24 & 25 Vict. c. 101	Repealed or amended over 800 enactments
1863	Statute Law Revision Act 1863	26 & 27 Vict. c. 125	Repealed or amended over 1,600 enactments for England and Wales
1867	Statute Law Revision Act 1867	30 & 31 Vict. c. 59	Repealed or amended over 1,380 enactments
1870	Statute Law Revision Act 1870	33 & 34 Vict. c. 69	Repealed or amended over 250 enactments
1871	Promissory Oaths Act 1871	34 & 35 Vict. c. 48	Repealed or amended almost 200 enactments
1871	Statute Law Revision Act 1871	34 & 35 Vict. c. 116	Repealed or amended over 1,060 enactments
1872	Statute Law Revision Act 1872	35 & 36 Vict. c. 63	Repealed or amended almost 490 enactments
1872	Statute Law (Ireland) Revision Act 1872	35 & 36 Vict. c. 98	Repealed or amended over 1,050 enactments
1872	Statute Law Revision Act 1872 (No. 2)	35 & 36 Vict. c. 97	Repealed or amended almost 260 enactments
1873	Statute Law Revision Act 1873	36 & 37 Vict. c. 91	Repealed or amended 1,225 enactments
1874	Statute Law Revision Act 1874	37 & 38 Vict. c. 35	Repealed or amended over 490 enactments
1874	Statute Law Revision Act 1874 (No. 2)	37 & 38 Vict. c. 96	Repealed or amended almost 470 enactments
1875	Statute Law Revision Act 1875	38 & 39 Vict. c. 66	Repealed or amended over 1,400 enactments
1876	Statute Law Revision (Substituted Enactments) Act 1876	39 & 40 Vict. c. 20	Updated references to repealed acts
1878	Statute Law Revision (Ireland) Act 1878	41 & 42 Vict. c. 57	Repealed or amended over 460 enactments passed by the Parliament of Ireland
1878	Statute Law Revision Act 1878	41 & 42 Vict. c. 79	Repealed or amended over 90 enactments.
1879	Statute Law Revision (Ireland) Act 1879	42 & 43 Vict. c. 24	Repealed or amended over 460 enactments passed by the Parliament of Ireland
1879	Civil Procedure Acts Repeal Act 1879	42 & 43 Vict. c. 59	Repealed or amended over 130 enactments
1881	Statute Law Revision and Civil Procedure Act 1881	44 & 45 Vict. c. 59	Repealed or amended or amended almost 100 enactments relating to civil procedure.
1883	Statute Law Revision Act 1883	46 & 47 Vict. c. 39	Repealed or amended over 475 enactments
1883	Statute Law Revision and Civil Procedure Act 1883	46 & 47 Vict. c. 49	Repealed or amended over 475 enactments
1887	Statute Law Revision Act 1887	50 & 51 Vict. c. 59	Repealed or amended over 200 enactments
1887	Sheriffs Act 1887	50 & 51 Vict. c. 55	Repealed or amended almost 75 enactments related to sheriffs
1887	Coroners Act 1887	50 & 51 Vict. c. 71	Repealed or amended over 30 enactments related to coroners
1888	Statute Law Revision Act 1888	51 & 52 Vict. c. 3	Repealed or amended 620 enactments
1889	Master and Servant Act 1889	52 & 53 Vict. c. 24	Repealed or amended over 20 enactments related to master and servants
1888	Statute Law Revision (No. 2) Act 1888	51 & 52 Vict. c. 57	Repealed or amended ? enactments
1890	Statute Law Revision Act 1890	53 & 54 Vict. c. 33	Repealed or amended ? enactments
1890	Statute Law Revision (No. 2) Act 1890	53 & 54 Vict. c. 51	Repealed or amended ? enactments
1891	Statute Law Revision Act 1891	54 & 55 Vict. c. 67	Repealed or amended ? enactments
1892	Statute Law Revision Act 1892	55 & 56 Vict. c. 19	Repealed or amended ? enactments

== Passage ==
The Statute Law Revision (No. 1) Bill had its first reading in the House of Lords on 6 February 1893, presented by the Lord Chancellor, Farrer Herschell, 1st Baron Herschell. The bill had its second reading in the House of Lords on 27 February 1893, introduced by the Lord Chancellor, and committed to a joint committee. The bill was referred to the Joint Committee for consideration of Statute Law Revision Bills, which reported on 23 March 1893, with amendments. The amended bill was recommitted to a committee of the whole house, which met and reported on 24 March 1893, with amendments. The amended bill had its third reading in the House of Lords on 24 March 1893 and passed, without amendments

The bill had its first reading in the House of Commons on 27 March 1893. The bill had its second reading in the House of Commons on 2 June 1893 and was committed to a committee of the whole house, which met and reported on 2 June 1893, without amendments. The bill had its third reading in the House of Commons on 2 June 1893 and passed, without amendments.

The bill was granted royal assent on 9 June 1893.

== Legacy ==
=== Amendments to schedule ===
This schedule was repealed by section 1 of, and the schedule to, the Statute Law Revision Act 1908 (8 Edw. 7. c. 49). However, the proviso to section 1 of that act provided that the schedule was not repealed so far as the schedule was in force in any part of His Majesty's dominions outside the United Kingdom.

Accordingly, it did not repeal, as to His Majesty's dominions outside the United Kingdom, much of this schedule as related to the New Zealand Constitution Act 1852 (15 & 16 Vict. c. 72), the Act 25 & 26 Vict. c. 48, the Act 27 & 28 Vict. c. 77, the Indian High Courts Act 1865 (28 & 29 Vict. c. 15), the India Military Funds Act 1866 (29 & 30 Vict. c. 18), the Act 29 & 30 Vict. c. 74, the British North America Act 1867 (30 & 31 Vict. c. 3) and the Act 31 & 32 Vict. c. 57.

The effect of the act is that the schedule is repealed in the Republic of Ireland.

Section 15 of the Naval Discipline Act 1915 (5 & 6 Geo. 5. c. 30) provided that so much of the schedule as related to the preamble to, and part of section 86 of, the Naval Discipline Act (29 & 30 Vict. c. 109) was to cease to have, and was to be deemed never to have had, effect.

=== Provisions of schedule relating to Canada ===
The schedule repealed, as to all Her Majesty's Dominions, the following enactments of the British North America Act 1867 (30 & 31 Vict. c. 3):

- Sections 2, 25, 42, 43, 81, 89, 127 and 145
- The words from "Be it therefore" to "same as follows";
- Section 4 to "provisions", where it last occurred;
- In section 51, the words from "of the census" to "seventy-one and" and the word "subsequent".
- In Section 88, the words from "and the House" to the end.

The Bill for the act says the ground of repeal was "As to Crown, see Interp. Act. Rest spent". The words "As to Crown, see Interp. Act." refer to section 30 of the Interpretation Act 1889. The provisions of the schedule which relate to Canada consist of those which repeal parts of the British North America Act 1867 (30 & 31 Vict. c. 3). The provisions of the schedule which repeal parts of the British North America Act 1867 (30 & 31 Vict. c. 3) were not repealed, as to His Majesty's dominions out of the United Kingdom, by the Statute Law Revision Act 1908 (8 Edw. 7. c. 49).

In 1936, these repeals were not known to all Canadians; and in 1942, they were described as forgotten.

=== Effect of repeals ===
As to the construction of the act, see Cairney v Wright (1908).

As to the repeal of section 60 of the Landlord and Tenant Law Amendment (Ireland) Act 1860 (23 & 24 Vict. c. 154), also known as Deasy's Act, see Burton v Brady and Doyle v Paterson and McCarthy'.

According to Edwin Adam, in Stirling v Dickson (1900), the Lord Justice General, and Lords Adam and M'Laren, sitting in the High Court of Justiciary, in a suspension, held that in view of the provisions of sections 3(2) and 6 of the Summary Procedure (Scotland) Act 1864 (27 & 28 Vict. c. 53), the repeal of section 18 of the Public Houses Acts Amendment Act 1862 (25 & 26 Vict. c. 35) by the act did not make it necessary to revert to the six days induciae provided by section 23 of the Licensing (Scotland) Act 1828 (9 Geo. 4. c. 58), sometimes called the Home Drummond Act.

== Subsequent developments ==
The words "to the court of the county palatine of Lancaster or" of section 2 of the act were repealed by section 56(4) of, and part II of schedule 11 to, the Courts Act 1971, which came into force on 1 January 1972.

Section 2 of the act was repealed by section 32(4) of, and part V of schedule 5 to, the Administration of Justice Act 1977, which came into force on 29 July 1977.

Section 4(1) of Imperial Laws Application Act 1988 (No 112) provides that the act is not part of the laws of New Zealand.

The enactments which were repealed (whether for the whole or any part of the United Kingdom) by the act were repealed so far as they extended to the Isle of Man by section 1(1) of, and schedule 1 to, the Statute Law Revision (Isle of Man) Act 1991, which came into force on 25 July 1991.

Section 1 of the act was repealed by section 1(1) of, and group 1 of part IX of schedule 1 to, the Statute Law (Repeals) Act 1998, which came into force on 19 November 1998.

The act was retained for the Republic of Ireland by section 2(2)(a) of, and part 4 of schedule 1 to, the Statute Law Revision Act 2007, which came into force on 8 May 2007.

The act was partly in force in Great Britain at the end of 2010.

== Repealed enactments ==
Section 1 of the act repealed 530 enactments, listed in the schedule to the act, across six categories: (Note: The Note of the bill, unlike the schedule, gives commentary on each act, noting any earlier repeals and the reason for the new repeal.)

- Expired
- Spent
- Repealed in general terms
- Virtually repealed
- Superseded
- Obsolete

Section 1 of the act also provided that parts of titles, preambles, or recitals specified after the words "In part, namely" in connection with acts mentioned in the first schedule to the act could be omitted from any revised edition of the statutes published by authority, with brief statements about the acts, officers, persons, and things mentioned in those titles/preambles/recitals being added as necessary.

Section 1 of the act provided that repeals were subject to the standard Westbury Saving.

Section 2 of the act provided that if any repealed enactment had been applied to the Court of the County Palatine of Lancaster or other inferior civil courts, such enactment would be construed as if it were contained in a local and personal act specifically relating to that court, and would have effect accordingly.

Section 3 of the act provided that where any act cites or refers to another act otherwise than by its short title, the short title may, in any revised edition of the statutes printed by authority, be printed in substitution for such citation or reference.

The act contains, in the schedule, repeals of 530 enactments. The earliest act dealt with is the Dublin Police Act 1837 (7 Will 4 & 1 Vict c 25). The latest Act dealt with is the Colonial Shipping Act 1868 (31 & 32 Vict c 129).

The schedule repealed, as to all Her Majesty's Dominions, the whole of the acts 25 & 26 Vict. c. 48 (Note: Sometimes called the New Zealand Constitution Act 1862 or the Government of Provinces Act 1862) and 31 & 32 Vict. c. 57, (Note: Sometimes called the New Zealand (Legislative Council) Act (1868) or the Legislative Council, New Zealand Act 1868.) and parts of the New Zealand Constitution Act 1852 (15 & 16 Vict. c. 72), the Act 27 & 28 Vict. c. 77, (Note: Sometimes called the Ionian States Act, or the Ionian States Act of Parliament Repeal Act 1864.) the Indian High Courts Act 1865 (28 & 29 Vict. c. 15), the India Military Funds Act 1866 (29 & 30 Vict. c. 18), the Act 29 & 30 Vict. c. 74, (Note: Sometimes called the New South Wales and Van Diemen's Land Government Act (1866)) and the British North America Act 1867 (30 & 31 Vict. c. 3).

== See also ==
- Statute Law Revision Act
- Statute Law Revision Act 1893 (Canada)

== Bibliography ==
- "The Statute Law Revision Act, 1893". Halsbury's Statutes of England. Second Edition. Butterworth & Co (Publishers) Ltd. Bell Yard, Temple Bar, London. 1950. Volume 24. Pages 237 and 238. See also pages 131, 186 to 188, 227, 242, 452, 453, 856, 858, 965, 975, 982, 985, 986 and 988.
- "The Statute Law Revision Act, 1893". Halsbury's Statutes of England. (The Complete Statutes of England). First Edition. Butterworth & Co (Publishers) Ltd. Bell Yard, Temple Bar, London. 1930. Volume 18: . Pages 1013 and 1014. See also pages 119, 127, 132 to 134 and 972 to 974.
- Joseph Sutherland Cotton. "Statute Law Revision Act, 1893". The Practical Statutes of the Session 1893. Pages 37 to 80.
- "The Statute Law Revision Act, 1893", N-W Provinces and Oudh Gazette, Part 1, 12 August 1893, pp 814 & 815.
- (1899) 107 The Law Times 56 (20 May 1899)
- (1893) 95 The Law Times 264 and 265 (22 July 1893)
- (1893) 96 The Law Times 2 and 3 (4 November 1893)
- (1893) 28 The Law Journal 104 (11 February 1893)
- "Some Curiosities of Statute Law Revision" (1898) 32 Irish Law Times and Solicitors' Journal 120 (12 March 1898)
- "The Legislation of the Past Session - I" (1894) 28 Irish Law Times and Solicitors' Journal 191 at 192 (14 April 1894)
- "The Statute Law Revision Bill" (1893) 37 The Solicitors' Journal 301 (4 March 1893)
- "Merchant Shipping" (1893) 37 The Solicitors' Journal 756 (16 September 1893)
- "Statute Law Revision Act, 1893" (1893) 12 Law Notes 298 (October 1893)
- "56 & 57 Vict c 14" (1893) 15 Law Students' Journal 196 (1 September 1893)
- Wylie. Irish Landlord and Tenant Acts. 2015. pp 97, 103 & 122
