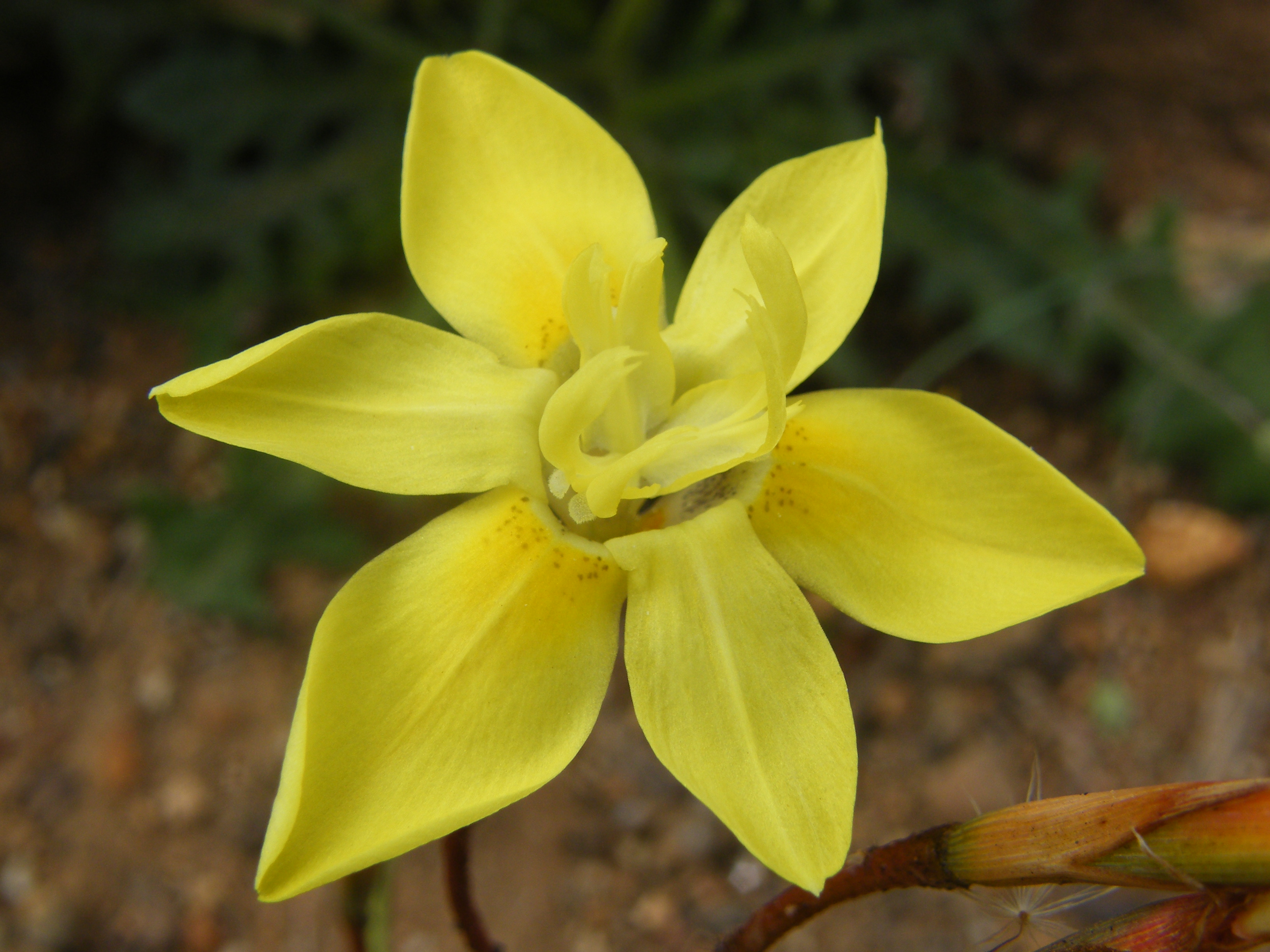

Scientific classification
- Kingdom: Plantae
- Clade: Tracheophytes
- Clade: Angiosperms
- Clade: Monocots
- Order: Asparagales
- Family: Iridaceae
- Genus: Moraea
- Species: M. bituminosa

Binomial name
- Moraea bituminosa (L.f.) Ker Gawl.

= Moraea bituminosa =

Species of flowering plant

Moraea bituminosa is a species of the genus Moraea in family Iridaceae.

It is a cormous geophyte 25 – 30 cm high with two leaves. The plant is sticky to the touch. Flowers are yellow with deep yellow nectar guides. The outer tepals are 22–32 mm long and inner tepals are 20 to 29 mm long.

It flowers from October to December with flowers opening in the afternoon. It is endemic to the Western Cape, from Bredasdorp in the south-east to Wellington and Tulbagh in the north, on stony sandstone slopes. It was first described by Carolus Linnaeus the Younger in 1782 as Iris bituminosa. In 1805, John Bellenden Ker Gawler moved this species to its current name, Moraea bituminosa.
