= Board for the Revision of the Statute Law =

Parliamentary body for statute law reform (1853–4)

Royal Commission overview
- Formed: 11 March 1853
- Preceding Royal Commission: Royal Commission on Revising and Consolidating the Criminal Law
- Dissolved: 2 June 1854
- Superseding Royal Commission: Royal Commission for Consolidating the Statute Law
- Jurisdiction: England and Wales
- Royal Commission executives: Charles Henry Bellenden Ker, Commissioner; George Coode, Sub-Commissioner; Thomas Chisholm Anstey, Sub-Commissioner; Matthew Brickdale, Sub-Commissioner; William Rogers, Sub-Commissioner
- Key documents: First Report (18 August 1853); Second Report (31 January 1854); Third Report (2 June 1854)

The Board for the Revision of the Statute Law (also known as the Statute Law Board or the Board for the Consolidation of the Statute Laws) was a commission from 1853 to 1854 to consolidate a significant portion of the statute law of the United Kingdom.

The Board issued three reports and was superseded by the Statute Law Commission of 1854.

== Background ==
In the United Kingdom, Acts of Parliament remain in force until expressly repealed. Blackstone's Commentaries on the Laws of England, published in the late 18th century, raised questions about the system and structure of the common law and the poor drafting and disorder of the existing statute book. By the start of the 19th century, it was widely recognised that the criminal law stood in need of the greatest reform.

In 1806 the Commission on Public Records passed a resolution requesting the production of a report on the best mode of reducing the volume of the statute book. From 1810 to 1825, The Statutes of the Realm was published, providing for the first time the authoritative collection of acts. In 1816, both Houses of Parliament, passed resolutions that an eminent lawyer with 20 clerks be commissioned to make a digest of the statutes, which was declared "very expedient to be done." However, this was never done.

The Royal Commission on the Criminal Law was established in 1833 and issued its final report in 1845, proposing a draft bill digesting criminal law and procedure. However, the ambition for such a comprehensive legal was dissipating. Lord Brougham introduced a bill embodying the digest, but it was withdrawn on an undertaking by Brougham's opponent, Lord Lyndhurst, that a second Commission would be appointed to revise it.

The Royal Commission on Revising and Consolidating the Criminal Law was established in 1845 and issued its final report in 1849. In autumn of 1852, the Lord Chancellor, Edward Sugden, 1st Baron St Leonards, directed James John Lonsdale and Charles Greaves to prepare Bills for the codification of criminal law based on the reports of the Criminal Law Commissioners. Two major Bills based on the work of the Commission covering offences against the person and larceny were introduced in 1853 and continued under Lord Cranworth. The bills made no progress, principally because of the unanimously unfavourable judicial reaction to the prospect of the common law being embodied in statutory form.

At the start of the parliamentary session in 1853, the Lord Chancellor, Robert Rolfe, 1st Baron Cranworth announced his intention to the improvement of the statute law.

On 28 February 1853 Lord Cranworth wrote to the Chancellor of the Exchequer, William Gladstone, requesting authorisation to employ Charles Henry Bellenden Ker as Commissioner for £1,000 a year and four barristers as Sub-Commissioners for £600 a year. This request was granted on 7 March 1853.

== Terms of reference ==
The Board was appointed by the Lord Chancellor, Lord Cranworth, on 11 March 1853, with work expected to begin from April 1853. The Board's terms of reference were:

1. The revision of the Statute Book by the expurgation of defunct Acts
2. The consolidation of statutes in actual operation.

The Board consisted of barristers and law reformers, to serve for one year:

- Charles Henry Bellenden Ker, Commissioner
- George Coode, Sub-Commissioner
- Thomas Chisholm Anstey, Sub-Commissioner
- Matthew Brickdale, Sub-Commissioner
- William Rogers, Sub-Commissioner

== Proceedings ==
The Commissioners were tasked with identifying which statutes remained to be consolidated, focusing on general or public statutes still in force, rather than repealed, obsolete, or temporary laws.

The Board met for the first time on 2 April 1853. The Board made three reports dated 18 August 1853, 31 January 1854 and 2 June 1854. The Commissioners found that, out of 16,442 public statutes passed since Magna Carta, only about 3,900 were still in force. After excluding Scotland-only, Ireland-only, and colonial statutes, less than 2,500 public statutes applicable to England and the UK remained.

=== First report ===
The Board issued its first report to the Lord Chancellor on 12 August 1853, laid before the House of Lords and ordered to be printed on 18 August 1853. The report was re-printed on 12 June 1854 as a return dated 31 January 1854 to an address of the House of Commons dated 20 August 1853.

The report consisted mainly of papers by the Sub-Commissioners, including practical suggestions from George Coode, a classification of existing statutes, an expurgatory list of defunct statutes from Thomas Chisholm Anstey and commentary on the law of distress from Matthew Brickdale. Constrained by time, Thomas Chisholm Anstey abandoned work to produce a digest of the law relating to insurance.

The Board employed several approaches to assess the state of existing laws. Chisholm Anstey and Rogers conducted a comprehensive review of statutes from the earliest records, identifying those that were obsolete, expired, or repealed (explicitly or virtually) and by 20 May 1853 had produced expurgatory list of statutes of 10,047 acts, or about two-thirds of the entire number of public general acts.

Type	Number
Public general acts	16,442
Local and personal acts	9,058
Private acts	14,233

Of the public general acts, 2,498 remained in force for England and Wales.

Type	Number
Acts repealed	2,707
Acts virtually repealed	2,617
Acts obsolete	436
Acts expired or virtually expired	4,287
Acts relating exclusively to Scotland	419
Acts relating exclusively to Ireland	610
Acts relating exclusively to the Colonies	400
Acts of a merely local or personal	2,468
Total	13,944

Chisholm Anstey and Rogers divided these acts into eight divisions:

1. Crown
2. Parliament
3. Finance
4. Public Economy
5. Rights of Private Persons
6. Administration of Civil Justice
7. Criminal Law and the Administration of Criminal Justice
8. Religion

In parallel, Coode cross-checked this list by beginning with statutes most recently passed. Coode published a specimen chronological register for the session ending in 1855 (18 & 19 Vict.) and publishing a completed register, to be revised after the end of each parliamentary session. Coode further suggested the publication of an expurgated and collated copy of the Statutes at Large, for which he obtained an estimate of £720l for the printing of 1,000 copies by the Queen's Printer. Coode also prepared a digest of the law relating to the poor.

In addition to reviewing and revising the expurgatory list, Brickdale experimented with different methods of legal codification, using distress for rent as a sample to produce a basic digest of the statute law, a digest of the whole statute and common law and a simplified and improved code of the law.

The Commissioners examined various efforts at statute law revision, both in the United Kingdom and internationally. Bellenden Ker endorsed the approach suggested by the 1835 Royal Commission for the Revision of the Statute Law, advocating for a declaratory law to remove obsolete statutes, the completion of an expurgatory list, and the gradual consolidation of laws by subject. He recommended an approach similar to that undertaken in the State of New York and the State of Massachusetts, where statutes were first grouped by subject matter—such as public departments, excise, customs, and assessed taxes—before undertaking a comprehensive revision of the statute book.

Ker also proposed the establishment of a permanent board dedicated to continuous statute law revision and consolidation, building upon the success of the standing counsel to the Home Office, which had improved legislative drafting. Additionally, he commended the work of the Counsel to the Speaker of the House of Commons, particularly in overseeing the Clauses Consolidation Acts. These acts significantly streamlined legislative processes, reducing the length of private acts by over 100,000 folio pages, improving consistency, and ensuring a more uniform statutory framework.

=== Second report ===
The Board issued its second report to the Lord Chancellor on 27 January 1854, laid before the House of Lords and ordered to be printed on 31 January 1894. The report was re-printed on 12 June 1854 as a return dated 9 March 1854 to an address of the House of Commons dated 7 March 1854.

In it, Ker argued against the policy of statute law revision, instead suggesting the preparation of a number of consolidation bills.

"So far from its being any part of the duty of the legislature to pass a declaratory statute as to expired and defunct Acts, such a measure would at best be nugatory, and perhaps mischievous. Besides, such a statute, with its thousands of entries, would be impossible to pass"

=== Third report ===
The Board issued its third and final report on 2 June 1854, laid before the House of Lords and ordered to be printed on 2 June 1894.

In it, Bellenden Ker maintained his opinion in his second report and argued for a permanent Statute Law Board for:

1. The gradual consolidation or rewriting of statute law
2. Preparing or settling bills for the Government and such other parties as should choose to apply for them, and reporting on Bills referred to them
3. Watching Bills in their progress through the two Houses, and reporting on alterations which might appear to make the enactments inconsistent with themselves or with other branches of the law

Chisholm Anstey argued for a general expurgatory bill as preliminary work to consolidation, submitting drafts of Bills for consolidating enactments relating to the National Debt, the Consolidated Fund and certain public officers, and pensions, as well as a bill for the interpretation of enactments.

Brickdale submitted drafts of bills concerning wills and apportionment and a paper containing considerations on the propriety of extending the principles of the Consolidated Clauses Acts and interpretation clauses, amongst other things.

Rogers submitted a draft of a proposed Labour Act to consolidate enactments relating to employers and workers.

== Legacy ==
The work of the Board faced wide criticism from politicians, legal academics and commentators, who focused on the high expenditure of the committee, especially on the salary and motivations of the Commissioners and draftsmen, including Charles Henry Bellenden Ker, the proposed approach taken by the Board to proceed with consolidation before expurgation, and the lack of results to show for it.

=== Criticism for expenditure ===
The Board was criticised in Parliament for being referred to as a Board or Commission, despite not having official status as such. Edward Sugden, 1st Baron St Leonards argued expressed concern about this informal arrangement, suggesting it was not an appropriate way to approach such an important task of law reform.

On 20 March 1855, the House of Commons ordered that details and expenditures of all Criminal and Statute Law Commissions to be laid before the house, which were presented on 30 April 1855 and printed on 1 May 1855. On 1 May 1855, the House of Commons ordered that a list of draftsmen and their salaries/expenses be laid before the House, which were presented on 4 June 1855.

The Board incurred expenses of £3,690, which was subject to criticism by legal academics and commentators, and by politicians, including Peter King MP and George Hadfield MP as part of an 1869 resolution criticising the expensive process of legal revision that had taken place over 36 years, costing the country over £80,000 without yielding substantial results.

=== Other publications ===
The Commission prepared an expurgatory list, prepared by Thomas Chisholm Anstey a and George Coode, containing 10,047 acts (two-thirds of all public general acts from the statute book). The list was not intended to be published, although on14 December 1854, the House of Commons ordered the list to be laid before the house, which was presented on 23 January 1855 and printed on 29 January 1855.

On 25 January 1855, the House of Commons ordered that all papers and minutes of proceedings relating to the Board to be laid before the house, which was presented on 22 February 1855 and printed on 26 February 1855.

=== Subsequent Developments ===
On 19 June 1854, upon the motion of Peter Locke King MP, the House of Commons resolved that "it would greatly conduce to the improvement of the Statute Law of this Country, if the preparation of "a declaratory Bill, of which the said special and detailed Report shall form the groundwork," were no longer to be delayed, and that such Bill ought to be forthwith prepared, for the purpose of being laid before Parliament".

On 29 August 1854, the Board was superseded by the Royal Commission for Consolidating the Statute Law. Ker remained on the Commission and Brickdale as Secretary. Ker was the only paid member of the commission, receiving a salary of £1,000. Recommendations made by the commission were implemented by the Repeal of Obsolete Statutes Act 1856 (19 & 20 Vict. c. 64), the Statute Law Revision Act 1861 (24 & 25 Vict. c. 101) and subsequent Statute Law Revision Acts.

The Chronological Table of the Statutes, first published in 1870 and the sessional registers published in the third report (specimen) and the fourth reports (complete) of the Royal dated 11 June 1857 and 21 June 1859 respectively resembled the specimen chronological register published in the Board's first report dated 18 August 1853.
