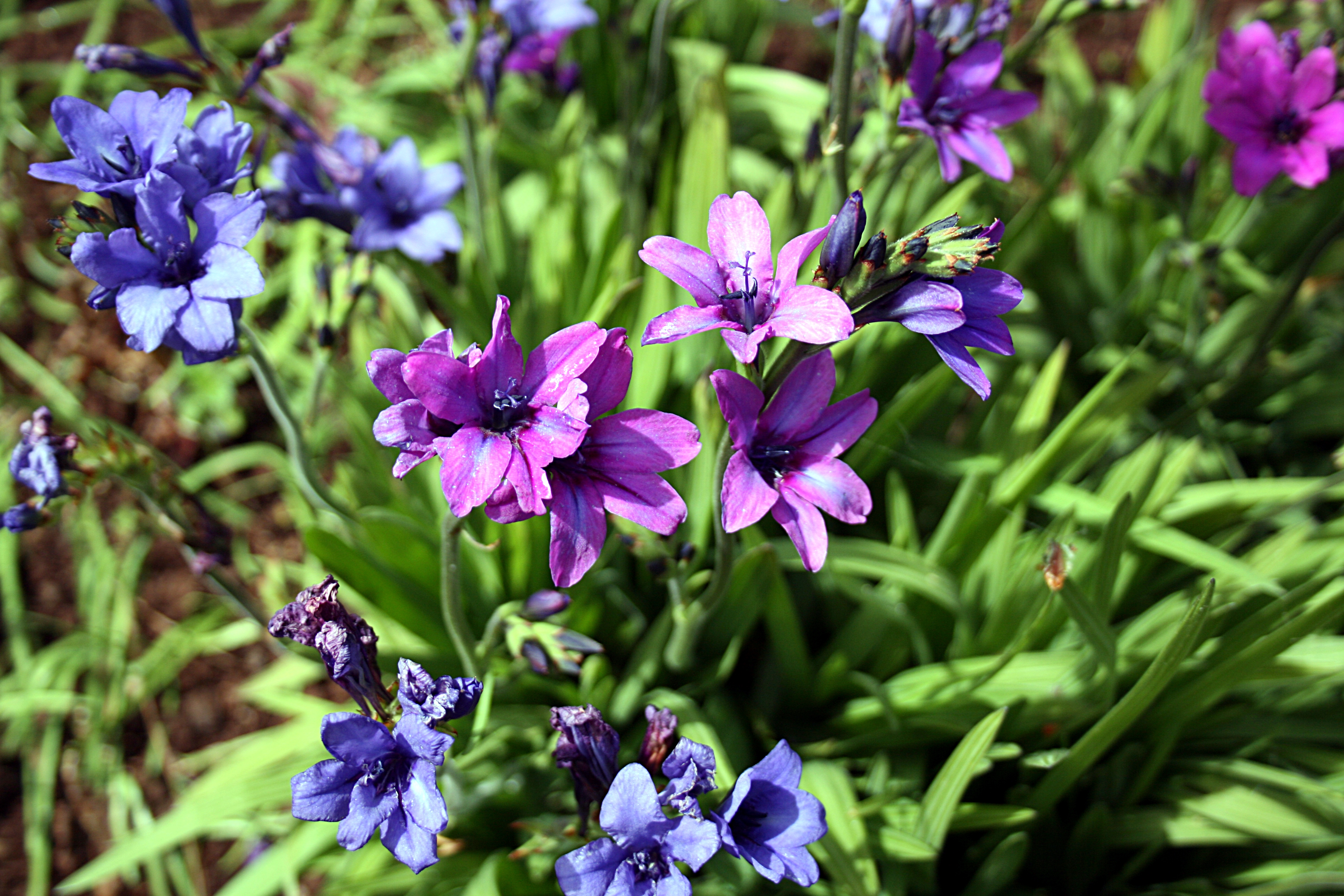

Scientific classification
- Kingdom: Plantae
- Clade: Tracheophytes
- Clade: Angiosperms
- Clade: Monocots
- Order: Asparagales
- Family: Iridaceae
- Genus: Babiana
- Species: B. stricta

Binomial name
- Babiana stricta (Aiton) Ker Gawl.

= Babiana stricta =

Species of flowering plant

Babiana stricta, the baboon flower or blue freesia, is a species of flowering plant in the family Iridaceae, native to Cape Province, South Africa and naturalized in Australia.

== Description ==
Growing 10–30 cm (4–12 in) tall by 5 cm (2 in) broad, it is a cormous perennial with hairy leaves 4–12 cm (2–5 in) long. The leaves show linear venation. It is a bulb-like plant that produces upright fans of pleated, slightly hairy, and sword-shaped 6 inch leaves. The leaves emerge in mid-winter and are followed by short spikes with blue or purple cup-shaped flowers in the spring. The flowers usually bloom for 3 or 4 weeks, after that, the leaves and flowers die.

The specific epithet stricta means "erect, upright".

== Cultivation ==
There are many hybrids and cultivars with different colored flowers, usually blue or pink with white additions. In mid- to late spring, each flowering stem produces six or more blooms, each to 5 cm (2 in) across. They are grouped in an inflorescence and often have a pleasant lemon scent. The seeds are black with a hard coat, collected in round seed capsules.

Babiana stricta is tender (USDA Zones 8–10) and in temperate zones is planted in containers and stored in winter at 5 °C (41 °F).

This plant has gained the Royal Horticultural Society's Award of Garden Merit.
