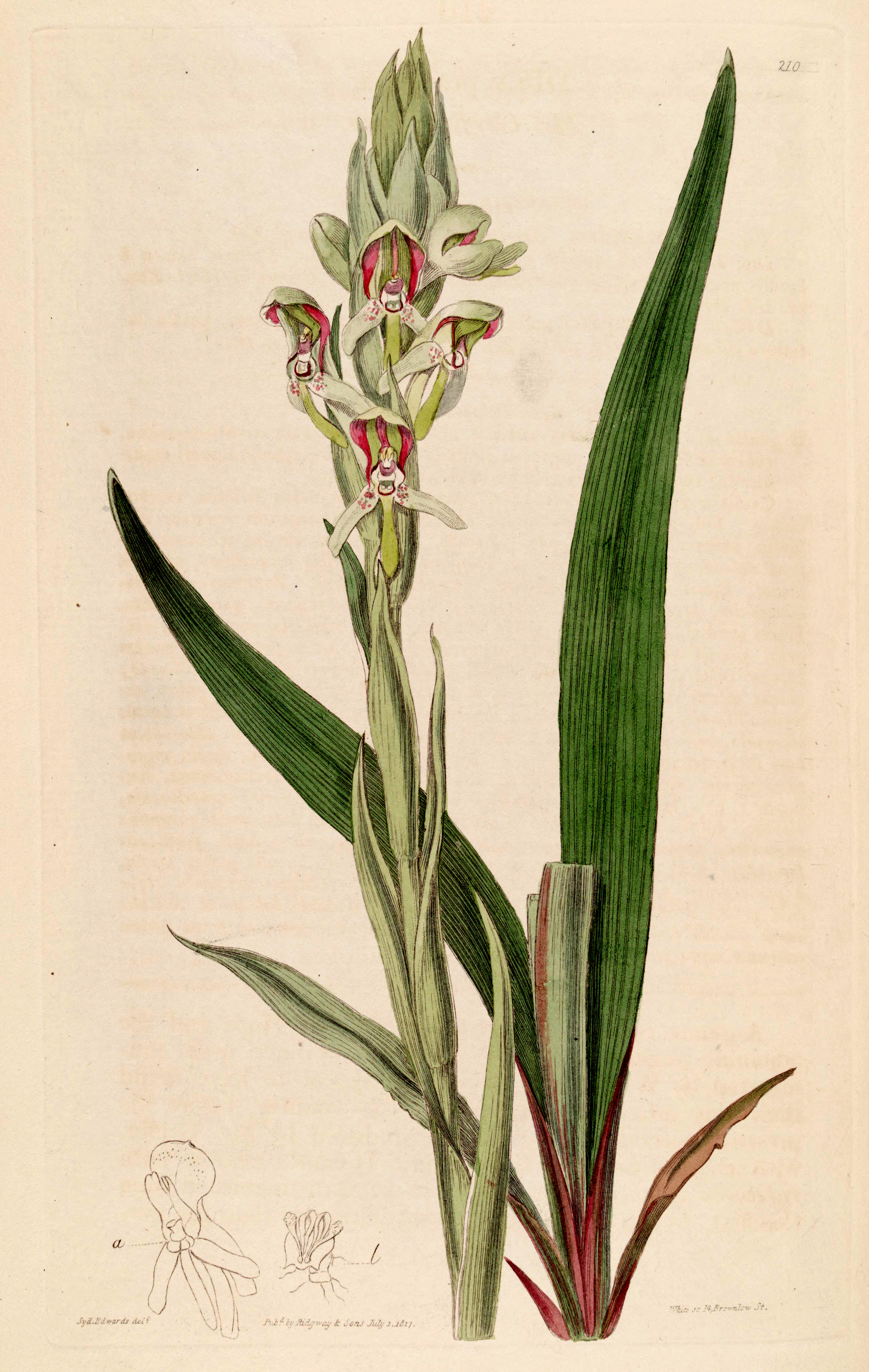

Scientific classification
- Kingdom: Plantae
- Clade: Tracheophytes
- Clade: Angiosperms
- Clade: Monocots
- Order: Asparagales
- Family: Orchidaceae
- Subfamily: Orchidoideae
- Genus: Disa
- Species: D. cernua

Binomial name
- Disa cernua (Thunb.) Sw.

Synonyms
- Satyrium cernuum Thunb. (Basionym); Disa physodes Thunb.; Disa prasinata Ker Gawl.; Monadenia prasinata (Ker Gawl.) Lindl.; Monadenia inflata Sond.; Monadenia cernua (Thunb.) T.Durand & Schinz

= Disa cernua =

Species of orchid

Disa cernua is a species of orchid found in South Africa, in Eastern Cape and Western Cape provinces.

Dependent on fire for flowering and growing in marshy locations, it is known from nine locations, and is listed as vulnerable due to habitat loss and alien plant invasion. Healthy populations exist in only three locations, of which only one, Cape Point, is formally protected.
