= Royal Commission for Consolidating the Statute Law =

Royal Commission for criminal and civil law reform (1854–1859)

Royal Commission overview
- Formed: 29 August 1854 (reappointed on 15 December 1854 and 6 February 1855)
- Preceding Royal Commission: Board for the Revision of the Statute Law
- Dissolved: 1 February 1859
- Jurisdiction: England and Wales
- Key documents: First Report (10 July 1855); Second Report (5 March 1856); Third Report (11 June 1857); Fourth Report (February 1859)

The Royal Commission for Consolidating the Statute Law (also known as the Statute Law Commission of 1854) was a royal commission from 1854 to 1859 for the purpose of consolidating existing statutes and enactments of the Statutes of the Realm of the United Kingdom.

== Background ==
In the United Kingdom, Acts of Parliament remain in force until expressly repealed. Blackstone's Commentaries on the Laws of England, published in the late 18th century, raised questions about the system and structure of the common law and the poor drafting and disorder of the existing statute book. By the start of the 19th century, it was widely recognised that the criminal law stood in need of the greatest reform.

In 1806, the Commission on Public Records passed a resolution requesting the production of a report on the best mode of reducing the volume of the statute book. From 1810 to 1825, The Statutes of the Realm were published, providing for the first time the authoritative collection of acts. In 1816, both Houses of Parliament passed resolutions that an eminent lawyer with twenty clerks be commissioned to make a digest of the statutes, which was declared "very expedient to be done." However, this was never done.

The Royal Commission on the Criminal Law was established in 1833 and issued its final report in 1845, proposing a draft bill digesting criminal law and procedure. However, the ambition for such a comprehensive legal reform was dissipating. Lord Brougham introduced a bill embodying the digest, but it was withdrawn on an undertaking by Brougham's opponent, Lord Lyndhurst, that a second Commission would be appointed to revise it.

The Royal Commission on Revising and Consolidating the Criminal Law was established in 1845 and issued its final report in 1849. In autumn of 1852, the Lord Chancellor, Edward Sugden, 1st Baron St Leonards, directed James John Lonsdale and Charles Greaves to prepare bills for the codification of criminal law based on the reports of the Criminal Law Commissioners. Two major bills based on the work of the Commission covering offences against the person and larceny were introduced in 1853 and continued under Lord Cranworth. The bills made no progress, principally because of the unanimously unfavourable judicial reaction to the prospect of the common law being embodied in statutory form.

At the start of the parliamentary session in 1853, Lord Cranworth announced his intention to work for the improvement of the statute law. In March 1853, he appointed the Board for the Revision of the Statute Law to repeal expired statutes and continue consolidation, with a wider remit that included civil law. The Board issued three reports, recommending the creation of a permanent body for statute law reform.

== Terms of reference ==
The Commission was appointed by letters patent dated 23 August 1854 "for the purpose of consolidating the Statutes of the Realm", including the common law, and to devise or suggest rules to "ensure simplicity or uniformity or any other improvement in the form and style of future statutes". The size of the Commission was increased by supplemental letters patent dated 15 December 1854 and 6 February 1855.

The Commission consisted of:

Name	Commentary
Lord Robert Rolfe, 1st Baron Cranworth	Lord Chancellor
Lord John Copley, 1st Baron Lyndhurst	Former Lord Chancellor
Lord Henry Brougham, 1st Baron Brougham and Vaux	Former Lord Chancellor
John Wrottesley, 2nd Baron Wrottesley	
John Campbell, 1st Baron Campbell	Chief Justice of the Queen's Bench
Sir John Jervis	Chief Justice of the Common Pleas
Sir Frederick Jonathan Pollock	Chief Baron of the Exchequer
Sir James Parke	Baron of the Exchequer, later 1st Baron Wensleydale
James Moncreiff	Lord Advocate, Scotland
Spencer Horatio Walpole	Member of the Privy Council
Joseph Napier	Member of the Privy Council
Sir William Page Wood	Vice-Chancellor of the High Court
Sir Alexander Cockburn	Attorney General for England and Wales
Sir Richard Bethell	Solicitor General for England and Wales
Abraham Brewster	Attorney-General for Ireland
William Keogh	Solicitor-General for Ireland
James Crawford	Solicitor General for Scotland, later Lord of Session
Charles Henry Bellenden Ker	Barrister-at-law
Walter Coulson	Appointed 15 December 1854
Matthew Talbot Baines	Appointed 6 February 1855
John David Fitzgerald	Appointed 6 February 1855
Edward Francis Maitland	Solicitor General for Scotland Appointed 6 February 1855
Sir Fitzroy Kelly	Barrister-at-law Appointed 6 February 1855

The barrister Matthew Brickdale was appointed Secretary to the Commission. Ker was the only paid member of the commission, receiving a salary of £1,000.

== Proceedings ==
The Commission first met on 13 November 1854, with apologies from the Lord Chancellor, Robert Rolfe, 1st Baron Cranworth. Following the Commission's next meeting on 15 November 1854, the Commissioners agreed to divide into sub-committees to superintend paid draftsmen in the consolidation of a particular branch of the statute law.

The Commission issued four reports dated 10 July 1855, 5 March 1856, 11 June 1857 and February 1859.

=== First report ===
The Commission issued its first report on 10 July 1855. Work undertaken focused on the production of several independent consolidation bills, rather than proposing a large overall scheme of change.

Bill	Commentary
Consolidation of the statutes relating to the national debt	Drafted by Thomas Chisholm Anstey
Consolidation of the statutes relating to masters and servants or workmen	Drafted by John Warrington Rogers, Solicitor General for Van Diemen's Land and a member of the original Board for the Revision of the Statute Law.
Consolidation of the statute criminal law	Drafted by James John Lonsdale, founded on the reports the Royal Commission on Revising and Consolidating the Criminal Law, assisted by J. F. Archbold, H. T. Holland, Mr. Edgar and R. Bourke
Consolidation of the stamp laws	Drafted by Henry Jessel
Consolidation of the statutes relating to bills of exchange and promissory notes	Drafted by John Warrington Rogers
Consolidation of the statutes relating to prisons	Drafted by Thomas Chisholm Anstey
Consolidation of the law of landlord and tenant	Drafted by Andrew Bisset
Consolidation of the statutes relating to ecclesiastical and collegiate leases	Drafted by George Wingrove Cooke
Bill to consolidate and amend the Copyhold Commissioners Acts	Drafted by George Wingrove Cooke at the request of the Copyhold Commissioners

The Commission observed difficulties in relation to the consolidation of the statutes, including:

1. Arrangement of materials. Statutes were a collection of amendments and additions to the general body of the unwritten common law, making systematic classification difficult.
2. Scientific vs. Practical Classification. A purely analytical classification, as proposed by jurists, would require disassembling and reorganising the entire statute book, which would not align with the practical needs of those who use the law, such as legal professionals and judges.
3. Need for Simultaneous Reform. Reorganising statute law into a new classification system would require all affected laws to be passed at once, which was seen as impractical given the legislative process.
4. Defining "Consolidation". While clear in simple cases, larger-scale consolidation presented challenges, particularly in deciding whether the process should merely restate existing laws or also introduce amendments.
5. Extent of Simplification and Amendment. Whether and to what extent simplifications and corrections of defects should be introduced.
6. Retention of Existing Wording. Retaining exact original language maintained consistency with judicial interpretations, but rewriting in a clearer form could help incorporate judicial decisions directly into the statutes.

The Commission concluded by observing that, which respect to current legislation:

"Perhaps nothing satisfactory towards the improvement of future legislation can be effected until either a board or some other persons are appointed, whose duty it shall be either to prepare or revise and report upon all Bills before they are brought into Parliament, and to watch them during their progress through the two Houses, either as officers of the Lord Chancellor or of some other Minister, or as officers of the two Houses of Parliament"

The report was laid on the table in the House of Commons on 13 July 1855. On 2 August 1855, the House of Commons ordered that copies of any replies received by the Commission in relation to No. 6 of the Appendix II of the report be laid on the table, which were presented on 7 August 1855 and printed on 8 August 1855.

=== Second report ===
Following the publication of the first report dated 10 July 1855, the Commission turned its attention "to devise and suggest such rules, if any, as might in our judgement tend to ensure simplicity or uniformity, or any other improvement, in the form and style of future Statues".

The Commission issued its second report on 5 March 1856. It recommended the adoption of two plans:

1. The appointment of an officer or board to revise and improve current legislation "to advise on the legal effect of every Bill which either House of Parliament should think fit to refer to them, and, in particular, on the existing state of the law affected by the proposed Bill, its language and structure, and its operation on the existing law; and also to point out what Statutes it repeals, alters, or modifies, and whether any Statutes or clauses of Statutes on the same subject-matter are left unrepealed or conflicting; so that the House may have at its command the materials which will enable it to deal properly with the Bill."
2. The adoption of a system of classification to the public general statutes across eleven illustrative classes: Army, Navy and Militia; Revenue and other Financial Acts; The United Kingdom; Great Britain; England and Ireland; England; Scotland; Ireland; Special and Local; Colonies; East India.

=== Third report ===
The Commission issued its third report on 11 June 1857. The Commissioners stated that they had given instructions for the preparation of a classification of statutes and a.

James Parke, 1st Baron Wensleydale, Sir John Jervis and Sir Fitzroy Kelly revised eight bills on the criminal law, originally drafted by J. J. Lonsdale, which were introduced at the end of the session of 1856 and would become the Criminal Law Consolidation Acts 1861. Instructions for the preparation of other bills were given, including mercantile law, the law of property, aliens and denizens, statutes of limitation, statutes relating to bridges, statutes rendering written documents necessary in certain cases, the marriage acts, statutes regulating weights and measures, statutes relating to libel, the law relating to insurance, the factory acts and statutes relating to insolvency

The Commissioners recommended the classification of the whole existing general statute law into four classes:

1. Historical statutes
2. Enactments which require to be re-written
3. Statutes standing alone, and not requiring consolidation
4. Statutes requiring consolidation

The Commissioners also gave instructions for a sessional register of statutes and produced a specimen for the session ending in 1837 (7 Will. 4 & 1 Vict.), developed by A. J. Wood (superintended), G. B. Lennard, Francis Reilly, and Alfred Wills, showing how far each statute was in force across thirteen classes:

- I. Armed Forces
- II. Revenue
- III. Financial
- IV. United Kingdom
- V. Great Britain
- VI. England and Ireland
- VII. England
- VIII. Scotland
- IX. Ireland
- X. Local and Special, subdivided into
  - A. Crown Lands
  - B. England
  - C. Scotland
  - D. Ireland
  - E. Miscellaneous
- XI. Colonies
- XII. East Indies
- XIII. Slave Trade

=== Fourth report ===
The Commission issued its fourth report in February 1859, printed on 11 July 1859 as a return to an address of the House of Commons dated 21 June 1859. The Commissioners stated that the register and classification had been completed from the time of the union with Ireland (41 Geo. 3. (U.K.) to the end of the session of 1858 (21 & 22 Vict.), across thirteen classes.

- I. Armed Forces
- II. Revenue
- III. Financial
- IV. Acts relating to the United Kingdom
- V. Acts relating to Great Britain
- VI. Acts relating to England and Ireland
- VII. Acts relating to England
- VIII. Acts relating to Scotland
- IX. Acts relating to Ireland
- X. Local and Special, subdivided with reference to their application to
  - A. Crown Lands
  - B. Parts of, or Institutions or Bodies in England
  - C. Parts of, or Institutions or Bodies in Scotland
  - D. Parts of, or Institutions or Bodies in Ireland
  - E. Miscellaneous; compromising Local and Special Acts not falling under any of the foregoing subdivisions of Class X
- XI. Acts relating to the Colonies
- XII. Acts relating to the East Indies
- XIII. Acts relating to the Suppression of the Slave Trade

The Commission submitted that the public general statutes since the year 1800, consisting of 6,887 statutes across twenty-three and a half quarto volumes averaging 1,000 pages each, could be reduced to 1,836 statutes across Class IV to IX, inclusive, across six quarto volumes.

Period	Acts not in operation	Acts in operation – Classes IV. to VII.	Acts in operation – other classes	Total number of acts
From the union to 60 Geo. 3. & 1 Geo. 4	1,927	192	571	2,690
The reign of Geo. 4	614	148	343	1,105
The reign of Will. 4	279	187	242	708
The reign of Her Majesty (Vict.)	696	674	1,104	2,474
Total	3,516	1,201	2,170	6,887

The Commission recommended completing the register to a much earlier date and found that it was probable, from the data furnished by the register, that the whole of the existing statute law might be usefully consolidated into 300 or 400 statutes across 173 heads. The Commissioners had prepared ninety consolidating bills and advised that the work might require ten or twelve permanent draftsmen, and two years to complete.

== Legacy ==
The work of the Commission faced wide criticism from politicians, legal academics and commentators, who focused on the high expenditure of the committee, especially on the salary and motivations of the Commissioners and draftsmen, including Charles Henry Bellenden Ker, the proposed approach taken by the Commission to proceed with consolidation before expurgation, and the lack of results to show for it.

=== Criticism on expenditure ===
The first report accidentally included in the appendix criticism by Charles Henry Bellenden Ker of the resolution of the House of Commons decision to print an expurgatory list of statutes and a later resolution to bring forward a Bill to expurgate the statute book of those acts, as well as criticism of the Personal Estates of Intestates Bill after it had been passed by the House. This was acknowledged in Parliament on 2 August 1855 which did not object to the production of copies of replies to the appendix by Thomas Chisholm Anstey and George Coode. The matter was raised again by Peter Locke King MP on 11 April 1856, eliciting an apology from one of the Commissioners, Spencer Horatio Walpole.

On 8 May 1856, following criticism by Peter Locke King MP, the House of Commons ordered for returns showing a breakdown of expenditure of the Commission and a list of names and fees paid to each draftsmen of the proposed Consolidation Bills. In returns dated 9 May 1856, showed that the commission had incurred expenses of £2,919 7s. 5.s, leaving a balance of £3,029 11s. and 7d as of 30 April 1856. A motion to authorise the commissions expenditure closely passed on 2 June 1856, but was objected to by Peter Locke King MP who criticised the annual salary of £1,000 to Charles Henry Bellenden Ker (£600 for other Commissioners) and the £1,051 5s. spent on draftsmen, as well as the lack of results obtained by the Commission and its predecessors.

By 1869, the Commission incurred expenses of £40,052 23s. and 8d, which was subject to criticism by legal academics and commentators, and by politicians, including Peter Locke King MP and George Hadfield MP as part of a resolution criticising the expensive process of legal revision that had taken place over 36 years, costing the country over £80,000 without yielding substantial results.

=== Criticism on drafting ===
The draft bills proposed by the Committee were criticised for their quality of drafting. For example, provisions on larceny in stealing were re-enacted, although tallies of the exchequer ceased to exist twenty years prior. Other bills referred to embezzlements by officers of the South Sea Company, which had long since ceased to exist.

Furthermore, Bellenden Ker was criticised for not reviewing the draft bills, instead focusing in the first report of reviewing all bills introduced in either House of Parliament.

=== Criticism on approach ===
The Commission faced significant criticism in Parliament for its slow progress and perceived ineffectiveness. During a May 1855 debate, several MPs, including Richard Malins MP and Charles Napier MP, argued that the Commission's work was "totally futile" and had produced little tangible results despite significant expenditure. Critics pointed out that while the Commission was deliberating, Parliament continued to pass new acts, further complicating the statute law. The Lord Advocate, James Moncreiff MP defended the Commission, emphasizing the enormous difficulty of their task, while the Prime Minister, Viscount Palmerston, acknowledged these challenges but maintained that a Commission, rather than a parliamentary committee, remained the best vehicle for consolidation. The debate ultimately rejected a motion moved by Peter Locke King MP to establish an alternative approach through a select committee.

Following the Commission's second report, which recommended the appointment of an officer or board to revise and improve current legislation, the House of Commons resolved on 25 April 1856, requesting a "Copy of the Memorandum of the Attorney-general as to the plan of proceeding in Consolidation of the Statutes". The memorandum, dated 2 April 1856, was published on 9 May 1856. The Attorney General, Alexander Cockburn, proposed a plan of proceeding for the consolidation of the statutes, remarking that:

In order to form a correct judgment as to the course of proceeding which it is expedient to adopt in the Consolidation of the Statutes, it is, in the first place, necessary to have a clear view of what is the true nature and extent of the work which the Commission is called upon to execute. It will then be seen how far what has hitherto been proposed is adequate to the magnitude and importance of the work to be accomplished. To me, I must acknowledge, it appears that the view which has been taken of the object has been too limited and narrow, and that the mode of proceeding has, in consequence, been far from commensurate to the magnitude of the undertaking.

It can scarcely be denied that the state of the law of this country is discreditable to us as a great and enlightened people. Partly written, partly unwritten, that part of our law which is unwritten, is to be gathered from the decision sand dicta of judges, dispersed over many hundreds of volumes of reports, or from the opinions of text writers, of various degrees of authority, contained in innumerable works; while the written law is scattered over thousands of statutes, strung together without any attempt at order or arrangement, and forming no less than forty ponderous volumes; the whole body of the law thus consisting a chaotic mass, to which the 'many camel-loads' of jurisprudence, of which the Roman jurists complained, hardly afford a parallel. A life of labour scarcely suffices to the professional lawyer to master, even imperfectly, this vast amount of legal learning; while to the body of the people, whose rights and duties are to be determined, and whose conduct is to be regulated by the law, that law is practically a sealed book.

The time is at length come for remedying, at least in part, this mighty grievance. Although it is still deemed too difficult a task to attempt to embody, in the more tangible form of writing, the floating rules of the unwritten law, we are called upon by the high authority of the Crown to devise means for reducing into shape and order the heterogeneous mass of written laws which now swell and encumber our Statute Book.

The Attorney General criticised the course of action proposed by the Commission, which recommended selecting particular sets or bundles of the statutes for consolidation, for not wholly digesting the statute book and for not expurgating the statute book of obsolete, spent, unnecessary or superseded enactments. The Attorney General proposed alternative aims to the Commission:

1. To collect all statutes in force under appropriate heads, i.e., to consolidate.
2. To arrange these heads under the different branches into which the whole body of law divides itself, i.e., to digest.
3. To do this as a great, entire and comprehensive whole into a consolidated and digested body of statute law to be published at once.

To do so, the Attorney General proposed a plan of proceeding, which he suggested would be able to be done in twelve months:

1. To survey the whole body of the law under branches, divisions and subdivisions.
2. To set aside and omit statutes repealed expressly or by implication, or which have expired.
3. To present consolidating statutes to Parliament with a provision that all statutes not included be expressly repealed (with the exception of Magna Carta and the Bill of Rights, seen as a "profanation" to repeal).

=== The first Statute Law Revision Act ===
An alternative approach, focusing on expunging obsolete laws from the statute book, followed by consolidation, was proposed by Peter Locke King MP, who was heavily critical of the expenditure of the Commission and the lack of results. On 29 April 1856, Locke King introduced the Sleeping Statutes Bill, which implemented some recommendation for repeals made by the Commission. This led to the passing of the Repeal of Obsolete Statutes Act 1856 (19 & 20 Vict. c. 64), described by Halsbury's Laws and Courtenay Ilbert, as the first act for statute law revision (in the sense of repealing enactments which are obsolete, spent, unnecessary or superseded, or which no longer serve a useful purpose).

Leave to introduce bills relating to offences against the person, and bills of exchange and promissory notes, was granted to Sir Fitzroy Kelly MP on 14 February 1856. Kelly indicated that he would be laying eight bills relating to criminal offences, although these bills were substantially delayed in drafting and these bills were not proceeded with.

In 1857 a Select Committee was appointed to consider the Commission's second report to improve the manner and language of current legislation. The Committee took evidence from Coulson, Ker, and Coode, but their proceedings were interrupted by the dissolution of Parliament before they had time to make a report.

In April 1859, the Attorney General, Sir Fitzroy Kelly, introduced a series of bills to consolidate the criminal law, which had been prepared by the Commission. The bills became Charles Greaves' Criminal Law Consolidation Acts 1861. Speaking in Parliament, Kelly said:

A plan had been proposed to the Commission which had been to a considerable extent acted upon, and in accordance with which ninety-three bills were then ready, or nearly ready, which would consolidate the whole of the criminal statute law, the whole of the mercantile statute law, and the whole of the real property statute law.

Pursuant to an order of the House of Lords dated 5 July 1859, the Register of Public General Acts, which had been prepared by the Commission and consisted of two volumes from 1800 to the end of 1858, was published.

On 18 July 1859, Robert Rolfe, 1st Baron Cranworth, drew attention to the Fourth Report of the Commissioners, arguing that they had successfully catalogued and classified 6,887 statutes passed since the Union with Ireland, identifying 1,836 related to permanent rules of civil conduct. Cranworth proposed that the entire consolidation project could be completed within two years under the leadership of a dedicated senior barrister, effectively reducing the statute law to 300–400 consolidated acts contained in three to four volumes. To demonstrate the feasibility of consolidation, Cranworth introduced five sample bills:

1. A Bill to Consolidate the Statute Law of England relating to Marriages (Marriages Bill)
2. A Bill to Consolidate the Laws relating to the Registration of Births, Deaths, and Marriages in England (Registration Acts Consolidation Bill)
3. A Bill to Consolidate the Statute Law of England relating to Bills of Exchange and Promissory Notes (Bills of Exchange and Promissory Notes Bill)
4. A Bill to Consolidate the Statute Law of England relating to Executors and Administrators, and the Distribution of the Personal Property of deceased Persons (Executors and Administrators, &c., Bill)
5. A Bill to Consolidate the Statute Law relating to Aliens (Aliens Bill).

On 17 February 1860, the Attorney General, Sir Richard Bethell told the House of Commons that he had engaged Francis Reilly and A. J. Wood to expurgate the statute book of all acts which, though not expressly repealed, were not in force, working backwards from the present time. This became the Statute Law Revision Act 1861 (24 & 25 Vict. c. 101), the Statute Law Revision Act 1863 (26 & 27 Vict. c. 125) and subsequent Statute Law Revision Acts.

The Chronological Table of the Statutes, first published in 1870, resembled the sessional register of statutes published as a specimen in the Commission's third report dated 11 June 1857 and the complete register in the Commission's fourth report dated 21 June 1859.
