= James Crawford (lawyer) =

Scottish lawyer

James Crawfurd
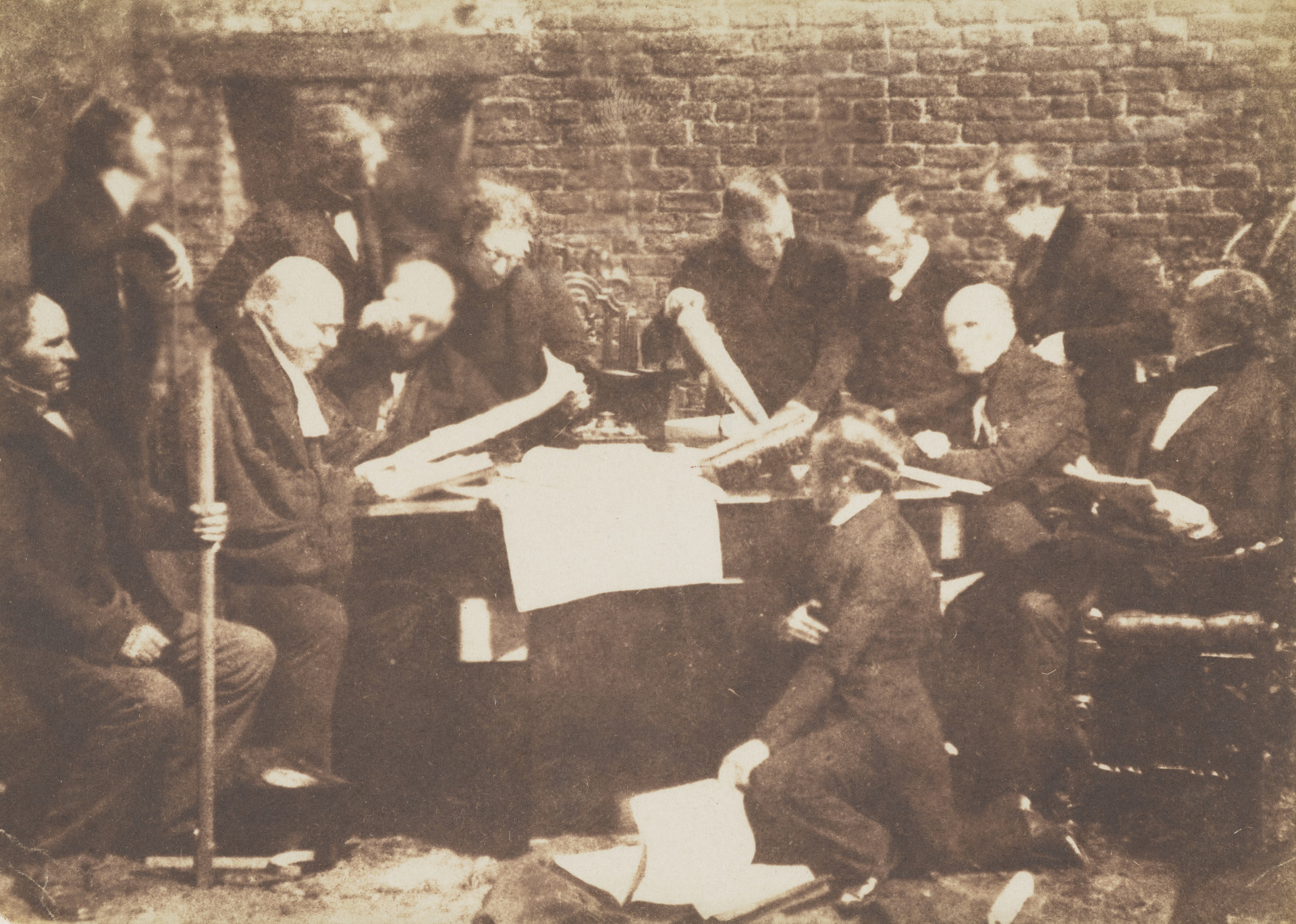
- Free Church committee by Hill & Adamson

Personal details
- Born: 17 December 1808
- Died: 17 November 1863 (aged 54)

Writer to the Signet

Session Clerk, St Andrews Free

Town Clerk for North Berwick

Free Church Deputy Clerk of Assembly

James Crawford (17 December 1808 – 17 November 1863) was a Scottish lawyer and church elder from Edinburgh. After the Disruption of 1843 he sided with the Free Church and was elected Deputy Clerk of the General Assembly of the Free Church of Scotland - a post he held for 20 years. He was also involved in local government and publishing. He served on several Free Church committees and was photographed in this role by Hill & Adamson.

== Early life and training ==
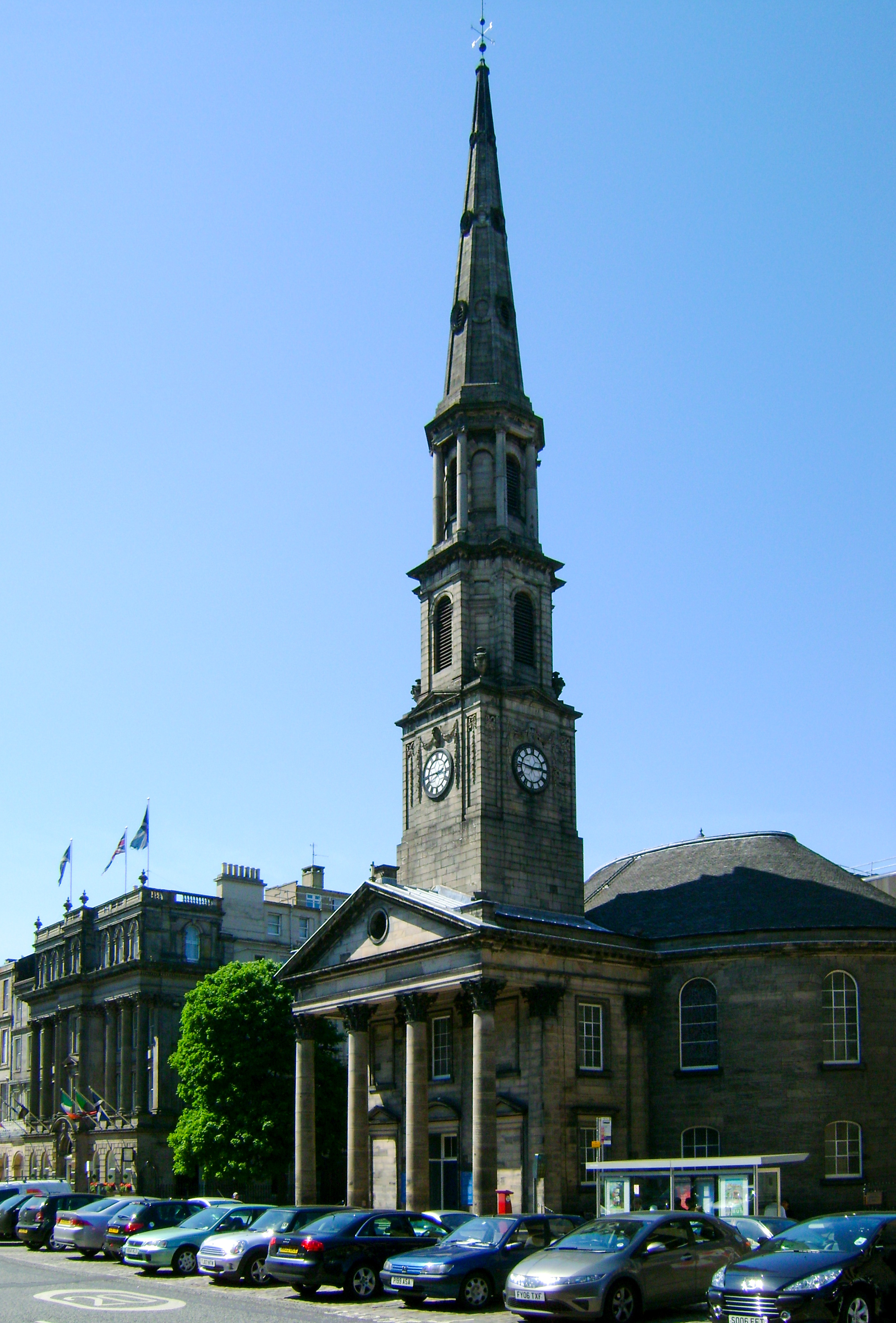
St Andrew's Church in Edinburgh

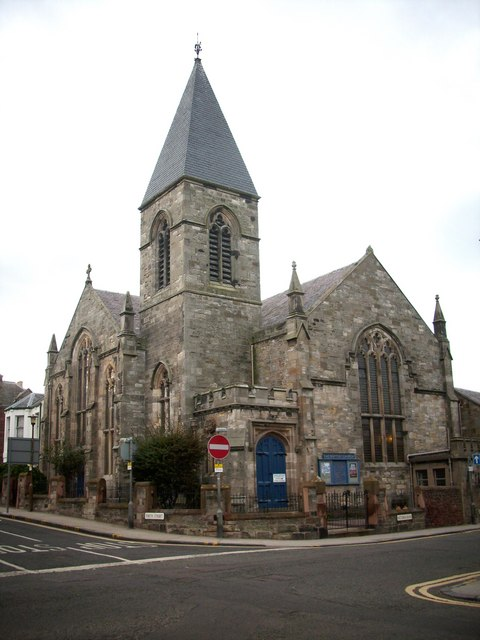
The original Blackadder Kirk, was at first a "church without the steeple".

James Crawford was born in North Berwick, on 17 December 1808. He was the son of Alexander Crawford, a tenant farmer in Rhodes, near North Berwick. Part of his education he received in that town, and part in Edinburgh. In Edinburgh studied law, and entered the office of Walter Dickson, Esq., W.S. He was apprentice to Walter Dickson and James Steuart.

He became a Writer to the Signet on 27 June 1833.

== Work in the Church of Scotland ==
In 1831 he was one of a small band who planned the Presbyterian Review — a periodical, literary, ecclesiastical, and theological in its character, which in after years exercised no small influence upon the affairs of the Church of Scotland.

Having all along taken an interest in ecclesiastical affairs, and being well versed in Church law, he assisted in editing the “Book of Styles,” published under the superintendence of the Church Law Society, of which he was a lay member. He was one of a small committee of that society to whom were entrusted in 1842 the editing of the Acts of the General Assembly of the Church of Scotland. The volume was published in the following year, with a brief preface by the Rev. Thomas Pitcairn, dated just three days before the Disruption, 15 May 1843.

== At the Disruption ==
James Crawford was the session clerk of the St Andrews Free Church congregation. He lived at 23 Elder Street in Edinburgh.

Crawford's father Alexander started Free Church services in a granary in North Berwick on Forth Street. Soon after the Disruption of 1843, James Crawford W.S., conceived the idea of building a Free Church in North Berwick, in commemoration of the Martyrs of the Bass, because, as he believed, the principles for which the Martyrs suffered were the same as those for which the Free Church had seceded. This was the object set forth on the collecting cards circulated among his friends, which bore the picture of the Bass. And it was to raise funds for this purpose that he persuaded his friends Thomas M'Crie the Historian, Anderson the Martyrologist, Hugh Miller the Geologist, and Professors Fleming and Balfour to unite together in writing the book known as “The Bass Rock.”

At the Disruption he was appointed Depute Clerk of the Free Church General Assembly, which office he continued to discharge till he died.

== Other work ==
In 1854, Crawford was appointed to the Royal Commission for Consolidating the Statute Law, a royal commission to consolidate existing statutes and enactments of English law.

== Character ==
Crawford was familiar with religious poetry, particularly hymns from the Reformation period onward, and could identify the names and works of poets. He printed selected hymns and leaflets for his own correspondence and other distribution.

== Death and burial ==
He died on 17 November 1863; and he lies buried in the Grange Cemetery.

== Family ==
He married:

- (1) 25 August 1846, Euphemia, daughter of Andrew Somerville, Luffness
- (2) 25 November 1856, Jane Watt, daughter of Robert Davidson, H.E.I.C.S.
