= Statute Law Revision Act 1893 (Canada) =

Act of the Parliament of the United Kingdom

Statute Law Revision Act 1893 (Note: Section 4.)
- Act of Parliament
- Parliament of the United Kingdom
- Long title: An Act for further promoting the Revision of the Statute Law by repealing Enactments which have ceased to be in force or have become unnecessary.
- Citation: 56 & 57 Vict. c. 14
- Territorial extent: British America

Dates
- Royal assent: 9 June 1893
- Commencement: 9 June 1893 (Note: The Acts of Parliament (Commencement) Act 1793.)

This article lists those sections of the Statute Law Revision Act 1893, an act of the Parliament of the United Kingdom, that deal with Canada through the repeal of several clauses of the British North America Act 1867.

== Schedule ==
The schedule to the act repeals several clauses, including the enactment clause of the British North America Act 1867 (later renamed the Constitution Act, 1867):

The British North America Act, 1867

In part; namely,

- From "Be it therefore" to "same as follows."
- Section two.
- Section four to "provisions" where it last occurs.
- Section twenty-five.
- Sections forty-two and forty-three.
- Section fifty-one, from "of the census" to "seventy-one and" and the word "subsequent."
- Section eighty-one.
- Section eighty-eight, from "and the House" to the end of the section.
- Section eighty-nine and one hundred and twenty-seven.
- Section one-hundred and forty-five.

Repealed as to all Her Majesty's Dominions.

== See also ==
- Statute Law Revision Act 1893
- Constitution Act, 1867
