= Statute book =

Record of enacted legislation

The Statute Book is the surviving body of enacted legislation published by authority in a number of publications.

In England at the end of 1948, the Statute Book printed by authority consisted of the twenty-four volumes of The Statutes: Second Revised Edition and the thirty-three volumes of Public General Acts published annually since 1920, making in all fifty-seven volumes.

In A First Book of English Law, Owen Hood Phillips said that there is no Statute Book. John Baker said that "the statute book" was no closer to being a historical entity than "the" register of writs was.

In autumn 1947, the Statute Law Committee was given terms of reference "to consider the steps necessary to bring the Statute Book up to date by consolidation, revision, and otherwise".
