= Walter Coulson =

English newspaper editor, barrister, writer and associate of Jeremy Bentham

Walter Coulson (1795 – 1860) was an English newspaper editor, barrister, writer and associate of Jeremy Bentham. He served as Parliamentary reporter on the Morning Chronicle and was the editor of the evening paper The Traveller.

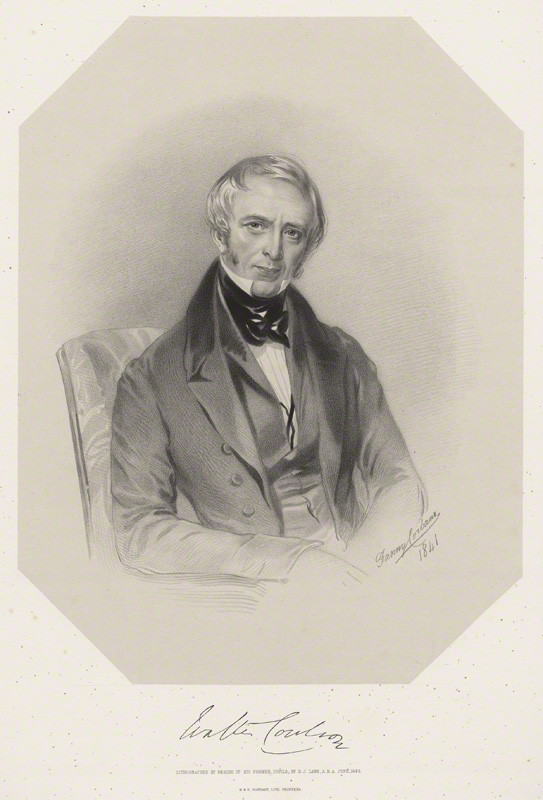
Walter Coulson, 1848 lithograph by Richard James Lane after Fanny Corbaux

== Life ==
He was the second son of Thomas Coulson, master painter in the royal dockyard at Devonport (died in 1845), and Catherine, second daughter of Walter Borlase, surgeon of Penzance, and was born at Torpoint in Cornwall. He acted as amanuensis to Bentham, and obtained a place as parliamentary reporter on the staff of the Morning Chronicle. James Mill and Francis Place were early friends, and the first writings of John Stuart Mill appeared in The Traveller in 1822, then owned by Robert Torrens and edited by Coulson.

The Traveller was merged with The Globe in 1823, and Coulson was appointed editor, with a salary of £800 a year and a share of the profits, continuing for some time as the reporter of the Chronicle, until The Globe flourished. He was called to the bar at Gray's Inn on 26 November 1828, becoming a Q.C. in July 1851, and a bencher of his inn in November 1851. He concentrated on conveyancing and chancery bar business. When differences of opinion arose between him and the proprietors of The Globe, he resigned the editorship.

Coulson was long the parliamentary draughtsman or counsel for the home department. The act for the sale of encumbered estates in Ireland was draughted by him and Lord Romilly. When the major change in the administration of Indian affairs occurred, the duty of collecting information on its laws and of drawing up a legal code was offered to Coulson; but he turned it down. He acted as a Commissioner on the Royal Commission that led to the Poor Law Amendment Act 1834.

Coulson was placed on the royal commission for the Great Exhibition of 1851, and took an active part in its proceedings.

Coulson was appointed to the Royal Commission for Consolidating the Statute Law, a royal commission to consolidate existing statutes and enactments of English law.

== Death ==
He died at North Bank, St. John's Wood, London, on 21 November 1860, and was buried at Kensal Green. His will was proved 14 December 1860, most of his landed property and personalty being left to his brother William Coulson the surgeon, for his life, and afterwards to his two nephews.

== Associations ==
Coulson lived in early life on close terms with men of letters in London. At Charles Lamb's evening parties he was a frequent guest, known as "the walking Encyclopædia". He was godfather to William Hazlitt's first child; Leigh Hunt was another of Coulson's friends, and through Hunt he was introduced to Bryan Waller Procter. Richard Harris Barham and Thomas Love Peacock wrote in his paper through their friendship with him, and he was one of James Mill's associates in his Sunday walks. Coulson is said to have contributed to the Edinburgh Review a review of Mill's History of India, and he wrote in the Parliamentary History and Review. In June 1821 he was elected a member of the Political Economy Club, and from 1823 to 1858 brought forward at its meetings questions for discussion. John Black, the editor of the Morning Chronicle, lived from 1843 to 1855 in a cottage on Coulson's estate near Maidstone.
