= A First Book of English Law =

English book written in 1948

- 7th Edition
- Author: Owen Hood Phillips
- Original title: A First Book of English Law
- Published: 1948
- Publisher: Sweet and Maxwell

A First Book of English Law is a book originally written by Owen Hood Phillips and subsequently edited by him and Anthony Hugh Hudson. It was published by Sweet and Maxwell. F.R. Crane praised it for its "lucidity, accuracy, brevity and readability" and said that it was "deservedly acclaimed".

The First Edition was published in 1948, the Second in 1953, the Third in 1955, the Fourth in 1960, the Fifth in 1965, the Sixth in 1970, and the Seventh in 1977.

== First Edition ==
This edition was reviewed by The Accountant and The Journal of Education.

== Second Edition ==
This edition was reviewed by The Law Times, The Law Journal, The Solicitors' Journal, The Solicitor, The Industrial Law Review and The American Journal of Comparative Law.

== Third Edition ==
This edition was reviewed by The Law Times, The Law Journal, Justice of the Peace and Local Government Review, The Solicitors' Journal, The Solicitor and Law Notes.

== Fourth Edition ==
This edition was reviewed by The Law Times, Graya, The Solicitors' Journal, The Solicitor and Law Notes.

== Fifth Edition ==
This edition was reviewed by The Law Times, Justice of the Peace and Local Government Review, The Law Society's Gazette, The Solicitor Quarterly, The Journal of the Society of Public Teachers of Law and the University of Ghana Law Journal.

== Sixth Edition ==
This edition was reviewed by The Solicitors' Journal, The Malayan Law Journal, and the Malaya Law Review.

== Seventh Edition ==
This edition was reviewed by Justice of the Peace The Solicitors' Journal, The Irish Jurist, The Northern Ireland Legal Quarterly, Revue de droit international et de droit comparé, The Cambrian Law Review and Review of Ghana Law.
