= Charles Henry Bellenden Ker =

English barrister and legal reformer (c.1785–1871)

Charles Henry Bellenden Ker (c. 1785 – 1871) was an English barrister and legal reformer.

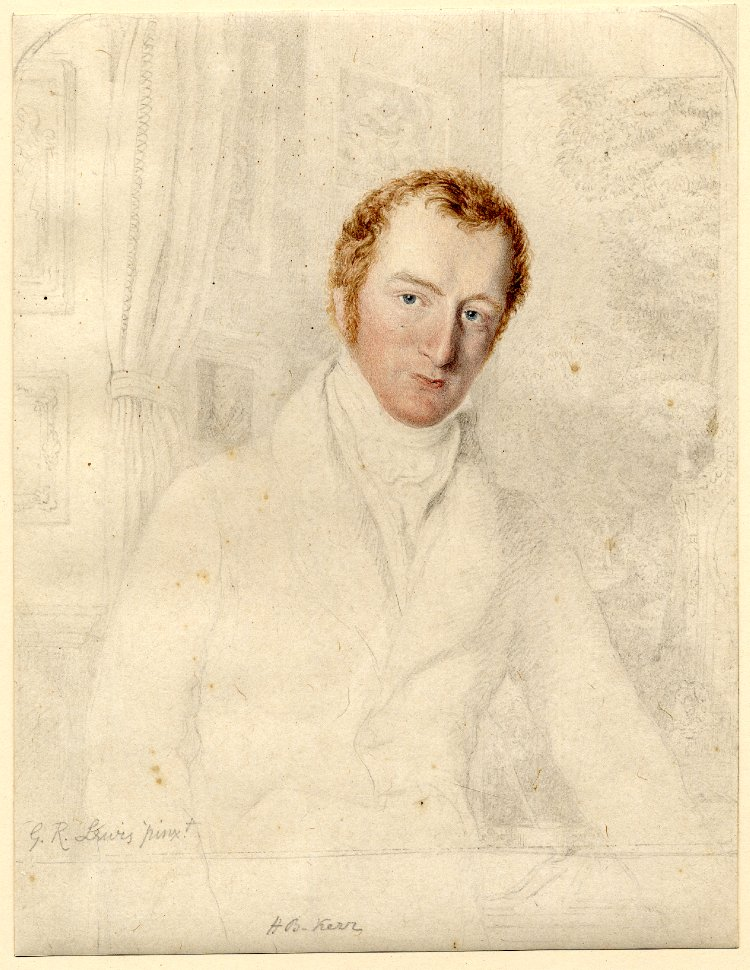
Charles Henry Bellenden Ker, drawing by George Robert Lewis

== Early life ==
The son of John Bellenden Ker, he was born about 1785. As a young man, he was a patron of William Blake, though unwilling when it came to payment in 1810. Blake took some legal steps, and George Cumberland became involved.

Ker was called to the bar by the Society of Lincoln's Inn on 28 June 1814, and obtained a large practice as a conveyancer. Active in promoting parliamentary reform from 1830 to 1832, he was a member of the boundary commission, and contested Norwich unsuccessfully in the Whig interest.

== Reformer ==
Ker was a member of the Public Records Commission.

In 1833, Ker was appointed to the Royal Commission on the Criminal Law 1833, a royal commission to consolidate existing statutes of criminal law into an English Criminal Code. Some Bills for the amendment of the criminal law were based on the reports of the commission.

In 1845, Ker was appointed to the Royal Commission on the Criminal Law 1845, a royal commission to complete the unfinished report of the Commission of 1833, to consider amendments and consolidations of the criminal law and to prepare a bill for that purpose.

In 1845, with Hayes and Christie, Ker drew up for Lord-chancellor Lyndhurst a short Bill; it passed into an Act (8 & 9 Vict c 106) amending the law of real property.

In 1853 Lord Cranworth appointed Ker head of the Board for the Revision of the Statute Law to consider the consolidation of the statute law. In 1854, when that board was replaced in 1854, Ker was appointed to the Royal Commission for Consolidating the Statute Law as a leading member. The action of the board and commission led to the revised edition of the statutes, the successive Statute Law Revision Acts, the issue of the chronological tables of the statute law, and to the Criminal Law Acts of 1861.

Ker also suggested and prepared the Leases and Sales of Settled Estates Act 1856, and Lord Cranworth's Act 1860, which were finally superseded by the Conveyancing and Settled Land Acts, modelled to a great extent on Ker's work.

== Later life and other interests ==
In 1852 the office of master in chancery was abolished, and that of conveyancing counsel to the court of chancery was instituted. To that post Ker was soon afterwards appointed during that year. He held that post till 1860. He was recorder of Andover from 1842 to July 1855.

Ker was an advocate of popular education, and of the diffusion of literature and art. Charles Knight, in Passages of a Working Life, ii. 120, 121, says that he was "the most fertile in projects of any member of the committee" of the Society for the Diffusion of Useful Knowledge, and suggested many publishing schemes apart from the society.

Two of Charles Lock Eastlake's works were painted for Ker. He was himself a contributor of woodcuts as well as lives of Christopher Wren and Michelangelo to the Penny Magazine. He was an original member of the Arundel Society, was interested in the foundation of schools of design, and helped to promote the establishment of the Department of Science and Art.

Ker was one of the first private growers of orchids, and he wrote a series of articles under the pseudonym "Dodman" in the Gardeners' Chronicle. He was in early life a fellow of the Royal Society, but resigned his fellowship when in 1830 the Duke of Sussex was chosen president.

== Last years ==
In 1860 Ker retired from practice, and lived the rest of his life at Cannes, where he died on 2 November 1871.

== Works ==
Ker is the author of

- The question of registry or no registry considered, with reference to the interests of landholders (1830)
- Shall we register our deeds? (1853)

== Family ==
Ker married Elizabeth Anne, daughter of Edward Clarke, a solicitor. They had no children.
