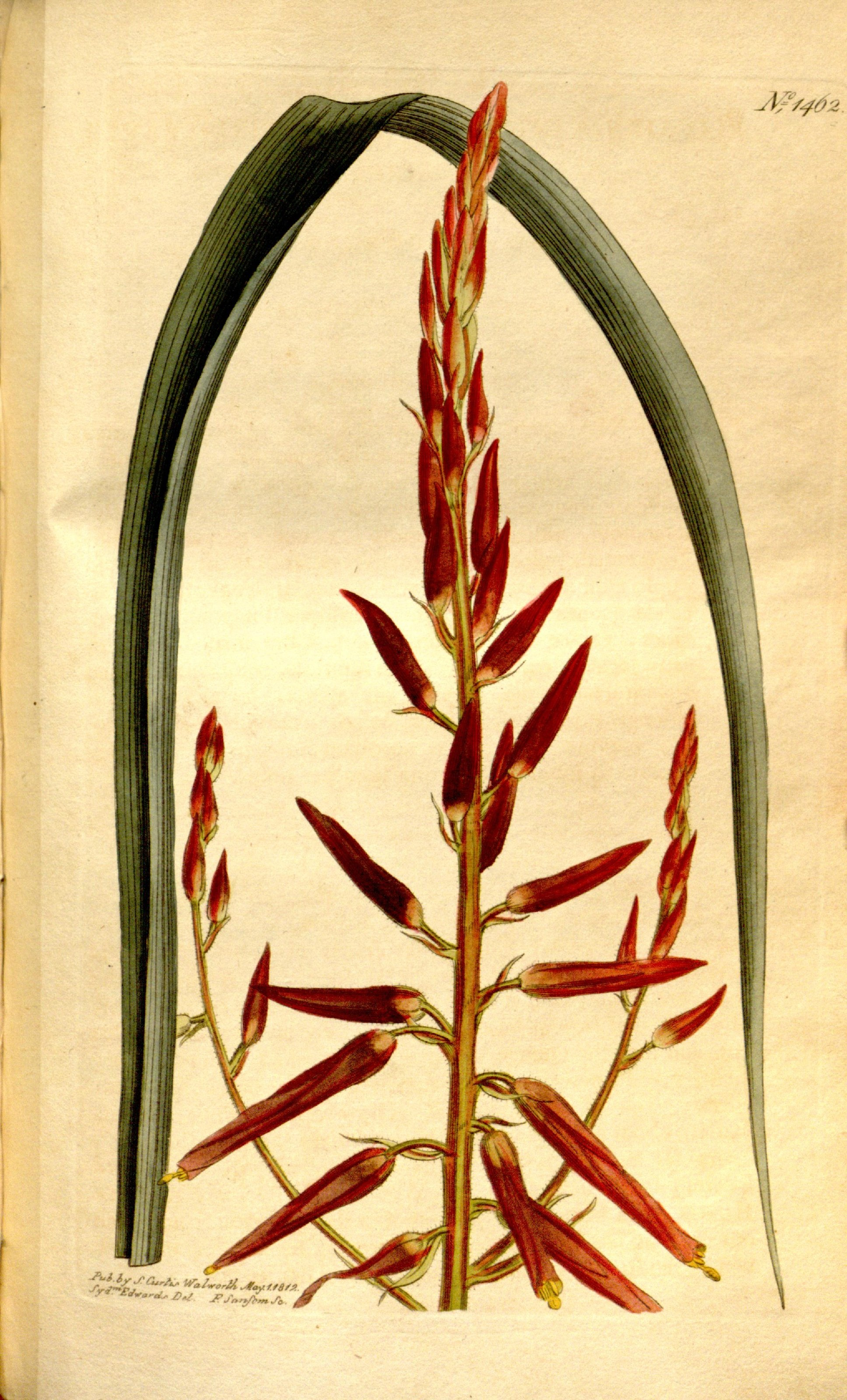

Scientific classification
- Kingdom: Plantae
- Clade: Tracheophytes
- Clade: Angiosperms
- Clade: Monocots
- Clade: Commelinids
- Order: Poales
- Family: Bromeliaceae
- Genus: Pitcairnia
- Species: P. integrifolia

Binomial name
- Pitcairnia integrifolia Ker-Gawler

Synonyms
- Hepetis integrifolia (Ker Gawl.) Mez; Pitcairnia decora A.Dietr.; Pitcairnia alta Hassk.; Pitcairnia graminifolia Baker; Pitcairnia intermedia Baker; Pitcairnia anthericoides Mez; Hepetis anthericoides (Mez) Mez; Hepetis tenuis Mez; Pitcairnia hartmannii Mez; Pitcairnia tenuis (Mez) Mez

= Pitcairnia integrifolia =

Species of flowering plant

Pitcairnia integrifolia is a plant species in the genus Pitcairnia. This species is native to Venezuela, Brazil and Trinidad and Tobago.
