= Thomas Chisholm Anstey =

English lawyer and Catholic parliamentarian

- 晏士地
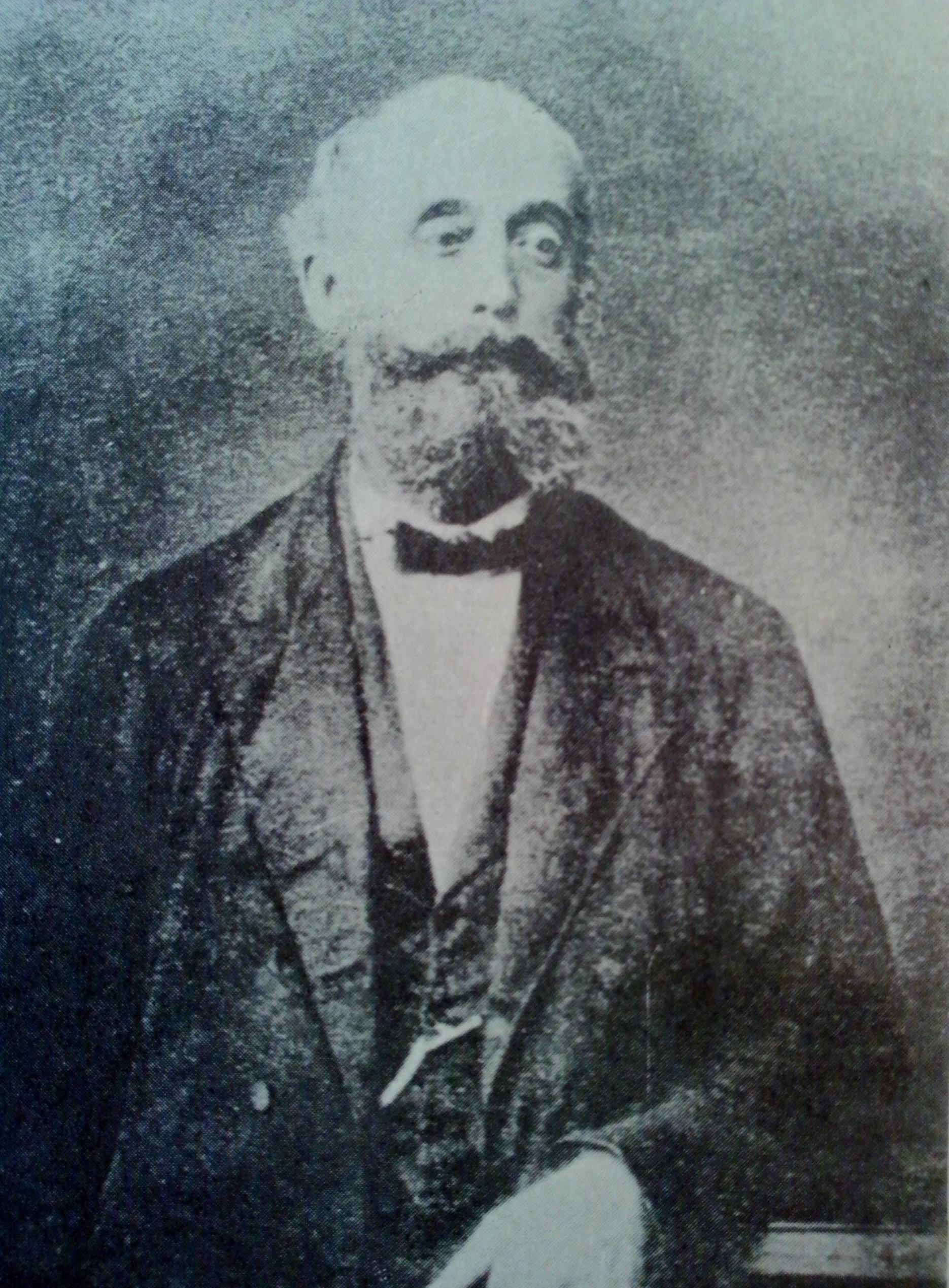

Attorney General of Hong Kong
- In office 1855–1859
- Governor: John Bowring
- Preceded by: Paul Ivy Sterling
- Succeeded by: William Adams

Member of Parliament for Youghal
- In office August 1847 – July 1852
- Preceded by: Charles Cavendish
- Succeeded by: Isaac Butt

Personal details
- Born: 1816 Kentish Town, London
- Died: 12 August 1873 Bombay, British India
- Party: Liberal
- Other political affiliations: Irish Confederate
- Education: University College London

Thomas Chisholm Anstey (1816 – 12 August 1873) was an English lawyer and one of the first Catholic parliamentarians in the nineteenth century. He served as Attorney General of Hong Kong for 4 years. He also wrote pamphlets on legal and political topics, particularly those relevant to Catholics.

== Early life ==
He was the second son of Thomas Anstey (1777–1851) and his wife Mary Turnbull, born in Kentish Town, London. In 1823, his father, a lawyer who had gone into commerce, moved to Tasmania, and he followed in 1827 with his elder brother George Alexander (1814–1895). In his early education he studied Hebrew with the minister James Garrett.

Anstey returned to England, intending to take up law, and was educated at school in Wellington, Somerset and at University College London. He came under the influence of the Tractarians, and also entered the Middle Temple, being called to the bar in 1839. He had become a Catholic convert, married that year, and moved with his wife to Hobart, Tasmania. He became a Catholic leader there, and achieved prominence for a court appearance (R. v. Espie, 1840). He lost a position as commissioner of insolvent estates after a few months.

Returning to England, Anstey took an appointment as Professor of Law and Jurisprudence at Prior Park College, Bath. By 1846 he had turned his attention to politics, and resigned.

== Political career ==
On entering politics in 1846, Anstey aligned with the more radical followers of Daniel O'Connell, who died in 1847, and supported William Smith O'Brien. He favoured the repeal of the Union both with Ireland and Scotland. He was a Liberal in English politics, but Walker classifies him as an Irish Confederate candidate when he was elected Member of Parliament for the Irish constituency of Youghal in 1847. An opponent of Lord Palmerston, Anstey often worked with David Urquhart as an ally in foreign policy issues.

He was not renominated at Youghal in 1852, but contested Bedford in the general election of that year.

== Legal career ==
On Anstey's return to England, he joined the Northern Circuit before moving to practice at the Chancery Bar. After he dropped out of Parliament, in 1855, he was appointed Attorney General of Hong Kong and served in that capacity until 1859. His attempts to enforce building regulations on Chinese merchants led in 1858 to a strike, retrospectively named the "Anstey Riots".

Anstey left Hong Kong in 1859, having fallen out with the Governor Sir John Bowring. He went to Bombay where at times he acted as a judge of the High Court of Bombay in 1865. He came back to England in 1866 and in a tract entitled A Plea for the Unrepresented for the Restitution of the Franchise advocated universal suffrage as a panacea for the ills resulting from class legislation. He published an attack on the Reform Act 1867 proposed by Benjamin Disraeli. He was on the defence side in the Maharaj Libel Case.

In 1868 Anstey returned to Bombay and resumed his practice as a barrister.

Anstey died in Bombay on 17 August 1873, ending a life hampered by quarrels. He was buried at Sewri.

== Works ==
Anstey's publications included:

- British Catholics and the New Parliament (1841),
- Guide to the Laws of England affecting Roman Catholics (1842)
- Guide to the History of the Laws and Constitution of England in Six Lectures
- Crime and Government at Hong Kong (1859)

He was a contributor in its early years to the Dublin Review.

== Family ==
In 1839, Anstey married Harriet, daughter of Jarrard Edward Strickland of Loughlinn, County Roscommon, Ireland. She was one of a family of six sons, including Edward Strickland, and four daughters.

Parliament of the United Kingdom
Preceded by Charles Cavendish	Member of Parliament for Youghal; 1847 – 1852	Succeeded by Isaac Butt
Legal offices
Preceded by Paul Ivy Sterling	Attorney General of Hong Kong; 1855–1859	Succeeded by William Henry Adams
