= John Bellenden Ker =

English botanist (1764–1842)

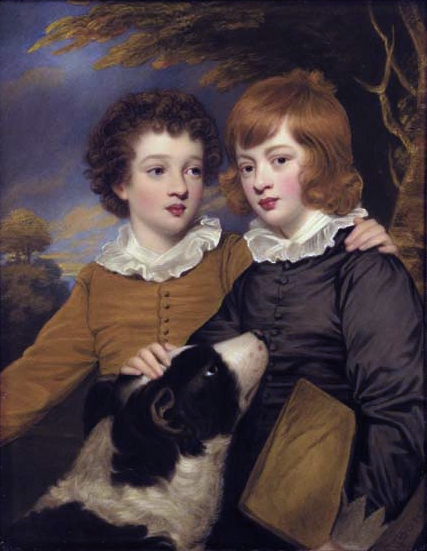
John Bellenden Ker (r.) as child with his brother Henry Gawler (painted by Henry Bone)

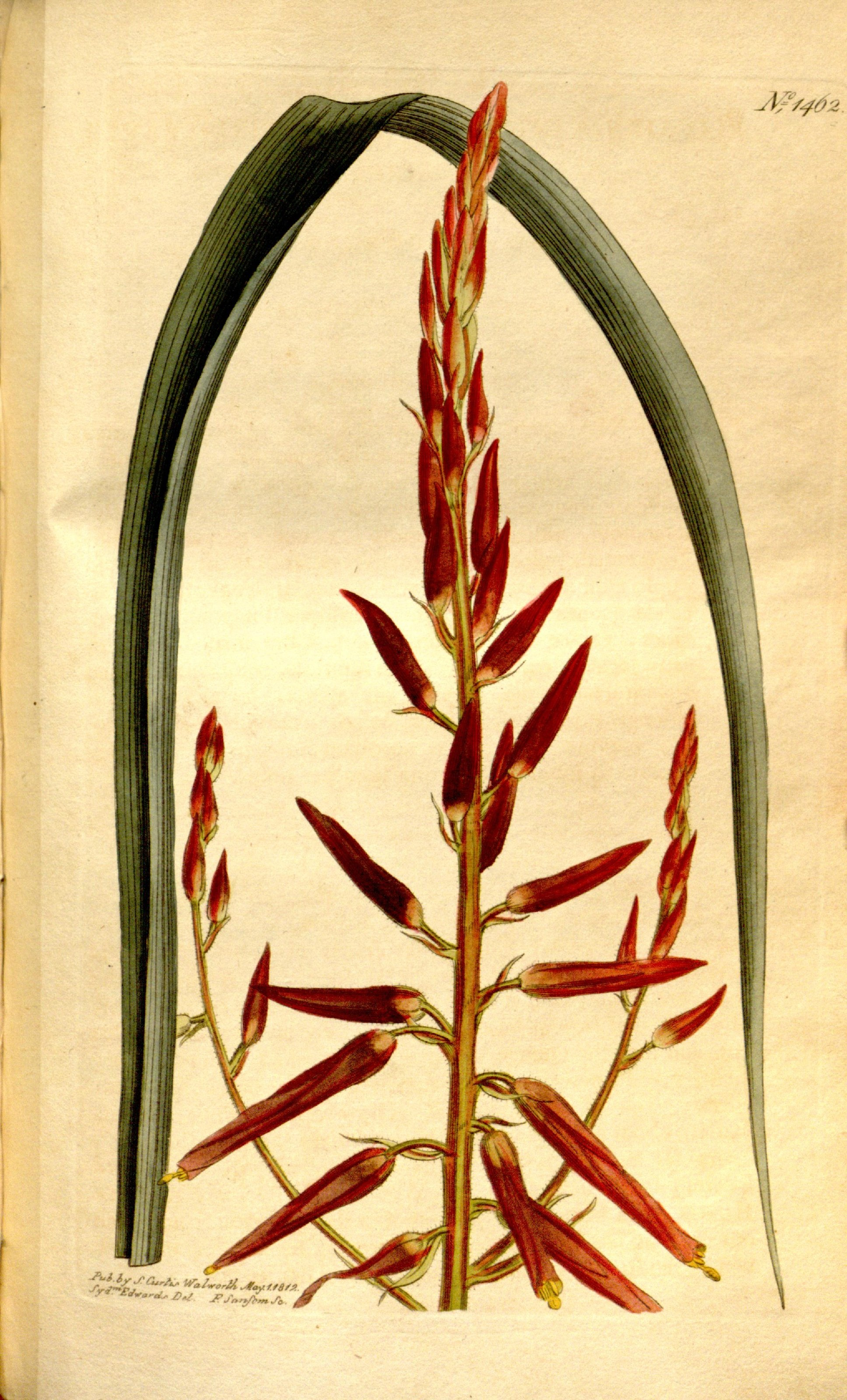
Pitcairnia integrifolia, one of many plants named by John Bellenden Ker

John Bellenden Ker (né Gawler) was an English botanist, born about 1764, Ramridge, Andover, Hampshire, which was where he died in June 1842. On 5 November 1804, he changed his name to Ker Bellenden, but continued to sign his name as Bellenden Ker until his death. He was an unsuccessful claimant to the Roxburghe dukedom. His son was legal reformer Charles Henry Bellenden Ker.

He is noted for having written Recensio Plantarum (1801), Select Orchideae (c. 1816) and Iridearum Genera (1827). He contributed to Curtis's Botanical Magazine under John Sims, using the initial G. He edited Edward's Botanical Register from 1815 to 1824 and was famous as a wit and botanist as well as being the author of Archaeology of Popular Phrases and Nursery Rhymes (1837). The 2nd volume of this work was published in 1840. Robert Brown (1773–1858) named the genus Bellendena of the Proteaceae in his honour in 1810. The state of Queensland in Australia has named its second highest peak Mount Bellenden Ker. The Bellenden Ker Range in the same area was also named after him.

His work on English nursery rhymes argued in four volumes that they were actually written in "Low Saxon", a hypothetical early form of Dutch. He then "translated" them back into English, revealing particularly a strong tendency to anti-clericalism.

The standard author abbreviation Ker Gawl. is used to indicate this person as the author when citing a botanical name.

== Sources ==
- Ray Desmond (1994). Dictionary of British and Irish Botanists and Horticulturists including Plant Collectors, Flower Painters and Garden Designers. Taylor & Francis and The Natural History Museum (London).
- Lee, Sidney, ed. (1892). "Ker, John Bellenden" . Dictionary of National Biography. Vol. 31. London: Smith, Elder & Co.
