= Owen Hood Phillips =

Owen Hood Phillips QC
- Born: 30 September 1907
- Died: 25 May 1986 (aged 78)
- Education: Weymouth College, Merton College, Oxford
- Occupation: jurist
- Notable work: A First Book of English Law
- Spouse(s): Lucy Mary Carden, née Philip (m. 1949)
- Parents: Surgeon-Captain John Elphinstone Hood Phillips, RN (father); Kathleen Marian Esther, née Way (mother)

Owen Hood Phillips, QC (30 September 1907 – 25 May 1986) was a British jurist. He was Lady Barber Professor of Jurisprudence at the University of Birmingham and Dean of the Faculty of Law, Vice-Principal and Pro-Vice-Chancellor of that university.

The son of Surgeon-Captain John Elphinstone Hood Phillips, RN and of Kathleen Marian Esther, née Way, Phillips was educated at Weymouth College, and went up to Merton College, Oxford in 1926, graduating MA and BCL. He was called to the Bar by Gray's Inn in 1930. After pupillages, Phillips did not practise at the bar, instead opting for an academic career. He was a lecturer at King's College, London from 1931 to 1935, at Trinity College Dublin from 1935 to 1937, when he returned to King's College as Reader in English Law and vice-dean.

During the Second World War, he served in the Ministries of Labour and National Service and Aircraft Production. In 1946, he became Lady Barber chair of jurisprudence at the University of Birmingham, becoming Dean of the Faculty of Law in 1949, serving until 1968.

He married Lucy Mary Carden, née Philip, in 1949.

== Works ==
- Questions and Answers on Real Property and Conveyancing. 1932. 2nd Ed: 1939.
- Principles of English Law and the Constitution. 1939.
- A First Book of English Law. 1948 (1st of 7 editions)
- Constitutional and Administrative Law.
- Thomas & Hood Philips' Leading Cases in Constitutional Law. 8th Ed: 1947.
- Leading Cases in Constitutional Law. 1952. 2nd Ed: 1957. Leading Cases in Constitutional and Administrative Law. 3rd Ed: 1967. 4th Ed: 1973. 5th Ed: 1979.
- Reform of the Constitution. 1970. This book is part of "The Reform Series".
- Shakespeare and the Lawyers. 1972. Reprinted 2005. Paperback 2010.

O Hood Phillips was joint author, with Harold Potter, of the third edition of A Short Outline of English Legal History (1933).
