= Copperplate map of London =

Map of the City of London created in 1550s

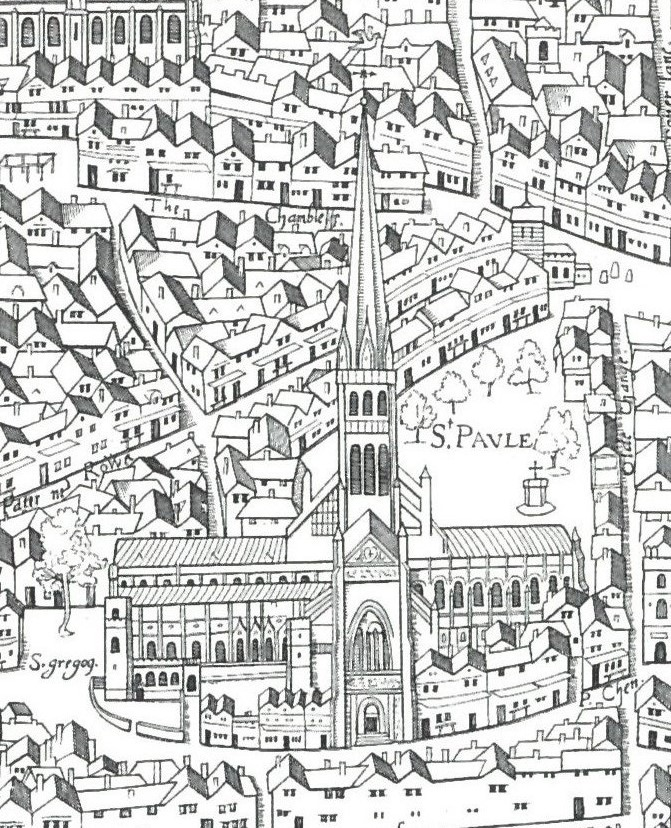
Detail from the Copperplate map showing St Paul's Cathedral

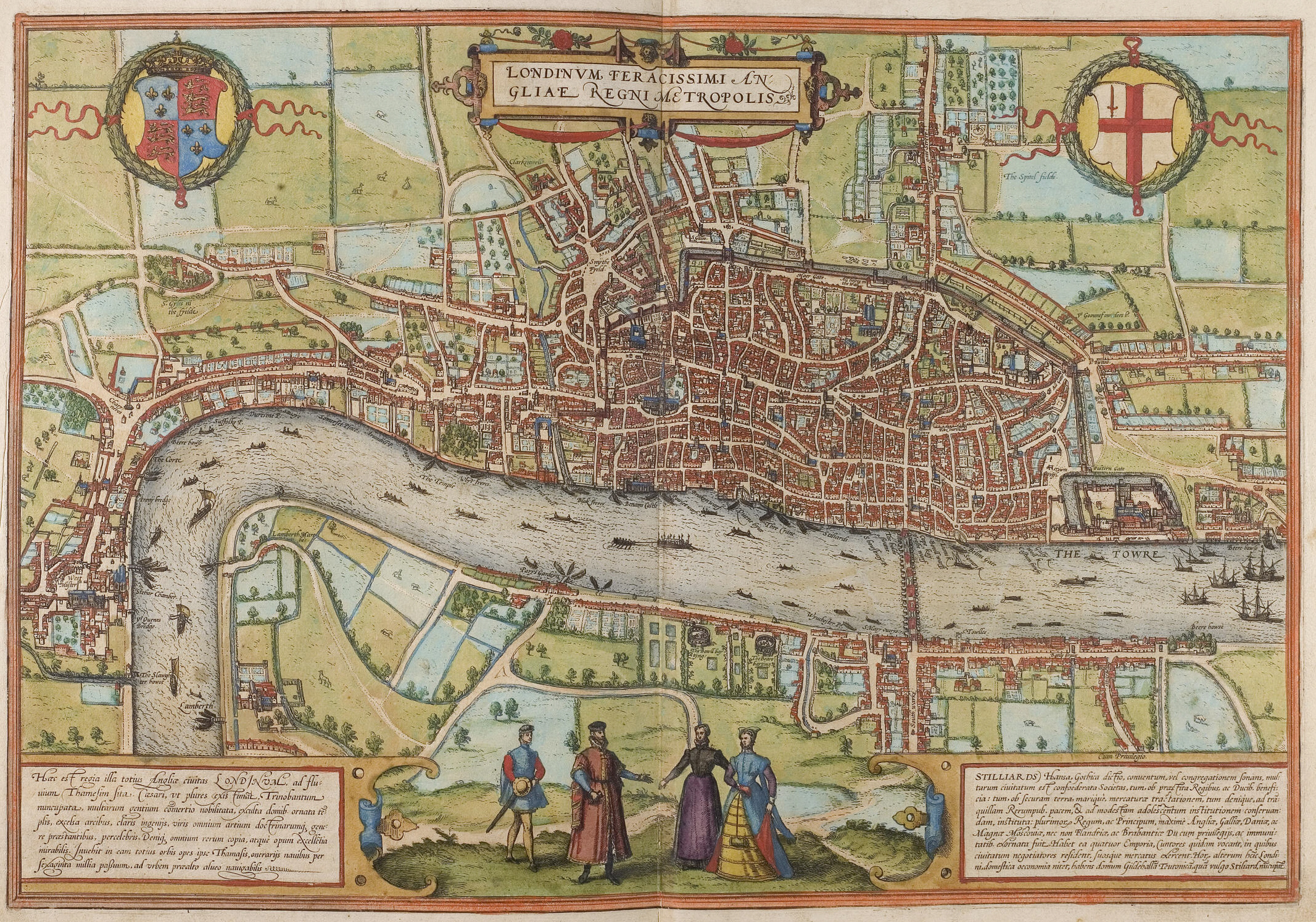
Braun and Hogenberg's map of London (published 1572), showing the likely extent of the area originally covered by the full Copperplate map

The "Copperplate" map of London is an early large-scale printed map of the City of London and its immediate environs, surveyed between 1553 and 1559, which survives only in part. It is the earliest true map of London (as opposed to panoramic views, such as those of Anton van den Wyngaerde). The original map was probably designed for hanging on a wall, and is believed to have measured approximately 3 feet 8 inches (112 cm) high by 7 feet 5 inches (226 cm) wide. No copies of the printed map itself are known to have survived; but between 1962 and 1997 three of the original engraved copper printing-plates – from a probable total of 15 – were identified. Although only a fragmentary portion of the map is known, the three plates cover the greater part of the built-up heart of the City of London.

The map takes the form of a "bird's-flight view": that is to say, the street layout and other ground features are shown in plan, as if viewed directly from above; while buildings, people and other standing features are shown as if viewed from a great height to the south of the City, but without the foreshortening of more distant features that would be necessary for a true perspective view.

The map is clearly the source for the slightly smaller-scale and cruder "Woodcut" map, formerly attributed to Ralph Agas, which dates from shortly after 1561; and also, directly or indirectly, for the greatly reduced map of London included in Georg Braun and Frans Hogenberg's Civitates Orbis Terrarum, published in Cologne and Amsterdam in 1572. These two derivative maps allow the original extent and size of the Copperplate map to be estimated.

== Production ==
The Copperplate map may have been engraved by mapmakers from the Low Countries, an important centre of surveying and printing at the time: this is suggested by some of its inscriptions and other details. Its date coincides approximately with the joint reign of Queen Mary I and her husband Philip of Spain (i.e. 1554–58). Philip, whose realms also included the Spanish Netherlands, was known as a keen collector of town and city plans, and may have commissioned or patronised the Copperplate map. It has also been suggested that Hanseatic merchants in London, and the humanist scholar George Lily, played some part in its production.

All three surviving plates are heavily worn, suggesting that they were used for printing many times.

== Surviving plates ==
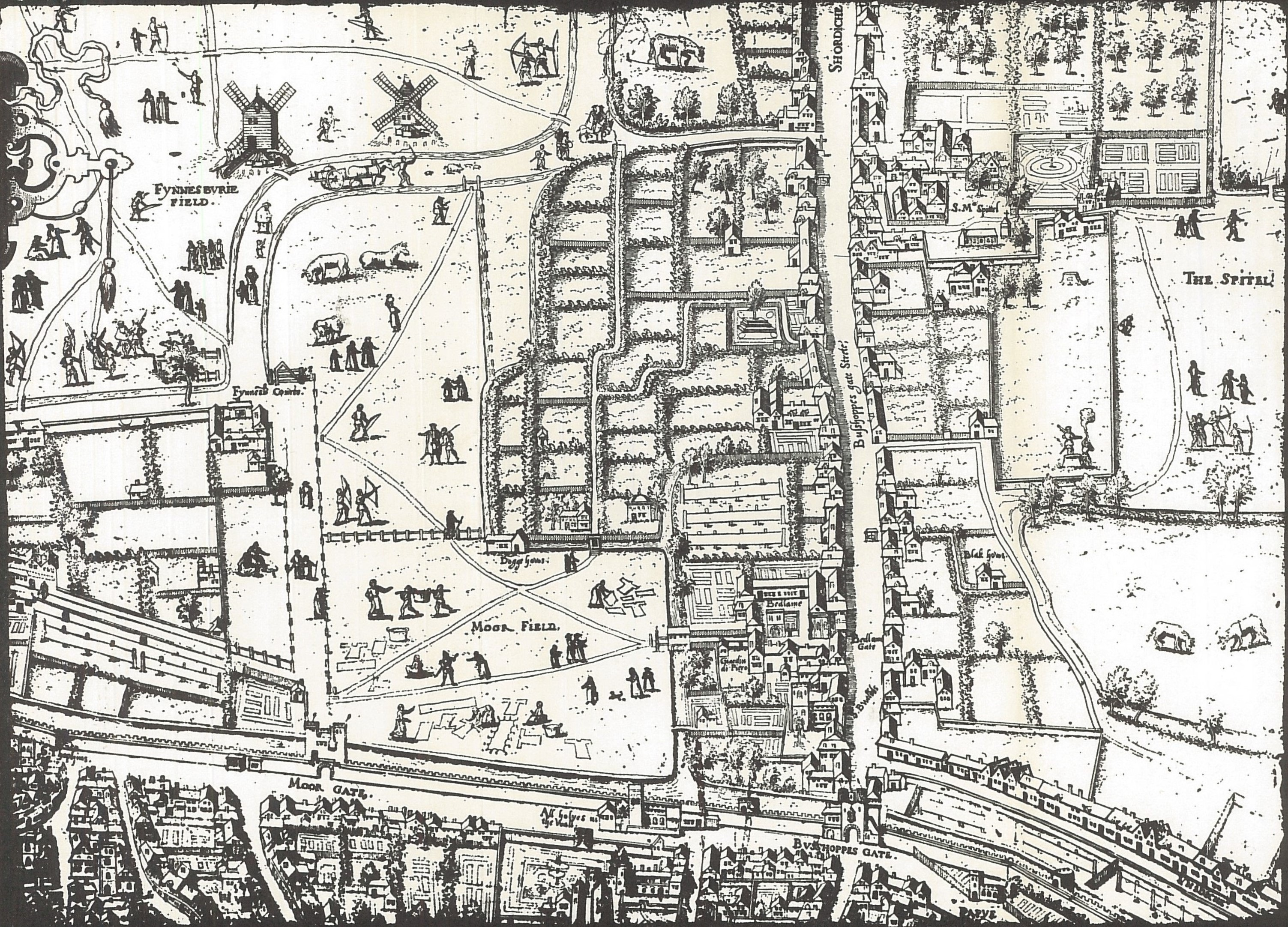
The Moorfields plate

=== Moorfields ===
The first plate was discovered in 1962, when an art-dealer contacted the London Museum. It depicts part of the northern perimeter of the City of London, including a length of the city wall, the gates of Moorgate and Bishopsgate, and the suburbs of Moorfields and Spitalfields. The reverse of the plate had been used for a painting of the Tower of Babel, dated to c. 1600 and attributed to Marten van Valckenborch or a member of his circle. The plate was acquired by the London Museum, and is now in its successor institution, the Museum of London.

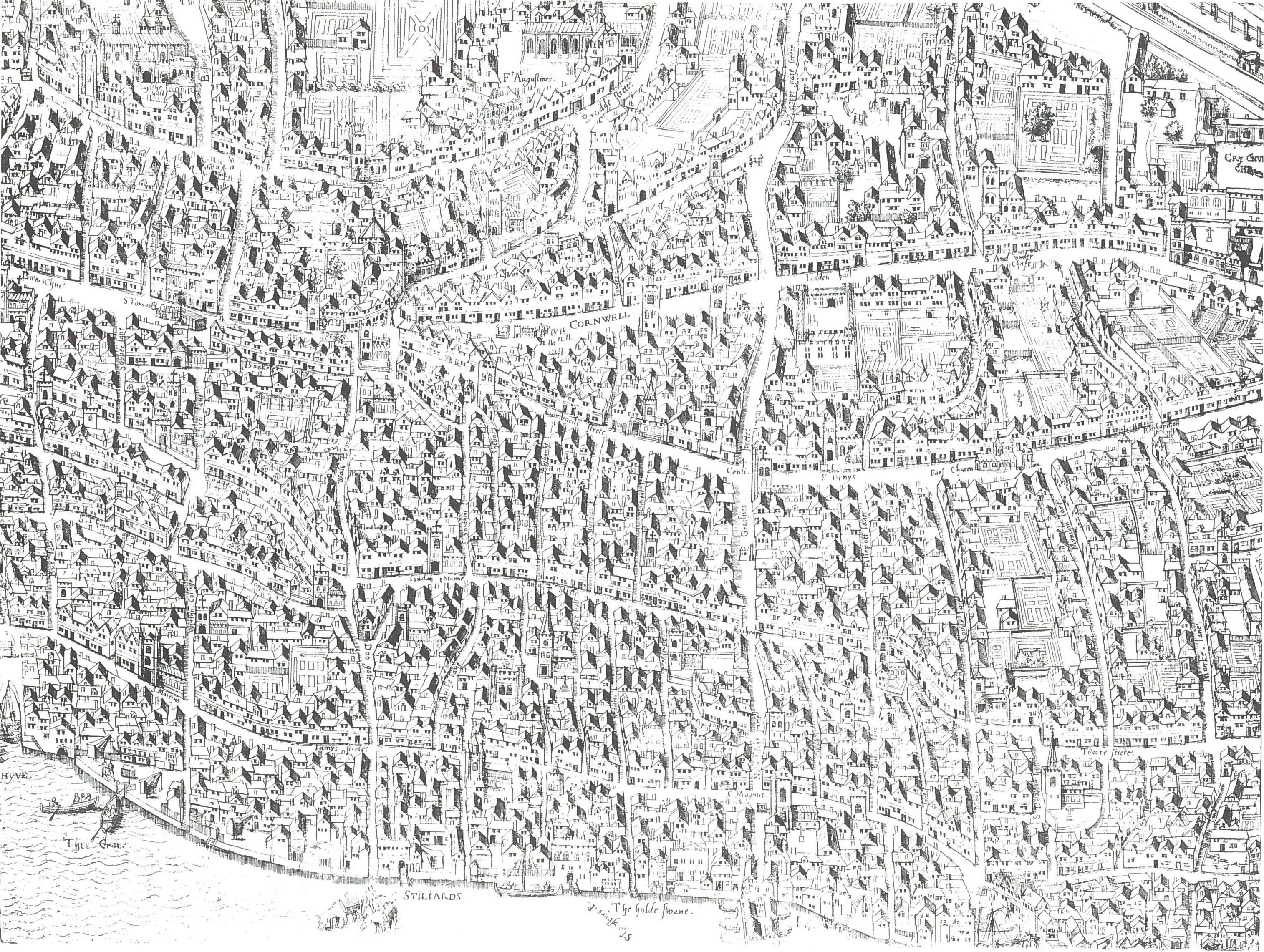
The eastern City plate

=== Eastern City ===
The second plate was identified shortly afterwards in private ownership. The map section shows much of the eastern part of the City (immediately to the south of the area covered by the first plate, and extending south to the banks of the Thames), including Guildhall and the northern end of London Bridge. The reverse of the plate had been used for a painting of the Coronation and Assumption of the Virgin, painted in c. 1600 and attributed to Hieronymus Francken I. This plate was also purchased by the Museum of London in 1985.

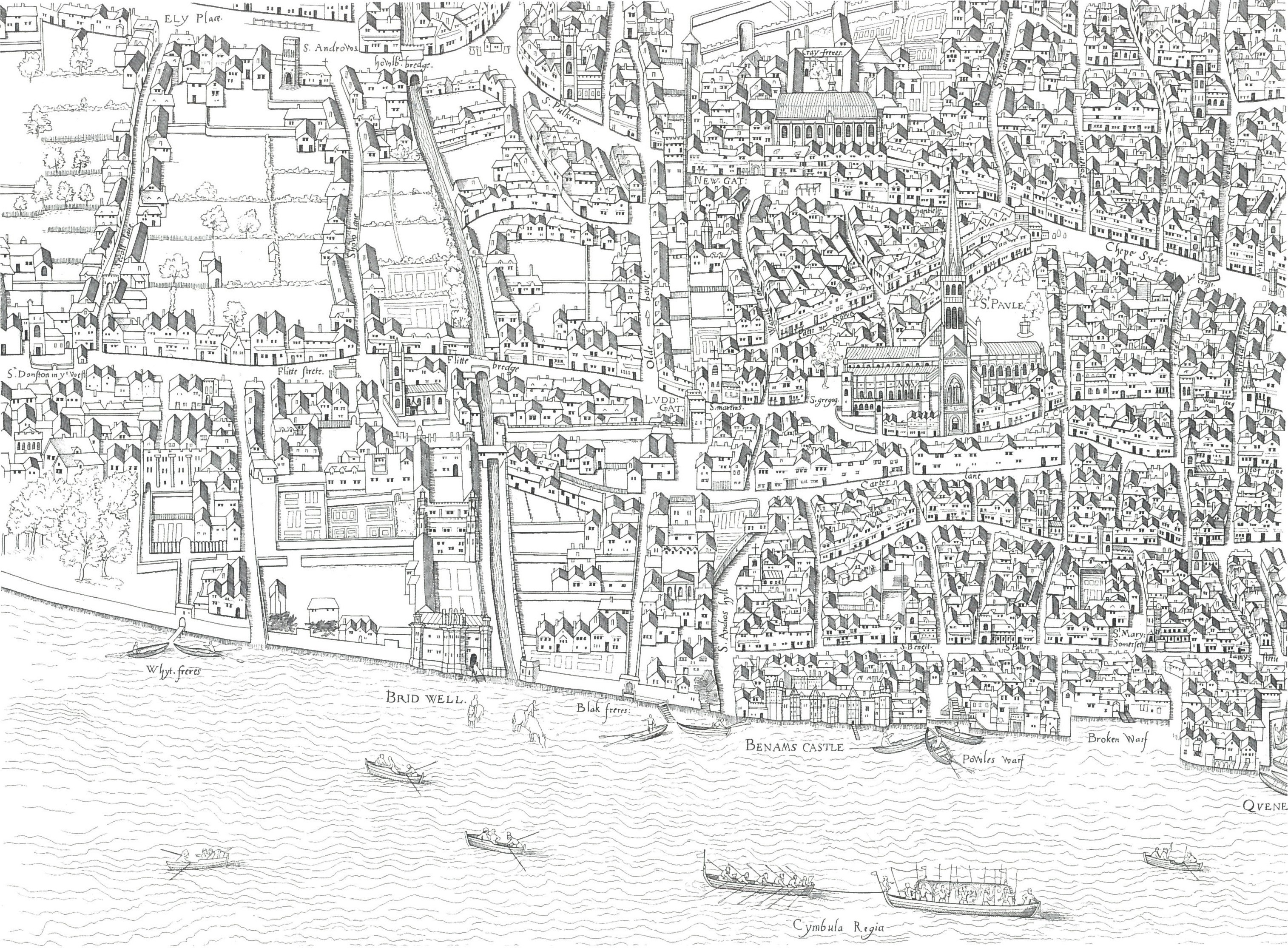
The western City plate

=== Western City ===
The third plate was identified in 1997 in the collections of the Anhaltische Gemäldegalerie, housed in the Georgium, Dessau, Germany. This map section shows much of the western part of the City (immediately to the west of the area covered by the second plate, again extending south to the Thames, and west to the church of St Dunstan-in-the-West), with St Paul's Cathedral and the River Fleet appearing prominently. Like the first plate, the reverse had been used for a painting of the Tower of Babel, in this case dated to c. 1630 but again attributed to a member of the circle of Marten van Valckenborch.

== Dating evidence ==
The Copperplate map is not explicitly dated, but the original survey can be dated with some precision to between 1553 and 1559 from internal evidence. Key points include the following:

- Shrewsbury Place, on the riverfront (eastern City plate), is named as such. Previously known as Coldharbour House, this house was given to the Earl of Shrewsbury and renamed in 1553.
- A free-standing cross in the churchyard of St Botolph-without-Bishopsgate (Moorfields plate) is shown: this was removed in 1559.
- All Hallows, Bread Street (western City plate) is shown with its spire. The spire was struck by lightning in 1559, and taken down shortly afterwards.
- St Paul's Cathedral (western City plate) is shown with its spire. The spire was lost in a fire in 1561.
- The Royal Exchange does not appear (its location is on the eastern City plate). This major City landmark was erected between 1566 and 1570 and opened in 1571.

What is thought to be the Copperplate map is mentioned in a letter from the cartographer Nicholas Reynolds to Abraham Ortelius, dated 1562–3.

== Gallery ==
Copper plates held in the Museum of London

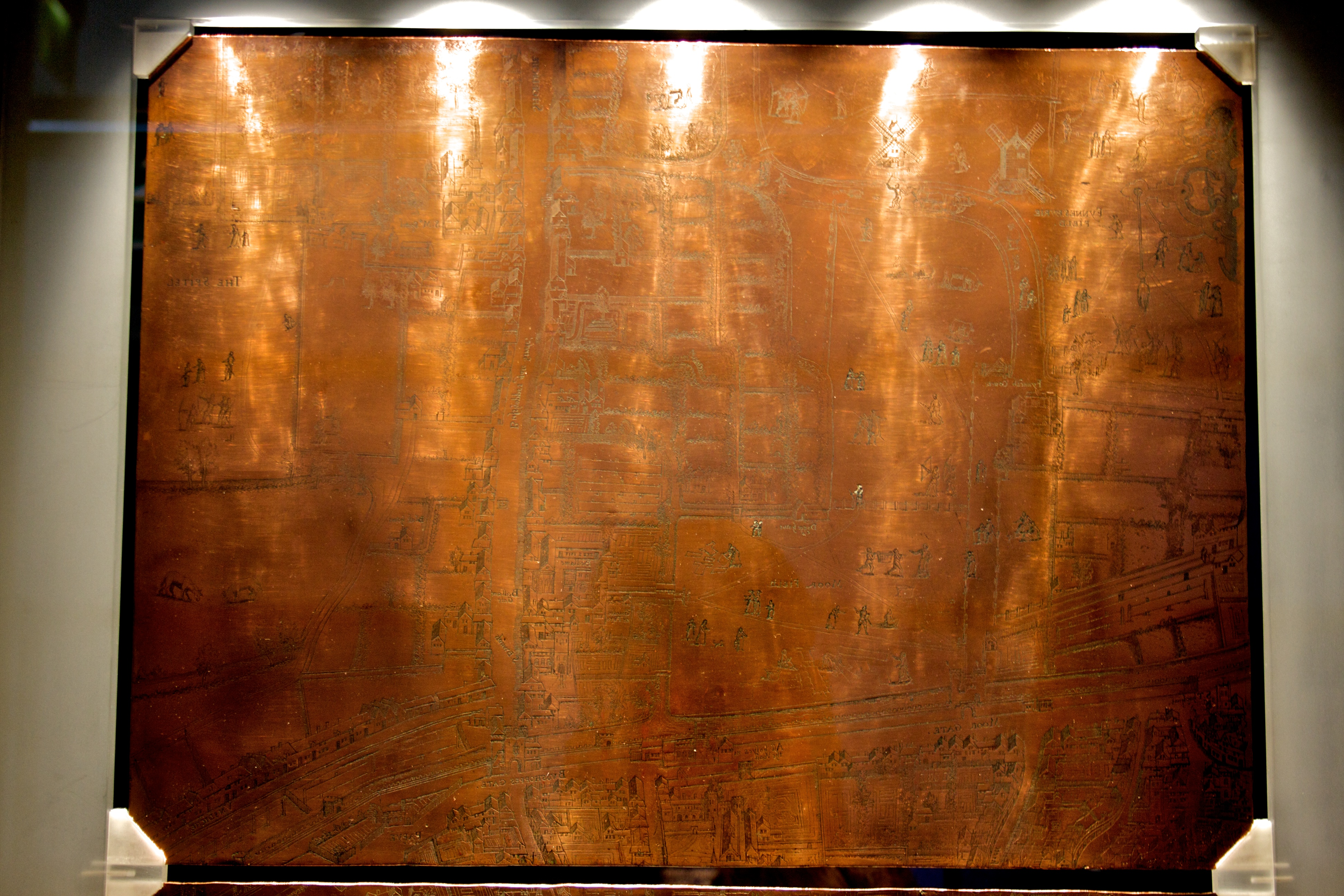
Moorfields plate: printing surface

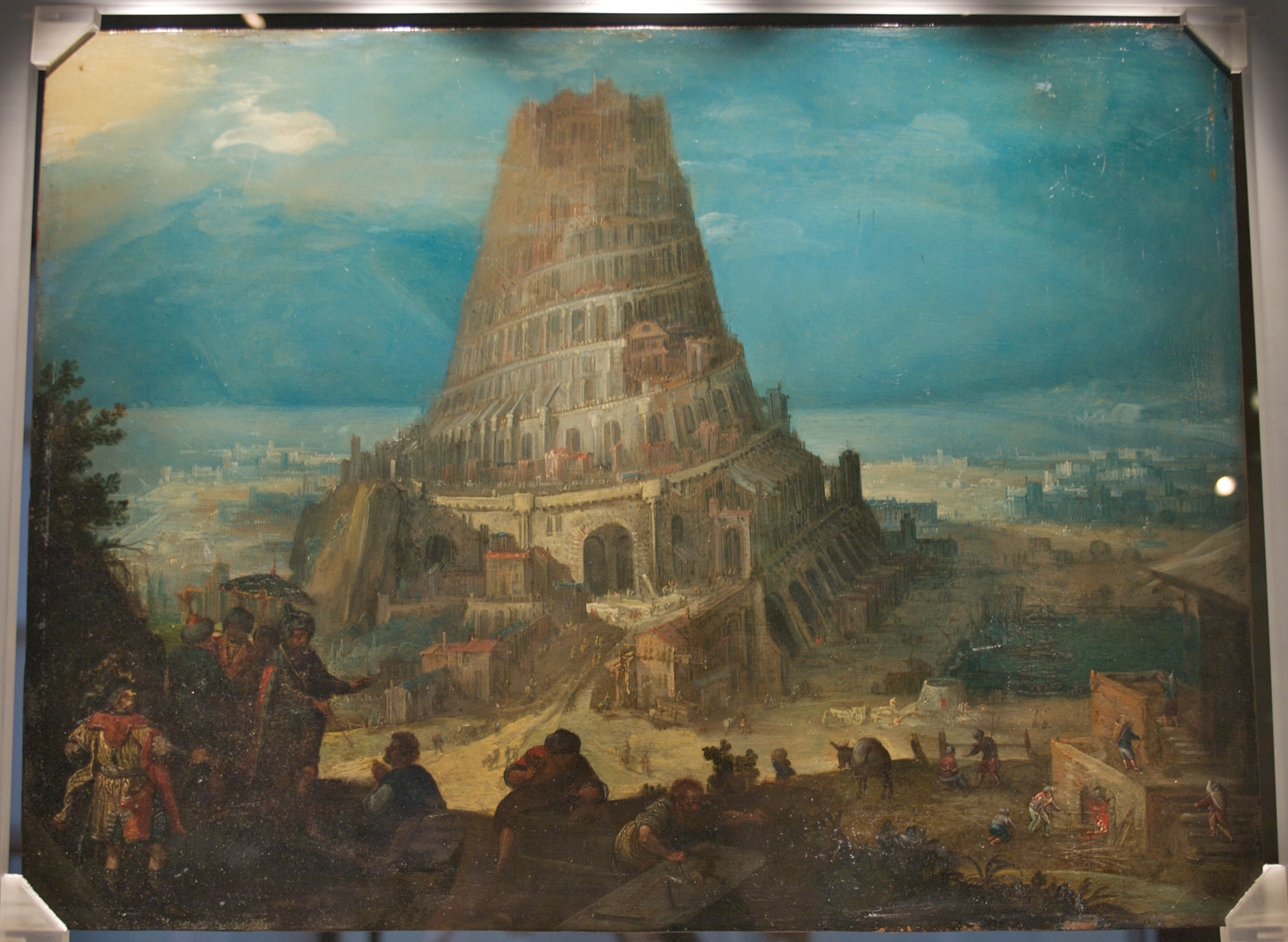
Moorfields plate, reverse: The Tower of Babel, c. 1600

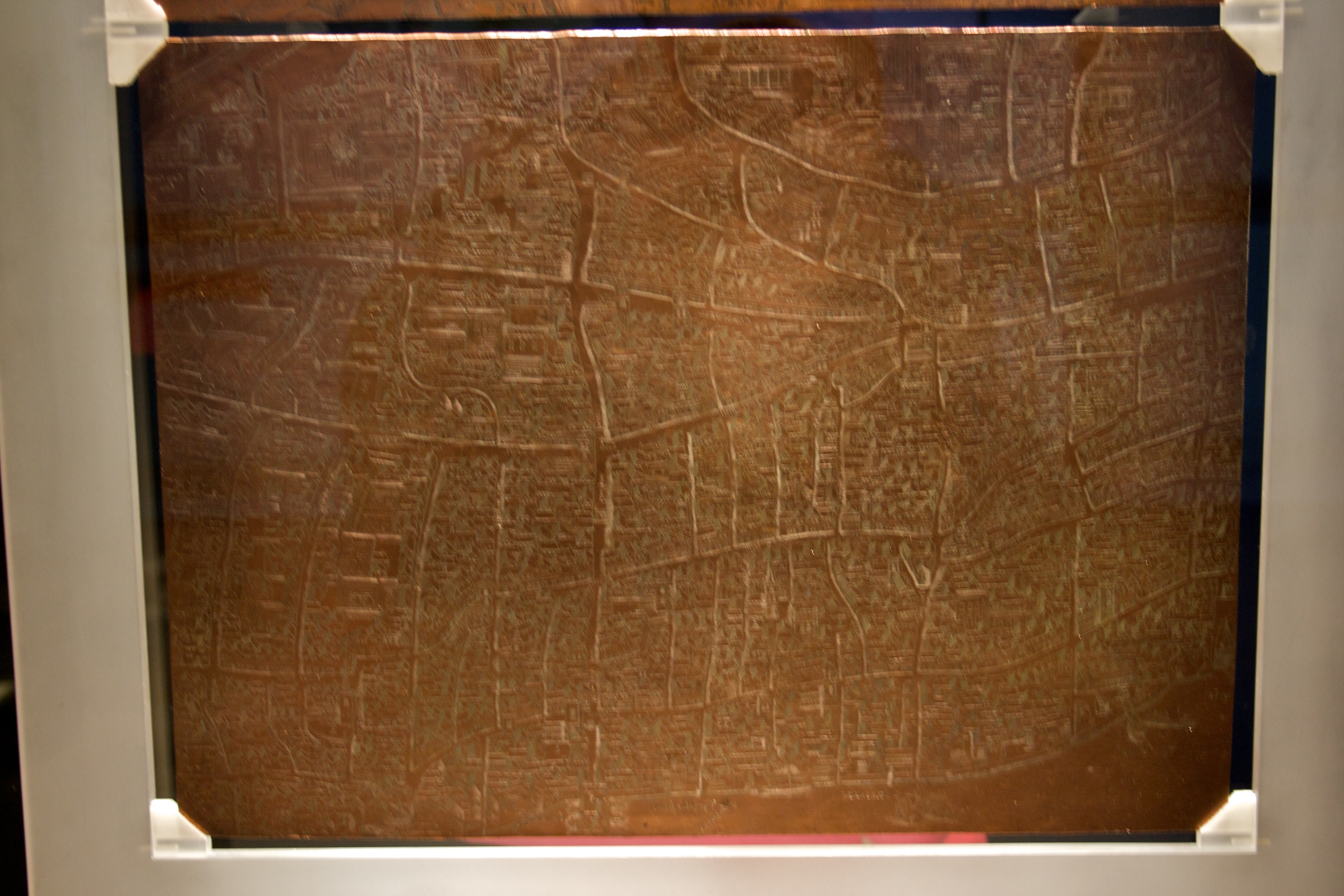
Eastern City plate: printing surface

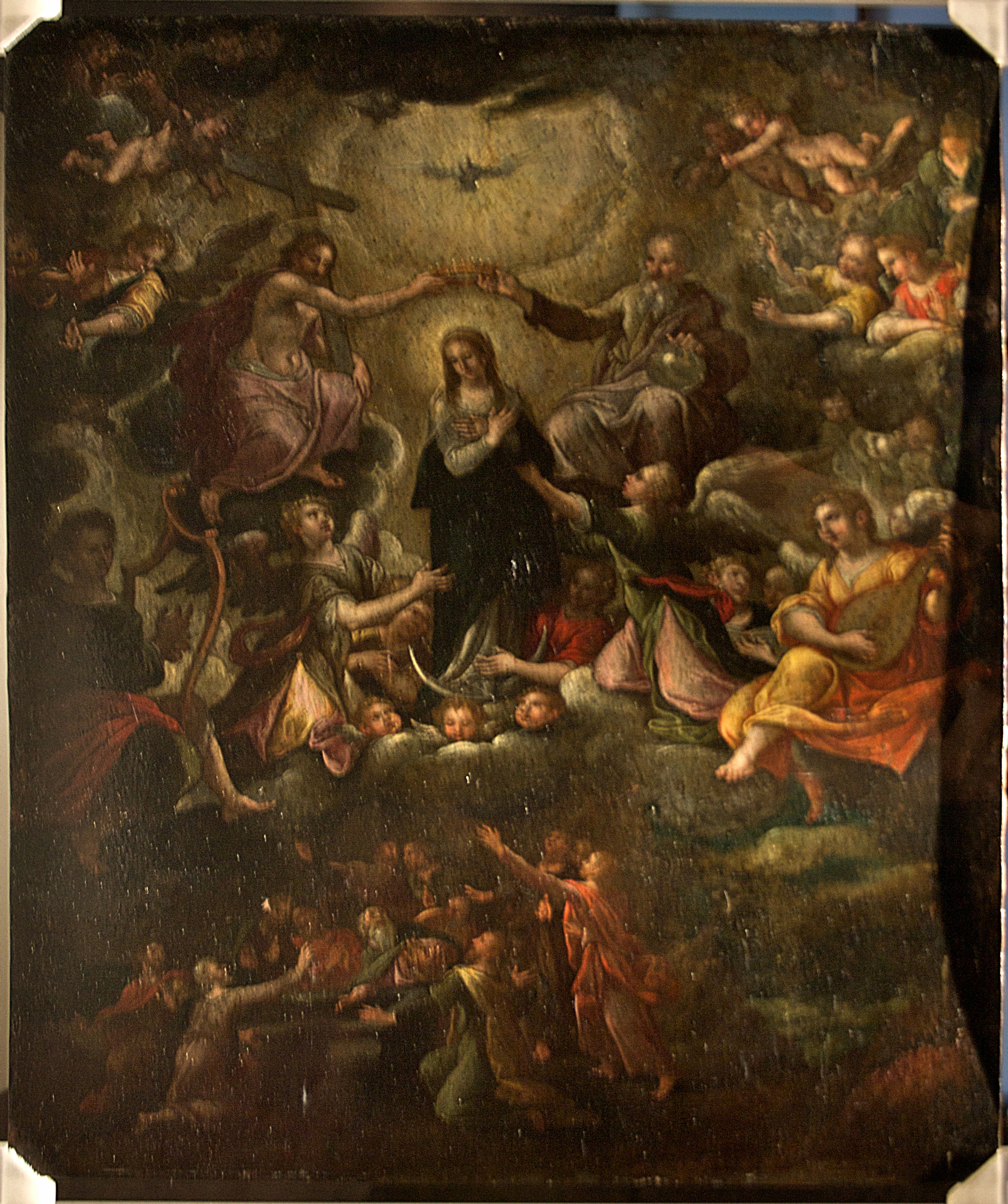
Eastern City plate, reverse: The Coronation and Assumption of the Virgin, c. 1600

== Bibliography ==
- Holmes, Martin Rivington, ed. (1963). Moorfields in 1559: an engraved copper plate from the earliest known map of London. London: London Museum. ISBN 0-11-290106-9. (Includes reproduction of the first plate.)
- Holmes, Martin Rivington (1966). "An unrecorded map of London". Archaeologia. 100. Society of Antiquaries of London: 102–28.
- Marks, Stephen Powys, ed. (1964). The Map of Mid Sixteenth Century London. London Topographical Society. Vol. 100. London: London Topographical Society. (Includes reproduction of the first plate.)
- Prockter, Adrian; Taylor, Robert; Fisher, John, eds. (1979). The A to Z of Elizabethan London. London Topographical Society. Vol. 122. London: London Topographical Society. ISBN 0-902087-15-0. (Includes reproductions of the first two plates.)
- Saunders, Ann; Schofield, John, eds. (2001). Tudor London: a map and a view. London Topographical Society. Vol. 159. London: London Topographical Society. ISBN 0-902087-45-2. (Includes reproductions of all three plates.)
  - Schofield, John (2001). "I. An introduction to the three known sheets of the Copperplate Map". In Saunders, Ann; Schofield, John (eds.). Tudor London: a map and a view. London Topographical Society. Vol. 159. London: London Topographical Society. pp. 1–6. ISBN 0-902087-45-2.
  - Marks, Stephen Powys (2001). "II. Dating the Copperplate Map and its first derivatives". In Saunders, Ann; Schofield, John (eds.). Tudor London: a map and a view. London Topographical Society. Vol. 159. London: London Topographical Society. pp. 7–15. ISBN 0-902087-45-2.
  - Barber, Peter (2001). "III. The Copperplate Map in context". In Saunders, Ann; Schofield, John (eds.). Tudor London: a map and a view. London Topographical Society. Vol. 159. London: London Topographical Society. pp. 16–32. ISBN 0-902087-45-2.
- "Unique Copper Plate of London Fetches £50,000". The Map Collector. 32: 48. 1985.
