= Woodcut map of London =

Map of the City of London created in 1560s

The Woodcut map of London in the collection of The London Archives

The "Woodcut" map of London, formally titled Civitas Londinum, and often referred to as the "Agas" map of London, is one of the earliest true maps (as opposed to panoramic views, such as those of Anton van den Wyngaerde) of the City of London and its environs. The original map probably dated from the early 1560s, but it survives only in later and slightly modified copies. It was printed from woodcut blocks on eight sheets, and in its present state measures approximately 2 feet 4 inches (71 cm) high by 6 feet (180 cm) wide. There has been some damage to the blocks, and it was probably originally fractionally larger.

The Woodcut map is a slightly smaller-scale, cruder and lightly modified copy of the so-called "Copperplate" map, surveyed between 1553 and 1559, which, however, survives only in part. It also bears a close resemblance to the map of London included in Georg Braun and Frans Hogenberg's Civitates Orbis Terrarum, published in Cologne and Amsterdam in 1572, although this is on a greatly reduced scale.

The Woodcut map was traditionally attributed to the surveyor and cartographer Ralph Agas, but this attribution is now considered to be erroneous.

== Impressions ==
Three impressions of the Woodcut map survive in its earliest known state of c. 1633. They are held in The London Archives, the Pepys Library at Magdalene College, Cambridge, and The National Archives at Kew.

== Date and creation ==
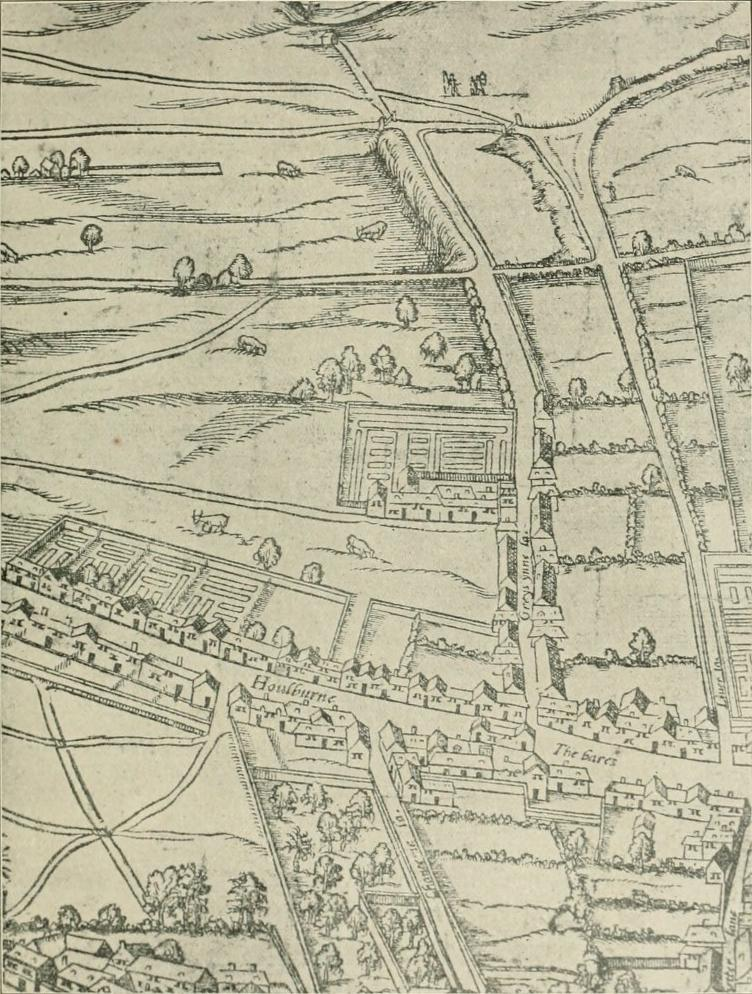
Detail from the map showing Gray's Inn

The three early copies of the map are dated by an inscription to c. 1633. (Note: The inscription does not include an explicit date, but dates the foundation of London to 1130 BC, and gives the city's present age as 2,763 years.) However, it is evident that the map in this form has been updated from an earlier state. The royal arms in the upper left corner are those of the House of Stuart (1603–49), but are clearly an insertion, almost certainly replacing the earlier Tudor arms, which do appear (at a very small scale) on the royal barge, pictured on the Thames. Similarly, the Royal Exchange (erected 1566–70; opened 1571) appears on the map, but is again clearly an insertion. The map is now known to be a close – though slightly less detailed – copy of the "Copperplate" map, surveyed between 1553 and 1559; but one difference between the two maps is that St Paul's Cathedral appears on the Woodcut version without its spire. The spire was lost in a fire in 1561, and so the map cannot be earlier than that date. The Woodcut map is therefore now dated with a reasonable degree of probability to the 1560s. A reference in the Stationers' Register for 1562–3 to the "Carde of London" may possibly refer to it.

The map has also been slightly modified from the Copperplate map by the introduction of a higher degree of perspective to the projection: this is particularly obvious in the northern and western areas (beyond Bishopsgate towards Shoreditch, and in the Westminster and Whitehall area). It is therefore closer to a bird's-eye view of the City, seen from an imaginary viewpoint above the south bank of the Thames, as opposed to the "bird's-flight view" projection of the Copperplate map. Stephen Powys Marks suggests that this adjustment "may be an indication of an appeal to a less sophisticated public than that which would buy the fine copper engraving".

=== Attribution to Agas ===
The Woodcut map was traditionally attributed to the surveyor and cartographer Ralph Agas (c. 1540–1621). This attribution has its roots in a claim made by Agas in 1588 to the effect that for ten years past he had been hoping to undertake a survey of London. On the basis of this statement, the late 17th-century engraver of a copy of the map on pewter sheets associated Agas's name with it; and the attribution was then asserted more firmly by the antiquary George Vertue in 1737–8. However, the probable date of the Woodcut map and its relationship to the Copperplate map make it extremely unlikely that Agas – who began practising as a surveyor in about 1566 – played any part in its creation, and the attribution is now treated as highly dubious. Nevertheless, the map is still often referred to as the "Agas" map.

== Reproductions ==
=== Print ===
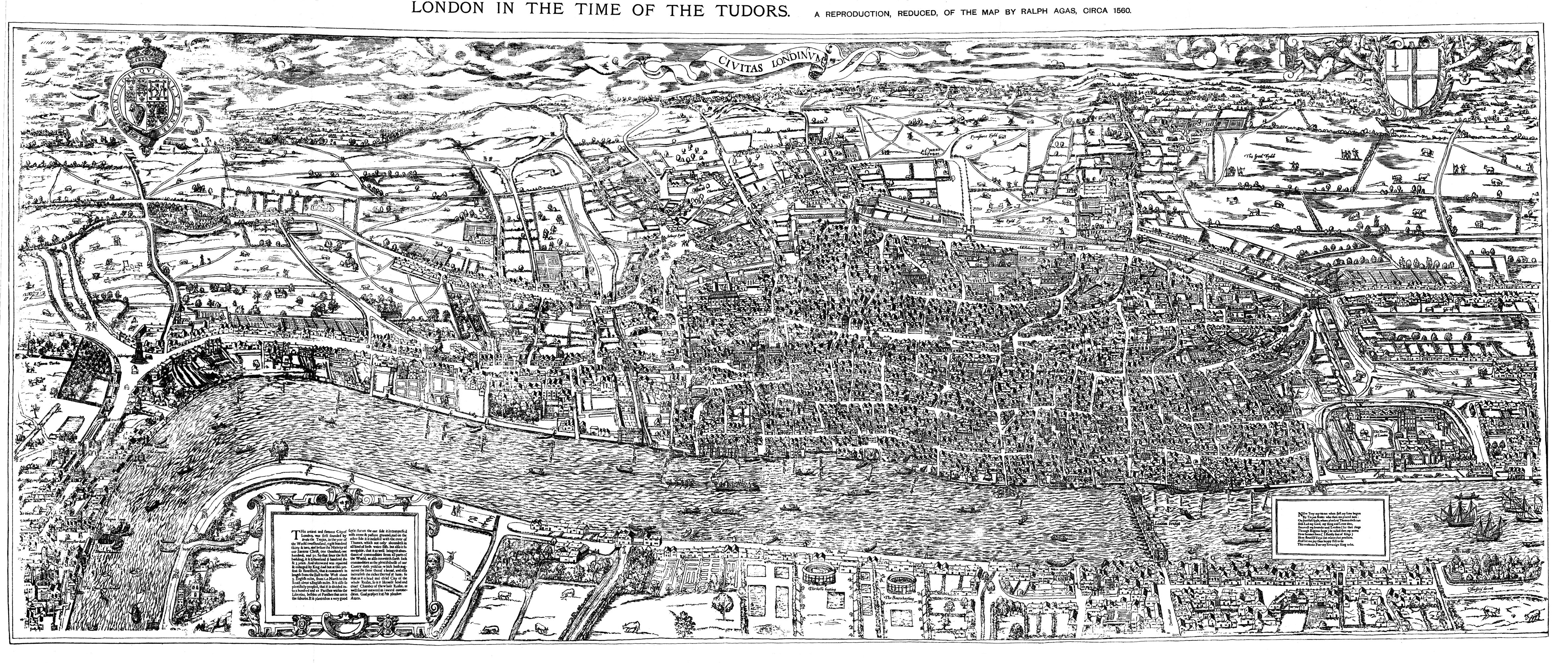
The 1874 facsimile

Reproductions of the map have been published on several occasions in modern times. An edition based on the "pewter" copy was published by Taperell & Innes in 1849. A facsimile edition was published in 1874, with an introduction by W. H. Overall. In 1979, the map was published in large-format atlas form by the London Topographical Society (in association with Harry Margary and Guildhall Library) as The A to Z of Elizabethan London, overprinted with street names and a basic grid, and with introductory notes by John Fisher and a comprehensive index.

=== Online ===
A zoomable online digitised version of the map is published by British History Online; and another version, with significant sites marked, as the "Map of Early Modern London" hosted by the University of Victoria. The map is also available to view on Layers of London.

== Bibliography ==
- Marks, Stephen Powys, ed. (1964). The Map of Mid Sixteenth Century London: An investigation into the relationship between a copper-engraved map and its derivatives. London Topographical Society. Vol. 100. London: London Topographical Society.
- Mitton, Geraldine Edith (1908). "Civitas Londinum". Maps of Old London. London: Adam & Charles Black. p. 8.
- Prockter, Adrian; Taylor, Robert; Fisher, John, eds. (1979). The A to Z of Elizabethan London. London Topographical Society. Vol. 122. London: London Topographical Society. ISBN 0-902087-15-0.
- Saunders, Ann; Schofield, John, eds. (2001). Tudor London: a map and a view. London Topographical Society. Vol. 159. London: London Topographical Society. ISBN 0-902087-45-2.
