= Sarah Simblet =

British botanical illustrator

Sarah Simblet (born 1972) is a graphic artist, writer and broadcaster, who teaches anatomical drawing at the Ruskin School of Drawing and Fine Art and at the University of Oxford.

== Early life and education ==
Sarah earned a doctorate in drawing at Bristol University in 1998 on European art history and the social history of human dissection. She was awarded the Richard Ford Award travelling scholarship to Spain while an undergraduate at Christ Church, Oxford between 1991 and 1994, and spent three months working in Madrid from November 1994 to January 1995.

== Career ==
Sarah started drawing at a very young age. Besides tutoring at Oxford, she is a guest lecturer at Barts and The London School of Medicine and Dentistry, teaching morphological anatomy and physiology from an art perspective to medical students. She also works with youth offenders at Feltham Prison and children in care in Oxfordshire. In addition, she works from a studio in Oxford. Besides taking part in group exhibitions, she has exhibited in one-artist shows such as "Sarah Simblet-Drawings" at the Pitville Gallery in Cheltenham (1999), "Theaters of the Body" at Chris Church Picture Gallery in Oxford (1998), and "Five New Drawings" at the Long Room, New College, Oxford (1993).

She has written three books which were published by Dorling Kindersley - ‘Anatomy for the Artist, ‘The Drawing Book’ and ‘Botany for the Artist. Her drawings are to be found in national and private collections including the Royal Academy of Art in London, and the Ashmolean in Oxford. She is a regular contributor to BBC radio and television programmes on natural history and art.

In collaboration with Gabriel Hemery, she co-wrote "The New Sylva - a discourse of forest and orchard trees in the 21st century" published by Bloomsbury Publishing in 2014 to mark the 350th anniversary of John Evelyn's work "Sylva, or A Discourse of Forest-Trees and the Propagation of Timber". The 200 illustrations for this book necessitated lengthy trips to the native haunts of the trees and drawing them in situ or returning with specimens to her studio in Wootton, West Oxfordshire.

== Popular culture ==
The work of art by Leonardo da Vinci titled La Bella Principessa was submitted to her for making a master copy in a PBS programme broadcast in 2012, in which Simblet appeared and was interviewed. Leonardo work of art was studied on the PBS program NOVA in 2012 in a programme titled “Mystery of a Masterpiece,” from NOVA/National Geographic/PBS, broadcast on 25 January 2012.

== Books ==
- Dorling Kindersley Publisher, ‘Anatomy for the Artist.
- Dorling Kindersley Publisher, ‘The Drawing Book’.
- Dorling Kindersley Publisher, ‘Botany for the Artist.
- Bloomsbury Publishers, Illustrated book, 'The New Syvla', 2016.

== See also ==
- Anatomical fugitive sheet
