= Edward Aggas =

English bookseller, printer, and translator

Edward Aggas (fl. 1564–1601) was an English bookseller, printer, and translator.

== Early life ==
Aggas was the son of Robert Aggas, of Stoke-near-Nayland, in Suffolk, and most likely a relative of Ralph Aggas, who was a native of the same area.

== Career ==
Aggas was apprenticed to Humphrey Toy, stationer and citizen of London, for nine years, from Easter 1564, and probably took his freedom of the company about the period covered by the break in the records. We find him taking apprentices himself in 1577 and 1580, and down to 1601 his name appears from time to time in the registers (Arber's Transcript, vols. ii and iii). He brought out many theological works and translations from the French; to some of the latter the letters E. A. are affixed, giving rise to the opinion that they were translated by Aggas himself. Ames says that he was more of a bookseller than printer, and dwelt at the sign of the Dragon in the west end of St. Paul's Churchyard. His device was a wyvern rising out of a ducal coronet, being the arms of the Cliffords, earls of Cumberland. His son, Elmore Aggas, was apprenticed to Gregory Seton for eight years, from 1 November 1603.
