= Anatomical fugitive sheet =

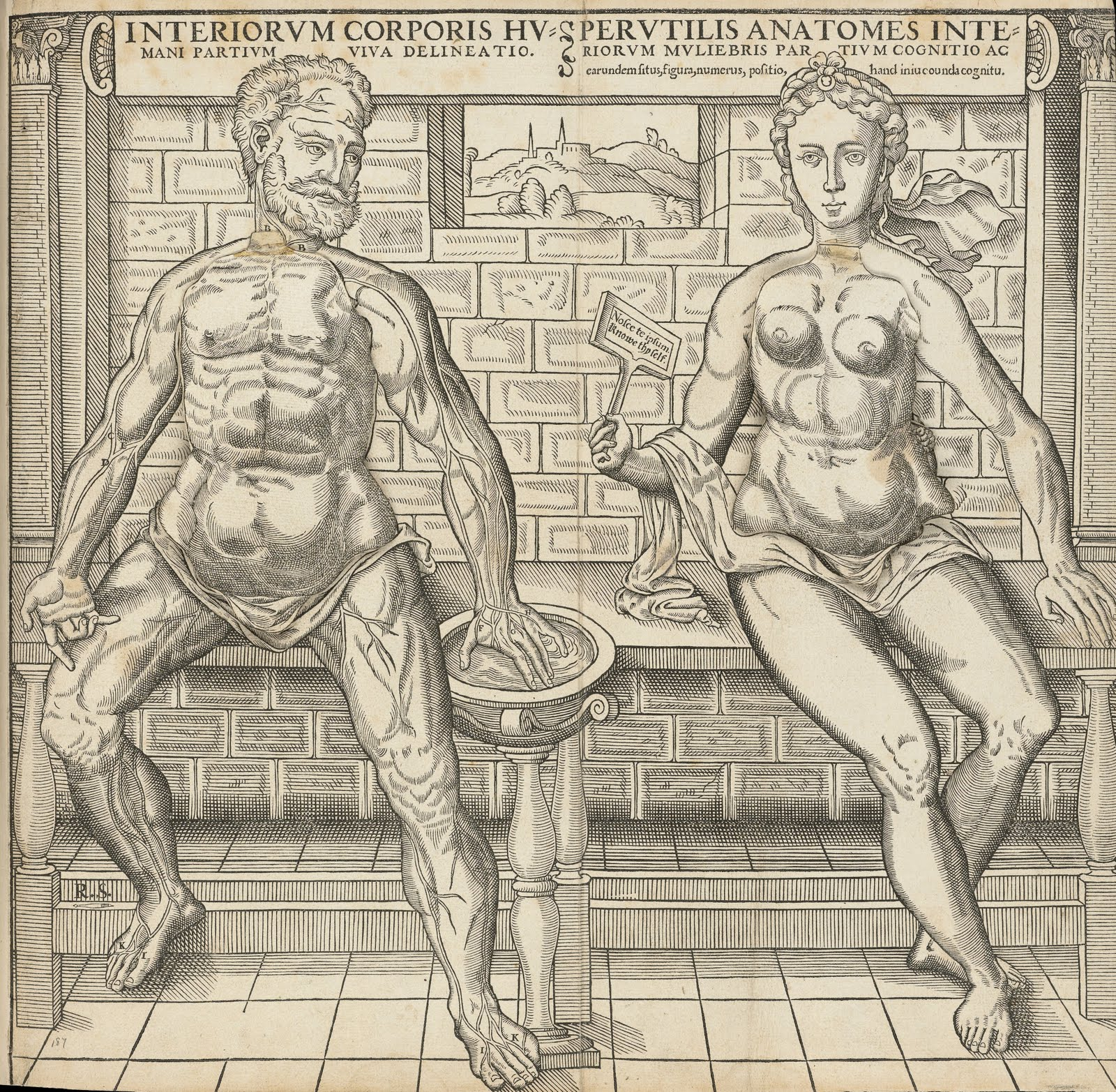
Anatomical fugitive sheet

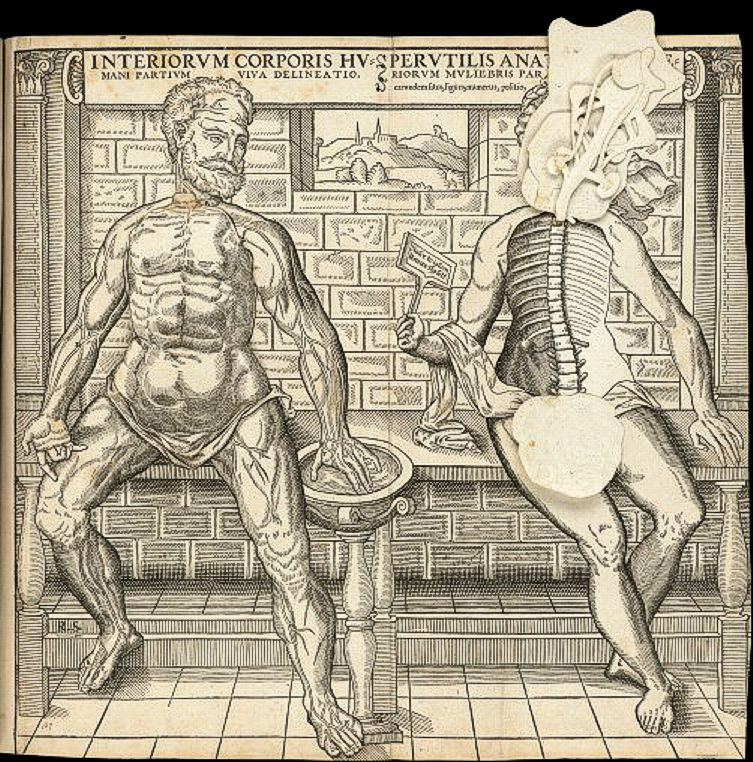
Anatomical fugitive sheet with flaps lifted on female figure

Anatomical fugitive sheets are illustrations of the human body specially created to display internal organs and structures. Hinged flaps enable the viewer to see a body as if in various stages of dissection. They appeared for the first time in the 16th century and became popular as instructional aids. The parts were labelled, making it easier for lay students to understand the workings of the human body.

The earliest known examples of these sheets were published in Strasbourg by the engraver and printer Heinrich Vogtherr in 1538, and probably existed in great numbers although very few have survived. Jean Ruel, a French botanist and physician, published his own anatomical sheets in 1539. Andreas Vesalius published his anatomical work on the human body, De humani corporis fabrica, four years later in 1543. His Tabulae anatomicae sex had appeared in 1538 showing skeletons and viscera, and differ substantially from the Ruel plates.

Thomas Geminus, a pseudonym for Thomas Lambrit, was another engraver and printer, who freely copied the anatomical drawings of Vesalius, a practice which infuriated him into denouncing 'extremely inept imitators'. Geminus did however redraw and rearrange Vesalius' woodcut illustrations, choosing to use engraved copperplates, with which he was more familiar. Gyles Godet, a French printer/publisher, worked in London from the end of the 1540s until his death in the 1570s. He also made use of Vesalius' diagrams, though crediting the Flemish anatomist.

A letter in the British National Archives is from Edmund Bonner, the English ambassador at the court of Francis I in Paris and future bishop of London. He wrote to Arthur Plantagenet, deputy of Calais, in 1539 sending him a gift of Ruel's woodcuts of a man and women.

The fugitive sheet practice is one that was used at various times in the 1800s: such as Edward William Tuson's A supplement to myology, (London 1828), Gustave Joseph Witkowski's Anatomie iconoclastique (Paris 1874-1876) and Étienne Rabaud's Anatomie élémentaire du corps humain (Paris 1900). More recently Jonathan Miller's pop-up book The human body (London 1983), employed the same principle.

== See also ==
- Medical illustrator
