= Thomas Gardner (antiquary) =

English antiquary

Thomas Gardner (1690 – 30 March 1769) was an English antiquary. He was particularly interested in Dunwich in Suffolk, a town mostly lost to coastal erosion, and published a history in 1754.

== Life ==
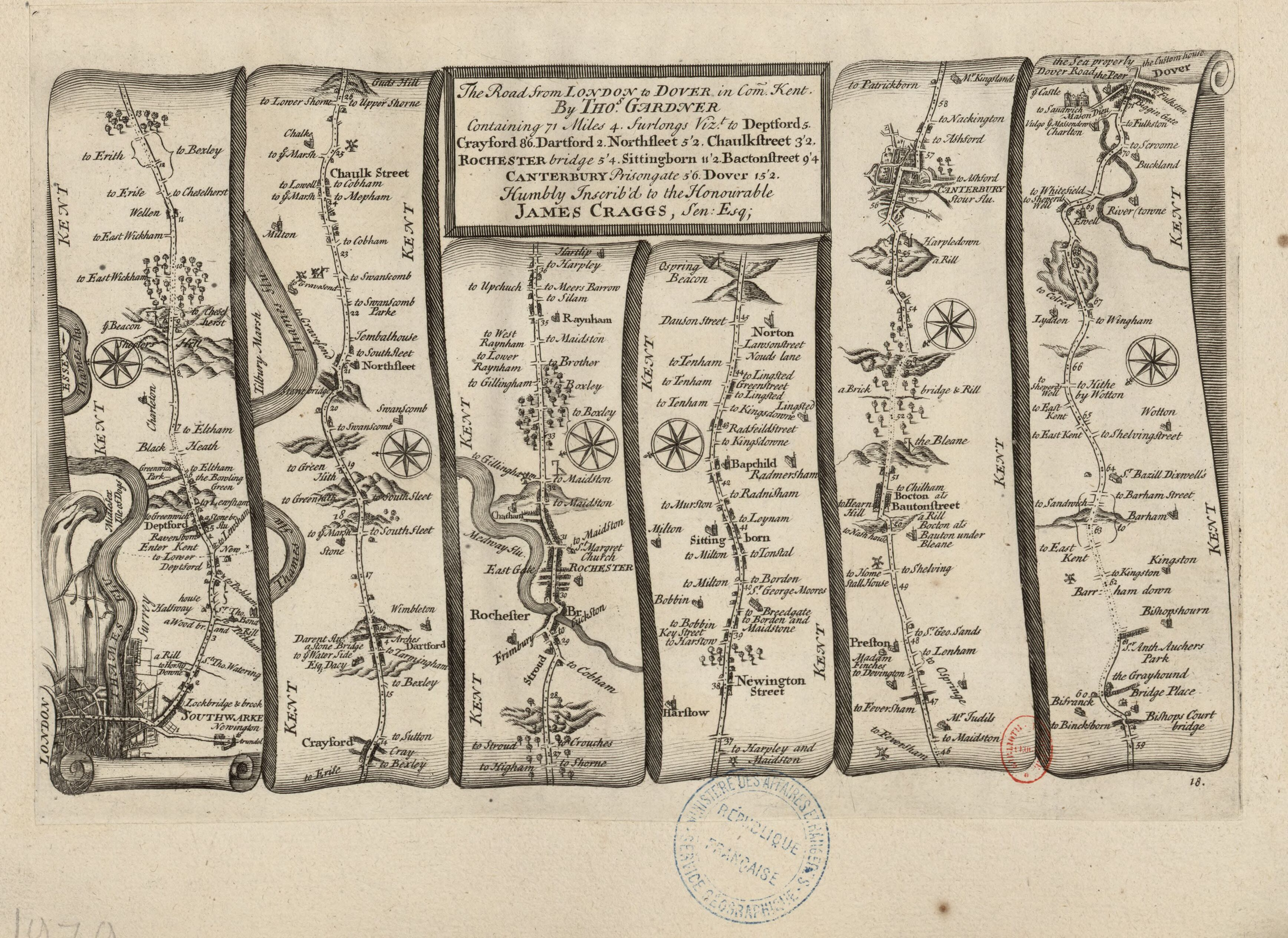
The road from London to Dover, in A Pocket-Guide to the English Traveller (1719)

It is thought Gardner was born in Ombersley, Worcestershire, and brought up in Southwold, Suffolk. He trained in London to be an engraver, and practiced there. In 1719 he published A Pocket-Guide to the English Traveller, containing 100 road maps; it was the first small-scale edition of John Ogilby's Britannia of 1675.

He moved to Southwold, where he collected salt tax and was deputy comptroller. He was an intelligent antiquary, making numerous local discoveries, and accumulating large collections, particularly of coins. In 1745 he exhibited to the Society of Antiquaries "A true and exact platt, containing the boundaries of the town of Dunwich, and the entries of certain records and evidences, and some things now in variance made the 14th of March 1589, by Ralph Agas".

After much difficulty, since most of the town's records were lost, Gardner published in 1754 by subscription An Historical Account of Dunwich, antiently a city, now a borough; Blithburgh, formerly a town of note, now a village; Southwold, once a village, now a Town-corporate; with remarks on some places contiguous thereto. … Illustrated with copperplates. Prefixed to some copies is a modernised version of Agas's plan by Joshua Kirby. Agas's report of the state of the town and harbour referred to above is printed from the original manuscript then in Gardner's possession on pp. 20–2.

== Family ==
He married in London in 1713 Rachel Redshaw; they had ten children, of whom four lived to adulthood. After Rachel's death in 1729, he married in 1733, at Reydon in Suffolk, Mary Jordan; she died in 1759.

Gardner died in 1769, aged 79, and was buried in Southwold churchyard near the south aisle, between his two wives Rachel and Mary, with the following inscription:

Betwixt honour and virtue here doth lie
The remains of old antiquity.
