= Peter Lily =

Church of England clergyman

Peter Lily or Lilly (died 1615), archdeacon of Taunton, was son of Peter Lily, prebendary of Canterbury, and grandson of the grammarian William Lily. He was educated at Jesus College, Cambridge, where he became fellow, and graduated B.A., M.A., and D.D. He took holy orders, and was made rector of Fulham, Middlesex on 17 May 1598, prebendary of St. Paul's on 16 April 1599, rector of Hornsey, Middlesex on 1 November 1610, and archdeacon of Taunton, Somerset in October 1613 (Le Neve, Fasti, i. 168). He was nominated by James I among the first fellows of Chelsea College, and is named in the charter of its foundation on 8 May 1610. Lily was also a brother of the Savoy Chapel, where he died in 1615. His will, dated 22 February 1614–15, (Note: Until 1752, the legal year in England began on 25 March, Lady Day. Thus his will was made in the legal year 1614 but in the calendar year 1615.) was proved on 14 June 1615. He was buried in the chancel of the Savoy Chapel, where are also the tombstones of his wife (died 1 June 1627) and only daughter (died 10 October 1625). He published Conciones Duæ, London, 1619, and Two Sermons, London, 1619.

[Lansd. MS. 983, f. 52; Wood's Athenæ (Bliss), i. 34; Newcourt's Repert. i. 128, 587, 609; Faulkner's Chelsea, ii. 225; Cat. of the Bodleian Library.]
