= Ralph Agas =

Englist land surveyor (c. 1540–1621)

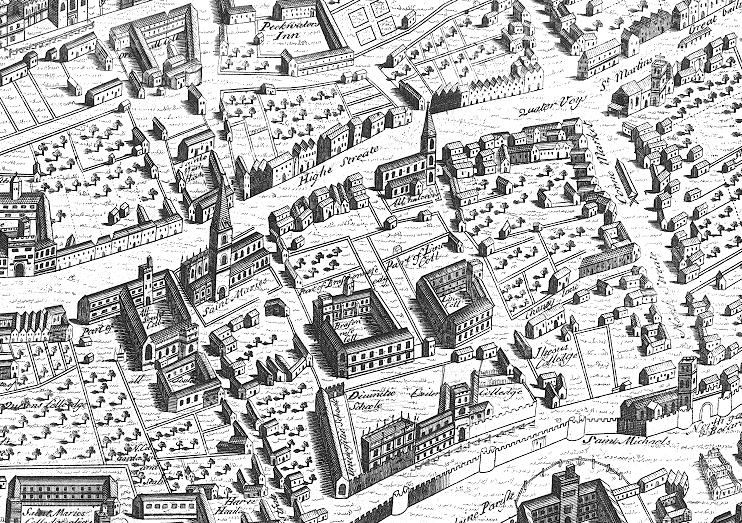
Part of Agas's map of Oxford (surveyed 1578; engraved 1588)

Ralph Agas (or Radulph Agas) (c. 1540 – 26 November 1621) was an English land surveyor and cartographer. He was born at Stoke-by-Nayland, Suffolk, in about 1540, and lived there throughout his life, although he travelled regularly to London. He began to practise as a surveyor in about 1566, and has been described as "one of the leaders of the emerging body of skilled land surveyors".

Agas is particularly known for his large-scale town map of Oxford (surveyed 1578, published 1588). Early maps of London and Cambridge were also formerly attributed to him, but these attributions are no longer upheld.

== Life ==
Agas was born in Stoke-by-Nayland, in Suffolk, probably between 1540 and 1545. By his own account, he began to practise as a land surveyor in about 1566. He is described at several points in his life as "deformed", "impotent", "lame" and a "cripple", but the precise nature of his disability is not known.

He was ordained, and served from 1578 to 1583 as rector of Gressenhall, Norfolk. He probably abandoned the church after this date in favour of his surveying career.

He appears always to have lived in Suffolk, but travelled regularly to London in term time to obtain orders for surveying work. During his visits he is known to have lodged at inns: in 1596 at the "Flower de Luce", next to the "Sun" near Fleet Bridge; and in 1606 at the sign of the "Helmet" in Holborn, at the end of Fetter Lane.

He died at Stoke-by-Nayland on 26 November 1621, and was buried there the next day.

== Maps ==
Agas's regular work consisted of drawing up local estate maps and surveys for a variety of clients. He was one of the first estate surveyors to move beyond the traditional practice of compiling purely written descriptions of landed property, and to consider supplementing these with measured maps. The earliest map that can be attributed to him is one of lands at West Lexham, Norfolk, dated 1575. He subsequently undertook commissions in Bedfordshire, Berkshire, Cambridgeshire, Essex, Gloucestershire, Norfolk, Oxfordshire, Suffolk and Surrey. An estate map he drew of Toddington, Bedfordshire, dated 1581, includes what Paul Harvey has described as "the best picture we have of a small Elizabethan country market-town". He appears to have been patronised by William Cecil, 1st Baron Burghley. Another client was Corpus Christi College, Oxford, although the college commissioned only written surveys rather than maps.

Agas is perhaps principally remembered for Oxonia Antiqua Restaurata, a detailed plan – really a "bird's-flight view" – of Oxford. It was drawn in 1578 and engraved and printed in 1588: a copy is held in the Bodleian Library, bequeathed by Richard Rawlinson. The plan was re-engraved by Robert Whittlesey in 1728, at the expense of the university, but this plate was destroyed in the fire at John Nichol's printing-works in 1808.

A town plan of Dunwich in Suffolk is also attributed to Agas. This was engraved for Thomas Gardner's history of the town (1744). The original later came into the possession of the Suffolk antiquary David Elisha Davy.

=== Spurious attributions ===
The important early map of London now conventionally known as the "Woodcut" map has traditionally been attributed to Agas. A verse inscribed on the 1588 engraving of Agas's map of Oxford included a claim to the effect that for ten years past he had been hoping to undertake a survey of London, but had not done so. On the dubious evidence of this statement, a link with the Woodcut map was first made by the late 17th-century engraver of a copy of it on pewter sheets; and in 1737–8 George Vertue attributed it confidently and unambiguously to Agas. However, the claim is no longer sustained: the Woodcut map is now dated to the early 1560s, and is known to be based on the slightly earlier "Copperplate" map of the 1550s, making it highly unlikely that Agas played any part in its creation. Nevertheless, the Woodcut map is still often referred to as the "Agas" map.

A map of Cambridge printed in 1592 (of which a unique copy survives in the Bodleian Library) has also been attributed to Agas, but is now thought more likely to be by John Hamond.

== Writings ==
=== Advertisements ===
Agas produced several documents to publicise his services to potential clients. The longest is a published 20-page pamphlet entitled A Preparative to Platting of Landes and Tenements for Surveigh (1596), in which he advertises his methods of surveying (including the use of the theodolite), defends the practical advantages to the landlord of having a map of his property, and condemns the less scientific techniques of untrained surveyors. He praises the convenience and accuracy of the theodolite over the older surveying technology of the plane table. He concludes by saying that he hopes to write a more extended technical treatise on the subject.

A shorter advertisement is printed on a single quarto half-sheet, and is undated. Agas asserts that he has more than forty years experience in survey work, a perfect knowledge of customary tenures and titles of all kinds, and that he is a good penman and well acquainted with old records. He again emphasises the advantages to be gained by a landlord in employing an experienced surveyor, as a means of combating the "abuse in concealments, incroachments etc." that has arisen in recent years.

Another advertisement is in manuscript, and is dated 17 November 1606. Here Agas claims, besides his knowledge of surveying, the ability to read old records, to restore any that are worn, "obliterated, or dimmed," and to make calendars of them. He can find the weight and measure of any solid body. He is clever at arithmetic, and skilled "in writing smaule, after the skantelinge & proportion of copiynge the Oulde & New Testamentes seven tymes in one skinne of partchmente, without anie woorde abbreviate or contracted, which maie also serve for drawinge discriptions of contries into volumes portable in verie little cases". He has a recipe for the preservation of the eye; can remove and replant trees of a ton weight without injury; and has forty years' experience in his profession.

=== Other documents ===
Further original documents written by Agas survive among the Lansdowne and Additional manuscripts in the British Library. One is a letter dated 22 February 1593, addressed to Lord Burghley. It is entitled "A Noate for the Perfection of Lande Measure, and exact Plattinge of Cities, Castels, Honors, Lordshippes, Maners, and Landes of all sortes". In this account of the techniques of land-surveying, Agas writes of the "profitable staff" and the theodolite of some 20 inches in diameter, with a protractor of one foot at least. He adds that "the measure attendinge uppon this instrument is of steele wier toe pole longe lincked foote by foote, excepte the halfe foot at either ende." In another letter to Burghley of 1597, Agas writes of his labours in the Fens of eastern England, and states how he had plotted out the ground, gauged the quantity of the waters, the ebbs and flows, and the daily abuses of the landholders. He thanks Burghley for bounties already bestowed, but also alludes to a considerable sum still owing to him for his services.

Another manuscript, dated 1606, comprises an opinion given by Agas to the commissioners appointed to inquire into the question of concealed lands belonging to the Crown. This marks his last known professional appearance.

Agas's "Supervisio Manerii de Comerde Magna, alias Abbas Haule, co. Suff.", a survey of the manor of Great Cornard, Suffolk, is in the British Library.

== Legal disputes ==
At several points in his life Agas became embroiled in legal disputes. He appears to have been a radical Protestant, eager to challenge the abuse of power by members of the Suffolk "establishment", and to have been unpopular with many of his neighbours.

In 1582, when rector of Gressenhall, he complained to the Privy Council about a parish campaign of persecution against him which had brought him into discredit with his bishop.

In 1589 he became caught up in a feud with Sir William Waldegrave, the chief landowner of Stoke by Nayland, after accusing Sir William, Lady Waldegrave, and others – with some justification – of offences including sedition and recusancy. Agas was convicted of slander by the Court of King's Bench and imprisoned for several months. In 1595 he distributed copies of a document in which he aired his grievances in this matter to several influential members of the county community, but found himself indicted before the Court of Star Chamber on a charge of issuing seditious pamphlets. The outcome of this case is not known.

In 1598, he was again brought before Star Chamber, in connection with a dispute over the inheritance of the estates of a neighbour, John Payne, in which he sought to establish the Crown's rights of wardship. The legal dispute had soon turned to physical violence. In the bill presented to the court Agas and his two elder sons, Robert and Thomas, were described as the most pestilent fellows in the neighbourhood, and Agas himself as "one that in former times hath used the office of magister, and was sometymes parson of Dereham, in the county of Norfolk, being deprived of his benefice for his lewd life and bad conditions, and being deformed in shape and body as in conditions". The defendants responded that many of these allegations were absurd, ridiculous and untrue, and further, "that the same Radulph Agas was never a parson of Dereham in Norfolk, neyther had anything to do eyther with the church, personage, or minister there; neither was ever deprived from any church or benefice whatsoever, as is falsely and maliciously in the said bill suggested and intended. And touching the infirmity and bodily weakness of the same Radulph Agas, one of the defendants, he saith, that as he received the same by the providence of God in his mother's wombe, so hath he always with humble thanks to his Creator willingly borne and suffered that his infirmity". The outcome of the case is again not known, but Agas appears to have escaped long-term imprisonment through the intervention of Thomas Browne, the royal farmer of Payne's lands, who wrote to Robert Cecil (son of Lord Burghley) on his behalf.

== Personal life ==
Agas was married, but his wife's name is not known. He had at least three sons (including Robert and Thomas) and two daughters. He is believed to be related to Edward Aggas (fl. 1564–1601), an English bookseller, printer, and translator who was a native of the same area.

== Bibliography ==
Attribution

- This article incorporates text from a publication now in the public domain: Cooper, Thompson (1885). "Agas, Radulph". In Stephen, Leslie (ed.). Dictionary of National Biography. Vol. 1. London: Smith, Elder & Co. pp. 173–175.
- Bendall, Sarah (2004). "Agas, Radulph [Ralph] (c.1540–1621)". Oxford Dictionary of National Biography (online ed.). Oxford University Press. doi:10.1093/ref:odnb/207. (Subscription, Wikipedia Library access or UK public library membership required.)
- Delano-Smith, Catherine; Kain, Roger J. P. (1999). English Maps: a history. London: British Library. ISBN 0-7123-4609-0.
- Harvey, P. D. A. (1993). Maps in Tudor England. London: Public Record Office/British Library. ISBN 0-7123-0311-1.
- MacCulloch, Diarmaid (1975). "Radulph Agas: virtue unrewarded" (PDF). Proceedings of the Suffolk Institute of Archaeology. 33 (3): 275–84.
- Steer, Francis; Eden, Peter; Bendall, Sarah, eds. (1997). "Agas, Ralph". Dictionary of Land Surveyors and Local Map-makers of Great Britain and Ireland, 1530–1850. Vol. 2 (2nd ed.). London: British Library. p. 4. ISBN 0712345094.
