= William Lily (grammarian) =

English classical grammarian and scholar (c. 1468–1522)

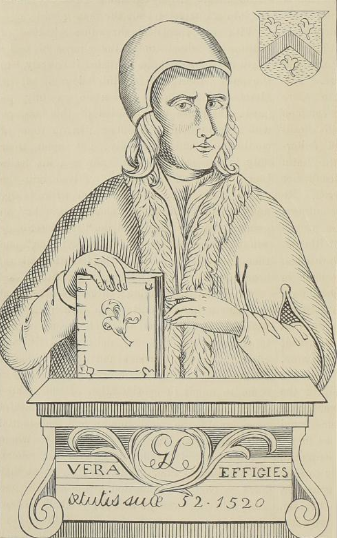
- William Lily, at the age of 52 in 1520
- Born: c. 1468
- Died: 25 February 1523 (aged 54)
- Resting place: Old St Paul's Cathedral; 51.513611°N 0.098333°W
- Education: Magdalen College, Oxford
- Occupations: Grammarian; Scholar
- Spouse: Agnes (died)
- Children: George Lily; Peter Lily; Dionysia Lily
- Relatives: John Lyly (grandson); Peter Lily

William Lily (or William Lilly or Lilye; c. 1468 – 25 February 1522) was an English classical grammarian and scholar. He was an author of the most widely used Latin grammar textbook in England and was the first high master of St Paul's School, London.

== Life ==
Lily was born about 1468 at Odiham, Hampshire, and he was admitted to Magdalen College, Oxford by November 1486. After graduating in arts he went on a pilgrimage to Jerusalem. On his return journey he put in at Rhodes, which was still occupied by the knights of St John, under whose protection many Greeks had taken refuge after the capture of Constantinople by the Turks. He then went on to Italy, where he attended the lectures of Angelus Sabinus, Sulpitius Verulanus and Pomponius Laetus at Rome, and of Egnatius at Venice.

After his return he settled in London—where he became friends with Thomas More—as a private teacher of grammar, and is believed to have been the first who taught Greek in that city. In 1510 John Colet, dean of St Paul's, who was then founding the school which afterwards became famous, appointed Lily the first high master in 1512. Colet's correspondence with Erasmus shows he first offered the position to the Dutchman, who refused it, before considering Lily. Ward and Waller ranked Lily "with Grocyn and Linacre as one of the most erudite students of Greek that England possessed". Lily's pupils included William Paget, John Leland, Antony Denny, Thomas Wriothesley and Edward North, 1st Baron North. The school became a paragon of classical scholarship.

== Family ==
At an unknown date, he married Agnes, by whom he had 15 children, including:

- George Lily, the cleric and cosmographer
- Peter Lily (d. 1596)
- Dionysia Lily, married firstly, John Rightwise (d. 1532), Lily's successor at St Paul's School, London; secondly, James Jacob, by whom she had a son named Polydore, ″probably so named after the historian, Polydore Vergil.″

His wife predeceased him at the age of 37, after 17 years of marriage; Agnes died on 11 August, but the year of her death is unknown. John Lyly, the dramatist, was a grandson, as was the clergyman, Peter Lily.

== Death ==
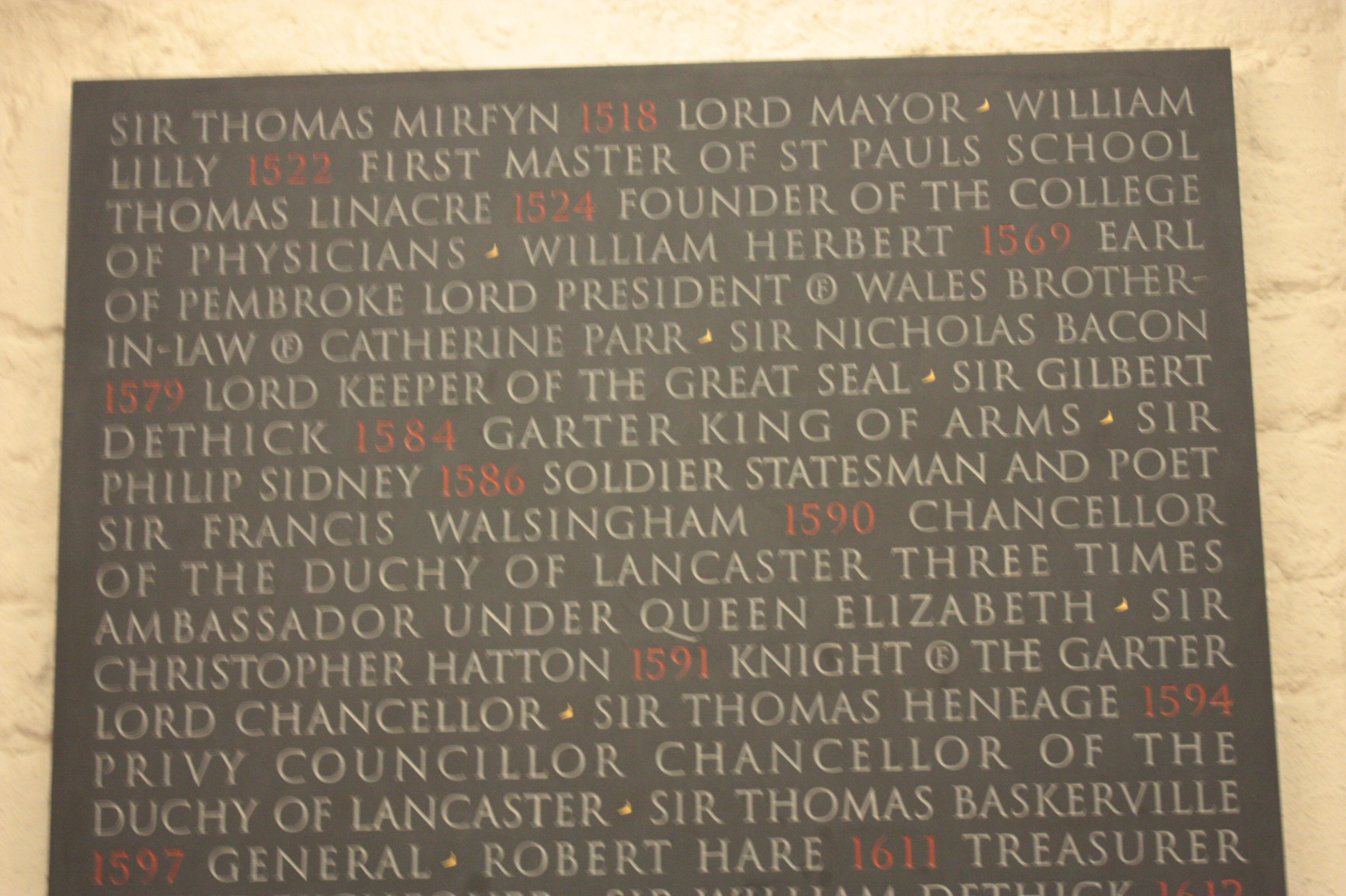
Lily's name listed on the Memorial to the graves lost in the Great Fire of London, St Paul's Cathedral

He died of the plague in London on 25 February 1522 and was buried in the north churchyard of Old St Paul's Cathedral. His son George had the brass plate from his parent's tomb, with the following inscription, affixed to the wall of St Paul's Cathedral near the North door:

Sacred to the Memory of William Lily, the first master of Paul's School, and of
Agnes, his wife, both buried together, in the consecrated ground, of this church-
yard that is now destroyed. George Lily, one of the canons of this church, piously
consulting the memory of his parents, has placed his memorial preserved by
friends, refixed it here. William Lily died the 5 March 1522 in his 54th
year.

Lily's grave and monument were destroyed in the Great Fire of London in 1666. A modern monument in the crypt lists his as one of the important graves lost.

== Works ==
Lily is famous not only as one of the pioneers of Greek learning, but as one of the joint-authors of a book, familiar to many generations of students up to the 19th century, the old Eton Latin Grammar or Accidence. This Brevissima Institutio, a sketch by Colet, corrected by Erasmus and worked upon by Lily, contains two portions the author of which is indisputably Lily. These are the lines on the genders of nouns, beginning Propria quae maribus, and those on the conjugation of verbs beginning As in praesenti. The Carmen de Moribus bears Lily's name in the early editions; but Thomas Hearne asserts that it was written by Leland, who was one of his scholars, and that Lily only adapted it. However Erasmus himself stated:

At Colet's command, this book was written by William Lily, a man of no ordinary skill, a wonderful craftsman in the instruction of boys. When he had completed his work, it was handed over to, nay rather thrust upon, me for emendation. easier for me to do). So that Lily (endowed as he is with too much modesty) did not permit the book to appear with his name, and I (with my sense of candour) did not feel justified that the book should bear my name when it was the work of another. Since both of us refused our names it was published anonymously, Colet merely commending it in a preface.

An edition published in 1534 was entitled Rudimenta Grammatices. Various other parts were added and a stable form finally appeared in 1540. In 1542 Henry VIII authorised it as the sole Latin grammar textbook to be used in education and schools; it has been suggested that Henry commissioned the book but the interval between initial publication and authorisation argue against this. With corrections and revisions, it was used for more than three hundred years. It was so widely used by Elizabethan scholars that Shakespeare was able to refer to it in the second scene of Act IV of Titus Andronicus, quote from it in the first scene of Act II of Henry IV, Part 1 ("Homo is a common name to all men") and allude to it in the first scene of Act IV of The Merry Wives of Windsor and scene 1 of Act IV of Much Ado about Nothing.

Part of the grammar is a poem, "Carmen de Moribus", which lists school regulations in a series of pithy sentences, using a broad vocabulary, and examples of most of the rules of Latin grammar that were part of an English grammar school curriculum. (See Latin mnemonics.) The poem is an early reinforcement of part of the reading list in Erasmus' De Ratione Studii of the Classical authors who should be included in the curriculum of a Latin grammar school. Specifically, the authors derived from Erasmus are Cicero, Terence, and Virgil.

When John Milton wrote his Latin grammar Accedence Commenc't Grammar (1669), over 60 percent of his 530 illustrative quotations were taken from Lily's grammar.

Besides the Brevissima Institutio, Lily wrote a variety of Latin pieces and translations from Greek, both in prose and verse. Some of the latter are printed along with the Latin verses of Sir Thomas More in Progymnasmata Thomae Mori et Gulielmi Lylii Sodalium (1518). Another volume of Latin verse (Antibossicon ad Gulielmum Hormannum, 1521) is directed against a rival schoolmaster and grammarian, Robert Whittington, who had "under the feigned name of Bossus, much provoked Lily with scoffs and biting verses."

A sketch of Lily's life by his son George Lily was written for Paulus Jovius, who was collecting for his history the lives of the learned men of Great Britain.

== Portraits ==
No authentic portrait of Lily survives, but a small engraving, dating from the 18th century, is thought to depict him. He is represented with his right hand resting on a closed book bearing a lily on the cover, to which his left hand points. Below is an inscription: Vera G L effigies ætatis suæ 52 · 1520. Above is a shield bearing a chevron between three lily heads. This may derive from a lost painting of Lily, which Sir Nicholas Bacon placed between those of Donatus and Servius in the ″little banquetting-house″ at Gorhambury, and it has served in turn to inspire the idealised figure of Lily, now in a stained glass panel of the south window of the Hall of Christ Church, Oxford.

== Sources ==
- Anders, Henry R. D. (1904). Shakespeare’s Books: A Dissertation on Shakespeare’s Reading and the Immediate Sources of His Works. Deutsche Shakespeare-Gesellschaft. Bd. 1. Berlin: Georg Reimer. pp. 13–16. OCLC 697900950.
- Audin, Jean-M.-Vincent; Browne, Edward G. Kirwan (1852). The Life of Henry the Eighth, and the History of the Schism of England. Translated from the French of M. Audin by Edward G. Kirwan Browne. London: Charles Dolman. OCLC 879558729.
- Carley, James P. (25 May 2006). "Leland, John (c. 1503–1552)". Oxford Dictionary of National Biography (online ed.). Oxford University Press. doi:10.1093/ref:odnb/16416. (Subscription, Wikipedia Library access or UK public library membership required.)
- Feuillerat, Albert (1910). John Lyly: Contribution à l'histoire de la Renaissance en Angleterre (in French). Cambridge: Cambridge University Press. OCLC 1474065230.
- Lily, William (1709). A Short Introduction of Grammar Generally to be Used; Compiled and Set Forth for the Bringing Up of All Those that Intend to Attain to the Knowledge of the Latin Tongue. To which are Added Usefull Observations by Way of Comment Out of Ancient and Late Grammarians. Oxford: At the Theater. OCLC 258041138.
- Lily, William (2013). Gwosdek, Hedwig (ed.). Lily's Grammar of Latin in English: An Introduction of the Eyght Partes of Speche, and the Construction of the Same. Oxford: Oxford University Press. ISBN 978-0-19-966811-3. OCLC 825557427.
- Lupton, Joseph Hirst (1893). "Lily, William". In Lee, Sidney (ed.). Dictionary of National Biography. Vol. 33. London: Smith, Elder & Co. pp. 264–266.
- Plimpton, George A. (1970) [1st pub. 1933]. The Education of Shakespeare: Illustrated from the Schoolbooks in Use in His Time. Library of Shakespearean Biography and Criticism. Series 3, pt. A. Freeport, N.Y.: Books for Libraries Press. ISBN 0836952677. OCLC 1417137382.
- Smith, R. D.; Gwosdek, Hedwig (11 June 2020). "Lily, William (1468?–1522/1523)". Oxford Dictionary of National Biography (online ed.). Oxford University Press. doi:10.1093/ref:odnb/16665. (Subscription, Wikipedia Library access or UK public library membership required.)
- Ward, A. W.; Waller, A. R., eds. (2000) [1st pub. Putnam:1907–21]. "I. Englishmen and the Classical Renascence, 8. William Lily". The Cambridge History of English and American Literature: An Encyclopedia in Eighteen Volumes. Vol. III: Renascence and Reformation. New York: Bartleby.com. OCLC 43357720.
