= Sylva, or A Discourse of Forest-Trees and the Propagation of Timber =

1664 book by John Evelyn

Sylva, or A Discourse of Forest-Trees and the Propagation of Timber in His Majesty's Dominions
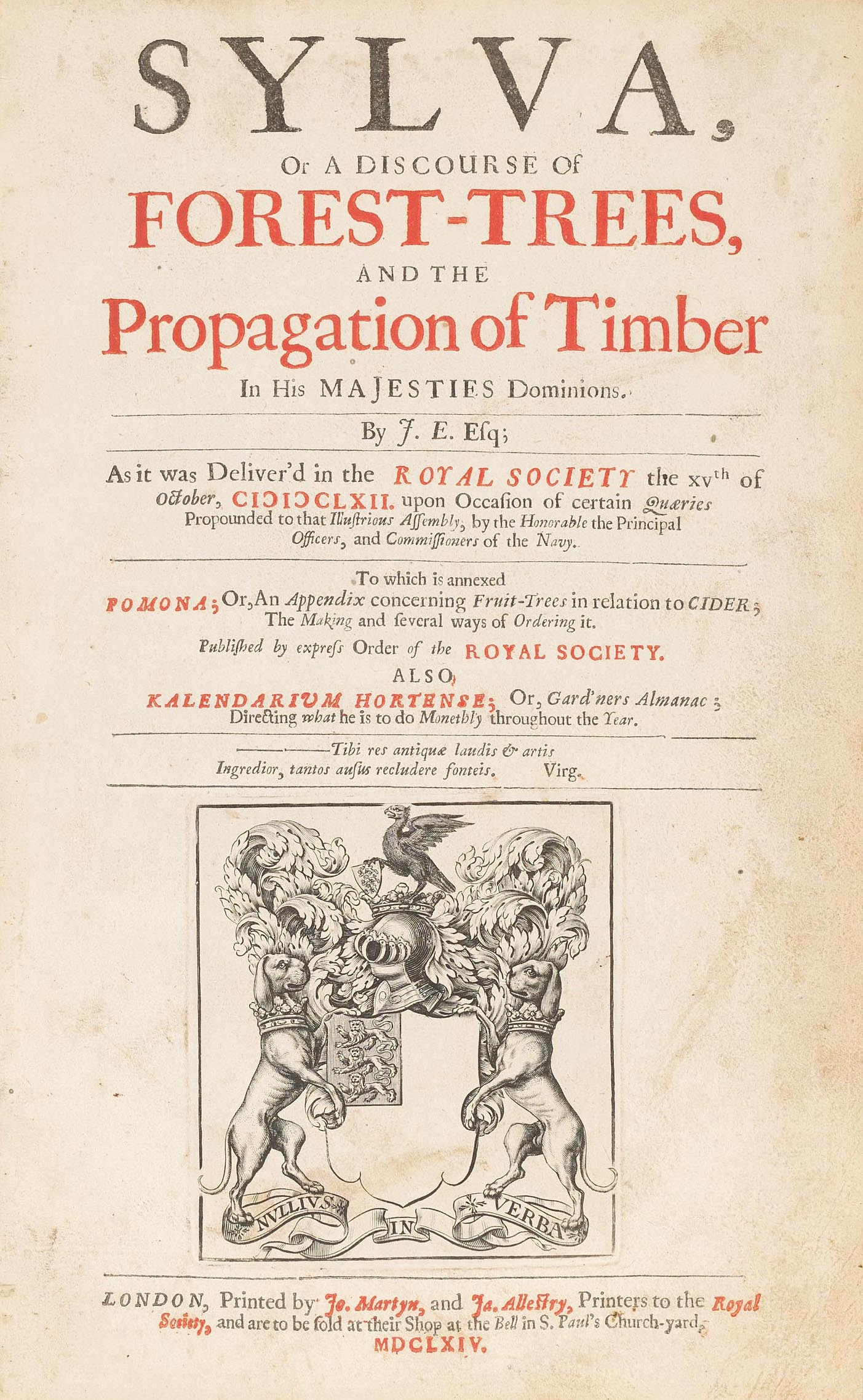
- title page of first edition (1664)
- Author: John Evelyn
- Subject: Forestry
- Published: 1662 (as a paper); 1664 (as a book; by John Martyn)

Sylva, or A Discourse of Forest-Trees and the Propagation of Timber in His Majesty's Dominions by the English writer John Evelyn was first presented in 1662 as a paper to the Royal Society. It was published as a book two years later in 1664, and is recognised as one of the most influential texts on forestry ever published.

A second edition with new engravings was published in 1670, and a third edition in 1679 included a geological essay by Evelyn. An expanded fourth edition was published in 1706, with the new segments specifically covering fruit trees and the production of cider.

== Editions ==
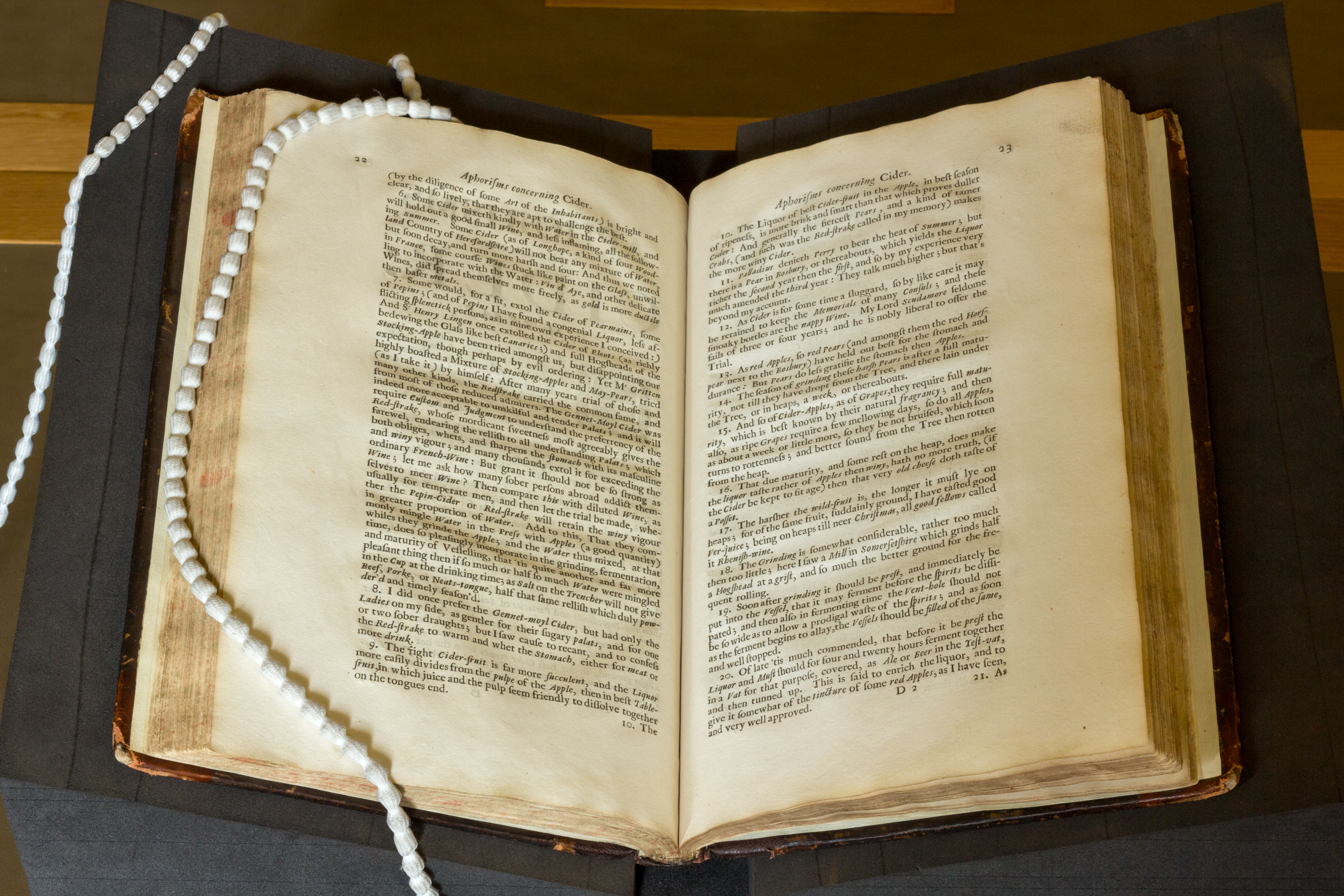
Opening from the Royal Society's copy of the 1664 1st book edition

- 1662 Sylva was first delivered to the Royal Society on 15 October 1662.
- 1664 Sylva—First Edition; printed by John Martyn for the Royal Society, and the first book published after the granting of their Royal Charter as publishers in 1662.

This edition contained the text delivered at the Royal Society 15 October 1662, with two annexes: Pomona ("An Appendix concerning Fruit-trees in relation to CIDER; The Making and several ways of Ordering it") and Kalendarium Hortense ("Or Gard‘ners Almanac; Directing what he is to do Monthly throughout the Year").
The assignment to King Charles II is dated 29 May 1663.
The text of Sylva is 120 pages; Pomona has 20 pages, followed by several texts concerning Cider (pp. 21–50), and the Kalendarium Hortense (pp. 51–83).

- 1670 Sylva Second Edition. Various engravings added.
- 1679 Sylva Third Edition. Included an essay from Evelyn about soils: Terra, a Philosophical Essay of Earth, being a Lecture in Course.
- 1706 Silva Fourth Edition, now spelt Silva, contained new sections Dendrologia, Pomona; Or, An Appendix concerning Fruit-Trees in relation to CIDER and Kalendarium Hortense. This was the last edition during Evelyn's lifetime.

=== Posthumous editions ===
- 1729 Silva edition.

Five editions were edited by Alexander Hunter (1729-1809):

- Silva 1776
- 1786
- 1801
- 1812
- 1825

=== Recent reproductions ===
- A facsimile of the first edition (1664) was produced in 1972 by the publisher Scolar Press.
- The fourth edition (1706) was republished in 1908 by Doubleday & Co. with a foreword by John Nisbet. This 1908 edition was republished in facsimile by Kessinger Publishing (30 Nov 2007).
- A new edition by Gabriel Hemery with illustrations by Sarah Simblet is published by Bloomsbury to coincide with the 350th anniversary in 2014 of the book's first publication. It is titled The New Sylva: a discourse of forest and orchard trees for the twenty-first century. The authors have their own blog following the book's creation: sylva.org.uk

== See also ==
- Hans Carl von Carlowitz
