= Anton van den Wyngaerde =

Flemish topographical artist (1525–1571)

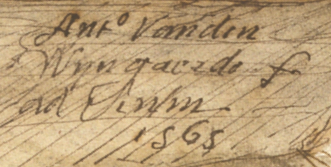
- Signature of Anton van der Wyngaerde (1565).
- Born: c. 1525; Antwerp, Habsburg Netherlands
- Died: 7 May 1571 (aged 45–46); Madrid, Habsburg Spain
- Known for: Sketching
- Notable work: Philip II of Spain

Anton van den Wyngaerde (Span.: Antonio de las Viñas; c. 1525 – 7 May 1571) was a prolific Flemish topographical artist who made panoramic sketches and paintings of towns in the southern Netherlands, northern France, England, Italy, and Spain. He is best known for the many panoramas of cities in Spain that he drew while employed by Philip II. After his death, his works were dispersed into different collections, and their importance neglected. Their historical and artistic value have been recently rediscovered.

== Life ==
Van den Wyngaerde was born probably around 1525 in Antwerp. His father may also have been an artist, as an "Anton van den Wyngaerde" was registered in 1510 in the painters’ guild. (Note: Some writers identify the van den Wyngaerde of 1510 as the topographical artist. This is unlikely, as he would have been in his eighties during a highly productive period when he visited many cities in Spain, but it is not impossible.)

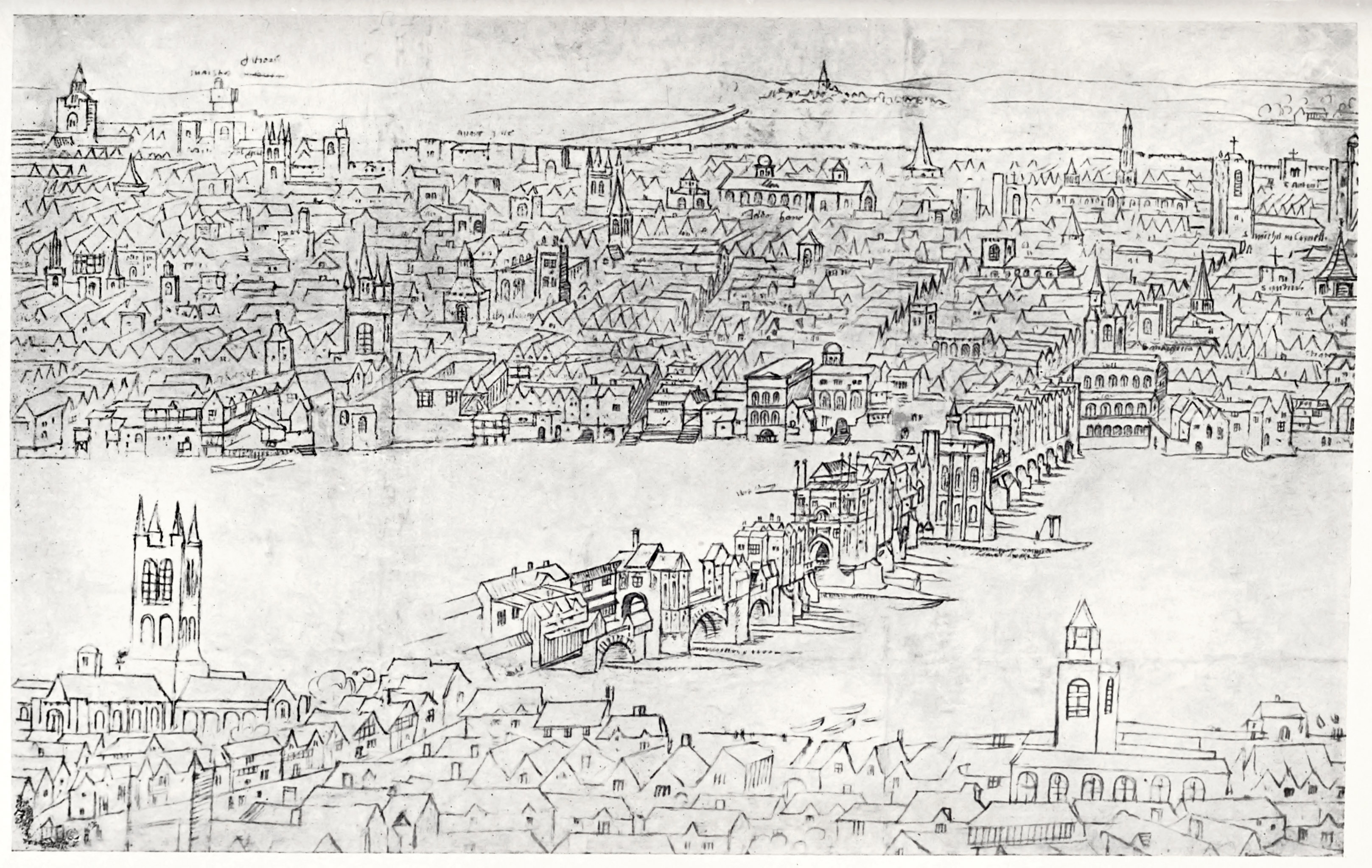
Old London Bridge, c. 1554–1557, looking north. Southwark Cathedral is in the left foreground

Van den Wyngaerde's first known work, from around 1544, was a topographical view of Dordrecht. As he was trained in the Antwerp school, he created his views using observations from nature. A large view of London in 14 sheets is dated to 1544, including a plan of Whitehall Palace, which he redrew for Henry VIII of England.

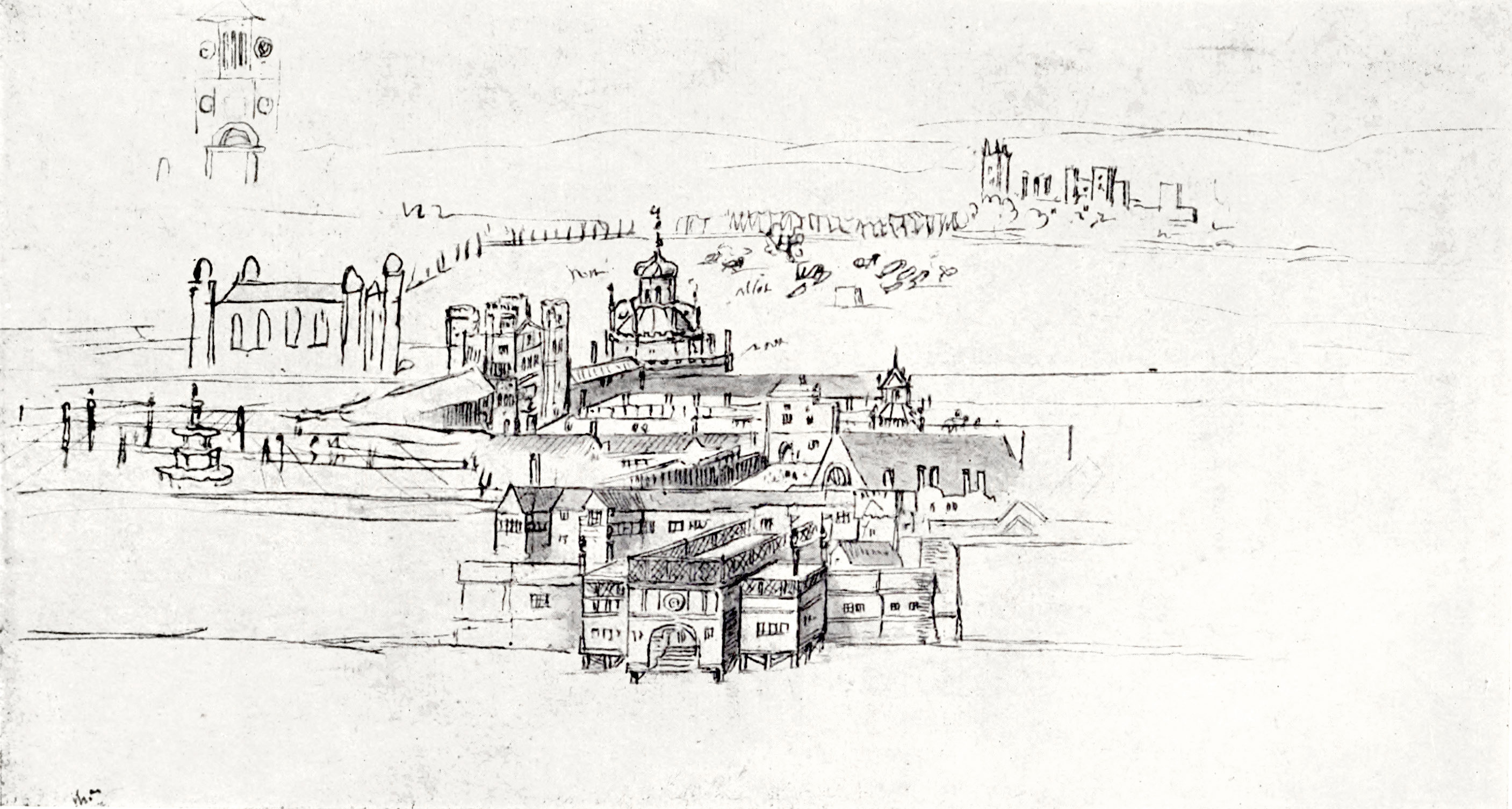
A sketch of Whitehall Palace, London in 1544.

Between 1552 and 1553 van den Wyngaerde created views of Rome, Genoa, Naples, and Ancona. Four of van den Wyngaerde's panoramas of Rome were discovered in the Sutherland Collection in the Bodleian Library of Oxford University. They appear to be copies, and may have been done by apprentices rather than by the artist himself. One original by van den Wyngaerde was found later, in four separate leaves, more clearly and carefully drawn. They must have been executed no later than September 1557, as one of them shows the Pons Aemilius still complete, while it was damaged by a flood of the Tiber on 18/27 September 1557, and was not repaired in stone until 1575.

Van den Wyngaerde entered the service of Philip II of Spain, and during the 1557 Spanish campaign in northern France he documented the sieges of Saint Quentin and Ham. He also drew views of Sluis, Dunkirk, Mechelen, and Bruges; a view of Brussels is dated 1558.

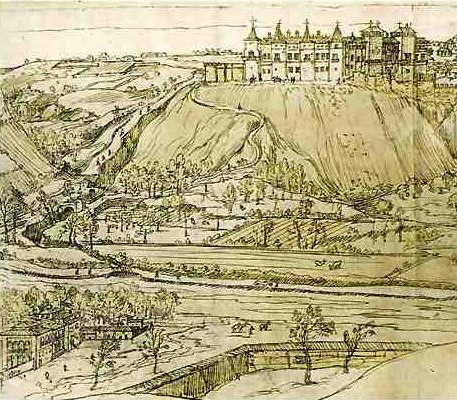
View of Madrid, 1562

Between 1558 and 1559 he visited England, perhaps more than once, and made views of places that Philip II had visited in 1555 when he had travelled thence to wed Mary I of England. These views included Dover and London, as well as the palaces of Greenwich, Hampton Court, Oatlands, and Richmond. The original of the Panorama of London is in that part of the Sutherland Collection in the Ashmolean Museum, Oxford, and measures 10 feet by 17 inches, in seven sheets.

Around 1561 or 1562, Anton van den Wyngaerde travelled to Spain where Philip II commissioned him to document all the main towns, and also to decorate the royal palaces with pictures of the Netherlands, Spain, and Italy. He decorated the walls of the El Pardo Palace with several city views, and he painted scenery for theatre productions at the royal court. Van den Wyngaerde made at least sixty-two views of cities and towns, including Barcelona, Valencia, Zaragoza, Granada, Córdoba, Seville, Toledo, Burgos and Madrid. Van den Wyngaerde's picture of Cádiz before it was sacked by the English in 1596 is the only reliable view from that time. He drew the first known detailed picture of Gibraltar. His main task was to make paintings of the many cities in Philip's kingdom on the walls of the Royal Palace of Madrid. These were lost in a fire of 1727 that destroyed the palace, but many of his preparatory drawings survived.

Van de Wyngaerde once said, "Among all the joys that the delightful and ingenious art of painting has to offer, there is not one that I hold in higher esteem than the representation of cities." His last dated work was a panorama of Zamora in Spain from 1570.

He died in Madrid in 1571. He received little recognition during or after his life, and his work was rediscovered only in the late 1800s.

== Work ==
As a servant of the king, van den Wyngaerde's drawings presented the Spanish cities in their best possible light, but he succeeded in giving a vivid depiction of town life in his day. He showed the general prosperity of the Spanish cities, fast-growing although all were still walled cities in the medieval tradition, dominated by churches and palaces. The drawings show the cities as they were during the Golden Age of Philip II with what appears to be photographic accuracy. However, there is no trace in his pictures of the squalor of street life that prevailed in all cities of that time.

Van den Wyngaerde's city views, often from imaginary viewpoints, were made without falling back on surveys or plans but depended on the artist's visual memory and imagination. His line drawings would be enhanced with watercolours in green, blue, red and brown to add detail and realism. He would add pictures of the surrounding countryside with figures of people to give a sense of scale, but the sense of realism was illusory, as close examination shows problems of scale and selective representation of features of interest.

In a 1563 View of Valencia, the city seems to be viewed from the north, but the cathedral is depicted as it appears from the west, displaying the building to better advantage. The streets are made wider and straighter as though the city had been formally planned, the squares are made larger, and some of the towers are moved to different positions. Despite the appearance of detail and realism, the picture gives an idealized sense of the city's appearance rather than an accurate representation. Van den Wyngaerde's work was always more artistic than scientific.

== Gallery ==
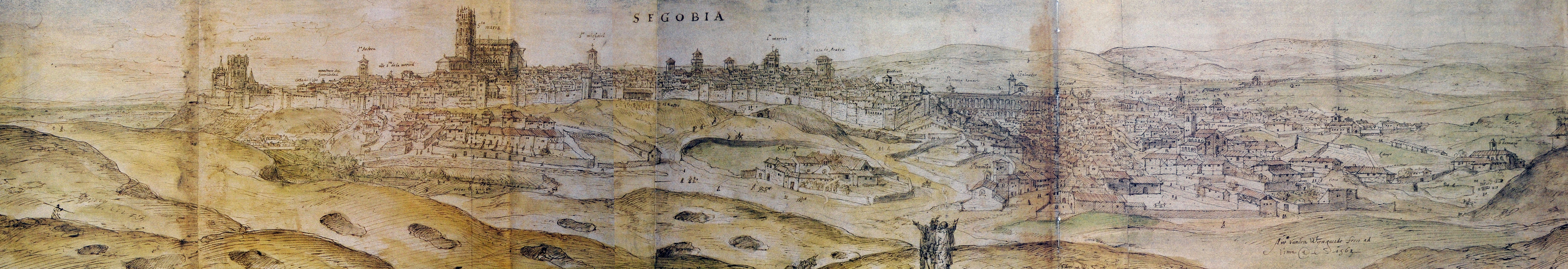
Segovia, 1562

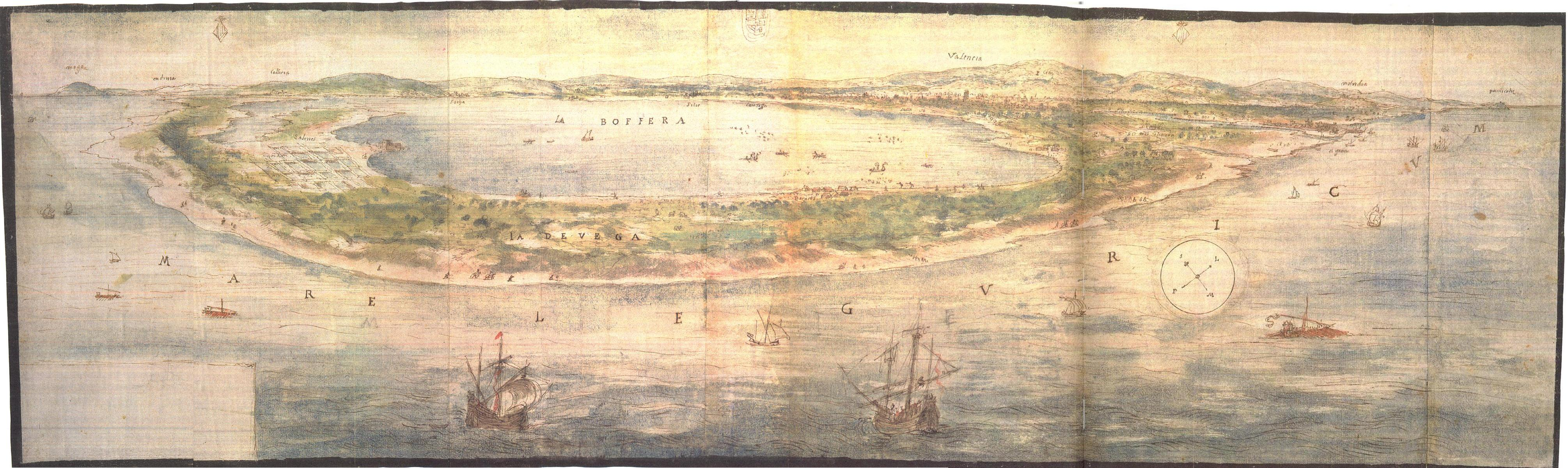
Albufera in Valencia, 1563

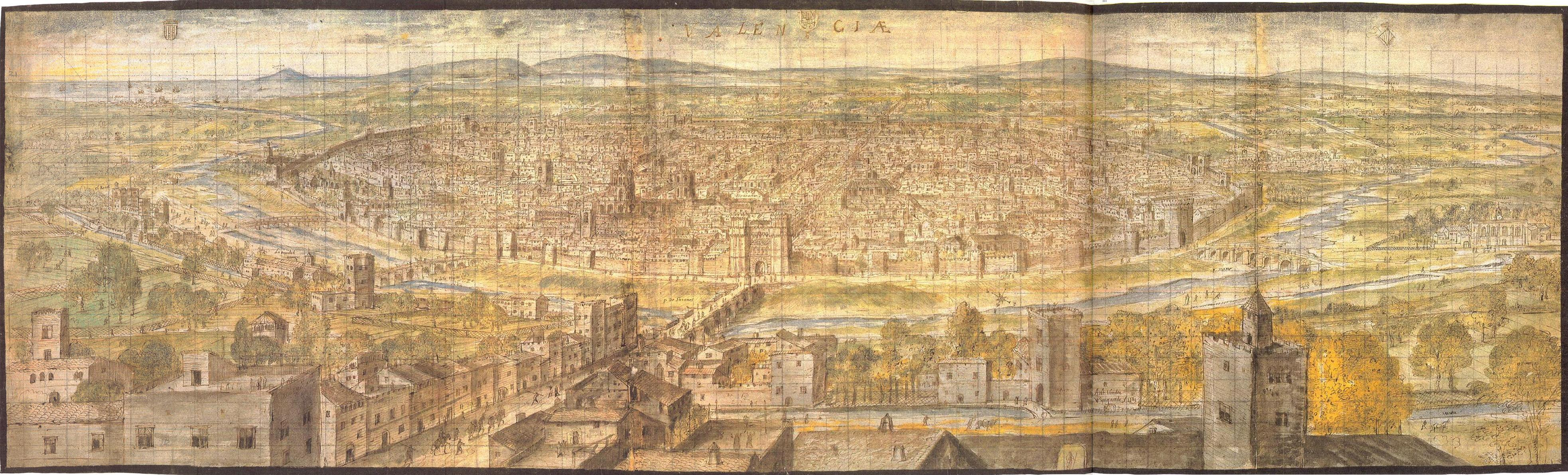
Valencia, 1563

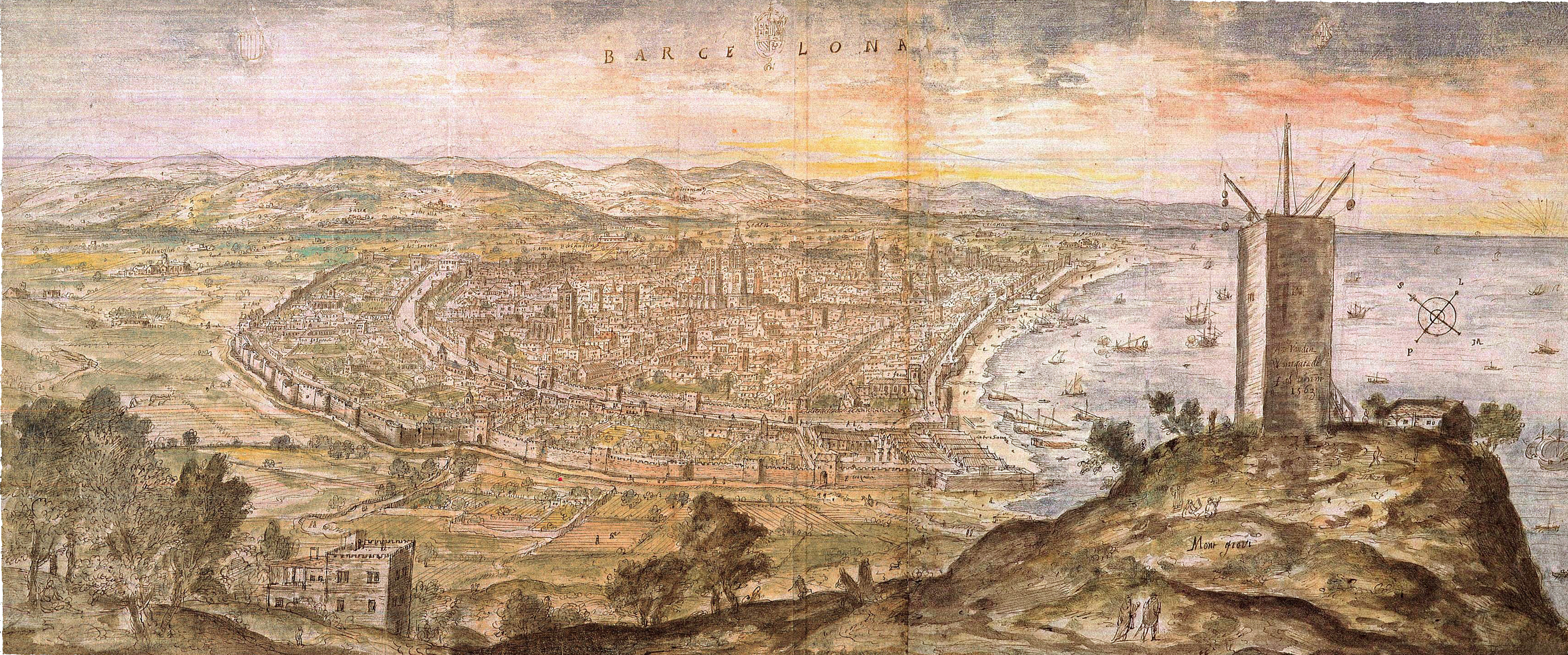
Barcelona, 1563

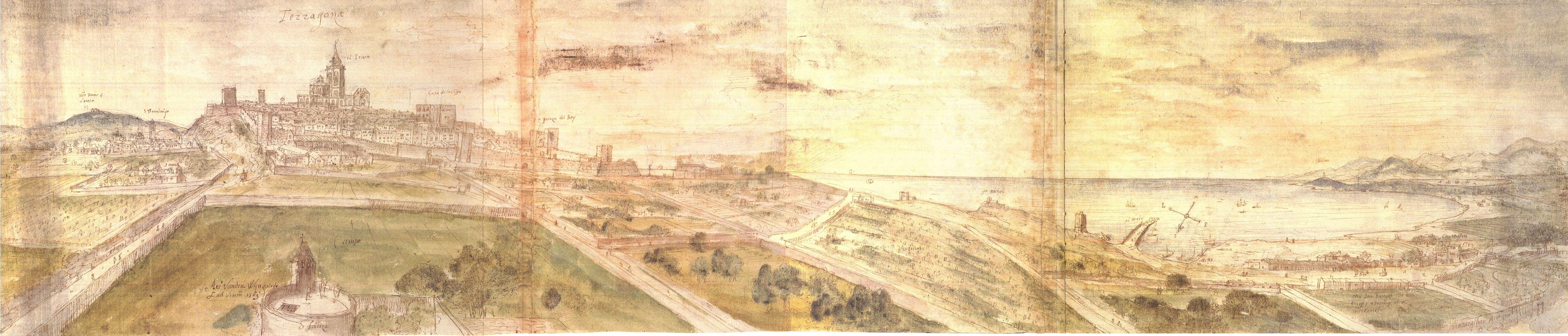
Tarragona, 1563

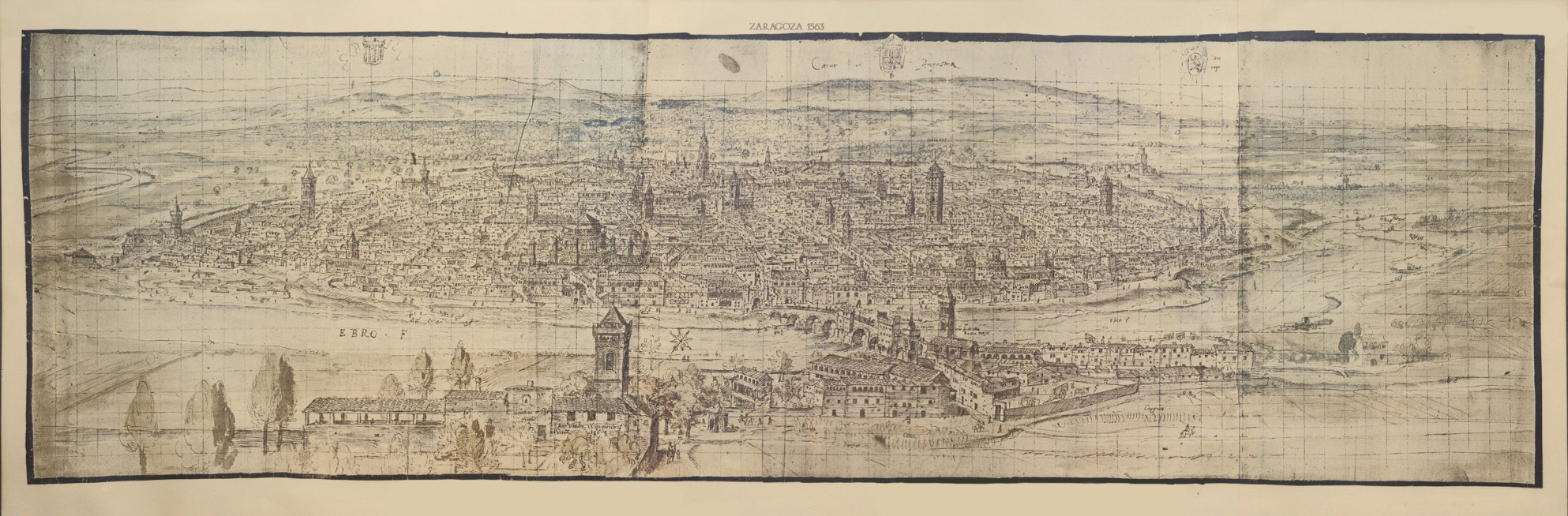
Zaragoza, 1563

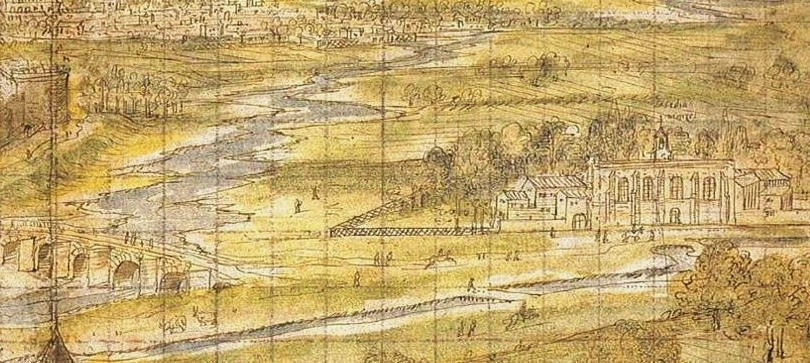
Monestir de la Saïdia in the view of Valencia, 1563

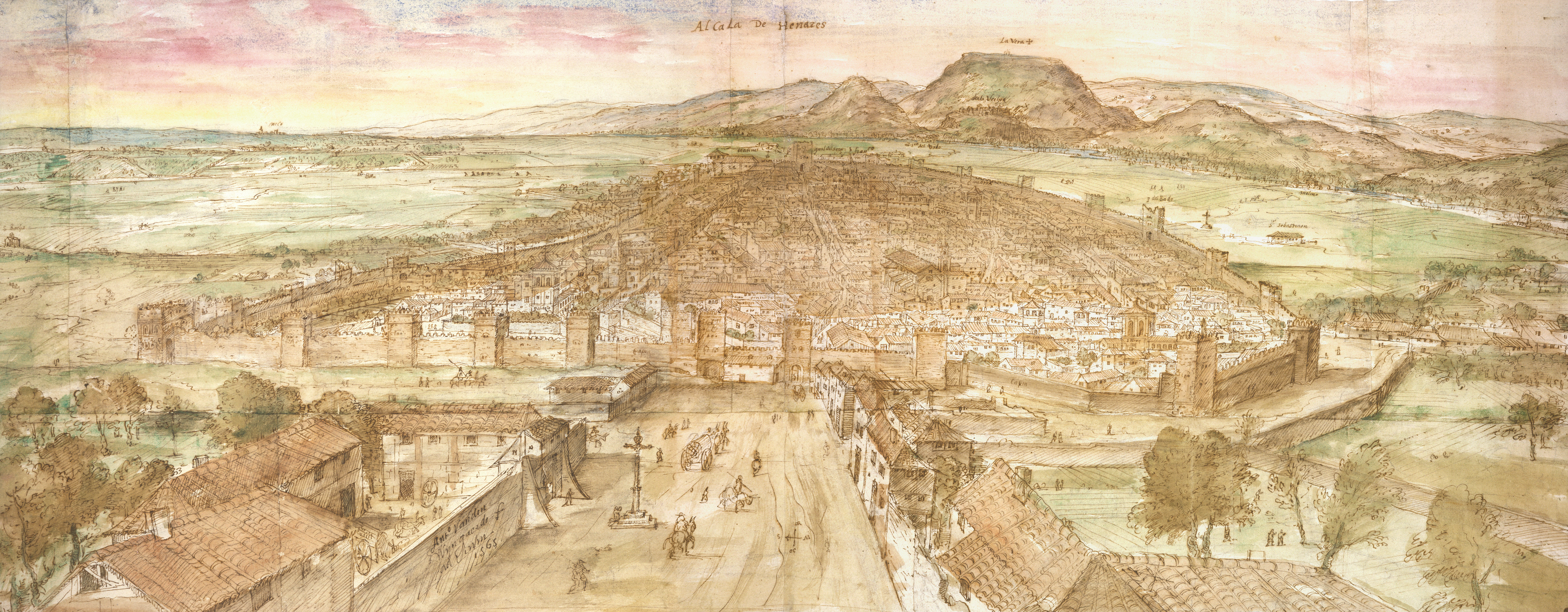
Alcalá de Henares, 1565

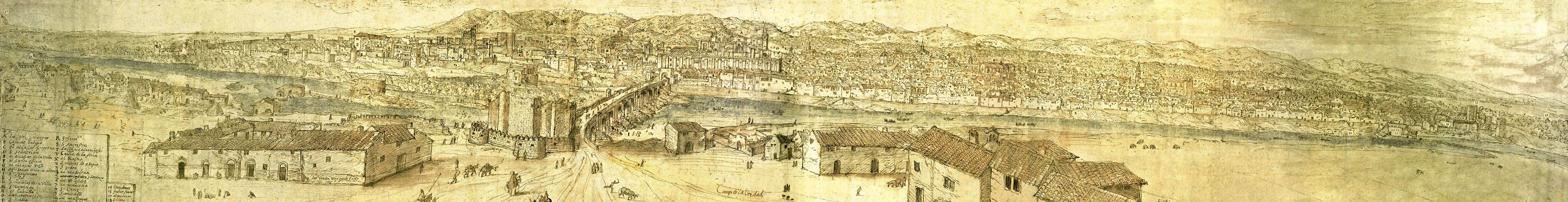
Córdoba, 1567

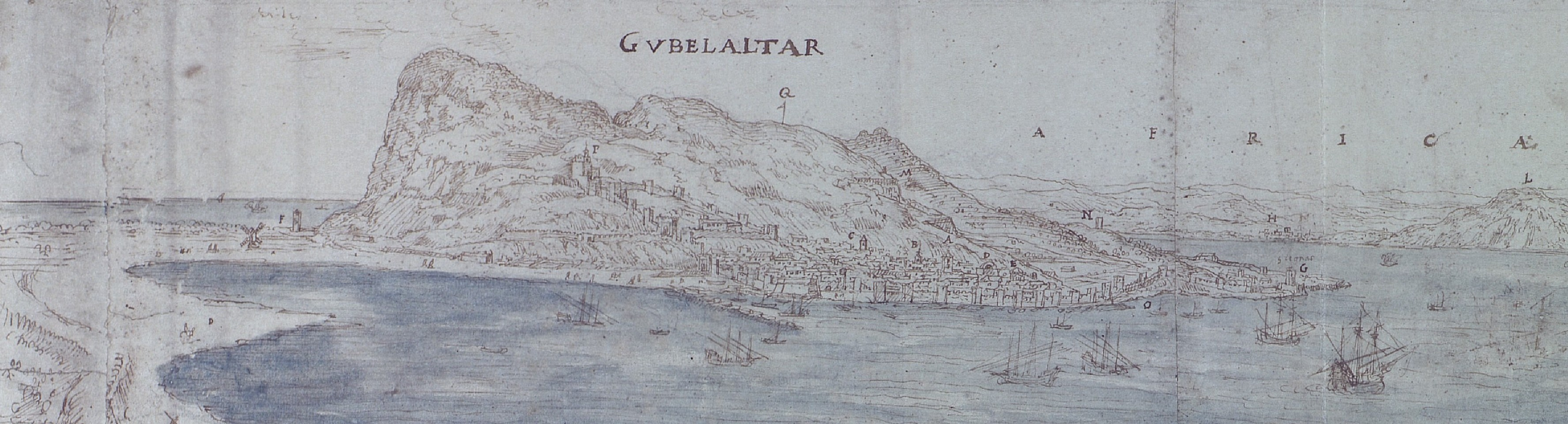
Gibraltar, 1567

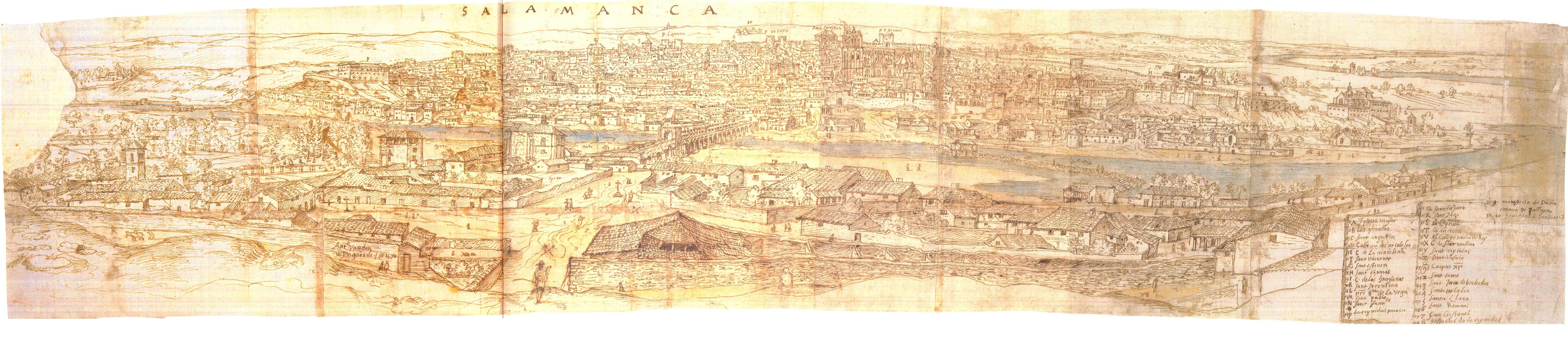
Salamanca, 1570
