= London Topographical Society =

Publisher of material about London, England

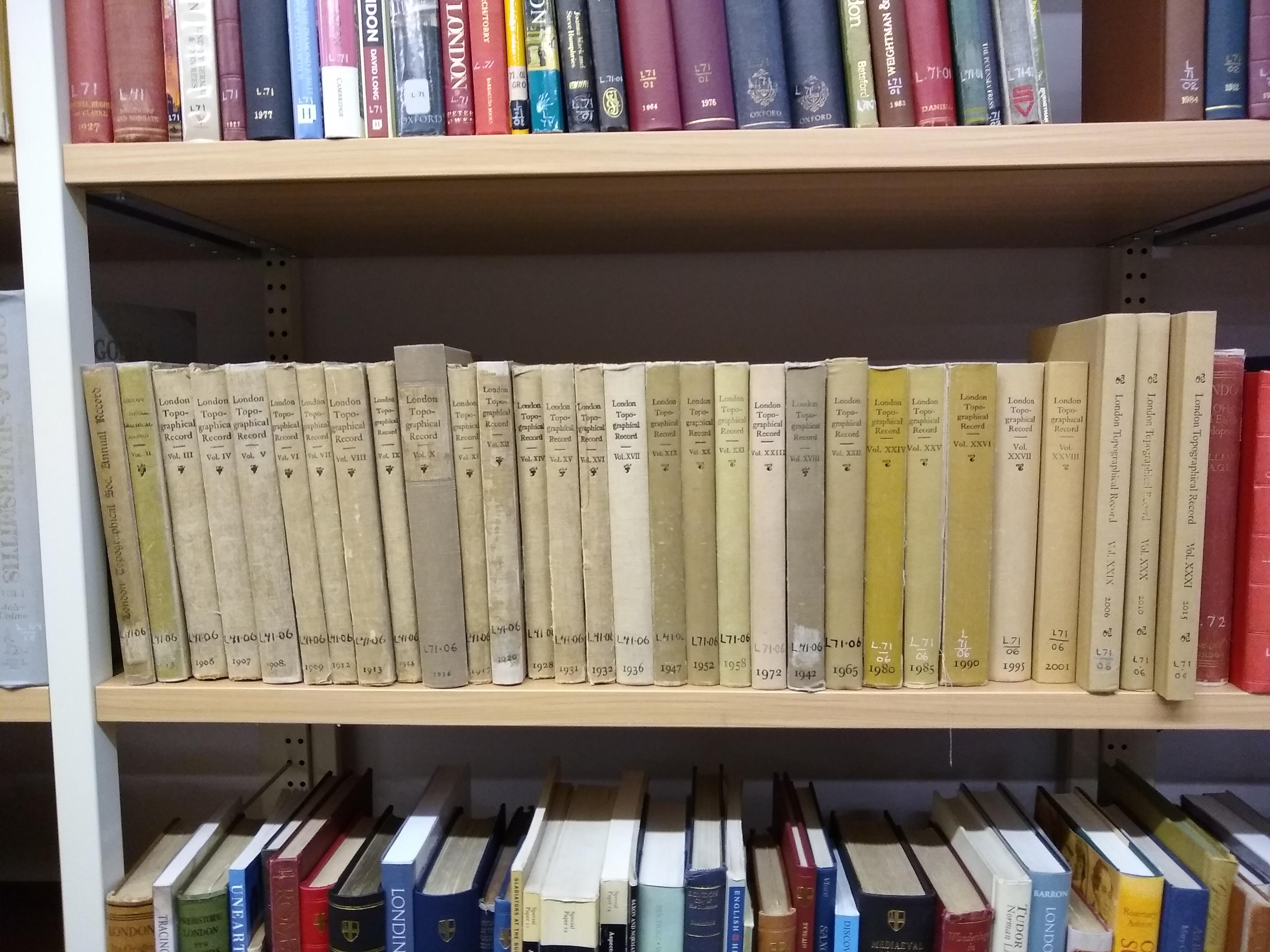
Volumes of the London Topographical Record at the Guildhall Library, London.

The London Topographical Society was founded as the Topographical Society of London in 1880 to publish "material illustrating the history and topography of the City and County of London from the earliest times to the present day". Its journal, the London Topographical Record, has been published irregularly since 1880. It is a registered charity, number 271590.
