= Thomas Geminus =

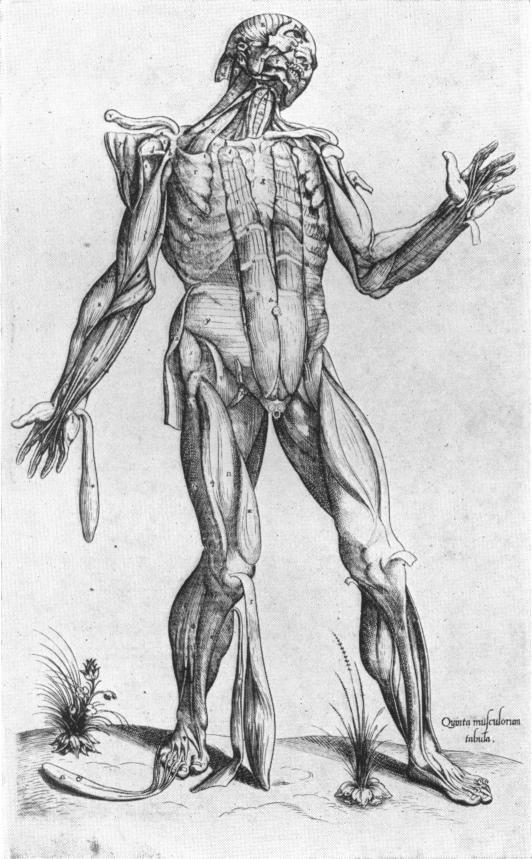
Engraving from 1545 "Compendiosa totius anatomie delineatio" after Vesalius

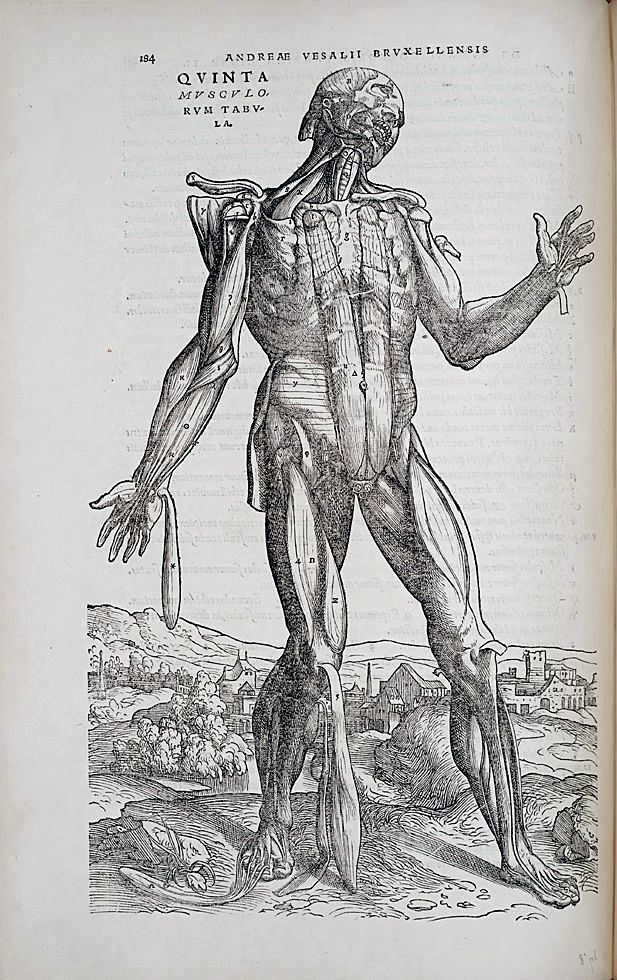
Woodcut from 1543 "De humani corporis fabrica" by Vesalius

Thomas Geminus (c. 1510 – May 1562) was a pseudonym for the Flemish refugee Thomas Lambrit/Thomas Lambert, an engraver and printer, active from the 1540s in London, and noted for his 1545 Latin work, Compendiosa totius anatomie delineatio, aere exarata ("A complete delineation of the entire anatomy engraved on copper") printed by John Herford. Geminus started work in England by working with Thomas Raynalde and producing "The byrth of Mankinde" aka "The Woman's booke" in 1545.

He was born in Lille. "The byrth of Mankinde", was the best English language reference work on midwifery in the 1500s. Its text was translated from Eucharius Rösslin's "Der schwangern Frauwen und Hebammen Rosengarten". Its first English edition was a 1540 translation by Richard Jonas. The second, by Thomas Raynalde, appeared in 1545 and saw many editions in the next 100 years. It discussed fertility, pregnancy, birth, and infant care, with the best anatomical descriptions then available. Its illustrations were again after Vesalius via Geminus's "Compendiosa".

The "Compendiosa totius anatomie" consisted of 41 unnumbered engraved sheets and was dedicated to Edward VI. One of the sheets was a fold-out engraving of the external anatomy of Adam and Eve; in addition there were 3 engravings of the skeleton, 16 of the muscles, 5 of the arteries and veins, 4 of the nerves, 6 of the organs, 4 of the brain, and one of the eye and its parts, all after woodcuts by Vesalius. The Latin edition of 1545 had been distributed in Italy, France, Spain, Germany, and other countries. Geminus wrote in the later English version that it had been produced for the benefit of "unlatined Surgeons". He had employed Nicholas Udall, the playwright, to translate some of the work, while the text was taken from an early translation of Henri de Mondeville's "Surgery". The book was a great success, printing three editions in England - one in Latin (1545) and two in English translation (1553 and 1559).

In his engraved copies, Geminus removed all the detail he regarded as superfluous, notably the background landscapes which had informed Vesalius's images. The copperplate engravings were the first ever to be done in England, and enjoyed a large following in France. Jacques Grévin, the French poet who also happened to be a physician and writer on matters medical, had print editions done from Geminus's plates in 1564, 1565 and a French translation in 1569. Watermarks suggest that the plates for the 1564 Paris edition were printed in London and then transported to Paris.
