= William Blackstone =

English jurist, judge, and politician (1723–1780)

Sir William Blackstone
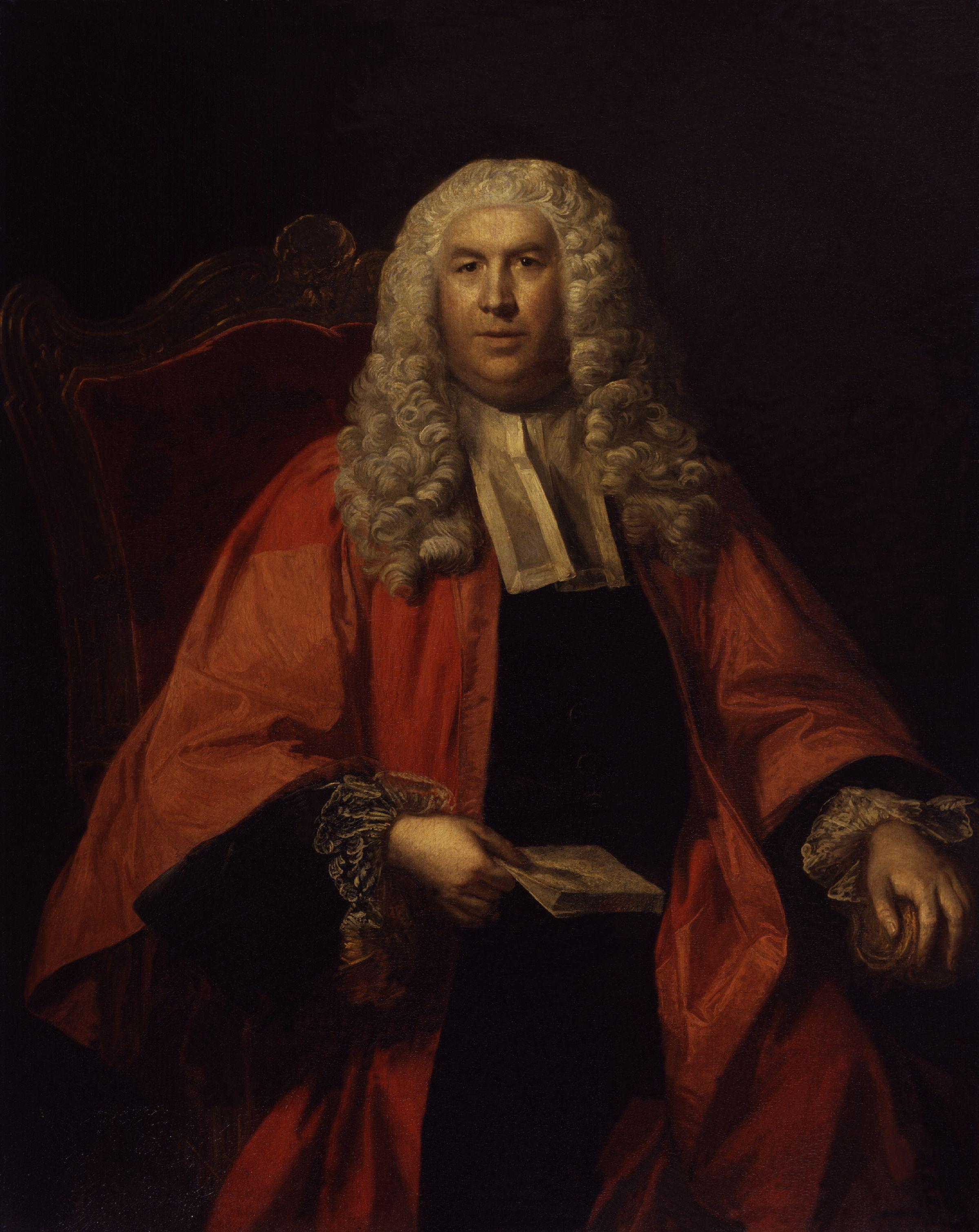

Justice of the Common Pleas
- In office 25 June 1770 – 14 February 1780
- Preceded by: Edward Clive
- Succeeded by: John Heath

Justice of the Court of King's Bench
- In office 16 February 1770 – 25 June 1770
- Preceded by: Joseph Yates
- Succeeded by: William Ashurst

Member of Parliament for Westbury
- In office 1768–1770
- Preceded by: Chauncy Townsend
- Succeeded by: Charles Dillon

Member of Parliament for Hindon
- In office 30 March 1761 – 1768
- Preceded by: James Calthorpe
- Succeeded by: John St Leger Douglas

Personal details
- Born: 10 July 1723 London, England
- Died: 14 February 1780 (aged 56) Wallingford, Berkshire, England
- Resting place: St Peter's Church, Wallingford
- Party: Tory
- Spouse: Sarah Clitherow (m. 1761)
- Children: 8
- Education: Pembroke College, Oxford; Middle Temple

Sir William Blackstone (10 July 1723 – 14 February 1780) was an English jurist, justice, and Tory politician most noted for his Commentaries on the Laws of England, which became the best-known description of the doctrines of the English common law. Born into a middle-class family in London, Blackstone was educated at Charterhouse School before matriculating at Pembroke College, Oxford, in 1738. After switching to and completing a Bachelor of Civil Law degree, he was made a fellow of All Souls College, Oxford, on 2 November 1743, admitted to Middle Temple, and called to the Bar there in 1746. Following a slow start to his career as a barrister, Blackstone was involved heavily in university administration, becoming accountant, treasurer, and bursar on 28 November 1746, and Senior Bursar in 1750. Blackstone is considered responsible for completing the Codrington Library and the Warton Building, and for simplifying the complex accounting system used by the college. On 3 July, 1753, he formally gave up his practice as a barrister, and embarked on a series of lectures on English law, the first of their kind. These talks were massively successful, earning him £453 (£94,000 in 2025 terms); they led to the publication of An Analysis of the Laws of England in 1756, which sold out repeatedly. It was used to preface his later works.

On 20 October, 1759, Blackstone was confirmed as the first Vinerian Professor of English Law, immediately embarking on another series of lectures and publishing a similarly successful second treatise, A Discourse on the Study of the Law. With his growing fame, he successfully returned to the bar and maintained a good practice, also securing election as Tory Member of Parliament for the rotten borough of Hindon on 30 March 1761. In November 1765 he published the first of four volumes of Commentaries on the Laws of England, considered his magnum opus; the completed work earned Blackstone £14,000 (£2.1 million in 2025 terms). After repeated failures, he gained appointment to the judiciary as a justice of the Court of King's Bench on 16 February 1770, leaving to replace Edward Clive as a justice of the Common Pleas on 25 June. He remained in this position until his death, on 14 February 1780.

Blackstone's four-volume Commentaries were designed to provide a complete overview of English law and were republished in 1770, 1773, 1774, 1775, 1778, and in a posthumous edition in 1783. Reprints of the first edition, intended for practical use rather than antiquary interest, were published until the 1870s in England and Wales, and a working version by Henry John Stephen, first published in 1841, was reprinted until after the Second World War. Legal education in England had stalled; Blackstone's work gave the law "at least a veneer of scholarly respectability". William Searle Holdsworth, one of Blackstone's successors as Vinerian Professor, argued that "If the Commentaries had not been written when they were written, I think it very doubtful that the United States, and other English speaking countries would have so universally adopted the common law." In the United States, the Commentaries influenced Alexander Hamilton, John Marshall, James Wilson, John Jay, John Adams, James Kent and Abraham Lincoln, and remain frequently cited in Supreme Court decisions.

== Early life and education ==
Blackstone was the fourth and posthumous son of Charles Blackstone, a silk mercer from Cheapside, the son of a wealthy apothecary. He became firm friends with Thomas Bigg, a surgeon and the son of Lovelace Bigg, a gentleman from Wiltshire. After Bigg's sister Mary came to London, Charles eventually persuaded her to marry him in 1718. This was not seen as a good match for her, but the couple lived happily and had four sons, three of whom lived into adulthood. Charles (born August 1719) and Henry (May 1722), both became fellows of New College, Oxford, and took holy orders. Their last son, William, was born on 10 July 1723, five months after Charles' death in February.

Although Charles and Mary Blackstone were members of the middle class rather than landed gentry, they were particularly prosperous. Tax records show Charles Blackstone to have been the second most prosperous man in the parish in 1722, and death registers show that the family had several servants. This, along with Thomas Bigg's assistance to the family following Charles' death, helps explain the educational upbringing of the children. William Blackstone was sent to Charterhouse School in 1730 having been nominated by Charles Wither, a relative of Mary Blackstone. William did well there, and became head of the school by age 15. However, after Charles' death the family fortunes declined, and after Mary died (5 January 1736) the family's resources largely went to meet unpaid bills. William was able to remain at Charterhouse as a "poor scholar", having been named to that position in June 1735 after being nominated by Sir Robert Walpole.

Blackstone revelled in Charterhouse's academic curriculum, particularly the Latin poetry of Ovid and Virgil. He began to attract note as a poet at school, writing a 30-line set of rhyming couplets to celebrate the wedding of James Hotchkis, the headmaster. He also won a silver medal for his Latin verses on John Milton, gave the annual Latin oration in 1738, and was noted as having been the favourite student of his masters. On 1 October 1738, taking advantage of a new scholarship available to Charterhouse students, Blackstone matriculated at Pembroke College, Oxford.

== Oxford ==
=== Study ===
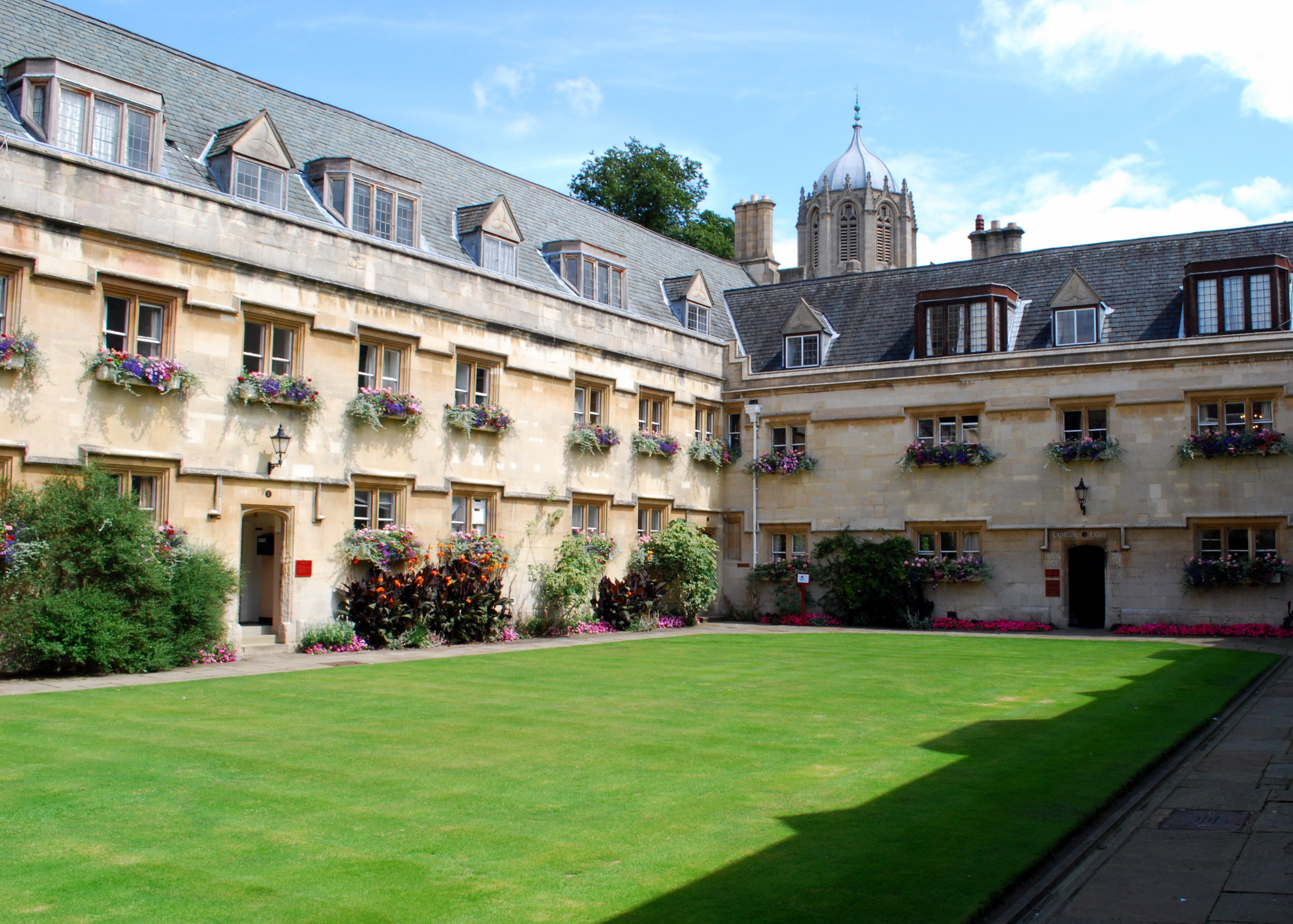
The Old Quad of Pembroke College, Oxford, where Blackstone studied

There are few surviving records of Blackstone's undergraduate term at Oxford, but the curriculum of Pembroke College had been set out in 1624, and Wilfrid Prest notes that it was probably still followed in 1738, so Blackstone would have studied Greek, science, logic, rhetoric, philosophy, mathematics, geography and poetry. Blackstone was particularly good at Greek, mathematics, and poetry, with his notes on William Shakespeare being included in George Steevens' 1781 edition of Shakespeare's plays. Many of Blackstone's undergraduate texts survive, and they include few legal texts, instead being wide-ranging: politics, current affairs, poetry, geometry, and controversial theological texts. The last element is understandable, given his family's theological interests, but the more surprising element is the sheer number of texts he owned, given his relative poverty as a student.

On 9 July 1740, after only a year and a half as a Bachelor of Arts student, Blackstone was admitted to study for a Bachelor of Civil Law degree, civil law being the only legal area recognised by his university. This degree course was seven years long, the first two "supposedly devoted to a broad course of reading in humane studies", which allowed him to study his own interests. On 20 November 1741 he was admitted to the Middle Temple, the first step on the road to becoming a barrister, but this imposed no obligations and simply allowed a legal career to be an option. At the time there was no proper legal education system, and Blackstone read (in his own time) Coke on Littleton, the works of Henry Finch, and related legal tracts.

In addition to his formal studies, Blackstone published a collection of poetry which included the draft version of The Lawyer to his Muse, his most famous literary work. In 1743, he published Elements of Architecture and An Abridgement of Architecture, two treatises on the rules governing the art of construction. His next work (1747) was The Pantheon: A Vision, an anonymously published book of poetry covering the various religions in the world. It depicts a narrator's walking dream through the buildings of various religions, which are all (other than Christianity) depicted in a negative light. This followed his election as a Fellow of All Souls College, Oxford on 2 November 1743, and his call to the Bar by the Middle Temple on 28 November 1746.

His call to the Bar saw Blackstone begin to alternate between Oxford and London, occupying chambers in Pump Court but living at All Souls College. As the central courts only sat for three months of the year, the rest of his time was spent on Assize when his work at All Souls permitted. He regularly acted as a law reporter; his personal notes on cases start with Hankey v Trotman (1746). Blackstone's barrister practice began slowly; his first case in the Court of King's Bench was in 1748(as approx ), and he had only 6 additional motions there through 1751. Two appearances in the Court of Chancery are also noted, and he is known to have been consulted in Roger Newdigate's long-running lawsuit there, but his early court appearances are infrequent. This is considered to have been due to his call to the Bar occurring at the same time as the massive contraction in business by the central courts, along with his singular lack of connections due to his status as an orphan from the middle class; he was described as "unrecognised and unemployed". He filled his time by acting as counsel for Oxford, and from May 1749 with his election as Recorder of Wallingford.

=== University administration ===
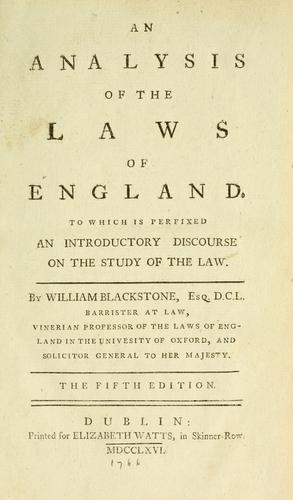
An Analysis of the Laws of England, Blackstone's first legal treatise, published during this period

While dividing his time, Blackstone became an administrator at All Souls, securing appointment as accountant, treasurer and bursar on 28 November 1746. Completion of the Codrington Library and Warton Building, first started in 1710 and 1720 respectively but not built until 1748, is attributed to his work. In 1749 he became Steward of the Manors, and in 1750 was made Senior Bursar. Records show a "perfectionist zeal" in organising the estates and finances of All Souls, and Blackstone was noted for massively simplifying the complex accounting system used by the college. In 1750 Blackstone completed his first legal tract, An Essay on Collateral Consanguinity, which dealt with those claiming a familial tie to the founder of All Souls in an attempt to gain preeminence in elections. Completion of his Doctor of Civil Law degree, which he was awarded in April 1750, admitted him to Convocation, the governing body of Oxford, which elected the two burgesses who represented it in the House of Commons, along with most of the university officers. With this and with his continuing work at the university, Blackstone announced on 3 July 1753 his intentions to "no longer attend the Courts at Westminster, but to pursue my Profession in a Way more agreeable to me in all respects, by residing at Oxford [and] to engraft upon this Resolution a Scheme which I am told may be beneficial to the University as well as myself", which was to give a set of lectures on the common law – the first lectures of that sort in the world.

This was not entirely out of benevolence; according to Prest, Blackstone was likely aware that an Oxford alumnus, Charles Viner, was planning to endow a professorship of English law. The Regius Professorship of Civil Law had also become vacant in 1753; despite support from Lord Mansfield, Blackstone had been rejected in favour of Robert Jenner, widely considered Blackstone's lesser intellectually but a far greater political mind. In addition, a private lecture series would be extremely lucrative. While his All Souls fellowship gave him £70 a year, records show that the lecture series brought him £116, £226 and £111 a year respectively from 1753 to 1755 – a total of £453 (£89,000 in 2025 terms). A prospectus was issued on 23 June 1753, and with a class of approximately 20 students, the first set of lectures were completed by July 1754. Despite Blackstone's limited oratory skills and a speaking style described by Jeremy Bentham as "formal, precise and affected", Blackstone's lectures were warmly appreciated. The second and third series were far more popular, partly due to the then unusual use of printed handouts and lists of suggested reading. No copies of these handouts exist, but Alexander Popham, later a close friend of Blackstone, attended the lectures and made notes, which survive. These show Blackstone's attempts to reduce English law to a logical system, with the division of subjects later being the basis for his Commentaries.

Following his lecture series, Blackstone became more prominent in convocation and other university activities. Oxford and Cambridge at the time had a strange system of law; due to their unique natures, they had exclusive jurisdiction over both academics and students in a fashion which followed either the common law or their own customs, based on the civil law. With his appointment as assessor (or chief legal officer) of the Chancellor's Court, Blackstone became far more involved in the university's peculiar legal system, and records show him sitting between eight and ten times a year from 1753 to 1759, mainly dealing with small claims of debt. He also wrote a manual on the Court's practice, and through his position gained a large number of contacts and connections, as well as visibility, which aided his legal career significantly. This period also saw Blackstone write his last known piece of poetry, Friendship: An Ode, in 1756.

In 1756 Blackstone published the first of his full legal texts, the 200 page An Analysis of the Laws of England. Published by the Clarendon Press, the treatise was intended to demonstrate the "Order, and principal Divisions" of his lecture series, and a structured introduction to English law. Prest calls this "a marked advance on any previous introduction to English law ... including constitutional, civil and criminal law, public and private law, substantive law and procedure, as well as some introductory jurisprudential content". The initial print run of 1,000 copies almost immediately sold out, leading to the printing of three more 1,000-book lots over the next three years, which all sold out. A fifth edition was published in 1762, and a sixth, edited to take into account Blackstone's Commentaries on the Laws of England, in 1771. Because of the success of the Commentaries, Prest remarks that "relatively little scholarly attention has been paid to this work"; at the time, however, it was hailed as "an elegant performance ... calculated to facilitate this branch of knowledge".

=== Vinerian Professor of English Law ===
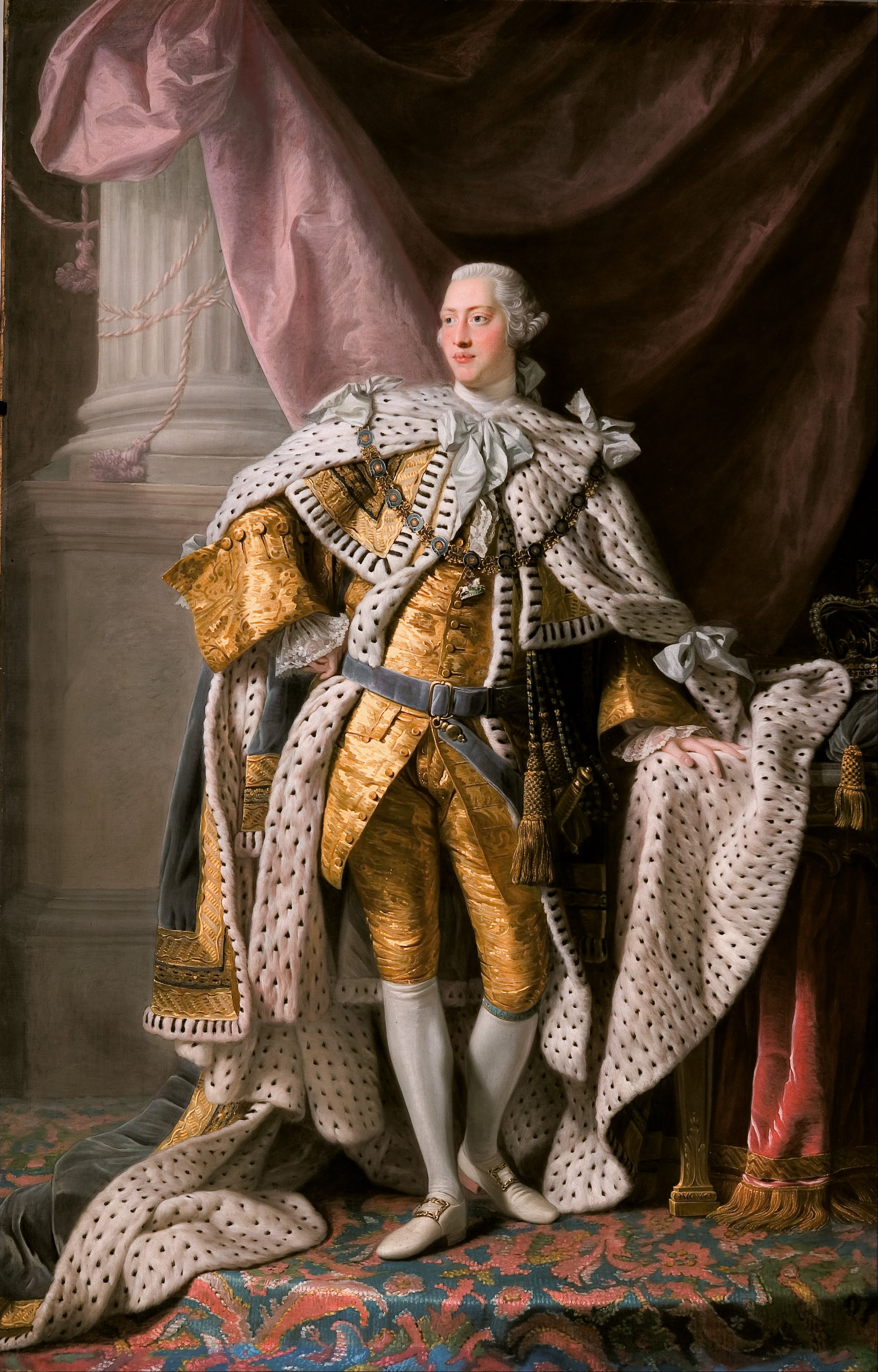
King George III, a patron of Blackstone

On 8 March 1758, the group executing Charles Viner's will reported to Convocation that Viner recommended creating a Chair of English Law, with a £200 salary. After much debate, this position was created, and on 20 October 1758 Blackstone was confirmed as the first Vinerian Professor of English Law. On 24 October he gave his first lecture, to "a crowded audience"; the text was soon printed and published as A Discourse on the Study of the Law. The lecture was tremendously popular, being described as a "sensible, spirited and manly exhortation to the study of the law"; the initial print run sold out, necessitating the publication of another 1,000 copies, and it was used to preface later versions of the Analysis and the first volume of the Commentaries. Within the university, however, Blackstone was not as popular. As soon as the lecture series opened, an anonymously written open letter was published charging that Blackstone had "violated the Statutes of the University, by arbitrarily changing the Day appointed for reading his solemn Lectures". Blackstone suffered a nervous breakdown soon after the first lecture, and on 24 November he launched a suit in the Chancellor's Court against "William Jackson of the City of Oxford Printer" for £500 damages, justified by Jackson "printing and publishing a scandalous Libel notoriously reflecting on the Character of him the said William Blackstone". Jackson had refused to reveal who ordered the anonymous pamphlet, leading to the suit, but it evidently did not proceed further.

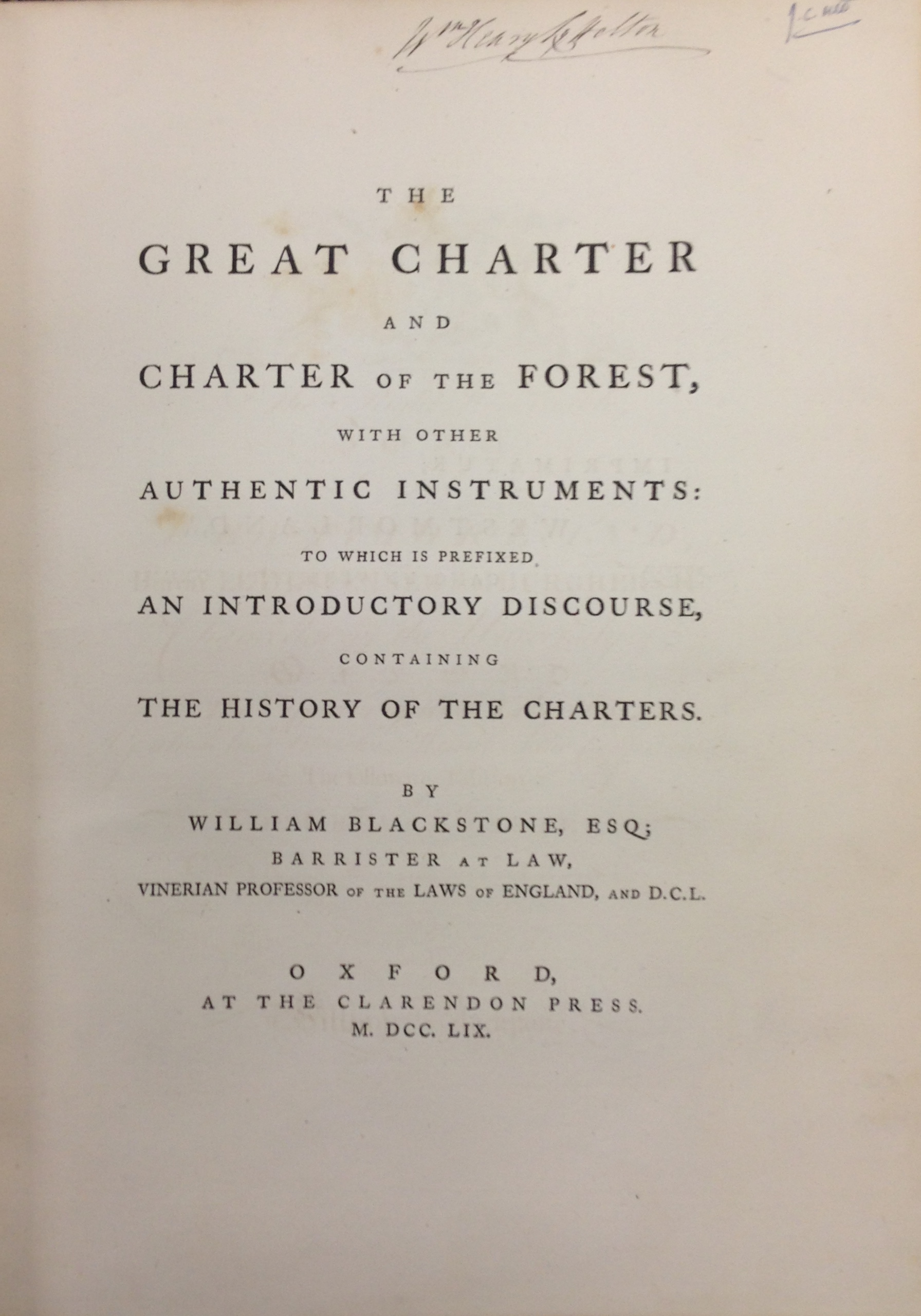
The title page of the first edition of Blackstone's The Great Charter and Charter of the Forest (1759) The signature of William Henry Lyttelton, 3rd Baron Lyttelton (1782–1837), an English Whig politician, appears at the top of the page in this copy of the book.

This suit, along with the struggle over the Vinerian Professorship and other controversies, damaged his reputation within the university, as evidenced by his failure to win election as Vice Warden in April 1759, losing to John White. Prest attributes Blackstone's unpopularity to specific personality traits, saying his "determination...in pursuit of causes to which he committed himself could irritate as well as intimidate those of a more relaxed disposition. While quick to take offence at perceived slights on his own character and motives, he could also show surprising indifference to the effect his words and actions might have on others". This marked the beginning of his break with Oxford, which coincided with his growing influence outside the university. In 1759 Lord Bute, Prince George's official tutor, requested copies of Blackstone's lectures, which he forwarded. Later that year Blackstone was paid £200 by the Prince, who became an "appreciative, loyal, and soon to be incomparably influential patron". This patronage, and Blackstone's purchase of a set of chambers in the Inner Temple, also transferring to that Inn, were significant steps in his departure from Oxford. In 1759 Blackstone published another two works, The Great Charter and the Charter of the Forest, with other authentic Instruments, described as a "major piece of pioneering scholarship" leading to Blackstone's election to the Society of Antiquaries in February 1761, and A Treatise on the Law of Descents in Fee Simple, which was later used, almost verbatim, as chapters 14 and 15 of the Commentaries.

== London ==
=== Work at the Bar ===
With sponsorship from the Prince of Wales and his success with the Analysis, Blackstone began work as a barrister, although he kept up his lecture series at Oxford. By 1760 he had become "a very eminent figure indeed in the world of letters", and his legal practice grew as a result. Although not considered a great barrister of the period, he maintained a steady flow of cases, primarily in the King's Bench and Exchequer of Pleas. On the death of the third Earl of Abingdon, Blackstone was retained as counsel for the executors and trustees to oversee the family's attempts to pay off debts and meet other obligations. On 5 May 1761 he married Sarah Clitherow, a member of a family of lesser gentry from Middlesex. Their first child, William Bertie Blackstone, born 21 August 1762, did not survive to adulthood. Seven more children were born: Henry, James, Sarah, Mary, Philippa, William, Charles, and George, who also died in childhood. The Blackstones had a large estate in Wallingford in Berkshire, including 120 acres (46 ha) of pastureland around the River Thames and the right of advowson over St Peter's Church.

In February 1761 Blackstone was considered as a potential Tory candidate for the rotten borough of Hindon in Wiltshire. After consultation with friends, he agreed to this prospect – at the same time refusing the offer of appointment as Lord Chief Justice of Ireland. On 30 March 1761 he was returned for Hindon, and took his seat. This did not limit his legal work, initially, with the seat being given without a requirement to attend or vote in a particular way, and the grant of a patent of precedence at the same time actually increased the demand on his time. Court records show him pleading before Lord Mansfield in the Court of King's Bench soon after his election, and acting as counsel in Tonson v Collins, a copyright case, Thiquet v Bath, an important case on international law, and R v d'Eon, acting for the prosecution in a feud over Louis XV's newly appointed cross-dressing Ambassador to the United Kingdom.

With this increase in his practice, Blackstone also saw an increase in his out-of-court work, writing opinions and recommendations for various Oxford colleges, the MP Jonathan Rashleigh and the fourth Earl of Abingdon, who paid him to draft several private Acts of Parliament. In December 1761, he asked Lord Shelburne, a patron, for his assistance in gaining appointment as Chief Justice of Chester, writing again in July 1762 to "prevail upon Lord Bute to recommend me to his Majesty's Notice", anticipating an upcoming vacancy in the Court of Common Pleas. Parliamentary service was considered a "desirable if never absolutely essential qualification for would-be English judges", something that did not necessarily bode well for Blackstone. Naturally inarticulate and reticent, he was an infrequent and "indifferent" speaker during his first session of Parliament, speaking only 14 times in seven years. His chosen career did lend him to politics, in that the lawyers in the House of Commons were often added to select committees to provide them with technical expertise in drafting legislation. He again applied for a judicial post in December 1762, after an opening in the Exchequer of Pleas came up, but lost to George Perrott, a leading Exchequer barrister. The next five vacancies also failed to go to Blackstone, after the appointment of Lord Camden (a Whig) as Lord Chancellor.

=== Commentaries on the Laws of England ===
In 1765 Blackstone announced his resignation from the Vinerian Chair, effective after his 1766 lectures. These were divided into two 14-lecture series, on "private wrongs" and "public wrongs" delivered between 12 February and 24 April. At this point Blackstone had published nothing new since A Treatise on the Law of Descents in Fee Simple in 1759. The decision to resign was most likely due to the increasing demands of his legal practice and the reduced profit from the lectures, which, after peaking at £340 in 1762, dropped to £239 a year later and to £203 for the final round of lectures in 1765–6. In response, Blackstone decided to publish a new book – Commentaries on the Laws of England. The first volume was published in November 1765, bringing the author £1,600 – the full work would eventually bring in over £14,000. Owen Ruffhead described Volume I as "masterly", noting that "Mr Blackstone is perhaps the first who has treated the body of the law in a liberal, elegant and constitutional manner. A vein of good sense and moderation runs through every page". Every copy was sold within six months, and the second and third volumes, published in October 1766 and June 1768, received a similar reception. The fourth and final volume appeared in 1769, dealing with Criminal Law. With the financial success of the Commentaries, Blackstone moved in 1768 from his London property in Carey Fields to No. 55 Lincoln's Inn Fields. Neighbours included the Sardinian ambassador, Sir Walter Rawlinson, Lord Northington, John Morton and the Third Earl of Abingdon, making it an appropriate house for a "great and able Lawyer".

Blackstone's treatise was republished in 1770, 1773, 1774, 1775, 1778 and in a posthumous edition in 1783. Reprints of the first edition, intended for practical use rather than antiquary interest, were published until the 1870s in England and Wales, and a working version by Henry John Stephen, first published in 1841, was reprinted until after the Second World War. The first American edition was produced in 1772; prior to this, over 1,000 copies had already been sold in the Thirteen Colonies.

=== Judge ===
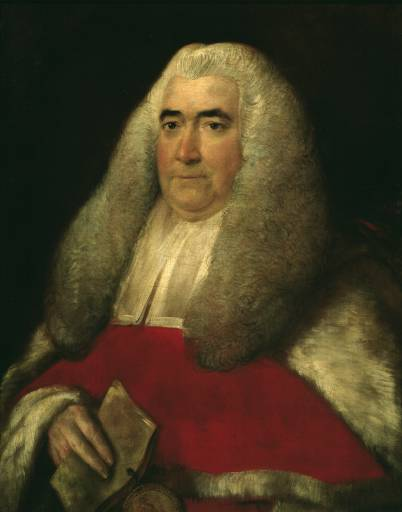
Blackstone in 1774, after his appointment as a Justice of the Court of King's Bench, portrait by Thomas Gainsborough

Even after the publication of the Commentaries, Blackstone's chances of judicial appointment remained slim. While he was old enough, experienced enough and widely respected, the presence of Lord Camden as Lord Chancellor and Blackstone's lack of aristocratic patrons at the time hindered his chances. In January 1770, however, Lord Grafton's government began to fall, with Camden resigning on 17 January and Solicitor General John Dunning, following him. George III appointed Lord North as Prime Minister, and North picked Charles Yorke as Lord Chancellor. Yorke's death on 20 January, after holding the position for less than three days, left several important legal positions within the government open. As such, Blackstone, now MP for Westbury, was apparently approached to become Solicitor-General; he refused, not wanting to deal with the complicated duties attached to the position.

On 9 February 1770 – apparently with the intervention of the King, and possibly Lord Mansfield – Blackstone became a Justice of the Common Pleas, succeeding Edward Clive, and was made a Serjeant-at-Law on 12 February. After only four days it was announced that Joseph Yates was to move to the Common Pleas, and Blackstone was again sworn in as a judge, this time of the Court of King's Bench. This was apparently due to Yates' poor health; Lord Mansfield ran a busy court as Lord Chief Justice, and it was felt that his transfer to the Common Pleas was for the best. Others commented that it was instead due to political and judicial disagreement, with Yates unwilling to stomach the changes which Mansfield made to English law. Blackstone sat regularly as a judge, despite bouts of ill health, and also served on various circuit courts. Prest describes him as an "exceptionally careful, conscientious and well-respected judge ... his judgments ranging between narrowly framed technicalities [and] broad statements of public commentary". He was, however, considered a poor trial judge, being reversed on appeal more frequently than any of his peers.

Blackstone returned to the Common Pleas on 25 June 1770, having spent less than six months in the King's Bench; Jeremy Bentham asserted that this was due to Mansfield's having Blackstone removed similarly to his removal of Yates. Bentham asserted that in the King's Bench, Blackstone was "always in hot water", and that there was "heartburning" between the two; Bentham's account is considered dubious because historically, Mansfield and Blackstone had an excellent relationship, with the third volume of the Commentaries describing Mansfield as "a judge, whose masterly acquaintance with the law of nations was known and revered by every state in Europe". There is only one recorded King's Bench case, R v Proprietors of Birmingham Canal Navigation, in which Blackstone and Mansfield disagreed.

In the Common Pleas, Blackstone operated under a civil jurisdiction rather than a mixed civil and criminal one. This played to his strengths, and many of his decisions are considered farsighted; the principle in Blaney v Hendricks, for example, that interest is due on an account where money was lent, which anticipated Section 3 of the Law Reform (Miscellaneous Provisions) Act 1934. Blackstone's decision in Goldswain's Case was later repeated by Lord Denning in Falmouth Boat Construction Co v Howell in 1950.

== Death ==
Blackstone had long suffered from gout, and by November 1779 also had a nervous disorder which caused dizziness, high blood pressure, and possibly diabetes. By 3 February 1780 he was too weak to write, and after "some Days almost totally insensible", he died on 14 February at age 56. After a service conducted by Bishop Barrington on 22 February, Blackstone was buried in the family vault under St Peter's Church, Wallingford. As his estate at his death was worth less than £15,000, William Eden secured a £400 annual royal pension for Sarah Blackstone. The initial reaction to Blackstone's death was subdued, but in December 1780 the Fellows of All Souls College agreed that "a Statue be erected to the memory of Sr W Blackstone deceased". Constructed by John Bacon, the life-sized statue of Blackstone in his judicial robes cost £539, and has rested in the Codrington Library (now the All Souls College Library) since 1872. His brother-in-law, James Clitherow, also published in 1781 two volumes of his law reports which added £1,287 to the estate, and in 1782 the Biographical History of Sir William Blackstone appeared.

== Legacy ==
A statue of Sir William Blackstone by Paul Wayland Bartlett in front of the E. Barrett Prettyman United States Courthouse in Washington, D.C.

Blackstone's primary legacy is his written work, specifically the Commentaries on the Laws of England. In England and America the Commentaries became the basis of university legal education. Demand for reprinted, abridged and translated versions was "almost inexhaustible" in the 18th and 19th centuries, although the Commentaries' emphasis on the sovereignty of Parliament drew ire. Alexis de Tocqueville described Blackstone as "an inferior writer, without liberality of mind or depth of judgment". Other commenters differ; one described him as "the core element in the British Enlightenment", comparing him to Montesquieu, Beccaria and Voltaire. Academics have said that the Commentaries were crucial in changing English Law from a system based on actions to a system of substantive law. At the time of publication, the common law of England was still, in some ways, in its infancy, with people uncertain as to what the law was. The Commentaries helped to solidify legal thinking. At the same time, legal education had stalled, and Blackstone's work gave the Law "at least a veneer of scholarly respectability". William Searle Holdsworth, one of Blackstone's successors as Vinerian Professor, argued that "if the Commentaries had not been written when they were written, I think it very doubtful that [the United States], and other English speaking countries would have so universally adopted the [common] law."

The Commentaries had a particular influence in the United States; James Iredell, an original Associate Justice of the Supreme Court of the United States wrote that the Commentaries were "Books admirably calculated for a young Student, and indeed may instruct the most learned ... Pleasure and Instruction go hand in hand." When the Commentaries were first printed in North America, 1,400 copies were ordered for Philadelphia alone. Academics have also noted the early reliance of the Supreme Court on the Commentaries, probably due to a lack of US legal tradition at that time. The US academic Robert Ferguson notes that

all our formative documents – the Declaration of Independence, the Constitution, the Federalist Papers and the seminal decisions of the Supreme Court under John Marshall – were drafted by attorneys steeped in Sir William Blackstone's Commentaries on the Laws of England. So much was this the case that the Commentaries rank second only to the Bible as a literary and intellectual influence on the history of American institutions.

Even towards the end of the twentieth century, the Commentaries were cited in Supreme Court decisions between 10 and 12 times a year.

Within United States academia and practise, as well as within the judiciary, the Commentaries had a substantial impact; with the scarcity of law books on the frontier, they were "both the only law school and the only law library most American lawyers used to practise law in America for nearly a century after they were published." Blackstone had drawn up a plan for a dedicated School of Law, and submitted it to the University of Oxford; when the idea was rejected he included it in the Commentaries. It is from this plan that the modern system of American law schools comes. Subscribers to the first edition of Blackstone, and later readers who were profoundly influenced by it, include James Iredell, John Marshall, James Wilson, John Jay, John Adams, James Kent and Abraham Lincoln.

In the early 1920s the American Bar Association presented a statue of Blackstone to the English Bar Association; however, at the time, the sculpture was too tall to be placed in the Royal Courts of Justice in London. The sculpture, designed by Paul Wayland Bartlett was eventually cast in Europe and presented back to the US for display. Congress approved the placement of the sculpture in Washington, D.C., on 15 March 1943, and appropriated $10,000 for the installation. The bronze statue is a nine-foot (2.7 m) standing portrait of Blackstone wearing judicial robes and a long curly wig, holding a copy of Commentaries. It is placed on a tall granite base and stands on Constitution Avenue and 3rd Street NW. The town of Blackstone, Virginia, is named after him.

The North Wall Frieze in the courtroom of the Supreme Court of the United States depicts William Blackstone, as one of the most influential legal commenters in world history.

=== Blackstone's Ratio or Blackstone's Formulation ===
Among the most well-known of Blackstone's contributions to judicial theory is his own statement of the principle that it "is better that ten guilty persons escape than that one innocent suffer."

While this argument originates at least as far back as Genesis 18:23–32 in the Bible, as well as versions by Maimonides and Sir John Fortescue, Blackstone's analysis is the one picked up by Benjamin Franklin and others, so that the term has become known as "Blackstone's Ratio".

As John Adams, having studied Blackstone, put it:

It is more important that innocence should be protected, than it is, that guilt be punished; for guilt and crimes are so frequent in this world, that all of them cannot be punished.... when innocence itself, is brought to the bar and condemned, especially to die, the subject will exclaim, 'it is immaterial to me whether I behave well or ill, for virtue itself is no security.' And if such a sentiment as this were to take hold in the mind of the subject that would be the end of all security whatsoever.

Blackstone's Ratio is a maxim of English law, having been established as such within a few decades of Blackstone's work being published. It is also cited in courts and law in the US, and is strongly emphasised to American law students.

=== Criticism ===
English jurist Jeremy Bentham was a critic of Blackstone's theories. Others saw Blackstone's theories as inaccurate statements of English law, using the Constitutions of Clarendon, the Tractatus of Glanville and the 1689 Bill of Rights as particularly obvious examples of laws Blackstone omitted.

== Works ==
- Elements of Architecture (1743)
- An Abridgement of Architecture (1743)
- The Pantheon: A Vision (1747)
- An Analysis of the Laws of England (1756)
- A Discourse on the Study of the Law (1758)
- The Great Charter and the Charter of the Forest, with other authentic Instruments (1759)
- A Treatise on the Law of Descents in Fee Simple (1759)
- Commentaries on the Laws of England (1765–1769)
- Reports in K.B. and C.P., from 1746 to 1779 (1781)

== See also ==
- US Constitution, influences

== Bibliography ==
- Anthony Page; Wilfrid R. Prest, eds. (2018). Blackstone and His Critics. Oxford: Bloomsbury Publishing. ISBN 978-1-5099-1045-8. OCLC 1012615943.
- Alschuler, Albert (1994). "Sir William Blackstone and the shaping of American law". New Law Journal. 144 (6653). ISSN 0306-6479.
- Alschuler, Albert (1996). "Rediscovering Blackstone". University of Pennsylvania Law Review. 145 (1): 1–55. doi:10.2307/3312712. JSTOR 3312712.
- Bader, William D. (1995). "Some Thoughts on Blackstone, Precedent and Originalism". Vermont Law Review. 19 (5). ISSN 0145-2908.
- Cairns, J. (1984). "Blackstone, An English Institutist: Legal Literature and the Rise of the Nation State". Oxford Journal of Legal Studies. 4 (1): 318–360. doi:10.1093/ojls/4.3.318. ISSN 0143-6503.
- Doolittle, I.G. (1983). "Sir William Blackstone and his Commentaries on the Laws of England (1765–9): a Biographical Approach". Oxford Journal of Legal Studies. 3 (1): 99–112. doi:10.1093/ojls/3.1.99. ISSN 0143-6503.
- Hanbury, Harold G. (1959). "Blackstone as a Judge". American Journal of Legal History. 3 (1): 1–27. doi:10.2307/844140. ISSN 0002-9319. JSTOR 844140.
- Holdsworth, W.S. (1928). "Sir William Blackstone". Oregon Law Review. 7 (1). ISSN 0196-2043.
- Holdsworth, W.S. (1932). "Some Aspects of Blackstone and His Commentaries". Cambridge Law Journal. 4 (3): 261–285. doi:10.1017/S0008197300131927. ISSN 0008-1973. S2CID 144719136.
- Hutchinson, John (1902). "Blackstone, Sir William" . A catalogue of notable Middle Templars, with brief biographical notices (1 ed.). Canterbury: the Honourable Society of the Middle Temple. p. 22.
- Laeuchli, Ann Jordan. (2015). A bibliographical catalog of William Blackstone. Yale Law Library by William S. Hein & Co. OCLC 885030816.
- Lockmiller, David A. (1938). Sir William Blackstone. University of North Carolina Press. OCLC 1097575.
- Miles, Albert S. (2000). "Blackstone and his American Legacy". Australia & New Zealand Journal of Law and Education. 5 (2). ISSN 1327-7634.
- Milsom, S.F.C. (1991). "The Nature of Blackstone's Achievement". Oxford Journal of Legal Studies. 1 (1). ISSN 0143-6503.
- de Montmorency, J.E.G. (1917). "Sir William Blackstone". Journal of the Society of Comparative Legislation. 17 (1). ISSN 1479-5973.
- Odgers, William Blake (1918). "Sir William Blackstone". Yale Law Journal. 27 (1): 599–618. doi:10.2307/786216. ISSN 0044-0094. JSTOR 786216.
- Prest, Wilfrid (2008). William Blackstone: Law and Letters in the Eighteenth Century. Oxford University Press. ISBN 978-0-19-955029-6.
- Sainty, John (1993). The Judges of England 1272 -1990: a list of judges of the superior courts. Oxford: Selden Society. OCLC 29670782.
- Simpson, A.W.B. (1981). "The Rise and Fall of the Legal Treatise: Legal Principles and the Forms of Legal Literature". The University of Chicago Law Review. 48 (3): 632–679. doi:10.2307/1599330. ISSN 0041-9494. JSTOR 1599330.
- Waterman, Julian S. (1934). "Mansfield and Blackstone's Commentaries". The University of Chicago Law Review. 1 (4): 549–571. doi:10.2307/1596998. ISSN 0041-9494. JSTOR 1596998.

Legal offices
Preceded by Joseph Yates	Justice of the King's Bench; 1770	Succeeded by William Ashurst
Preceded by Edward Clive	Justice of the Common Pleas; 1770–1780	Succeeded by John Heath
Parliament of Great Britain
Preceded by James Calthorpe; William Mabbott	Member of Parliament for Hindon; 1761–1768; With: Edward Morant	Succeeded by John St Leger Douglas; William Hussey
Preceded by Peregrine Bertie; Chauncy Townsend	Member of Parliament for Westbury; 1768–1770; With: Peregrine Bertie	Succeeded by Peregrine Bertie; Charles Dillon
Academic offices
New office	Vinerian Professor of English Law; 1758–1766	Succeeded by Sir Robert Chambers
