= Justice =

Concept of moral fairness and administration of the law

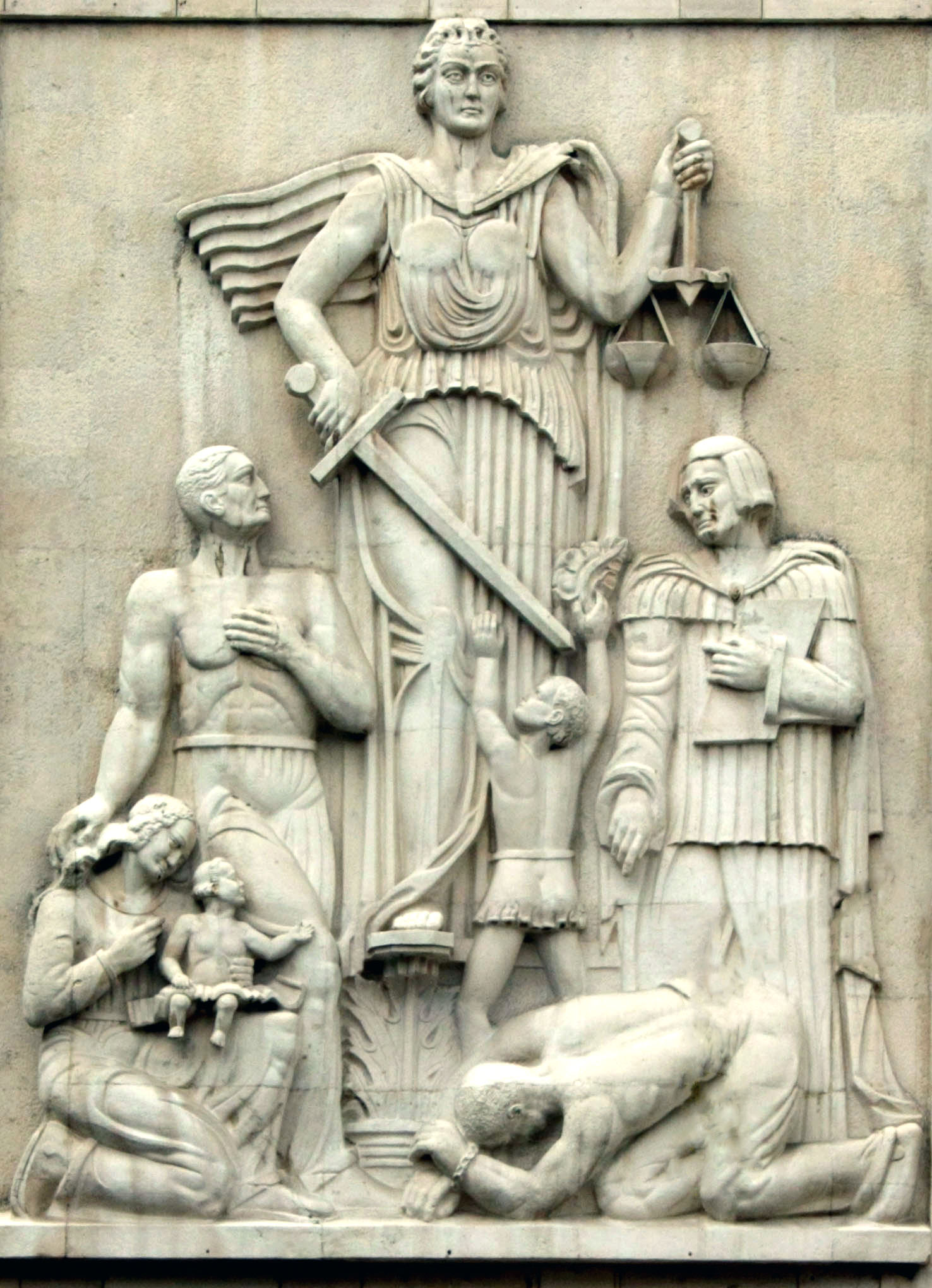
Allegorical representation of justice, Palace of Justice, Tehran.

In its broadest sense, justice is the treatment of individuals fairly. According to the Stanford Encyclopedia of Philosophy, the most plausible candidate for a core definition comes from the Institutes of Justinian, a 6th-century codification of Roman law, where justice is defined as "the constant and perpetual will to render to each his due".

== History ==
Early Western theories of justice were developed in part by Ancient Greek philosophers such as Plato in his work The Republic, and Aristotle, in his Nicomachean Ethics and Politics. Saint Augustine (354-430) emphasized the importance of justice, expressing the opinion that, without justice, "kingdoms are nothing but gangs of criminals on a large scale".

The classical confucian theory of justice developed around the same time, and had little in common with Western theories of justice. Instead, it posited that justice was a personal and public virtue, but did not include freedom or equality, and was not part of the law. The law itself was seen as promoting order rather than justice.

Modern-day Western notions of justice have roots in Christian theology, which largely follows the divine command theory, according to which God dictates morality and determines whether or not an action is seen as morally "good". This, in turn, determines justice.

Western thinkers later advanced different theories about where the foundations of justice lie. In the 17th century, philosophers such as John Locke held that justice derives from natural law. Jean-Jacques Rousseau became a prominent advocate of social contract theory, which holds that justice arises from a mutual agreement among members of society to be governed within a political system.

Modern frameworks include concepts such as distributive justice, utilitarianism, retributive justice and restorative justice.

In broad terms, distributive justice considers what is fair based on what goods are to be distributed, between whom they are to be distributed, and what the proper distribution is; utilitarian theories look forward to the future consequences of punishment; retributive theories look back to particular acts of wrongdoing and attempt to match them with appropriate punishment; and restorative theories look at the needs of victims and society and seek to repair the harms from wrongdoing. Theories of retributive justice say justice is served by punishing wrongdoers, whereas restorative justice (also sometimes called "reparative justice") is an approach to justice that focuses on the needs of victims and offenders.

== Platonic justice ==
Justice, according to Plato, is about balance and harmony. It represents the right relationship between conflicting aspects within an individual or a community. He defines justice as everyone having and doing what they are responsible for or what belongs to them. In other words, a just person is someone who contributes to society according to their unique abilities and receives what is proportionate to their contribution. They are in the right place, always striving to do their best, and reciprocating what they receive fairly and equitably. This applies both at the individual level and at the organizational and societal levels.

To illustrate these ideas, Plato describes a person as having three parts: reason, spirit, and desire. These parallel the three parts of a city in his philosophy, which he describes through the metaphor of a chariot: it functions effectively when the charioteer, representative of reason, successfully controls the two horses, symbolizing spirit and desire. Continuing on these themes, Plato theorizes that those who love wisdom, or philosophers, are the most ideal to govern because only they truly comprehend the nature of the good. Just like one would seek a doctor's expertise in matters of health rather than a farmer's, so should the city entrust its governance to someone knowledgeable about the good, rather than to politicians who might prioritize power over people's genuine needs. Socrates later used the parable of the ship to illustrate this point: the unjust city is like a ship in open ocean, crewed by a powerful but drunken captain (the common people), a group of untrustworthy advisors who try to manipulate the captain into giving them power over the ship's course (the politicians), and a navigator (the philosopher), the latter of whom being the only one who knows how to get the ship to port. Socrates said that a group could not commit justice successfully if members of that group were unjust to each other.

Aristotle saw the word justice as somewhat synonymous to virtue, while at the same time also referring to a particular form of virtue: giving people what they are deserving of.

== Divinity and religious conceptions of justice ==
Advocates of divine command theory say that justice and the whole of morality is the authoritative command of God. Murder is wrong and must be punished, for instance, because God says it so. Some versions of the theory assert that God must be obeyed because of the nature of God's relationship with humanity, others assert that God must be obeyed because God is goodness itself, and thus doing God's command would be best for everyone.

An early meditation on the divine command theory by Plato can be found in his dialogue, Euthyphro. Called the Euthyphro dilemma, it goes as follows: "Is what is morally good commanded by the gods because it is morally good, or is it morally good because it is commanded by the gods?" The implication is that if the latter is true, then justice is beyond mortal understanding; if the former is true, then morality exists independently from the gods and is therefore subject to the judgment of mortals. A response, popularized in two contexts by Immanuel Kant and C. S. Lewis, is that it is deductively valid to say that the existence of an objective morality implies the existence of God and vice versa.

Jewish, Christian, and Muslim theology traditionally follow that justice is a present, real, right, and specifically, governing concept, along with mercy, and that justice is ultimately derived from and held by God. According to the Bible, such institutions like the Mosaic Law were created by God to require the Israelites to live by and apply God's standards of justice.

The Hebrew Bible describes God as saying about the Judeo-Christian-Islamic patriarch Abraham: "No, for I have chosen him, that he may charge his children and his household after him to keep the way of the Lord by doing righteousness and justice;...." (Genesis 18:19, NRSV). The Psalmist describes God as having "Righteousness and justice [as] the foundation of [His] throne;...." (Psalms 89:14, NRSV).

The New Testament also describes God and Jesus Christ as having and displaying justice, often in comparison with God displaying and supporting mercy (Matthew 5:7).

In Buddhist ethics, justice is not defined by individuals "receiving their due," as in some frameworks, but by the transformation of suffering for all sentient beings by addressing their ignorance and leading them to enlightenment with skillful actions rooted in generosity, virtue, and the development of universal goodwill and compassion. The concept of karma is understood not as a system of rewards and punishments, but as the continuation of actions, thoughts, and intentions that shape future experience within an interconnected web of life. Central to this view are the principles of all beings having Buddha nature, interbeing with a deep interdependence of all things, dependent origination, which states phenomena arise in dependence upon other phenomena, and non-duality, which challenges rigid distinctions between self and other, or right and wrong as fixed absolutes. Justice, from this perspective, does not consist of assigning blame or enforcing penalties, but of recognizing shared responsibility and cultivating compassion, mindfulness, and understanding that leads beings to enlightenment and a Buddhist form of restorative justice. The notion that individuals inherently deserve either suffering or reward is often critiqued as a misinterpretation of karma that reinforces ego and separation. Instead, Buddhist justice emphasizes developing compassion, reducing suffering for all sentient beings, and supporting conditions that can lead being to enlightenment. This restorative and transformative orientation contrasts with retributive models focused on individual deserts, offering a vision of justice rooted in collective liberation rather than reparation.

== Natural law ==
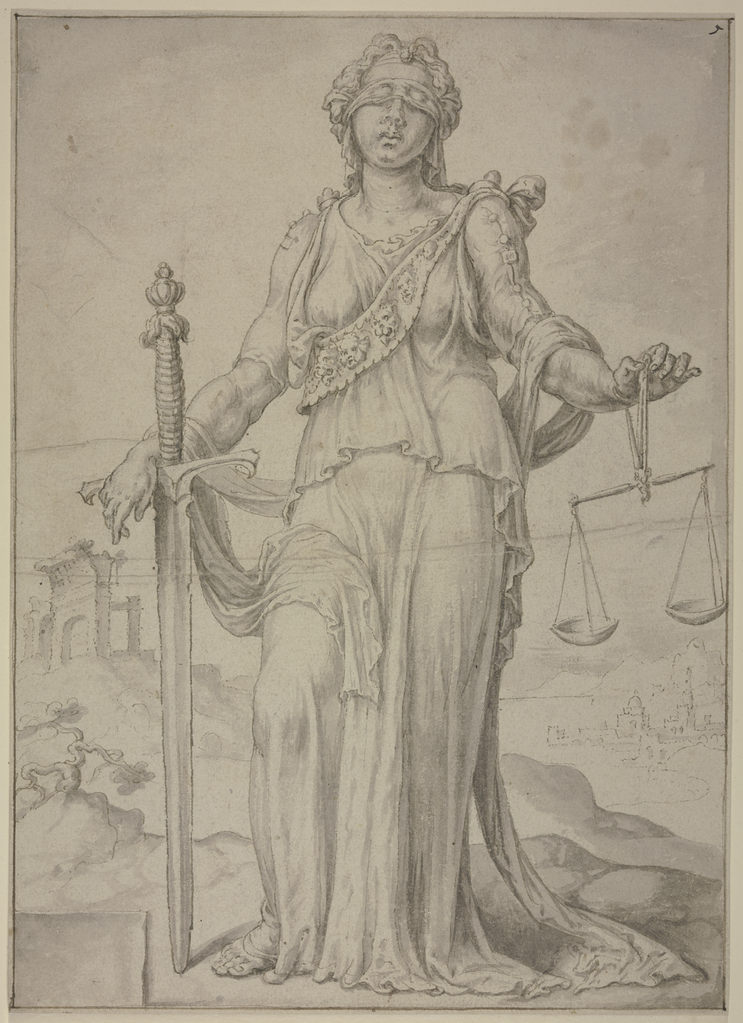
Justitia by Maarten van Heemskerck, 1556. Justitia carries symbolic items such as: a sword, scales and a blindfold.

Many have claimed that justice is a part of natural law. Natural law is a philosophical and legal theory that posits the existence of a set of inherent laws derived from nature and universal moral principles, which are discoverable through reason. In ethics, natural law theory asserts that certain rights and moral values are inherent in human nature and can be understood universally, independent of enacted laws or societal norms. In jurisprudence, natural law holds that there are objective legal standards based on morality that underlie and inform the creation, interpretation, and application of human-made laws. This contrasts with positive law (as in legal positivism), which emphasizes that laws are rules created by human authorities and are not necessarily connected to moral principles. Aquinas argues that because human beings have reason, and because reason is a spark of the divine, all human lives are sacred and of infinite value compared to any other created object, meaning everyone is fundamentally equal and bestowed with an intrinsic basic set of rights that no one can remove.

Modern natural law theory was used in challenging the theory of the divine right of kings, and became an alternative justification for the establishment of a social contract, positive law, and government—and thus legal rights—in the form of classical republicanism. John Locke was a proponent of natural law, stressing its role in the justification of property rights and the right to revolution. Natural law is closely related to the concept of natural rights. Indeed, many philosophers, jurists and scholars use natural law synonymously with natural rights or natural justice; others distinguish between natural law and natural right. Some scholars note natural law has been used by philosophers in a different sense from those mentioned above, e.g. for the law of the strongest, which can be observed to hold among all members of the animal kingdom, or as the principle of self-preservation, inherent as an instinct in all living beings.

=== Despotism and skepticism ===
In Republic by Plato, the character Thrasymachus argues that justice is the interest of the strong – merely a name for what the powerful or cunning ruler has imposed on the people.

=== Mutual agreement ===
Advocates of the social contract say that justice is derived from the mutual agreement of everyone; or, in many versions, from what they would agree to under hypothetical conditions including equality and absence of bias. This account is considered further below, under 'Justice as Fairness'. The absence of bias refers to an equal ground for all people involved in a disagreement (or trial in some cases).

=== Subordinate value ===
According to utilitarian thinkers including John Stuart Mill, justice is not as fundamental as we often think. Rather, it is derived from the more basic standard of rightness, consequentialism: what is right is what has the best consequences (usually measured by the total or average welfare caused). So, the proper principles of justice are those that tend to have the best consequences. These rules may turn out to be familiar ones such as keeping contracts; but equally, they may not, depending on the facts about real consequences. Either way, what is important is those consequences, and justice is important, if at all, only as derived from that fundamental standard. Mill tries to explain our mistaken belief that justice is overwhelmingly important by arguing that it derives from two natural human tendencies: our desire to retaliate against those who hurt us, or the feeling of self-defense and our ability to put ourselves imaginatively in another's place, sympathy. So, when we see someone harmed, we project ourselves into their situation and feel a desire to retaliate on their behalf. If this process is the source of our feelings about justice, that ought to undermine our confidence in them.

== Theories ==
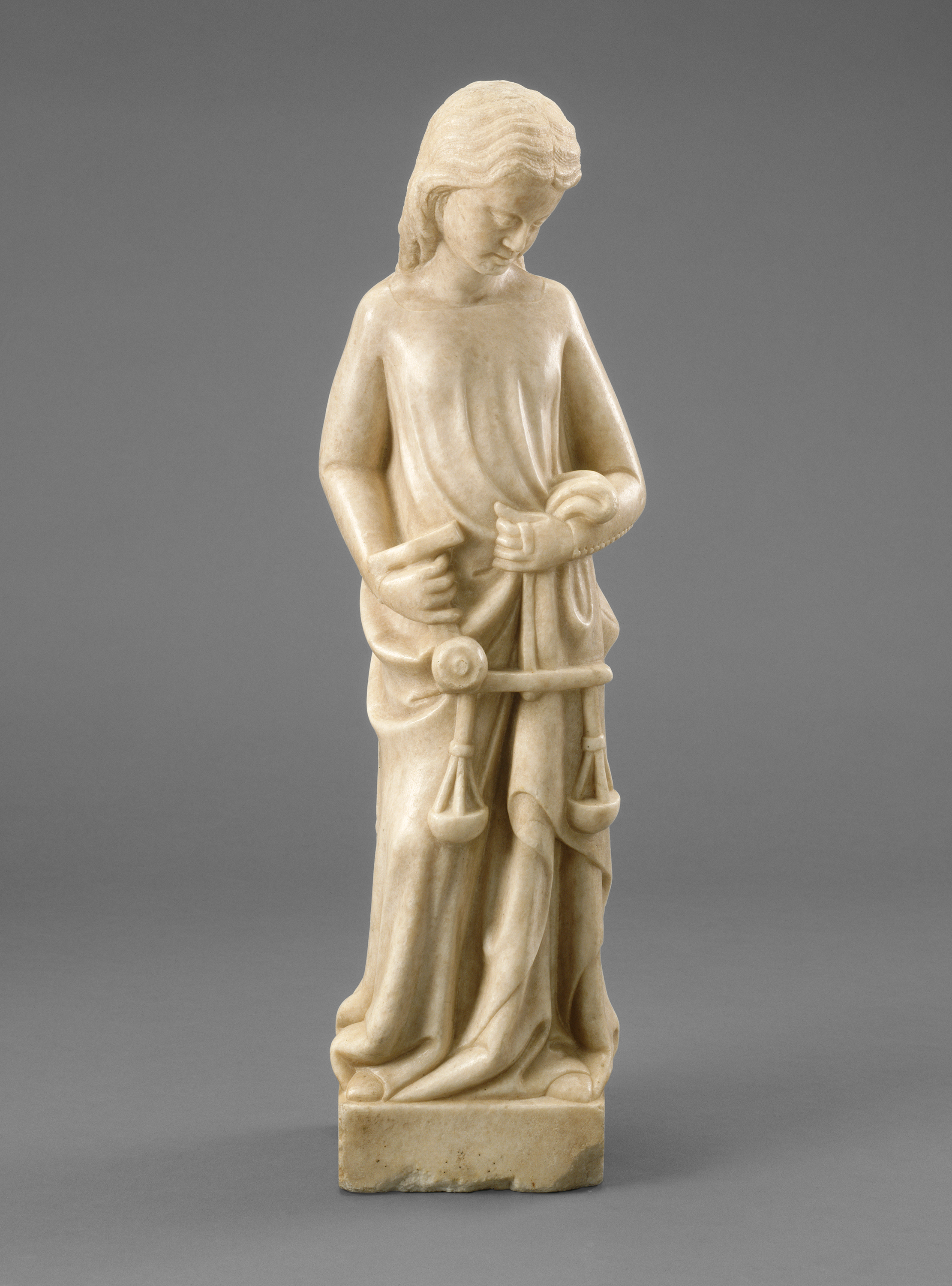
Bonino da Campione, Justice, c. 1357, National Gallery of Art

It has been said that 'systematic' or 'programmatic' political and moral philosophy in the West begins, in Plato's Republic, with the question, 'What is Justice?' According to most contemporary theories of justice, justice is overwhelmingly important: John Rawls claimed that "Justice is the first virtue of social institutions, as truth is of systems of thought." In classical approaches, evident from Plato through to Rawls, the concept of 'justice' is always construed in logical or 'etymological' opposition to the concept of injustice. Such approaches cite various examples of injustice, as problems which a theory of justice must overcome. A number of post-World War II approaches do, however, challenge that seemingly obvious dualism between those two concepts. Justice can be thought of as distinct from benevolence, charity, prudence, mercy, generosity, or compassion, although these dimensions are regularly understood to also be interlinked. Justice is one of the cardinal virtues. Metaphysical justice has often been associated with concepts of fate, reincarnation or Divine Providence, i.e., with a life in accordance with a cosmic plan.

The equivalence of justice and fairness has been historically and culturally established.

=== Instrumental theories of justice ===
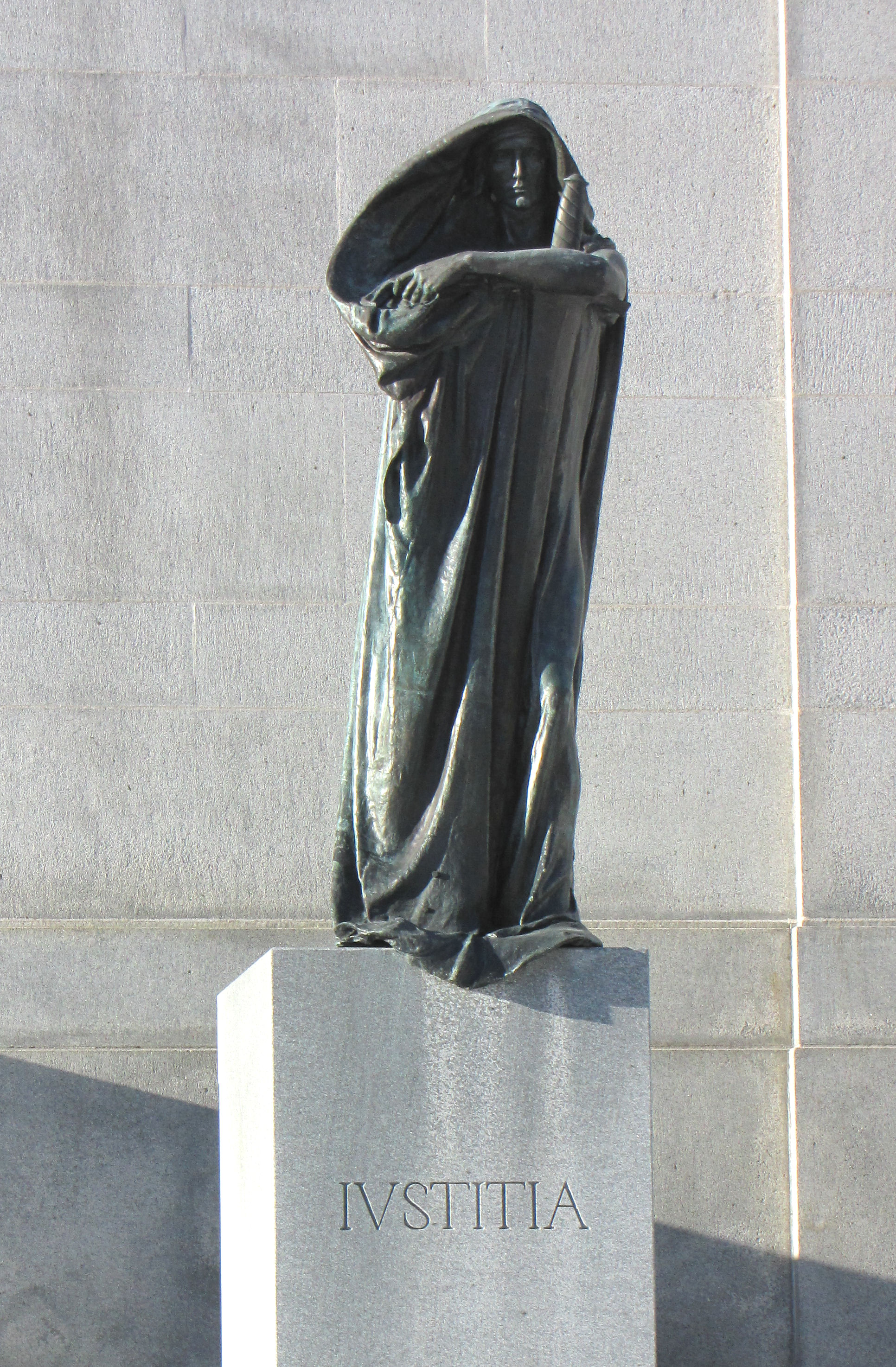
Walter Seymour Allward's Justitia (Justice), outside Supreme Court of Canada, Ottawa, Ontario, Canada

Instrumental theories of justice look at the consequences of punishment for wrongdoing, looking at questions such as:

1. why punish?
2. who should be punished?
3. what punishment should they receive?

=== Utilitarian justice ===
According to the utilitarian, justice is the maximization of the total or average welfare across all relevant individuals. Utilitarianism fights crime in three ways:

1. Deterrence. The credible threat of punishment might lead people to make different choices; well-designed threats might lead people to make choices that maximize welfare. This matches some strong intuitions about just punishment: that it should generally be proportional to the crime. Successful deterrence would reduce crime statistics.
2. Rehabilitation. Punishment might make "bad people" into "better" ones. For the utilitarian, all that "bad person" can mean is "person who's likely to cause unwanted things (like suffering)". So, utilitarianism could recommend punishment that changes someone such that they are less likely to cause bad things. Successful rehabilitation would reduce recidivism.
3. Security/Incapacitation. Perhaps there are people who are irredeemable causers of bad things. If so, imprisoning them might maximize welfare by limiting their opportunities to cause harm and therefore the benefit lies within protecting society.

So, the reason for punishment is the maximization of welfare, and punishment should be of whomever, and of whatever form and severity, are needed to meet that goal. This may sometimes justify punishing the innocent, or inflicting disproportionately severe punishments, when that will have the best consequences overall (perhaps executing a few suspected shoplifters live on television would be an effective deterrent to shoplifting, for instance). It also suggests that punishment might turn out never to be right, depending on the facts about what actual consequences it has.

=== Retributive and Restorative justice ===
Retributive justice argues that consequentialism is wrong, as it argues that all guilty individuals deserve appropriate punishment, based on the conviction that punishment should be proportional to the crime and for all the guilty. However, it is sometimes said that retributivism is merely revenge in disguise. However, there are differences between retribution and revenge: the former is impartial and has a scale of appropriateness, whereas the latter is personal and potentially unlimited in scale.

Restorative justice attempts to repair the harm that was done to the victims. It encourages active participation from victims and encourages offenders to take responsibility for their actions. Restorative justice fosters dialogue between victim and offender and shows the highest rates of victim satisfaction and offender accountability. Meta-analyses of the effectivity of restorative justice show no improvement in recidivism.

==== Welfare-maximization ====
According to the utilitarian, justice requires the maximization of the total or average welfare across all relevant individuals. This may require sacrifice of some for the good of others, so long as everyone's good is taken impartially into account. Utilitarianism, in general, says that the standard of justification for actions, institutions, or the whole world, is impartial welfare consequentialism, and only indirectly, if at all, to do with rights, property, need, or any other non-utilitarian criterion. These other criteria might be indirectly important, to the extent that human welfare involves them. But even then, such demands as human rights would only be elements in the calculation of overall welfare, not uncrossable barriers to action.

=== Mixed theories ===
Some modern philosophers have said that Utilitarian and Retributive theories are not mutually exclusive. For example, Andrew von Hirsch, in his 1976 book Doing Justice, suggested that we have a moral obligation to punish greater crimes more than lesser ones. However, so long as we adhere to that constraint then utilitarian ideals would play a significant secondary role.

=== Distributive justice ===
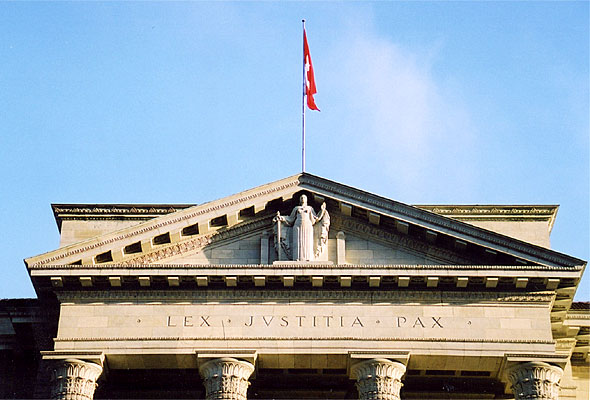
Lex, justitia, pax (Latin for "Law, justice, peace") on the pediment of the Supreme Court of Switzerland

Theories of distributive justice need to answer three questions:

1. What goods are to be distributed? Is it to be wealth, power, respect, opportunities or some combination of these things?
2. Between what entities are they to be distributed? Humans (dead, living, future), sentient beings, the members of a single society, nations?
3. What is the proper distribution? Equal, meritocratic, according to social status, according to need, based on property rights and non-aggression?

Distributive justice theorists generally do not answer questions of who has the right to enforce a particular favored distribution, while property rights theorists say that there is no "favored distribution". Rather, distribution should be based simply on whatever distribution results from lawful interactions or transactions (that is, transactions which are not illicit).

==== Fairness ====
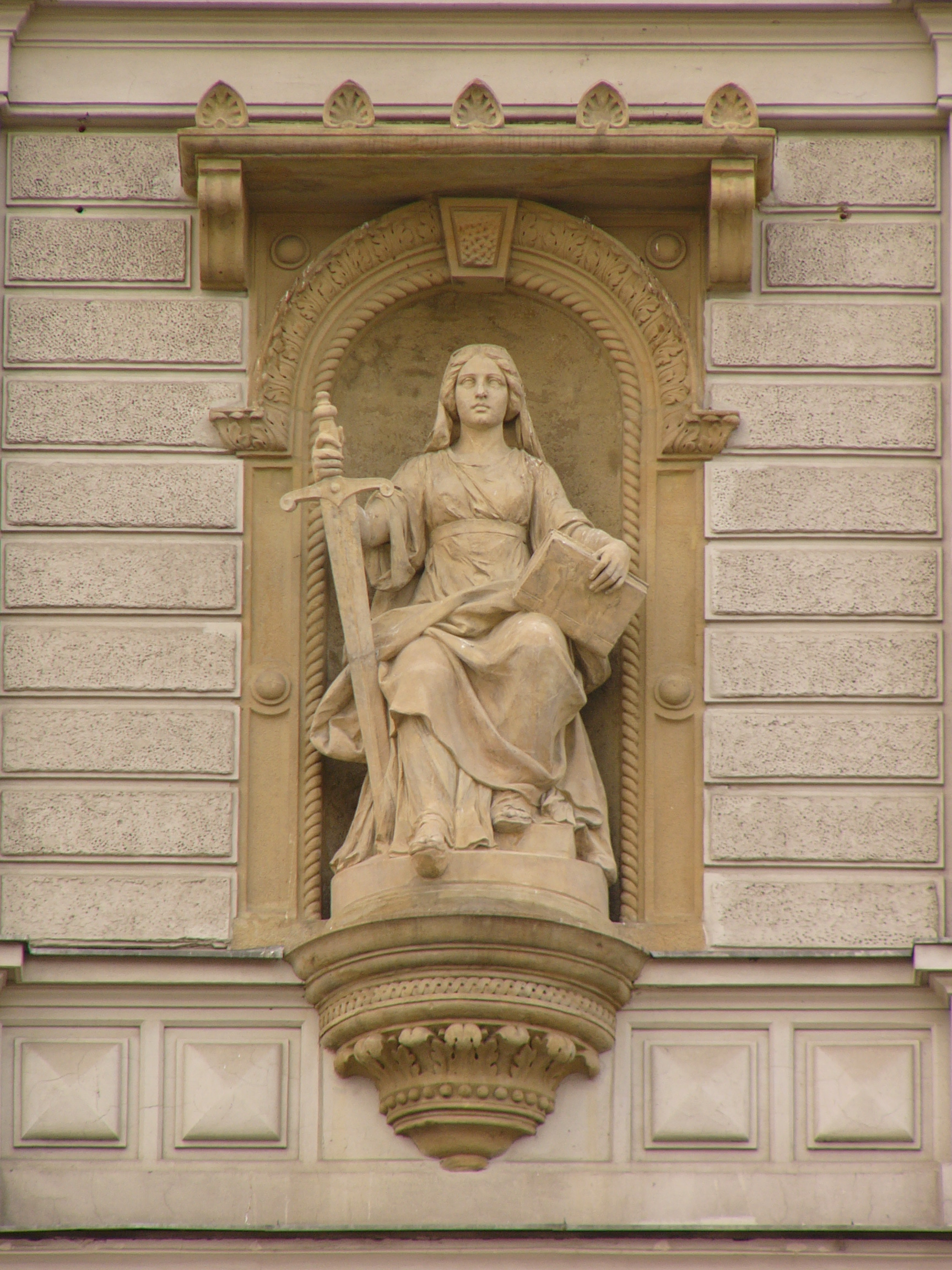
J. L. Urban, statue of Lady Justice at court building in Olomouc, Czech Republic

In his A Theory of Justice, John Rawls used a social contract argument to show that justice, and especially distributive justice, is a form of fairness: an impartial distribution of goods. Rawls asks us to imagine ourselves behind a veil of ignorance that denies us all knowledge of our personalities, social statuses, moral characters, wealth, talents and life plans, and then asks what theory of justice we would choose to govern our society when the veil is lifted, if we wanted to do the best that we could for ourselves. We do not know who in particular we are, and therefore can not bias the decision in our own favor. So, the decision-in-ignorance models fairness, because it excludes selfish bias. Rawls said that each of us would reject the utilitarian theory of justice that we should maximize welfare (see above) because of the risk that we might turn out to be someone whose own good is sacrificed for greater benefits for others. Instead, we would endorse Rawls's two principles of justice:

- Each person is to have an equal right to the most extensive total system of equal basic liberties compatible with a similar system of liberty for all.
- Social and economic inequalities are to be arranged so that they are both
  - to the greatest benefit of the least advantaged, consistent with the just savings principle, and
  - attached to offices and positions open to all under conditions of fair equality of opportunity.

This imagined choice justifies these principles as the principles of justice for us, because we would agree to them in a fair decision procedure. Rawls's theory distinguishes two kinds of goods – the good of liberty rights and social and economic goods, i.e. wealth, income, and power – and applies different distributions to them – equality between citizens for liberty rights and equality unless inequality improves the position of the worst off for social and economic goods.

In one sense, theories of distributive justice may assert that everyone should get what they deserve. Theories vary on the meaning of what is "deserved". The main distinction is between theories that say the basis of just deserts ought to be held equally by everyone, and therefore derive egalitarian accounts of distributive justice – and theories that say the basis of just deserts is unequally distributed on the basis of, for instance, hard work, and therefore derive accounts of distributive justice by which some should have more than others.

Studies at UCLA in 2008 have indicated that reactions to fairness are "wired" into the brain and that, "Fairness is activating the same part of the brain that responds to food in rats... This is consistent with the notion that being treated fairly satisfies a basic need". Research conducted in 2003 at Emory University involving capuchin monkeys demonstrated that other cooperative animals also possess such a sense and that "inequity aversion may not be uniquely human".

==== Property rights ====
In Anarchy, State, and Utopia, Robert Nozick said that distributive justice is not a matter of the whole distribution matching an ideal pattern, but of each individual entitlement having the right kind of history. It is just that a person has some good (especially, some property right) if and only if they came to have it by a history made up entirely of events of two kinds:

- Just acquisition, especially by working on unowned things; and
- Just transfer, that is free gift, sale or other agreement, but not theft (i.e. by force or fraud).

If the chain of events leading up to the person having something meets this criterion, they are entitled to it: that they possess it is just, and what anyone else does or does not have or need is irrelevant.

On the basis of this theory of distributive justice, Nozick said that all attempts to redistribute goods according to an ideal pattern, without the consent of their owners, are theft. In particular, redistributive taxation is theft.

Some property rights theorists (such as Nozick) also take a consequentialist view of distributive justice and say that property rights based justice also has the effect of maximizing the overall wealth of an economic system. They explain that voluntary (non-coerced) transactions always have a property called Pareto efficiency. The result is that the world is better off in an absolute sense and no one is worse off. They say that respecting property rights maximizes the number of Pareto efficient transactions in the world and minimized the number of non-Pareto efficient transactions in the world (i.e. transactions where someone is made worse off). The result is that the world will have generated the greatest total benefit from the limited, scarce resources available in the world. Further, this will have been accomplished without taking anything away from anyone unlawfully.

==== Meritocracy ====
According to meritocratic theories, goods, especially wealth and social status, should be distributed to match individual merit, which is usually understood as some combination of talent and hard work. According to needs-based theories, goods, especially such basic goods as food, shelter, and medical care, should be distributed to meet individuals' basic needs for them. According to contribution-based theories, goods should be distributed to match an individual's contribution to the overall social good.

== Ideals and standards ==
=== Equality and Equity before the law ===
In political theory, liberalism includes two traditional elements: liberty and equality. Most contemporary theories of justice emphasize the concept of equality, including Rawls' theory of justice as fairness. For Ronald Dworkin, a complex notion of equality is the sovereign political virtue. Dworkin raises the question of whether society is under a duty of justice to help those responsible for the fact that they need help. Complications arise in distinguishing matters of choice and matters of chance, as well as justice for future generations in the redistribution of resources that he advocates.

Law raises important and complex issues about equality, fairness, and justice. There is an old saying that 'All are equal before the law'. The belief in equality before the law is called legal egalitarianism. In criticism of this belief, the author Anatole France said in 1894, "In its majestic equality, the law forbids rich and poor alike to sleep under bridges, beg in the streets, and steal loaves of bread." With this saying, France illustrated the fundamental shortcoming of a theory of legal equality that remains blind to social inequality; the same law applied to all may have disproportionately harmful effects on the least powerful.

=== Proportionality ===
Proportionality in justice refers to the principle that rewards and punishments should correspond directly and appropriately to the merit or gravity of actions. Rooted in ancient philosophical and legal traditions, proportionality ensures fairness and balance by aligning consequences with responsibility. Plato articulated an early philosophical basis for proportionality, describing justice as a harmonious state in which each individual fulfills the role best suited to them and receives what corresponds to their actions and nature (Republic, Book IV, 433a–b). This principle has significantly influenced modern legal doctrines, particularly in criminal law, ethics, and human rights, emphasizing fairness and avoiding arbitrary or excessive punishment.

=== Social justice ===
Social justice encompasses the just relationship between individuals and their society, often considering how privileges, opportunities, and wealth ought to be distributed among individuals. Social justice is also associated with social mobility, especially the ease with which individuals and families may move between social strata. Social justice is distinct from cosmopolitanism, which is the idea that all people belong to a single global community with a shared morality. Social justice is also distinct from egalitarianism, which is the idea that all people are equal in terms of status, value, or rights, as social justice theories do not all require equality. For example, sociologist George C. Homans suggested that the root of the concept of justice is that each person should receive rewards that are proportional to their contributions.

Economist Friedrich Hayek said that the concept of social justice was meaningless, saying that justice is a result of individual behavior and unpredictable market forces. Social justice is closely related to the concept of relational justice, which is about the just relationship with individuals who possess features in common such as nationality, or who are engaged in cooperation or negotiation.

=== Equity ===
In legal theory, equity is seen as the concept connecting law to justice, since law cannot be applied without reference to justice. In that context, justice is seen as 'the rationale and the ethical foundation of equity'. One approach towards equity in justice is community policing. Marxism is a needs-based theory, expressed succinctly in Marx's slogan "from each according to his ability, to each according to his need".

=== Equality of outcome ===
Equality of outcome, equality of condition, or equality of results is a political concept which is central to some political ideologies and is used in some political discourse, often in contrast to the term equality of opportunity. It describes a state in which all people have approximately the same material wealth and income, or in which the general economic conditions of everyone's lives are alike.

=== Relational justice ===
Relational justice examines individual connections and societal relationships, focusing on normative and political aspects. Rawls' theory of justice aims to distribute social goods to benefit the poor, but does not consider power relations, political structures, or social meanings. Even Rawls' self-respect is not compatible with distribution. Iris Marion Young charges that distributive accounts of justice fail to provide an adequate way of conceptualizing political justice in that they fail to take into account many of the demands of ordinary life and that a relational view of justice grounded upon understanding the differences among social groups offers a better approach, one which acknowledges unjust power relations among individuals, groups, and institutional structures. Young Kim also takes a relational approach to the question of justice, but departs from Iris Marion Young's political advocacy of group rights and instead, he emphasizes the individual and moral aspects of justice. As to its moral aspects, he said that justice includes responsible actions based on rational and autonomous moral agency, with the individual as the proper bearer of rights and responsibilities. Politically, he maintains that the proper context for justice is a form of liberalism with the traditional elements of liberty and equality, together with the concepts of diversity and tolerance.

=== Speed ===
The phrase "Justice delayed is justice denied" refers to the problem of slow justice. The right to speedy trial is in some jurisdictions enshrined. Higher quality justice tends to be speedy.

== Criminal justice ==
In criminal law, a sentence forms the final explicit act of a judge-ruled process, and also the symbolic principal act connected to his function. The sentence can generally involve a decree of imprisonment, a fine and/or other punishments against a defendant convicted of a crime. Laws may specify the range of penalties that can be imposed for various offenses, and sentencing guidelines sometimes regulate what punishment within those ranges can be imposed given a certain set of offense and offender characteristics. The most common purposes of sentencing in legal theory are:

| Theory | Aim of theory | Suitable punishment |
|---|---|---|
| Retribution | Punishment imposed for no reason other than an offense being committed, on the basis that if proportionate, punishment is morally acceptable as a response that satisfies the aggrieved party, their intimates and society. | Tariff sentences; Sentence must be proportionate to the crime |
| Deterrence | To the individual – the individual is deterred through fear of further punishment.; To the general public – Potential offenders warned as to likely punishment | Prison Sentence; Heavy Fine; Long sentence as an example to others |
| Rehabilitation | To reform the offender's behavior | Individualized sentences; Community service orders; Moral education; Vocational education |
| Incapacitation | Offender is made incapable of committing further crime to protect society at large from crime | Long prison sentence; Electronic tagging; Banning orders |
| Reparation | Repayment to victim(s) or to community | Compensation; Unpaid work; Reparation Schemes |
| Denunciation | Society expressing its disapproval reinforcing moral boundaries | Reflects blameworthiness of offense; punishment in public; punishment reported to public |

In civil cases the decision is usually known as a verdict, or judgment, rather than a sentence. Civil cases are settled primarily by means of monetary compensation for harm done ("damages") and orders intended to prevent future harm (for example injunctions). Under some legal systems an award of damages involves some scope for retribution, denunciation and deterrence, by means of additional categories of damages beyond simple compensation, covering a punitive effect, social disapprobation, and potentially, deterrence, and occasionally disgorgement (forfeit of any gain, even if no loss was caused to the other party).

== Evolutionary perspectives ==
Evolutionary ethics and evolution of morality suggest evolutionary bases for the concept of justice. Biosocial criminology research says that human perceptions of what is appropriate criminal justice are based on how to respond to crimes in the ancestral small-group environment and that these responses may not always be appropriate for today's societies.

== Psychology ==
There has been research into victim's perspective of justice following crimes. Victims find respectful treatment, information and having a voice important for a sense of justice as well as the perception of a fair procedure.

Pemberton et al. proposed a "Big 2" model of justice in terms agency, communion and membership in a society. Victims experience a loss of perception of agency due to a loss of control, as well as a loss of communion if the offender is a member of their social group, but may also lose trust in others or institutions. It can shatter an individual's trust that they live in a just and moral world. This suggests that a sense of justice can be restored by increasing a sense of communion and agency, rather than through retribution or restoration.

== Institutions ==
In a world where people are interconnected but they disagree, institutions are required to instantiate ideals of justice. These institutions may be justified by their approximate instantiation of justice, or they may be deeply unjust when compared with ideal standards – consider the institution of slavery. Justice is an ideal the world fails to live up to, sometimes due to deliberate opposition to justice despite understanding, which could be disastrous. The question of institutive justice raises issues of legitimacy, procedure, codification and interpretation, which are considered by legal theorists and by philosophers of law. The United Nations Sustainable Development Goal 16 emphasizes the need for strong institutions in order to uphold justice.

== Different types of justice ==
- Design justice
- Distributive justice
- Environmental justice
- Injustice
- Linguistic Justice
- Occupational injustice
- Open justice
- Organizational justice
- Poetic justice
- Racial justice
- Retributive justice
- Social justice
- Spatial justice
- Transformative justice

== See also ==
- Adl (Arabic for Justice in Islam)
- Crime statistics – Quantitative data on criminal behavior
- Criminal justice – Justice to those who have committed crimes
- Egalitarianism – School of thought favoring equality for all people
- Ethics – Philosophical study of morality
- Global justice – Issue in political philosophy
- International Court of Justice – Judicial organ of the United Nations
- International Criminal Court – International tribunal organisation
- Judicial reform – Political reform of a country's judiciary
- Judicial review – Ability of courts to review actions by executive and legislatures
- Judicial misconduct – Instances when a judge acts unethically
- Just war theory – Doctrine about when a war is ethically just
- Just-world fallacy – Idea that everyone faces consequence as they deserve
- Justice (economics) – Subcategory of welfare economics
- Law – System of enforceable rules
- Law reform – Process of re-examining existing laws
- Morality – Standard, doctrine or system of conduct
- Napoleonic Code – French civil code established in 1804
- Perverting the course of justice – Criminal offence
- Rationality – Quality of being agreeable to reason
- Right to an effective remedy – Right of a person whose human rights have been violated to legal remedy
- Rule according to higher law – Belief that universal principles of morality override unjust laws
- Sociology of law – Sub-discipline of sociology relating to legal studies
