= Edward Clive =

Edward Clive may refer to:

- Edward Clive (died 1845), Member of Parliament (MP)
- Edward Clive (British Army general) (1837–1916), soldier and politician, grandson of the above
- Edward Clive, 1st Earl of Powis (1754–1839), British peer and politician
- Edward Clive, later known as Edward Herbert, 2nd Earl of Powis (1785–1848), peer
- E. E. Clive (1879–1940), British actor
- Edward Clive (judge) (1704–1771), British politician and judge
