= Andrew von Hirsch =

British academic

Andreas von Hirsch, before 2008 published under his anglicised name Andrew von Hirsch, was a legal philosopher and penal theorist and the founding Director of the centre for Penal Theory and Penal Ethics at the Institute of Criminology, Faculty of Law, University of Cambridge. He also has been Honorary Professor of Penal Theory and Penal Law at Cambridge University, and an Honorary Fellow of Wolfson College.

Andreas von Hirsch has also been adjunct professor of penology in the law faculty of the Uppsala University, Sweden. He holds an honorary doctorate of laws from Uppsala University, and an LL.D. from Cambridge University, an AB and an LL.D from Harvard University.

In 2007, von Hirsch was named honorary professor at the law faculty of the University of Frankfurt in Germany. He is founder and director of a new research center on penal theory at Frankfurt, entitled "Forschungsstelle für Strafrechtstheorie und Strafrechtsethik". Since 2018, von Hirsch also holds the honorary title of Emeritus Professor of the Rosario University in Bogotá-Colombia.

Von Hirsch's philosophical theories about penal theory and criminal law have generated an enormous body of independent literature. Von Hirsch has also been recognized by a number of distinguished scholars in, Fundamentals of Sentencing Theory: Essays in Honour of Andreas von Hirsch, (Oxford University Press, 1998), edited by Andrew Ashworth (Vinerian Professor of English Law, University of Oxford) and Martin Wasik (Professor of Criminal Justice, Keele University), also, in “Liberal Criminal Theory: Essays for Andreas von Hirsch”, (Hart Publishing, 2014), edited by Andrew Simester (Edmund-Davies Chair in Criminal Law at King's College London), Antje du Bois-Pedain (University Senior Lecturer at Cambridge University) and Ulfrid Neumann (Professor of Criminal Law and Legal Philosophy at the Goethe University of Frankfurt am Main) and, more recently, in “Penal Censure Engagements. Within and Beyond Desert Theory”, (Hart Publishing, 2019), edited by Antje du Bois-Pedain (Reader in Criminal Law and Philosophy at Cambridge) and Anthony Bottoms (Emeritus Wolfson Professor of Criminology at Cambridge).

== Commensurate Desert ==
Von Hirsch is one of the major contributors to modern retributive theory. Von Hirsch asserts that crimes should be punished proportionately to the seriousness of the crimes committed, this having priority over maximising utilitarian concerns about crime prevention.

== Books and publications ==
- Doing Justice: The Choice of Punishments (1976)
- The Question of Parole (1979)
- Sentencing (co-editor, with Hyman Gross) (1981)
- Past or Future Crimes: Deservedness and Dangerousness in the Sentencing of Criminals (1986)
- The Sentencing Commission and its Guidelines (with Kay Knapp and Michael Tonry) (1987)
- Strafmaß und Strafgerechtigkeit (1991)
- Censure and Sanctions (1993)
- Principled Sentencing (co-edited, with Andrew Ashworth) (1998)
- Criminal Deterrence and Sentence Severity (with Anthony Bottoms, et al.) (1999)
- Ethical and Social Perspectives on Situational Crime Prevention (co-edited, with David Garland and Alison Wakefield) (2000)
- Proportionalitet och Strafbestämning (2001)
- Restorative Justice and Criminal Justice: Competing or Reconcilable Paradigms? (co-edited, with Anthony Bottoms and Julian Roberts) (2003)
- Die Rechtsgutstheorie (co-editor) (2003)
- Tatproportionalität (co-editor)(2003)
- Proportionate Sentencing: Exploring the Principles (with Andrew Ashworth) (2005)
- Fairness, Verbrechen und Strafe: Strafrechtstheoretische Abhandlungen (2005)
- Mediating Principles: Begrenzungsprinzipien bei der Strafbegründung (co-editor) (2006)
- Incivilities: Regulating Offensive Behaviour (co-edited with Andrew Simester) (2006)
- Previous Convictions at Sentencing (co-edited with Julian Roberts) (2010)
- Paternalismus im Strafrecht (co-edited with Ulfrid Neumann and Kurt Seelmann) (2010)
- Crimes, Harms, and Wrongs: On the Principles of Criminalisation (with Andrew Simister) (2011)
- Strafe - Warum? Gegenwärtige Strafbegründungen im Lichte von Hegels Straftheorie (co-edited with Ulfrid Neumann and Kurt Seelmann) (2011)
- Deserved Criminal Sentences (2017)
