= A Discourse on the Study of the Law =

Georgian-era English-law treatise by Blackstone

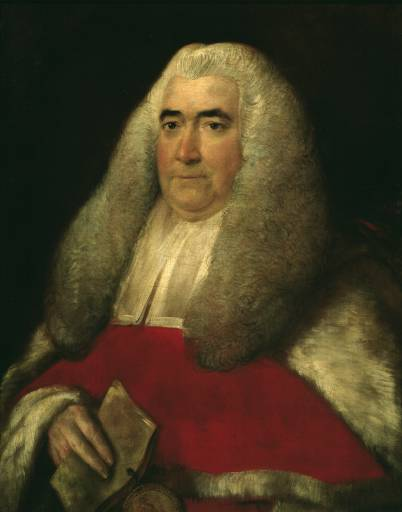
Sir William Blackstone, author of the Discourse.

A Discourse on the Study of the Law is a treatise by Sir William Blackstone first published in 1758. On 20 October 1758 Blackstone had been confirmed as the first Vinerian Professor of English Law, and immediately gave a lecture on 24 October, which was reprinted as the Discourse.

== Training of gentlemen ==
The Discourse was designed to be a work on how to study English law, and the importance of doing so. Blackstone emphasised the advantages of a civilian legal education over the training for a call to the Bar, arguing for the inherent dignity of study at a university. He was particularly alarmed by the growing practice of sending a potential lawyer to work in an attorney's office, saying that:

for (as few persons of birth, or fortune, or even of scholastic education, will submit to the drudgery or servitude and the manual labour of copying the trash of an office) should this infatuation prevail to any considerable degree, we must rarely expect to see a gentleman of distinction or learning at the bar. And what the consequence may be, to have the interpretation and enforcement of the laws (which include the entire disposal of our properties, liberties, and lives) fall wholly into the hands of obscure or illiterate men, is a matter of very public concern.

In Continental Europe and Scotland, the academic study of the law was regarded as a required part of a gentleman's training, but it was not in England; the aristocracy "have been more remarkably deficient than those of all Europe". This was because the "stylistic barbarisms and crafty practitioners" were seen as below the aristocracy, and not conforming to gentleman-like sensibilities.

== Criticism of Roman and Byzantine legislation ==
Blackstone also emphasised the need for gentlemen to study not only the law, but English law, to secure the continuation of the British tradition of civil liberties, arguing that "[W]e must not carry our veneration [of the civil law] so far as to sacrifice our Alfred and Edward to the manes of Theodosius and Justinian, we must not prefer the edict of the praetor, or the rescript of the roman emperor, to our own immemorial customs, or the sanctions of an english parliament; unless we can also prefer the despotic monarchy of Rome and Byzantium, for whose meridians the former were calculated, to the free constitution of Britain, which the latter are adapted to perpetuate".

== Sales and reprints ==
Described as a "sensible, spirited and manly exhortation to the study of the law", the initial print run of the Discourse sold out, necessitating the publication of another 1,000 copies. Later versions of his An Analysis of the Laws of England and the first volume of his Commentaries on the Laws of England were prefaced with copies. Paul Lucas, writing in the English Historical Review, notes that unlike his other works, Blackstone's Discourse survived its various editions with no modifications whatsoever, showing that he considered it "a key statement of his opinions".

== Bibliography ==
- Lucas, Paul (1962). "Blackstone and the Reform of the Legal Profession". English Historical Review. 77 (304). Oxford University Press. ISSN 0013-8266.
- Prest, Wilfrid (2008). William Blackstone: Law and Letters in the Eighteenth Century. Oxford University Press. ISBN 978-0-19-955029-6.
- Sheppard, Steve (2007). The history of legal education in the United States: commentaries and primary sources. The Lawbook Exchange, Ltd. ISBN 978-1-58477-690-1.
