= Harold Hanbury =

British academic and jurist (1898–1993)

Harold Greville Hanbury (19 June 1898 at Compton Verney House, Warwickshire – 12 March 1993 at Pinetown, Natal, South Africa) was Vinerian Professor of English Law at the University of Oxford from 1949 to 1964.

== Biography ==
He was the only child of Basil Hanbury and his wife, Patience, née Verney, a daughter of Henry Verney, eighteenth Baron Willoughby de Broke.

He was educated at Charterhouse and took up a Classical Scholarship at Brasenose College, Oxford, in 1915, but interrupted his studies for military service in the British Army in 1916, returning to complete his degree after the end of World War I. In 1921 he was elected a Fellow of Lincoln College, and an Honorary Fellow in 1949.

In that year he was appointed Vinerian Professor of English Law, which carried with it a Fellowship at All Souls College. He remained there until his retirement in 1964, after which he was Dean of the Law Faculty of the University of Nigeria until 1966. He was afterwards a champion of the Biafran cause, and published in 1968 "Biafra: A Challenge to the Conscience of Britain".

In 1980 Margaret, Hanbury's wife, whom he had married in 1927 (a niece of the Danish pathologist Georges Dreyer), died, and he left England to live with a god-daughter in Natal, South Africa, where he died in 1993 aged 94

Hanbury was a highly regarded figure in the Oxford of his day, on account of his accessible lecturing style and affable personality, and immensely popular with his undergraduates. He was also known for his great fondness for cats, and for years was the vice-president of the Oxford Cat Club.

== Works ==
His publications were not numerous, but included "Modern Equity", first published in 1935, which continues to be published as Hanbury and Martin: Modern Equity having been authored for many editions by Professor Jill E. Martin (the book is now in its 21st edition, 2018, by James Glister and James Lee). Hanbury was a follower of Sir William Holdsworth, England's leading academic lawyer between the wars, and as his literary executor collaborated in the editing and publication of the last four volumes of Holdsworth's "History of English Law" (1952–66).

== Sources ==
- Oxford DNB
- Who Was Who

Academic offices
Preceded by Geoffrey Cheshire	Vinerian Professor of English Law; 1949–1964	Succeeded by Rupert Cross
