= Guenter Treitel =

German-born English legal academic (1928–2019)

Sir Guenter Heinz Treitel QC FBA
- Born: 26 October 1928; Berlin, Germany
- Died: 14 June 2019 (aged 90); England
- Occupation: Academic
- Known for: Vinerian Professor of English Law
- Spouse: Phyllis Cook (1957)
- Children: 2 sons: Richard & Henry
- Awards: Fellow of the British Academy (1977)

Academic background
- Education: Kilburn Grammar School
- Alma mater: Magdalen College, Oxford

Academic work
- Discipline: Law
- Sub-discipline: Law of contract English contract law
- Institutions: Magdalen College, Oxford; All Souls College, Oxford
- Notable works: Treitel on the Law of Contract

Sir Guenter Heinz Treitel QC FBA (26 October 1928 – 14 June 2019) was a German-born English academic and Vinerian Professor of English Law.

Treitel was born in Berlin into a Jewish family, the son of a prominent lawyer, Theodor Treitel, and his wife, Hannah Lilly Levy. In March 1939, he came to England on the Kindertransport together with his older brother, Kurt Max Treitel, and sister Celia. Treitel was once described by Lord Steyn as "one of the most distinguished academic writers on the law of contract in the English speaking world", and has often been described as the leading authority on English contract law. He was the author of Treitel on the Law of Contract, a seminal work on English contract law.

He was elected as a Fellow of the British Academy in 1977. In 1983, he became a Trustee of the British Museum and in 1984 became a Member of the Council of the National Trust.

Treitel retired as Vinerian Professor in 1997 and received a knighthood for services to law. Treitel had been a Fellow of All Souls College, Oxford since 1979; he was previously a Fellow of Magdalen College from 1954 to 1979.

Academic offices
Preceded by Rupert Cross	Vinerian Professor of English Law; 1979—1997	Succeeded by Andrew Ashworth
