= John Heath (judge) =

John Heath (1736–1816) was a judge chiefly in criminal trials, in which he earned a reputation for severe sentencing. He was a resident of Hayes, Middlesex, where a road is named after him, Judge Heath Lane.

== Early years ==
Born in Exeter to a family of merchants and fullers, Heath attended London's Westminster School from 1748 until 1754, when he went up to Christ Church, Oxford, graduating B.A. in 1758 and M.A. in 1762.

== Career and reputation ==
Admitted to the Inner Temple in May 1759, Heath was called to the Bar in 1762. He became a judge in 1779, and in 1780 he succeeded Sir William Blackstone as a Justice of the Common Pleas.

Heath refused the knighthood that was customary to the office. Cost may have been a factor in his refusal, but it was also in keeping with the reputation he acquired. He was "plain John Heath" - no-nonsense - in speech and in person. Heath possessed great legal and general knowledge, and he paid scrupulous attention to evidence and argument. Once he formed an opinion, he was not easily persuaded to depart from it.

Heath became chiefly known as a judge in criminal trials. He held the view that "there is no regeneration for felons in this life, and for their own sake, as well as for the sake of society, I think it is better to hang". He applied this way of thinking consistently, earning a lasting reputation for severe sentencing. In his private life, however, Heath was reputedly good natured and kind.

A folk-etymology developed in the area, that the village of Heathrow (where the airport is now) was named after him; but the village's name is recorded from long before his time.

== Death ==
Heath continued working up to his death, regularly riding out to court from his home in Hayes, Middlesex. He had been on the bench for more than thirty-five years when he died of apoplexy on 16 January 1816. He is buried in Hayes parish church. Heath did not marry, and the sister with whom he lived for many years predeceased him.

== External sources ==
- W. R. Drake, Heathiana: notes, genealogical and biographical, of the family of Heath (1881)
- P. Polden, entry in the Oxford Dictionary of National Biography
