= Philip Williams (legal scholar) =

English lawyer and academic

Philip Williams (1780–1843) was an English lawyer and academic in the University of Oxford.

Williams was born in Winchester in 1780. He was the son of the Rev. Philip Williams of Winchester. On 24 April 1798 he matriculated at New College, Oxford, of which he was also a Fellow until 1818. He was awarded his BCL in 1805 and his DCL in 1825. In 1824 he was appointed Vinerian Professor of English Law, which he remained until his death in 1843. At this period Oxford University was in a prolonged decline: the demands on the post were few, and there are no records of Williams' work.

In 1806 he was called to the bar at Lincoln's Inn, where he became a KC and a bencher in 1831. He also served as Recorder of Winchester.

He married Jane Blachford; her grandfather was Sir Fitzwilliam Barrington, 8th Baronet. His daughter Sarah Jane Williams married her second cousin Charles Simeon, who also had Sir Fitzwilliam Barrington, 10th Baronet as his grandfather. Simeon was later a member of the Canterbury Association. For some years, she lived with her husband in Christchurch, New Zealand.

== Notes ==
Academic offices
| Preceded by James Blackstone | Vinerian Professor of English Law; 1824—1843 | Succeeded by John Robert Kenyon |
