= St Peter's Church, Wallingford =

Coordinates: 51.6007°N 1.1217°W

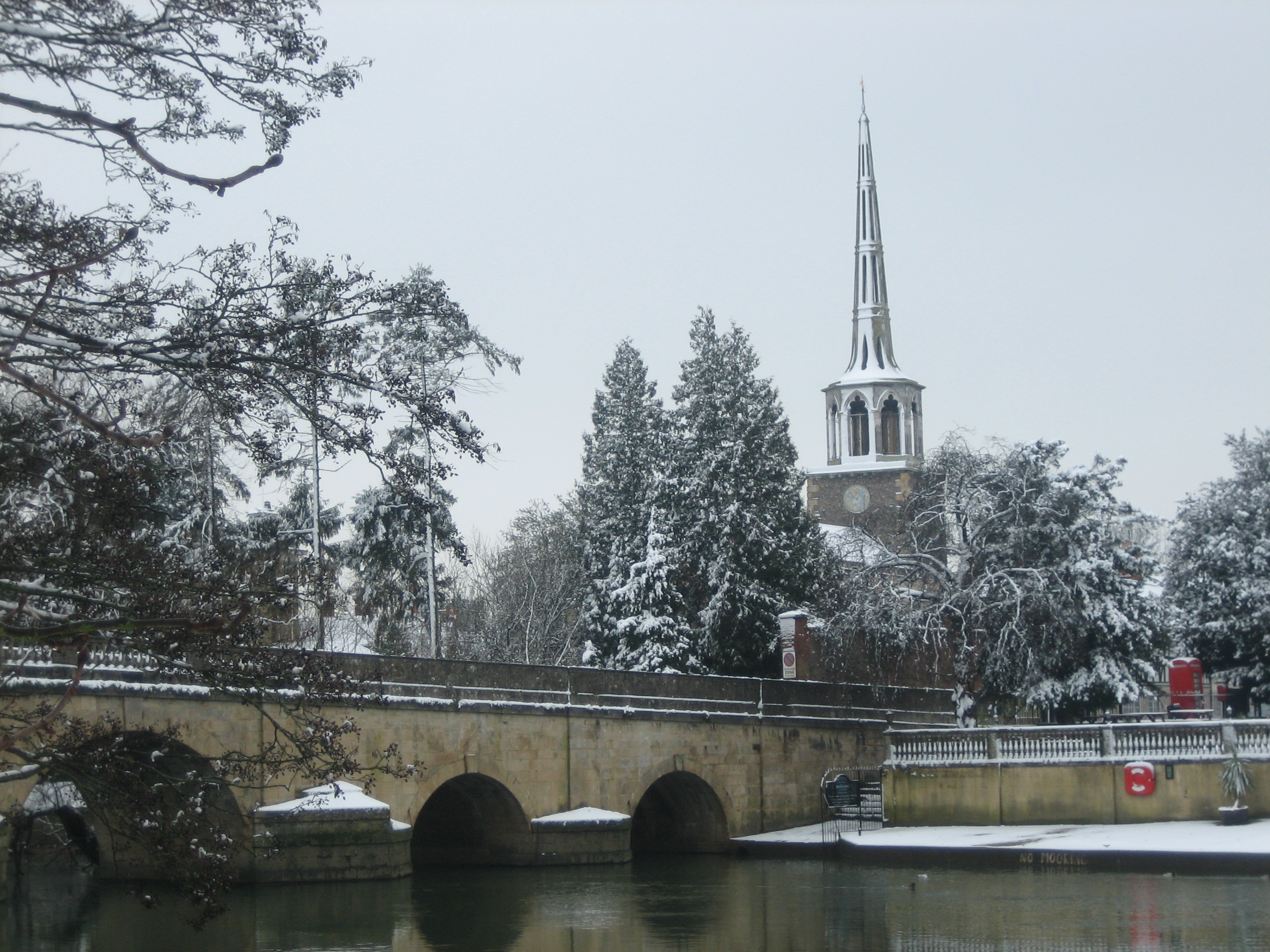
- St Peter's Church, Wallingford, from the northeast

- Location in Oxfordshire
- OS grid reference: SU 609 895
- Location: Wallingford, Oxfordshire
- Country: England
- Denomination: Anglican
- Website: Churches Conservation Trust

History
- Founded: 1773
- Dedication: Saint Peter

Architecture
- Heritage designation: Grade II*
- Designated: 9 December 1949
- Architect: Sir Robert Taylor (spire)
- Architectural type: Church
- Style: Neoclassical, Gothic Revival
- Groundbreaking: 1763
- Completed: 1904

Specifications
- Materials: Stone and flint Roofs slated and tiled

St Peter's Church is a redundant Anglican church in Wallingford, Oxfordshire, England. It is recorded in the National Heritage List for England as a designated Grade II* listed building, and is under the care of the Churches Conservation Trust. The church stands at the east side of the town, overlooking the River Thames.

== History ==
An earlier church on the site was destroyed in 1646 during the siege of Wallingford in the Civil War. Building of the present church started in 1763, the contractors being William Toovey and Joseph Tuckwell. In 1767 the interior of the church was paved, pews were added, and the exterior was stuccoed under the supervision of Sir Robert Taylor. A spire designed by Taylor was added in 1776–77. A local resident, Sir William Blackstone, a lawyer and author of the Commentaries on the Laws of England, took an interest in the building of the spire and paid for the clock face visible from his house. He is now buried in the family vault beneath the church.

The chancel was built in 1904, designed by Sidney Roberts Stevenson. The church was declared redundant on 1 May 1971, and was vested in the Churches Conservation Trust on 26 July 1972. For visitor access, a key can be obtained from the nearby Tourist Information Office. A series of chamber music concerts is held during the summer months.

== Architecture ==
=== Exterior ===
The plan of the church consists of a four-bay nave, a chancel with an apse, and a west tower with a spire. The nave and chancel are constructed in ashlar stone, the nave standing on a flint plinth. The tower is built in knapped flint, with stone quoins and bands. The nave is roofed in Welsh slate and the chancel is tiled. At the top of the tower is a clock face on each side, except the north. Above this is an octagonal belfry surmounted by an openwork stone spire. The nave and tower are in Neoclassical style, and the chancel is Gothic Revival. The church is entered by a double door in a round-headed doorway on the west side of the tower. Above the doorway is a three-light window containing Y-tracery. The nave has a shaped cornice and a plain parapet, and contains four round-headed windows on each side. In the chancel are windows dating from the 20th century, the one on the north side being a rose window.

=== Interior ===
The nave has a shallow-arched coffered ceiling. The pews and font date from the 18th century. In the east window is stained glass dating from 1918 by Morris & Co. On the south wall is a monument to Sir William Blackstone and his family. It consists of an inscribed panel above three shields, surrounded by an arch.

== See also ==
- List of churches preserved by the Churches Conservation Trust in South East England
