= Rupert Cross =

English legal scholar

Sir Alfred Rupert Neale Cross QC FBA (15 June 1912 in Chelsea, London – 12 September 1980, Oxford) was an English legal scholar. He was the second of two sons of Arthur George Cross, an architect in Hastings, and Mary Elizabeth (née Dalton).

== Biography ==
He was born with cancer of the eyes and was completely blind after an operation at the age of 1. Worcester College for the Blind provided his education before he went to Worcester College, Oxford in 1930 where he took a Second in Modern History in 1933.

Cross remained at Oxford to read for a second school, that of Jurisprudence. He received great help and encouragement from Theo Tyler, Fellow and Tutor in Law at Balliol College, Oxford. Tyler himself was nearly blind. Under his stimulus and rigour, Cross gained a First in Jurisprudence in 1935. '[H]ad he not been overstanding for honours he would have obtained a First in BCL, which he took in 1937', according to H. L. A. Hart. He was awarded the degree of D.C.L. in 1958.

Cross became a solicitor in 1939 and was a tutor, Law Society, from 1945 to 1948. From 1948 to 1964 he was a Fellow of Magdalen College, Oxford. He held a Visiting Professorship in the University of Adelaide, Australia, 1962, and in the University of Sydney, 1968. On the retirement of Harold Hanbury, Cross was elected Vinerian Professor of English Law in the University of Oxford, a position he held from 1964 to 1979. The Vinerian Professorship carried a Fellowship at All Souls College. He was a Fellow of the British Academy from 1967 and received a knighthood in 1973.

In 1937 he married Aline Heather Chadwick, the daughter of a Leeds solicitor; they had no children.

As an undergraduate Cross represented Oxford University four times (1931–34) on the top board in the prestigious annual Varsity chess match against Cambridge University. He played several times in the top section of the British Chess Championship in the 1930s (for which only an elite group of twelve players qualified).

Cross's elder brother, Geoffrey, also became a lawyer and achieved distinction. He was a Prize Fellow at Trinity College, Cambridge, and became in succession a Judge of the Chancery Division, a Lord Justice of Appeal, and a Lord Appeal in Ordinary.

== Works ==
His best-known work is probably Cross on Evidence, first published in 1959. In 1976 Cross published Statutory Interpretation. This book has been sufficiently well regarded that two posthumous editions have been produced, under the editorship of John Bell and George Engle. In recognition of Cross's great prestige, his name has remained in the predominant spot on the title page.

Academic offices
Preceded by Harold Hanbury	Vinerian Professor of English Law; 1964–1979	Succeeded by Guenter Treitel
