= John Robert Kenyon =

British legal scholar (1807–1880)

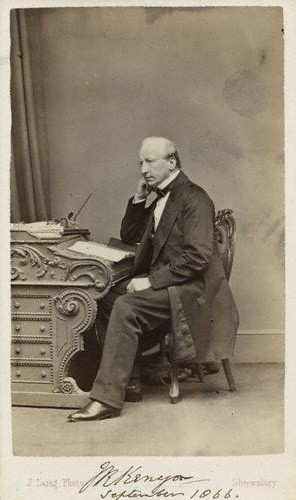
John Robert Kenyon.

John Robert Kenyon QC (13 January 1807 – 17 April 1880) was a British lawyer and academic. A Fellow of All Souls College, Oxford, from 1828, he served as Vinerian Professor of English Law at the University of Oxford from 1844 until his death.

== Biography ==
He was born the first son of Thomas Kenyon (the son of Lloyd Kenyon, 1st Baron Kenyon) and Louisa Charlotte Lloyd of Pradoe, Shropshire. He attended Charterhouse School (1819) and then matriculated at Christ Church, Oxford, on 24 January 1825, aged 18. He was awarded his Bachelor of Arts (BA) degree in 1828, and in the same year was elected a Fellow of All Souls College, Oxford. He gained a Bachelor of Civil Law (BCL) degree in 1831 and Doctor of Civil Law (DCL) degree in 1836. He was called to the bar at the Middle Temple in 1835, and became a bencher in 1862. In 1844 he succeeded Philip Williams as Vinerian Professor of English Law, and held the chair until his death. He was also Queen's Counsel (QC), Recorder of Oswestry from 1842 and Deputy-Chairman from 1855 then from 1871 Chairman of the Shropshire Quarter Sessions.

In 1867 he succeeded his parents in the ownership of the Pradoe estate and died of bronchitis on 17 April 1880 aged 73 in Pradoe, the place of his birth.

John Robert Kenyon married Mary Eliza, daughter of Edward Hawkins, Keeper of Antiquities at the British Museum, and was the father of Sir Frederic Kenyon and the grandfather of Dame Kathleen Kenyon.

== Sources ==
- Foster, Joseph, "Alumni Oxonienses"
- Hanbury, H.G., 1958. "Vinerian Professors and Legal Education." Oxford: OUP.

Academic offices
Preceded by Philip Williams	Vinerian Professor of English Law; 1844—1880	Succeeded by A. V. Dicey
