= An Analysis of the Laws of England =

Legal treatise by British legal professor William Blackstone

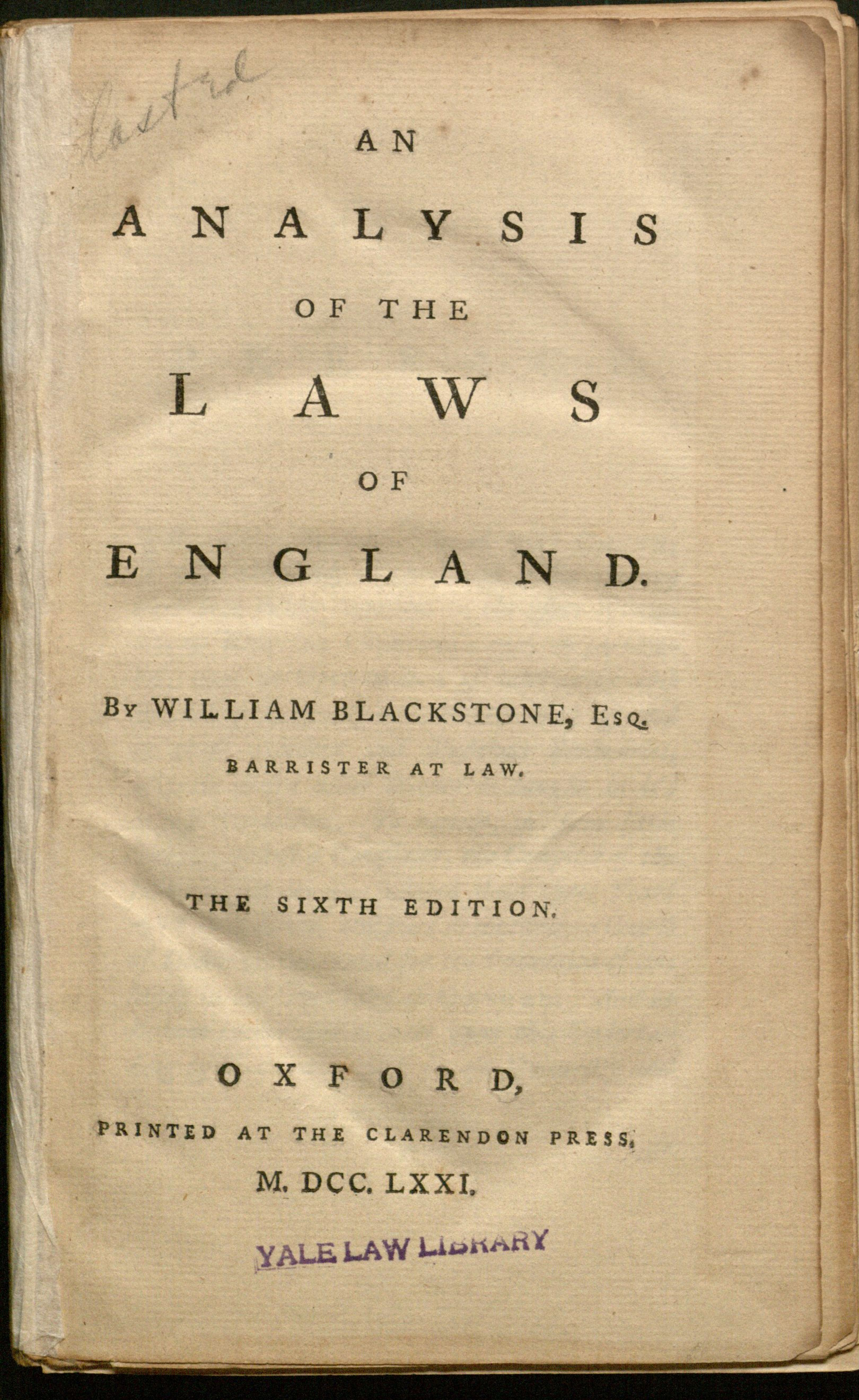

An Analysis of the Laws of England is a legal treatise by British legal professor William Blackstone. It was first published by the Clarendon Press in 1756. A Fellow of All Souls College, Oxford, and a lecturer there, on 3 July 1753 Blackstone announced his intentions to give a set of lectures on the common law — the first lectures of that sort in the world. A prospectus was issued on 23 June 1753, and with a class of approximately 20 students, the first lecture series was completed by July 1754. Despite Blackstone's limited oratory skills and a speaking style described by Jeremy Bentham as "formal, precise and affected", Blackstone's lectures were warmly appreciated. The second and third series were far more popular, partially due to his then unusual use of printed handouts and lists of suggested reading. These show Blackstone's attempts to reduce English law to a logical system, with the division of subjects later being the basis for his Commentaries. The lecture series brought him £116, £226 and £111 a year respectively from 1753 to 1755 — a total of £94,000 in 2025 terms. Seeing the success of this publication, Blackstone was induced to write An Analysis of the Laws of England, a 200-page introduction to English law, which was first published in 1756 by the Clarendon Press.

Analysis begins with a summary of the ways that English law had been subdivided until that time. Blackstone examined the methods of Ranulf de Glanvill, Henry de Bracton and Matthew Hale, concluding that Hale's method was superior to the others. As such, Hale's distribution "hath therefore been principally followed" [by Blackstone in An Analysis . . ], albeit with some amendments. The treatise is "a marked advance on any previous introduction to English law . . including constitutional, civil and criminal law, public and private law, substantive law and procedure, as well as some introductory jurisprudential content". The initial print run of 1,000 copies almost immediately sold out, leading to the printing of three additional 1,000-book lots over the next three years, which also sold out. A fifth edition was published in 1762, and a sixth, edited to take into account Blackstone's Commentaries on the Laws of England, in 1771. Many of the later editions were prefaced with copies of Blackstone's A Discourse on the Study of the Law, first published in 1758. Because of the success of the Commentaries, Prest remarks that "relatively little scholarly attention has been paid to this work"; at the time, however, it was hailed as "an elegant performance...calculated to facilitate this branch of knowledge".

== Bibliography ==
- Cairns, J. (1984). "Blackstone, An English Institutist: Legal Literature and the Rise of the Nation State". Oxford Journal of Legal Studies. 4 (1). Oxford University Press: 318–360. doi:10.1093/ojls/4.3.318. ISSN 0143-6503.
- Finnis, J.M. (1967). "Blackstone's Theoretical Intentions". Natural Law Forum. 12 (1). University of Notre Dame Law School. ISSN 0199-9702.
- Holdsworth, W.S. (1932). "Some Aspects of Blackstone and His Commentaries". Cambridge Law Journal. 4 (3). Cambridge University Press: 261–285. doi:10.1017/S0008197300131927. ISSN 0008-1973. S2CID 144719136.
- Prest, Wilfrid (2008). William Blackstone: Law and Letters in the Eighteenth Century. Oxford University Press. ISBN 978-0-19-955029-6.
