= Edward Clive (judge) =

British politician and judge

Sir Edward Clive (1704 – 16 April 1771) was a British politician and judge.

The eldest son of Edward Clive of Wormbridge, Herefordshire, and his wife Sarah, daughter of Mr Key, a Bristol merchant, Clive was born in 1704. He was admitted to Lincoln's Inn on 27 March 1719 and called to the bar in 1725. In 1741, he was returned to Parliament for the constituency of St. Michael's, although there is no record of him making any speeches while an MP. In 1745 he was made a Serjeant-at-Law and appointed a Baron of the Exchequer. In January 1753, after the death of Sir Thomas Burnet, Clive was transferred to the Court of Common Pleas, and on 9 February, knighted. He retired in February 1770 with a pension of £1,200 a year and was succeeded by Sir William Blackstone. Clive died in Bath on 16 April 1771.

He was first married to Elizabeth, the daughter of Richard Symons of Mynde Park, Herefordshire, and then to Judith, the youngest daughter of his cousin, the Rev. Benjamin Clive, who died in Wormbridge, Treville, Herefordshire, on 20 August 1796. As he had no children by either marriage, he left the Wormbridge estate to the great-grandson of his eldest uncle, Robert Clive.

Parliament of Great Britain
| Preceded by Thomas Watts; Robert Ord | Member of Parliament for Mitchell; 1741 – 1745; With: John Ord | Succeeded by Richard Lloyd; John Ord |
Legal offices
| Preceded by Laurence Carter | Baron of the Exchequer; 1745–1753 | Unknown |
| Preceded by Thomas Burnet | Justice of the Common Pleas; 1753–1770 | Succeeded by Sir William Blackstone |
