= Andrew Ashworth =

British academic

Dr. Andrew Ashworth CBE KC (Hon) FBA
- Born: 11 October 1947 (age 78)

Academic background
- Education: London School of Economics; University of Oxford; University of Manchester

Academic work
- Discipline: English Law
- Sub-discipline: Civil law

Andrew John Ashworth, CBE, KC (Hon), FBA (born 11 October 1947) was the Vinerian Professor of English Law at the University of Oxford from 1997 to 2013, a Fellow of All Souls College, and was formerly Chairman of the Sentencing Advisory Panel before it was abolished in 2010. He gained his LLB in 1968 from the London School of Economics, a BCL from Oxford in 1970, and a PhD in 1973 from the University of Manchester. He attended Rishworth School in West Yorkshire.

Ashworth was appointed Commander of the Order of the British Empire (CBE) in the 2009 Birthday Honours.

== Publishing ==
He has written extensively on English criminal law, and was for several years the Editor of the Criminal Law Review.

== Teaching ==
Ashworth teaches courses on the Bachelor of Civil Law course. He has also supervised research students on Oxford's various legal research courses.

== Views ==
Ashworth through his works has shown much resentment towards the approach of the British Parliament to basic principles of criminal justice. He advocates respect for the presumption of innocence and has written a considerable number of articles on different areas of law of evidence.

Academic offices
Preceded by Guenter Treitel	Vinerian Professor of English Law; 1997—2013	Succeeded by Hugh Collins
