= Joseph Yates (judge) =

English judge

Sir Joseph Yates (1722–June 7, 1770) of Peel Hall, Little Hulton, Lancashire, was an English judge.

== Biography ==
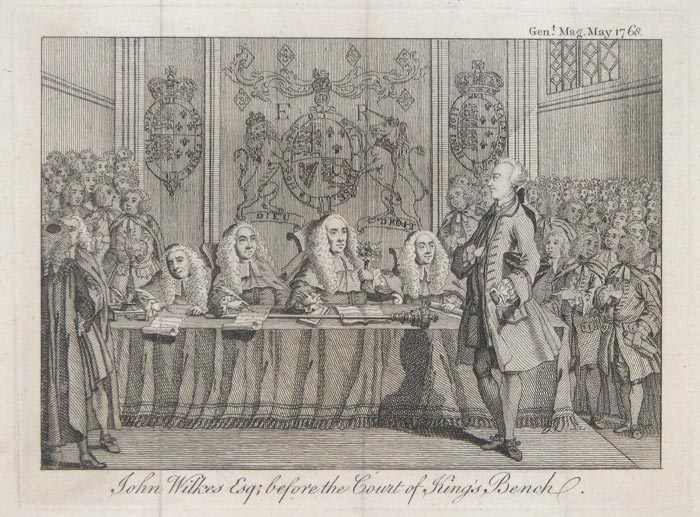
John Wilkes before the King's Bench, 1768

He was born in Manchester, the son of Joseph Yates, barrister, of Stanley House, Lancashire, and educated at Manchester Grammar School and The Queen's College, Oxford. He studied law at Staple Inn and the Inner Temple and was called to the bar in 1753.

In 1761, he was appointed King's Council for the Duchy of Lancaster. He was knighted in 1763 and appointed early the following year to the King's Bench, in the same year becoming the Chancellor of Durham. During his time on the King's Bench, he adjudicated at the famous trial of John Wilkes who was charged with sedition and obscenity, sentencing him to two years in jail. He later transferred, in 1770, from the King's Bench to the Court of Common Pleas, holding the latter appointment little more than a month before he died.

He was buried at Cheam, in Surrey, where there is a monument to his memory.

He had married Elizabeth Baldwyn, the daughter of Charles Baldwyn of Munslow, Shropshire. They had one son, Joseph, and a daughter, Charlotte Elizabeth (d.1845), who married Cholmeley Dering (1766-1836) in 1789. Descendants include Walter Baldwyn Yates C.B.E., Rt Hon Jeremy Hunt MP, Her Majesty's Principal Secretary of State for Foreign and Commonwealth Affairs and the novelist Edward Heneage Dering.

== Monument inscription ==
"Sacred to the Memory
of the Honorable
Sir Joseph Yates, Knight,
of Peel Hall in Lancashire,
successively a Judge of the Courts
of King's Bench and Common Pleas;
whose merit advanced him to the
feat of Justice, which he filled with the most
distinguished abilities and invincible integrity.
He died the 7th day of June 1770,
in the 48th year of his age,
leaving the world to lament the loss
of an honest Man and able Judge,
firm to assert
and strenuous to support
the laws and constitution
of his Country."

== Famous cases ==
- Millar v Taylor

== On privacy ==
In one of his opinions, Justice Yates once wrote, "It is certain that every man has a right to keep his own sentiments, if he pleases; he has certainly a right to judge whether he will make them public or commit them only to the sight of his own friends. In that state the manuscript is, in every sense, his peculiar property, and no man can take it from him or make any use of it that he has not authorised without being guilty of a violation of his property."
