= Vinerian Professor of English Law =

Position at the University of Oxford

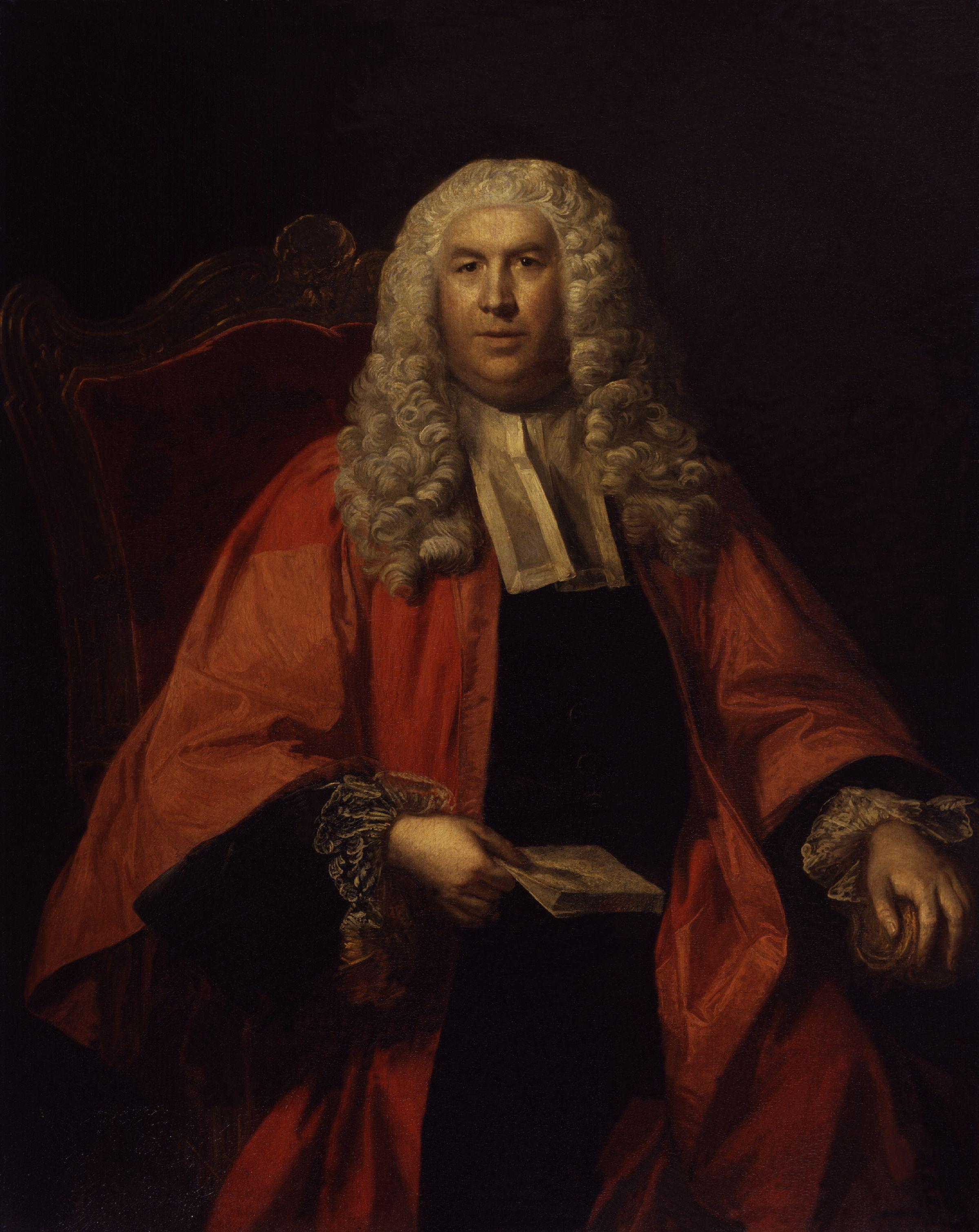
Sir William Blackstone, first Vinerian Professor

The Vinerian Professorship of English Law, formerly Vinerian Professorship of Common Law, was established by Charles Viner, who by his will, dated 29 December 1755, left about £12,000 to the chancellor, masters and scholars of the University of Oxford, to establish a professorship of the common law in that university, as well as a number of Vinerian scholarships and readerships.

Until the establishment of the Vinerian Chair, only canon law and Roman (civil) law had been taught at Oxford and Cambridge. Only the Inns of Court provided any instruction in the common law, which was of most practical use to practitioners. Upon Sir William Blackstone's appointment to the Vinerian Professorship, his lectures were the first to be given on English Common Law at any university.

== Holders ==
The holders of the chair since its foundation are:

1. 1758–1766 Sir William Blackstone (lived from 1723–1780)
2. 1767–1777 Sir Robert Chambers (1737–1803)
3. 1777–1793 Richard Wooddeson (1745–1822)
4. 1793–1824 James Blackstone (1765–1831) (son of William Blackstone above)
5. 1824–1843 Philip Williams (1780–1843)
6. 1844–1880 John Robert Kenyon (1807–1880)
7. 1882–1909 Albert Venn Dicey (1835–1922)
8. 1909–1922 William Martin Geldart (1870–1922)
9. 1922–1944 William Searle Holdsworth (1871–1944)
10. 1944–1949 Geoffrey Chevalier Cheshire (1886–1978)
11. 1949–1964 Harold Greville Hanbury (1898–1993)
12. 1964–1979 Rupert (A.R.N.) Cross (1912–1980)
13. 1979–1996 Guenter Treitel (1928–2019)
14. 1997–2012 Andrew Ashworth (b. 1947)
15. 2013–2020 Hugh Collins (b. 1953)
16. 2020–present Timothy Endicott (b. 1960)

== See also ==
- List of professorships at the University of Oxford
