= William Searle Holdsworth =

English historian (1871–1944)

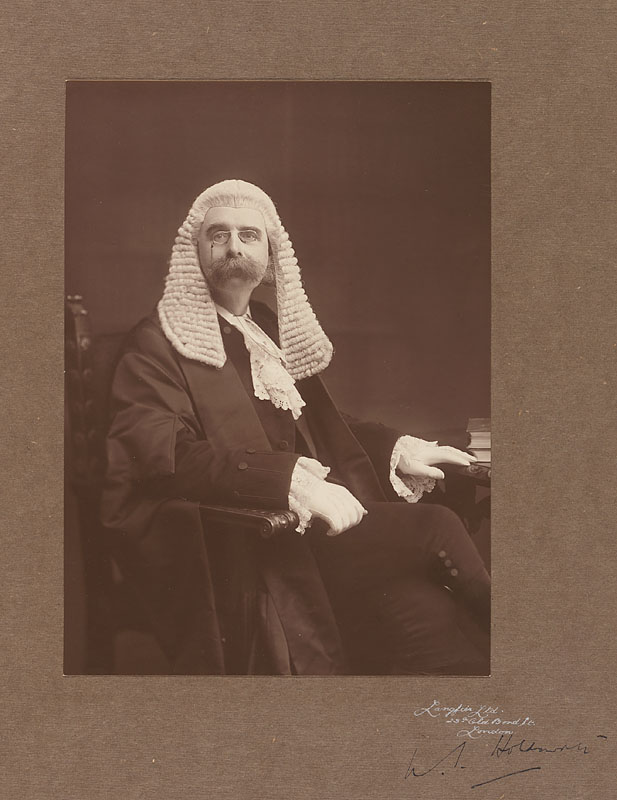
Sir William Searle Holdsworth

Sir William Searle Holdsworth OM KC FBA (7 May 1871 – 2 January 1944) was an English legal historian and Vinerian Professor of English Law at Oxford University, amongst whose works is the 17-volume History of English Law.

== Biography ==
Holdsworth was born in Beckenham, Kent in 1871, the son of a well-known London solicitor, Charles Joseph Holdsworth and his wife Ellen Caroline (née Searle). He was educated at Dulwich College and in 1890 went on to win a History Exhibition from Dulwich College to New College, Oxford. He took first-class honours both in History and in Law, and second class honours in the BCL. He was called to the bar at Lincoln's Inn in 1896.

Holdsworth's main work, with a first edition of the first book in 1903, was A History of English Law, gradually expanded to cover everything from Ancient Britain to 1875 over his career. Holdsworth became Professor of Constitutional Law at University College, London (1903 to 1908). In 1922, he became the Vinerian Professor of English Law at Oxford. In Charles Dickens as a Legal Historian (1928, repr. 1972), a book version of Holdsworth's Storrs Lectures at Yale Law School, he argued that historians should pay closer attention to the novels of Charles Dickens as source material about the workings of English law and legal institutions; it contains a thoughtful and sensitive analysis of Dickens's novel Bleak House as an illuminating examination of the Chancery system. In Some Makers of English Law (Cambridge University Press, 1938), reprinting the Tagore Lectures delivered in 1937–1938 at Calcutta University, Holdsworth offered an overview of the history of English law through biographical studies of key figures in that history. Holdsworth was knighted in 1929 for his work with the colonial Indian States Enquiry Committee, and was appointed as a member of the Order of Merit in 1943. He died in 1944. There are portraits of Sir William Holdsworth by Bassano in the National Portrait Gallery, and his portrait in pastels by E. Plachter can be seen in the Holdsworth Room of St John's College, Oxford.

== A History of English Law ==
A History of English Law, Holdsworth's greatest literary academic achievement, and eventually comprising 17 volumes, was published between 1903 and 1966, although Holdsworth himself only completed volumes 1 to 12 during his lifetime. Volumes 13 to 16 were posthumously edited by A. L. Goodhart and H. G. Hanbury, and volume 17, the index, was completed by John Burke. The work begins with Anglo-Saxon times, and it is an account of legal procedure and court organisation down to the Judicature Acts of 1875 and of the important phases of substantive law through the 18th century. The introductory volume 1 was frequently used as a textbook, and went through seven editions to 1956.

Modern legal historians have criticized Holdsworth for his reliance on secondary sources, as compared to the extensive original research that Frederic William Maitland conducted for his History of English Law before the Time of Edward I. When historian Stanley Bertram Chrimes prepared the seventh edition of Holdsworth's first volume in 1956, Chrimes had to begin with a 77-page introduction updating Holdsworth's conclusions, and those caveats have themselves become outdated.

== Societies ==
=== Holdsworth Club ===
The Holdsworth Club is the University of Birmingham Law School's student law society. The Holdsworth Club was founded in 1927 and named after Sir William Holdsworth, by Professor C.E. Smalley-Baker who served as the first Dean of the University of Birmingham's Faculty of Law between 1928 and 1949. Sir William Holdsworth was Smalley-Baker's mentor and had been an External Examiner at the University for several years.

After giving his name to the Law Faculty's Student Club (the names of Bacon, Coke and Blackstone having been considered and rejected); Sir William Holdsworth became its active Patron. In this role he attended and spoke at the Club's annual dinner, and he gave an annual presidential address. The establishment of the presidency of the Holdsworth Club as an annual office, involving the sole obligations of attending a dinner and giving a lecture, led to the Faculty gaining a distinguished line of visiting speakers, (which by 1948 already included two Lord Chancellors and two Masters of the Rolls).

Sir William Holdsworth remained patron of the club until his death in 1944 (after which there have been two more patrons: Dean Smalley-Baker 1949–72; and Professor Owen Hood Phillips 1974–86). The list of distinguished presidents includes lord chancellors, such as Hailsham, father and son, Master of the Rolls, Denning (three times); Donaldson; Bingham; Green, the majority of the great law lords of the 20th century and academic lawyers such as the international lawyer Sir Arnold McNair and the American jurist Dean Roscoe Pound to whom the Golden Medal of the American Bar Association was awarded for "conspicuous service to the cause of American jurisprudence" was presented in 1940. This medal is still worn by Holdsworth presidents when delivering their address. The vice-president of the club is Mr George Applebey, lecturer at law.

=== Holdsworth Society ===
The Holdsworth Society is the College Law Society of St John's College, Oxford. The Committee consists of the President (the previous year's Secretary), the Secretary and the Librarian. The Holdsworth Society attracts a high calibre of guest speaker, and also hosts termly black tie dinners. The social highlight of the Society's year is undoubtedly the Alumni Dinner, which is held in Hall at the end of Hilary Term.

The St John's College Law Library is named The Holdsworth Library after Sir William Searle Holdsworth, Fellow of St. John's 1897–1922 and Vinerian Professor of Law, and later Honorary Fellow. His portrait in pastels by E. Plachter can be seen there.

All initiates to the Holdsworth Society must take a solemn Sacramentum in order to be admitted to the Final Honour Schools programme, a peculiarity of St John's College's requirements for enrolment. The taking of the Holdsworth Sacramentum represents an important moment in an undergraduate's life, for until it is completed they cannot officially progress beyond Moderations (first year examinations) and be considered for the BA Jurisprudence.

== Publications ==
- A history of English law
  - Book I, The Judicial System, vol 1 (first published 1903; 2nd ed. 1914; 3rd ed. rewritten 1922; 4th ed. revised 1937; 5th ed. 1927; 6th ed. revised 1938; 7th ed. revised 1956).
  - Book II, Anglo-Saxon Antiquities (449–1066) vol 2 (first published 1903; 2nd ed. 1914; 3rd ed. rewritten 1923.)
  - Book III, The Mediaeval Common Law (1066–1485) vols 2 and 3 (first published 1903; 2nd ed. 1914; 3rd ed. rewritten 1923.)
  - Book IV, The Common Law and its Rivals (1485–1700) vols 4 to 5 (1924); 6 to 9
  - Book V, The Centuries of Settlement and Reform (1701–1875) vols 10 to 12 (1938); 13 to 16 (edited by A.L. Goodhart and H.G. Hanbury).
  - General Index, vol 17 (edited by John Burke).
- The Historians of Anglo-American Law. New York: Columbia University Press. 1928 – via Internet Archive., reprinted 1966.

== See also ==
- Vinerian Professor
- Leading historians of English legal history:
  - F. W. Maitland
  - Sir John Baker
  - David Ibbetson
  - S. F. C. Milsom

== Notes ==
Academic offices
Preceded by William Martin Geldart	Vinerian Professor of English Law; 1922—1944	Succeeded by Geoffrey Cheshire
