= Joseph Hirst Lupton =

English schoolmaster, cleric and writer

Joseph Hirst Lupton (1836–1905) was an English schoolmaster, cleric and writer.

== Life ==
Born at Wakefield, Yorkshire, on 15 January 1836, he was second son of Joseph Lupton, headmaster of the Greencoat School at Wakefield, by his wife Mary Hirst, who wrote verse. Educated first at Queen Elizabeth grammar school, Wakefield, and then at Giggleswick school, where he became captain, he was admitted on 3 July 1854 to a sizarship at St John's College, Cambridge. In 1858 he graduated B.A., with a first class in the classical tripos.

After assisting at Wakefield grammar school, Lupton was appointed, in 1859, second classical master in the City of London School, then in Milk Street, Cheapside; among his pupils there were Henry Palin Gurney and James Smith Reid. Ordained deacon in 1859 and priest in 1860, he served as curate at St. Paul's Church, Avenue Road, N.W., and afterwards to W. Sparrow Simpson, rector of St Matthew Friday Street. Proceeding M.A. in 1861, Lupton succeeded to the fellowship at St John's College, Cambridge vacated by John Eldon Gorst on 19 March 1861.

In 1864 Lupton was appointed sur-master and second mathematical master in St Paul's School, London, then in St. Paul's churchyard (from 1884 at Hammersmith). He remained sur-master for 35 years, the high masters being Herbert Kynaston and then Frederick William Walker. In 1897 Lupton became Latin master of the upper eighth and honorary librarian.

Lupton was Hulsean lecturer at Cambridge in 1887, became preacher to Gray's Inn in 1890, won the Seatonian prize for a sacred poem at Cambridge in 1897, and proceeded B.D. in 1893 with a thesis on The Influence of Dean Colet upon the Reformation of the English Church, and D.D. in 1896 with a dissertation on Archbishop William Wake's Project of Union between the Gallican and Anglican Churches (1717–1720). He died at Earls Terrace, Kensington, on 15 December 1905, and was buried in Hammersmith cemetery.

== Works ==
Lupton published Wakefield Worthies in 1864. He then researched John Colet, the founder of St Paul's School. He published for the first time the following works of Colet (with a translation and introduction, except for the first):

- De Sacramentis Ecclesiæ (1867) from the MS. in the library of St. Paul's;
- On the Hierarchies of Dionysius (1869);
- Exposition of St. Paul's Epistle to the Romans (1873);
- Exposition of St. Paul's First Epistle to the Corinthians (1874); and
- Letters to Radulphus on the Mosaic Account of the Creation, together with other Treatises (1876).

There followed, in 1883, a translation of the letters of Desiderius Erasmus to Jodocus Jonas (1519), containing the lives of Jehan Vitrier, warden of the Franciscan convent at St. Omer, and of Colet. In 1887 Lupton's major original work, The Life of Dean Colet (new edition 1909), gave an assessment of Colet's aims and career.

Lupton wrote also:

- St. John of Damascus in the "Lives of the Fathers for English Readers" series, 1882.
- An Introduction to Latin Elegiac Verse Composition, 1885; with key, 1886; reprinted, 1888; with vocabulary, 1893.
- An Introduction to Latin Lyric Verse Composition, 1888; with a key, 1888.
- Commentary on the First and Second Books of Esdras in the Apocrypha.

He edited Thomas More's Utopia in Latin from the edition of March 1518, and in English from the first edition of 1551; with introduction, notes and facsimiles (1895); and Erasmi Concio de Puero Jesu, a sermon on the Child Jesus by Erasmus, in an old English version of unknown authorship, with introduction and notes (1901).

Lupton was a contributor to the Dictionary of National Biography, to William Smith and Henry Wace's Dictionary of Christian Biography, to Hastings' Dictionary of the Bible, and to Notes and Queries.

== Family ==
Lupton married twice:

1. On 30 August 1864 Mary Ann (died October 1879), daughter of Thomas St. Clair MacDougal, a colleague at the City of London school (they had three sons and two daughters);
2. in 1884 Alice (died 1902), daughter of Thomas Lea of Highgate.

== Legacy ==
In Wakefield Cathedral, Lupton placed a stained glass window, by Charles Eamer Kempe, in memory of his parents.

After his retirement in 1899 the Lupton prize (for a knowledge of the Bible and Book of Common Prayer) was founded to commemorate at St Paul's School. In memory of his first wife Lupton erected a drinking fountain on Brook Green and founded the "Mary Lupton" prizes for French and German at St Paul's School for Girls. In memory of his second wife he founded the "Alice Lupton" prizes for music at St. Paul's School for Girls, and for scripture and church history at the North London Collegiate School for Girls.

== Notes ==
Attribution

This article incorporates text from a publication now in the public domain: Lee, Sidney, ed. (1912). "Lupton, Joseph Hirst". Dictionary of National Biography (2nd supplement). Vol. 2. London: Smith, Elder & Co.
