= High Master =

High Master may refer to:

- The Hochmeister or Grand Masters of the Teutonic Knights
- High Master (academic), denoting the heads of St Paul's School (London) and The Manchester Grammar School
