= Stephen Martin =

Stephen or Steven Martin may refer to:

- Stephen Martin (Australian politician) (born 1948), Australian politician and senior academic
- Stephen Martin (field hockey) (born 1959), Northern Irish Olympic field hockey player
- Stephen F. Martin, American chemist and professor of chemistry at the University of Texas at Austin
- Steven M. Martin (born 1954), actor and filmmaker
- S. I. Martin (born 1961), historian and novelist
- Stephen Martin (businessman) (born 1966), businessman and director general of the Institute of Directors
- Stephen A. Martin (1871–1957), American politician from the state of Iowa

== See also ==
- Steve Martin (disambiguation)
- Martin Stephan (1777–1846), pastor of St. John Lutheran Church in Dresden, Germany
- Martin Stephen (born 1949), headmaster of St Paul's School in London
- Martin Stephens (disambiguation)
