= Schoolmaster =

Term for a male school teacher

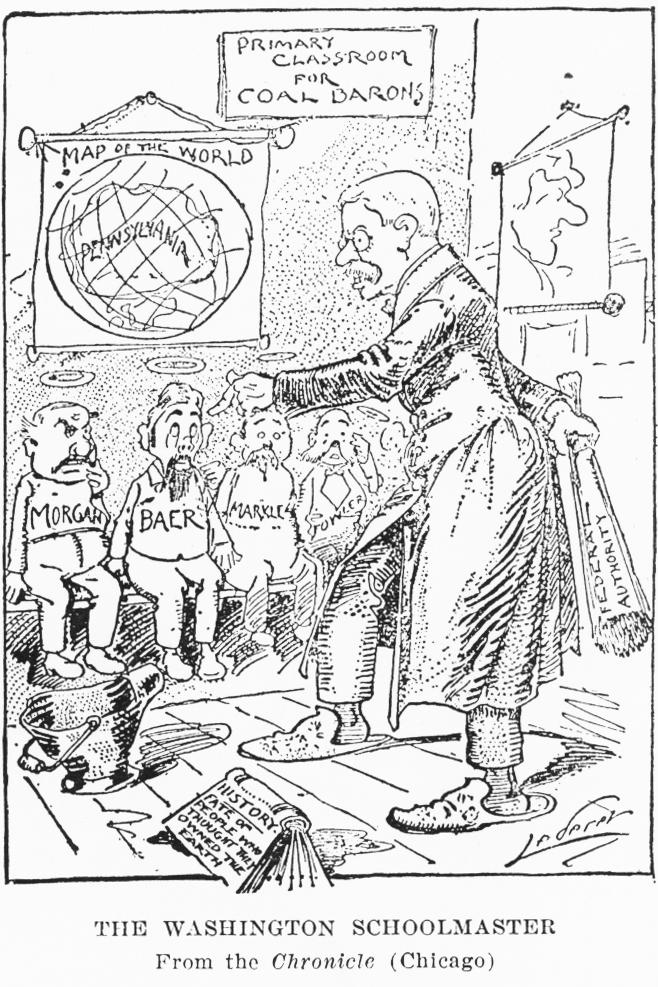
"The Washington Schoolmaster", a cartoon of 1902 from Chicago

A schoolmaster, or simply master, is a male school teacher. The usage first occurred in England in the Late Middle Ages and early modern period. At that time, most schools were one-room or two-room schools and had only one or two such teachers, a second or third being often called an assistant schoolmaster. The use of the traditional term survives in British private schools, both secondary and preparatory, and in grammar schools, as well as in some Commonwealth boarding schools (such as the Doon School in India) which are modelled on British grammar and public schools.

== Origins ==
The word "master" in this context translates the Latin word magister. In England, a schoolmaster was usually a university graduate, and until the 19th century, the only English universities were Oxford and Cambridge. Their graduates in almost all subjects graduated as Bachelors of Arts and were then promoted to Masters of Arts (magister artium), simply by seniority. The core subject in an English grammar school was Latin.

== Present usage ==
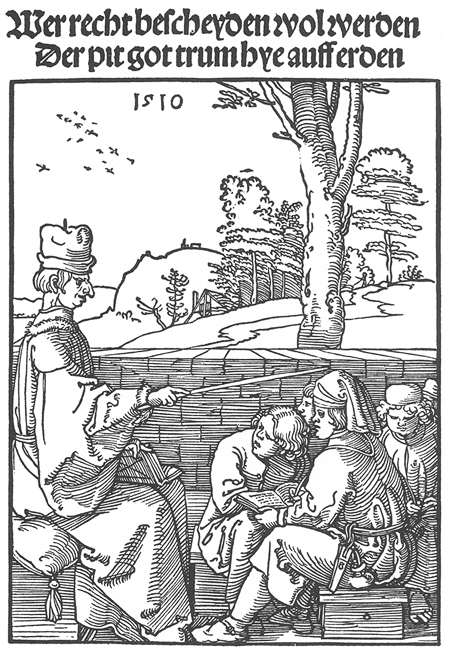
Schoolmaster, by Albrecht Dürer

Where a school has more than one schoolmaster, a man in charge of the school is the headmaster, sometimes spelt as two words, "head master". This name survives in British independent schools but has been replaced by head teacher in most British publicly funded schools, although "headmaster" is often still used colloquially, particularly in grammar schools, and is equivalent to the principal in American schools. The term "headmaster" also survives in some American and Commonwealth independent schools.

In such schools, a schoolmaster who is not the head is formally called an "assistant schoolmaster".

A range of other terms is derived from "schoolmaster" and "headmaster", including deputy headmaster (the second most senior teacher), senior master and second master (both used in some independent schools instead of deputy headmaster), and housemaster, the schoolmaster in charge of a boarding school house). Some independent schools use other titles for the head of the teaching staff, eg High Master, Rector, Warden.

The female equivalent of schoolmaster is schoolmistress, which is used with all the same prefixes. A Dame school was taught by a school dame, a local woman who would care for young children and teach them the alphabet for a small fee. Dame schools were localized, and could typically be found at the town or parish level.

== Older usage ==
=== Usher ===
An older term for the Second Master in a school in England was the Usher.

== Spelling ==
The term schoolmaster was once commonly two words, and the spelling has varied.

Roger Ascham's book The Scholemaster Or a Plaine and Perfite Way of Teachyng Children, to Understand, Write and Speake the Latin Tong was published in 1570.

In 1634, Henry Bury, former master of Bury Grammar School, left in his will £300 to the "ffree school" at Bury "for and towards the yearlie mentayninge of a school maister there, for to teach their children."

== See also ==
- Education in the United Kingdom

== Bibliography ==
- Ascham, Roger. The schoolmaster: or, A plain and perfect way of teaching children to understand, write, and speak the Latin tongue (1570; Based on the edition reproduced by Menston Scolar Press, 1967) (Google books text)
- Edward Egglestone, The Schoolmaster in Literature (2003)
