= St Paul's Gardens =

Park in the London Borough of Hammersmith & Fulham

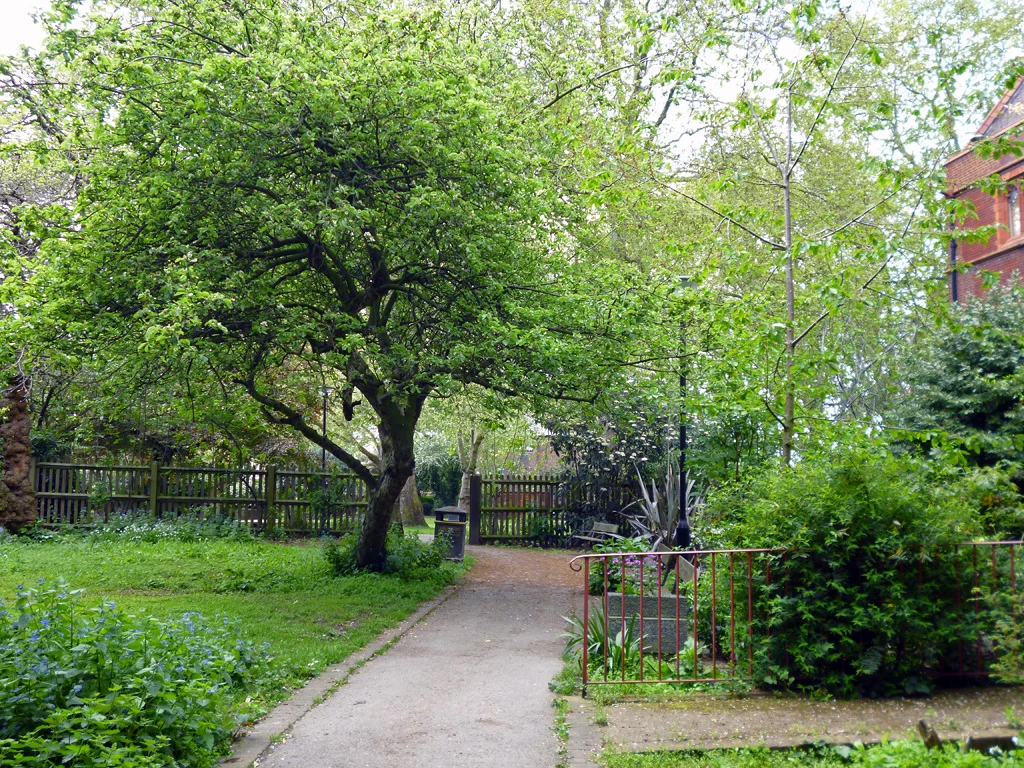
- St Paul's Gardens

- Location within London Borough of Hammersmith and Fulham
- Type: Public Park
- Location: Hammersmith and Fulham, London, England
- Nearest city: London
- OS grid: TQ239786
- Coordinates: 51.4939787°N 0.2147018°W
- Area: 0.63 hectares (1.6 acres)
- Created: 1987
- Operator: London Borough of Hammersmith & Fulham
- Open: 7.30am - dusk
- Status: Open year-round

St Paul's Gardens is a 0.63-hectare (1.6-acre) urban park in the London Borough of Hammersmith and Fulham, near Kensington Olympia.

St Paul's Gardens are located on the site of the former St Paul's School in Hammersmith, which became the Supreme Allied Headquarters for the 21st Army Group, commanded by St Paul's alumnus Field Marshal Montgomery. On 15 May 1944, the final decision to invade Normandy was taken at the site.

== History ==
=== World War II ===
St Paul's School was initially founded in the City of London in 1509. The school was relocated to Hammersmith in 1884. The Gothic school and the Victorian bothy building were designed by architect Alfred Waterhouse.

In 1939, the school was evacuated to Easthampstead Park, near Crowthorne, Berkshire. In July 1940, its buildings became the headquarters for the 21st Army Group, commanded by former pupil Field Marshal Montgomery. It was in the school's boardroom that Montgomery made plans for the D-Day landings.

On 15 May 1944, the final decision to invade Normandy was taken at the site at a conference with 145 present in the Lecture Theatre, including, King George VI, Prime Minister Winston Churchill and Generals Montgomery and Eisenhower. Operation Overload started on the beaches of Normandy on 6 June 1944.

During the War, three 'gun-ports' were added to the bothy for defence of the 21st Army Group.

The map used in the planning is still in the possession of St Paul's School and is on display in the Montgomery room of the new building just across the river.

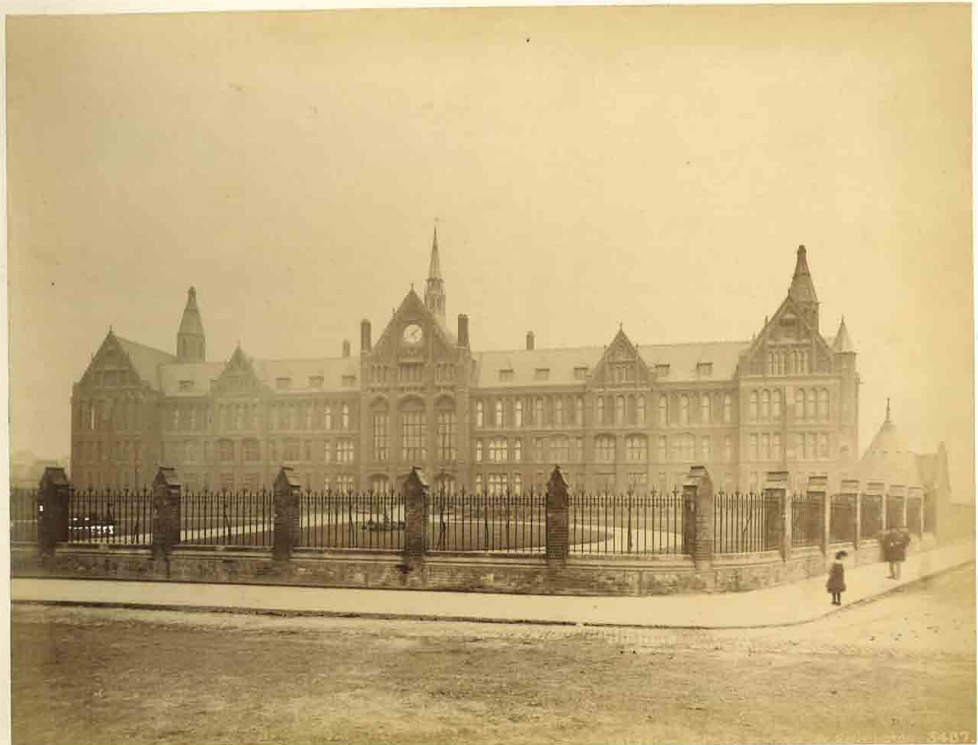
St Paul's School Gardens (London Borough of Hammersmith and Fulham Archives)

=== Conversion to gardens ===
In 1968, St Paul's School was relocated across the river to Barnes and the former main school buildings were demolished. Today, the boundary wall and railings, small circular Bothy (garden store), High Master's Lodge (now St Paul's Hotel) and Porter's Lodge are all that remain of the site and are Grade II listed.

In 2009, a plaque was erected by Hammersmith & Fulham Historic Buildings Group commemorating the D-Day Landing in June 1944.

On 6 June 2019, a plaque was funded by the Old Pauline Trust and unveiled by Major James Kelly to commemorate the 75th anniversary of the D-Day landings, describing the site and its importance in the planning of the D-Day landings.

In 2023, a full refurbishment of the bothy, listed on Historic England's risk register, was approved as part of Hammersmith & Fulham's Heritage and Conservation.

On 15 May 2024, the London Borough of Hammersmith and Fulham held a special event at the gardens to commemorate the 80th anniversary of the D-Day landings.
