= Edmund Martin Geldart =

Edmund Martin Geldart (1844–1885) was an English Anglican priest, Unitarian minister and scholar.

== Life ==
The second son of Thomas Geldart, of Thorpe Hamlet near Norwich, and his wife, Hannah Ransome Geldart, author of religious books for children (died 1861, aged 41), he was born in Norwich on 20 January 1844. His father was a Baptist who worked for the Country Towns Mission; his mother was born into a Quaker family, her father being the banker Simon Martin. For a short time he attended Merchant Taylors' School in London.

When Geldart was twelve years old his father, having taken on the Manchester City Mission, moved from London to Bowdon, Cheshire, and Geldart was sent to a school at Timperley. He developed a taste for entomology, and projected and, along with friends Thomas and J. B. Blackburn, edited a periodical entitled The Weekly Entomologist, published at twopence a number from August 1862 to November 1863.

After spending three months at Oxford, where moved, Geldart went to Manchester Grammar School, then under the mastership of Frederick William Walker. From school he was elected to a scholarship at Balliol College, Oxford, where he matriculated on 26 March 1863. Gerard Manley Hopkins was a college friend. He graduated B.A. in 1867, and was appointed assistant-master at Manchester Grammar School.

A breakdown compelled Geldart to give up his teaching post. He went abroad, and spent time at Athens, where he occupied himself as a teacher, and acquired a knowledge of the language and culture of modern Greece. In 1869 he again accepted a mastership of classics and modern languages at Manchester Grammar School, was ordained deacon by James Prince Lee, the Bishop of Manchester, and became curate of All Saints Church, Manchester. Two years later he took a curacy at St. George's Church, Everton, Liverpool, but did not retain it long: his religious views underwent a change, and in 1872 he joined the Unitarians.

Geldart graduated M.A. in 1873, and from the summer of that year until 1877 he acted as minister of the Hope Street Unitarian Chapel, Liverpool. At this period he was under the influence of the thought of James Martineau. He then moved to Croydon, where, after officiating as substitute for Robert Rodolph Suffield at the Free Christian Church, he was appointed pastor. He was thought an original preacher. At the end of his life he developed socialist opinions, became active in the Social Democratic Federation, and lost the confidence of some of his congregation. Early in 1885 his connection with Croydon Free Church ended.

== Death ==
In poor health, Geldart left home for Paris on 10 April 1885 for a holiday. He embarked at Newhaven, but was never heard of again, and it was supposed that he was lost on the night voyage to Dieppe.

== Works ==
Geldart was author of:

- The Modern Greek Language in its Relation to Ancient Greek, Clarendon Press, 1870.
- The Living God, 1872, one of the tracts issued by Thomas Scott of Ramsgate.
- The Church at Peace with the World: a Sermon suggested by the Death of David Friedrich Strauss, 1874.
- Translation of the second volume of Theodor Keim's Jesus of Nazara, 1876.
- Faith and Freedom: fourteen Sermons, 1881.
- A Son of Belial: autobiographical Sketches by Nitram Tradleg, 1882, autobiography, with the names of others disguised.
- A Guide to Modern Greek, 1883
- Simplified Grammar of Modern Greek, 1883.
- Sunday for our Little Ones: Unsectarian Addresses to the Young, 1883.
- The Gospel according to Paul: an Essay on the Germs of the Doctrine of the Atonement, 1884.
- Let there be Light: Sermon delivered at the opening of the New Free Christian Church, Croydon, 1884.
- Translation of Johann Georg von Hahn's Folk-Lore of Modern Greece, 1884.
- Translation of Georg Zacher's The Red International, 1885.
- Echoes of Truth: Sermons, &c., 1886, introduction by Charles Barnes Upton, edited by Charlotte Geldart.

== Family ==
On his return to England from Greece, Geldart married Charlotte Frederika Sophia Andler (1841–1923), daughter of a Württemberg government official. They had two children, one being William Martin Geldart.

== Notes ==
Attribution

This article incorporates text from a publication now in the public domain: Stephen, Leslie; Lee, Sidney, eds. (1890). "Geldart, Edmund Martin". Dictionary of National Biography. Vol. 23. London: Smith, Elder & Co.
