= Martin Stephens =

Martin Stephens may refer to:

- Martin Stephens (judge) (1939–2024), British judge
- Martin Stephens (politician) (born 1945), South African politician
- Martin Stephens (actor) (born 1949), English child actor
- Martin Stephens (drug smuggler) (born 1976), Australian bartender and convicted drug trafficker

== See also ==
- Martin Stephan (1777–1846), pastor of St. John Lutheran Church in Dresden, Germany
- Martin Stephen (born 1949), headmaster of St Paul's School in London
- Stephen Martin (disambiguation)
- Martin Stevens (disambiguation)
