= Martin Stevens =

Martin Stevens may refer to:

- Martin Stevens (politician) (1929–1986), British politician
- Martin Stevens (musician) (1953–2023), Canadian pop singer
- Martin Stevens (biologist) (fl. 2000s–2010s), British sensory and evolutionary ecologist

== See also ==
- Martin Stephens (disambiguation)
- Stephen Martin (disambiguation)
