= List of Old Paulines =

The following is a list of notable former pupils, known as Old Paulines, of St Paul's School (London). The abbreviation OP is sometimes used.

== 16th century ==
- John Leland (c.1503–1555); antiquary
- William Paget, 1st Baron Paget (1506-1563); statesman
- George Lily (died 1559); Catholic priest, biographer and topographer
- Peter Carew (1514–1575); adventurer
- Thomas Gresham (1519–1579); founder of the Royal Exchange
- William Harrison (1534–1593); clergyman and author of The Description of England
- William Camden (1551–1623); antiquary

== 17th century ==
- John Milton (1608–1674); poet
- Samuel Pepys (1633–1703); civil servant and diarist
- James Hayes (1637–1694); Prince Rupert's secretary and first Deputy Governor, Hudson's Bay Company.
- George Jeffreys (1645–1689); Lord Chief Justice
- Samuel Johnson (1649–1703) English political writer
- John Churchill (1650–1722); army officer and 1st Duke of Marlborough
- Edmond Halley (1656–1742); astronomer, geophysicist, and meteorologist.
- William Nicholls (1664–1712); theologian, an author on the Book of Common Prayer
- Spencer Compton (1674–1743); Earl of Wilmington and Prime Minister of Great Britain
- Roger Cotes (1682–1716); mathematician.

== 18th century ==
- Joshua Toulmin (1740–1815); Dissenting minister
- George Dance the Younger (1741–1825); architect
- John André (1750–1780); army officer and spy
- Thomas Taylor (1758–1835); scholar and translator
- Thomas Clarkson (1760–1846); anti-slavery campaigner
- Daniel Alexander (1768–1846); architect

== 19th century ==
- Richard Ryan (1797–1849); biographer, poet and playwright
- Joseph Blakesley (1808–1885); clergyman
- Benjamin Jowett (1817–1893); Master of Balliol College, Oxford
- Henry Baden-Powell KC (1847–1921); older brother of Robert Baden-Powell, founder of Sea Scouts, angler and notable canoe author & designer
- Ray Lankester (1847–1929); zoologist
- Cecil Clementi Smith (1849–1916); colonial administrator
- Bertrand Dawson, 1st Viscount Dawson of Penn (1864–1945); Royal physician
- Sidney Alexander (1866–1948); Newdigate Prize Winner and Canon, St. Paul's
- Gilbert Walker (1868–1958); physicist and statistician
- Charles Beazley (1868–1955); historian and academic
- Laurence Binyon (1869–1943); poet
- Sidney Barton (1876–1946); diplomat
- Sir Walter Willson (1876–1952), member of the Legislative Assembly of India.
- William Martin Geldart (1870–1922); jurist
- Aurobindo Ghose (1872–1950); Indian mystic, philosopher, poet, yogi and guru
- G. K. Chesterton (1874–1936); writer
- Bertram Hopkinson (1874-1918); lawyer and Professor of Mechanism and Applied Mechanics at Cambridge University
- Edmund Clerihew Bentley (1875–1956); journalist and poet
- Leslie Mathews (1875–1946); cricketer and educator
- Edward Thomas (1878–1917); poet
- Ernest Shepard (1879–1976); illustrator of Winnie the Pooh and The Wind in the Willows
- James Garnett (1880–1958); educationist, barrister, and peace campaigner
- Leonard Woolf (1880–1969); civil servant and political theorist
- Edward Ayrton (1882–1914); Egyptologist and archaeologist
- Compton Mackenzie (1883–1972); writer
- Otto Niemeyer (1883–1971), director at the Bank of England
- John Littlewood (1885–1977); mathematician
- Philip Clayton (1885–1972), founder of Toc H
- Duncan Grant (1885–1978), Bloomsbury painter
- Theodore Just (1886–1937), Olympic athlete
- Valentine Vivian (1886–1969); vice-chief of SIS; head of counter-espionage
- George Watson (1886–1965); mathematician
- Bernard Law Montgomery (1887–1976), World War II General and Field Marshal
- E. V. Rieu (1887-1972), classicist.
- Archibald Low, (1888–1956); scientist and inventor
- Eric Kennington, (1888-1960); artist
- G. D. H. Cole (1889–1959), political philosopher
- Leonard Hodgson (1889–1969), theologian
- Paul Nash (1889–1946); artist
- Roualeyn Cumming (1891–1981); cricketer and colonial police officer
- John Armstrong (1893–1973); artist
- Victor Gollancz (1893–1967); publisher
- Baron Hannen; judge
- Ewart Alan Mackintosh MC (1893–1917), war poet and an officer in the Seaforth Highlanders
- Henry Daniell (1894–1963); actor
- Leonard Barnes (1895–1977); anticolonialist writer and educationalist
- B. H. Liddell Hart (1895–1970); military strategist
- George Catlin (1896–1979); political scientist and philosopher
- Indra Lal Roy (1898–1918); World War I fighter ace
- Paul Shuffrey (1889-1955); colonial administrator, editor and publisher

== 20th century ==
- John Charles Burkill (1900-1993); mathematician.
- Hugh Schonfield (1901–1988); biblical scholar, critic of St Paul
- Jack Bartlett (1904–1983); racing driver and car dealer
- Desmond Nethersole-Thompson (1908–1989); renowned British ornithologist, naturalist and author
- Magnus Pyke (1908–1992); author, scientist
- Isaiah Berlin (1909–1997); political philosopher and historian of ideas
- Arthur Barmby (1909–1976); cricketer
- Max Beloff (1913–1999); historian
- George Ignatieff (1913–1989); Permanent Representative of Canada to the United Nations
- Buzzer Hadingham (1915-2004); Chairman of the All England Lawn Tennis and Croquet Club
- Frederick Valentine Atkinson (1916–2002); mathematician.
- Eric Newby (1919–2006); writer
- John Russell (1919–2008); chief art critic, NY Times
- Leonard Berney (1920–2016); Bergen-Belsen concentration camp liberator
- John Chadwick (1920–1998); linguist, assisted Michael Ventris in the 1953 decipherment of Linear B.
- Peter Racine Fricker (1920–1990), composer
- Norman Mischler (1920–2009); cricketer
- Dennis Brain (1921–1957); horn player
- Lister Sinclair (1921–2006); writer, actor, playwright and presenter with the Canadian Broadcasting Corporation
- Anthony Hinds (1922–2013); film producer and scriptwriter, known for Hammer Films
- Ian Allan (1922–2015); book publisher and railwayman
- Sir Ninian Stephen (1923–2017); Governor-General of Australia, Justice of the High Court of Australia
- Donald Nicol (1923–2003); byzantinist
- Nicholas Parsons (1923–2020); actor and television presenter
- Peter Hilton (1923–2010); mathematician
- Clement Freud (1924–2009); writer, broadcaster and politician
- James Moorhouse (1924–2014); politician
- Pete Murray (DJ) (born 1925); broadcaster and disc jockey
- Klaus Roth (1925–2015); mathematician, Fields medallist
- Patrick David Wall (1925–2001); neuroscientist
- John Thorn (1925–2023); headmaster of Repton and Winchester, chairman of the Headmasters' Conference for 1981
- Anthony Shaffer (1926–2001); author, playwright
- Richard Wilson (1926–2018); physicist
- Peter Shaffer (1926–2016); author, playwright
- Alexis Korner (1928–1984); blues musician
- Ioan James (1928–2025); mathematician
- Greville Janner (1928–2015), politician (Labour)
- John Dunwoody (1929–2006); politician (Labour)
- Stanley Sadie (1930–2005); musicologist, editor of the New Grove Dictionary of Music and Musicians
- Chris Barber (1930–2021); trombonist, jazz band leader
- Antony Jay (1930–2016); writer of Yes Minister, broadcaster
- Graeme MacDonald (1930–1997); television producer and executive
- Brian Widlake (1931–2017); presenter of The World at One and PM (BBC Radio 4) and The Money Programme (BBC Two)
- Oliver Sacks (1933–2015); neurologist, author
- David Wiggins (born 1933); philosopher
- Julian Bream (1933–2020); classical guitarist
- Kenneth Baker (born 1934); politician (Conservative)
- Jonathan Miller (1934–2019); theatre and opera director
- Basil Moss (1935–2020); television and radio actor
- Bob Jeffery (1935–2016), Dean Emeritus of Worcester
- Richard Gombrich (born 1937), professor of Sanskrit
- Benjamin Zander (born 1939); conductor
- Robert Winston (born 1940); biologist and television presenter
- Nicolas Belfrage (1940–2022), Master of Wine
- Neil Trevor Kaplan, (born 1942) High Court judge, Hong Kong
- Chris Green (born 1943); railway manager
- John Gilbert (born 1943), television writer, director and producer
- Rooney Massara (born 1943); Olympian
- Tim Razzall (born 1943), politician (Liberal Democrat) and solicitor
- John Simpson (born 1944); journalist
- Serge Lourie (born 1946); local politician and Leader of London Borough of Richmond upon Thames (Liberal Democrat)
- Paul Cartledge (born 1947); Levantis Professor of Greek Culture, Cambridge University
- Duncan Fallowell (born 1948); author
- David Abulafia (born 1949); historian
- Jon Blair (born 1950); television & film writer, director and producer
- Tim Hunkin (born 1950); inventor
- Lloyd Dorfman (born 1951); billionaire, philanthropist
- Terence Etherton (born 1951); Master of the Rolls
- Tim Fywell (born 1951), television and film director
- Philip Hardie (born 1951), professor and specialist in Latin literature, Cambridge University
- Duncan Haldane (born 1951), 2016 Nobel Prize in Physics laureate
- Richard Davenport-Hines (born 1953); historian, writer
- Roly Bain (1954–2016), clown-priest
- Sir David Bean (born 1954), Lord Justice of Appeal
- Nicholas Kroll (born 1954) CB civil servant
- Rob Manzoli (born 1954); musician, lead guitarist Right Said Fred
- Matilda Simon, 3rd Baroness Simon of Wythenshawe (born 1955), transgender peeress
- Glen Oglaza (born 1955); political correspondent of Sky News
- Tom Hayhoe (born 1956); director of healthcare organisations, offshore racing sailor
- David Shilling (born 1956); hat designer
- Luke Hughes (born 1957); furniture designer
- Simon Fraser (born 1958); Diplomat, Permanent Under-Secretary of State for Foreign Affairs July 2010 – July 2015
- Francis Wright (born 1958); actor and puppeteer
- Maxwell Caulfield (born 1959); actor
- Iain Gale (born 1959); journalist and author
- Euclid Tsakalotos (born 1960); Greek economist and politician, former Greek Minister of Finance
- Simon Milton (1961–2011); politician (Conservative)
- David Levin (born 1962); businessman, CEO of McGraw-Hill Education
- Ian Livingstone (born 1962); chairman and co-owner, London & Regional Properties
- Ben Watt (born 1962); musician
- Julian Hodgson (born 1963); grandmaster and former British chess champion
- Imre Leader (born 1963); mathematician, Othello player
- Peter Morgan (born 1963); screenwriter
- Gideon Rachman (born 1963); Journalist and Chief Foreign Affairs Commentator at the Financial Times
- James Reed (born 1963); chairman, Reed Group
- William Goodchild (born 1964); composer and orchestrator
- James Kennard (born 1964); rabbi and educationalist
- Patrick Marber (born 1964); playwright
- Jonathan Foreman (born 1965); journalist
- Stephen B. Streater (born 1965); entrepreneur, founder of Eidos
- Stephen Greenhalgh (born 1967); Deputy Mayor for Policing and Crime in London since June 2012
- Robert Asch (born 1968); journalist and author; co-editor of St Austin Review
- Ed Vaizey (born 1968); M.P. (Conservative) May 2005 – November 2019
- Neil Jones; Director of Studies in Law at Magdalene College, Cambridge
- Hal Cruttenden (born 1969); actor and comedian
- Dominic Frisby (born 1969); author, actor and comedian
- James Harding (born 1969); editor of The Times newspaper (Dec 2007–2012)
- Nick Quested (born 1969); filmmaker
- Alan Cox (born 1970); actor
- Jonny Dymond (born 1970); BBC correspondent and radio presenter
- James Hyman (born 1970); presenter
- James Max (born 1970); broadcaster, journalist
- Alex Chesterman (born 1970); entrepreneur
- George Osborne (born 1971); M.P. (Conservative) June 2001, Chancellor of the Exchequer May 2010 – July 2016
- Sam Houser (born 1971); president of Rockstar Games
- Patrick Neate (born 1971); novelist
- Sam Bain (born 1971); screenwriter; co-creator of Peep Show
- Sacha Tarter (born 1972); actor and screenwriter
- Theo Hobson (born 1972); theorist
- Jamie Bamber (born 1973); actor
- Tom Tugendhat (born 1973); M.P. (Conservative) May 2015 – present
- Dan Houser (born 1974); vice-president of Rockstar Games
- Simon Dennis (born 1976); rower and Olympic gold medalist
- Rory Kinnear (born 1978); actor
- Blake Ritson (born 1978); actor
- Dan Snow (born 1978); journalist & television presenter
- Robin Walker (born 1978); M.P. (Conservative) for Worcester 2010 – 2024
- Alex Edmans (born 1980); economist
- Tim Kash (born 1982); television presenter
- Hassan Damluji (born 1982), author and international development expert
- Robin Ticciati (born 1983); conductor
- Henry Lloyd-Hughes, (born 1985) actor
- Charlie Fink (born 1986); musician and member of folk band Noah and the Whale
- Ben Lloyd-Hughes, (born 1988) actor
- Winston Marshall (born 1988); musician and member of folk band Mumford & Sons
- Mark-Francis Vandelli (born 1989); television personality known for his role in Made in Chelsea
- Will Attenborough (born 1991); actor
- Sam Cato (born 1992); cricketer
- Arty Froushan (born 1993); actor
- David Ambler (rower) (born 1997); rower
- Freddie Davidson (born 1998); rower
- Tom Powe (born 1998); cricketer
- Richard Nartey (born 1998); footballer
- Hugo Lowell (born 1999); congressional reporter for Guardian US in Washington DC

== 21st century ==
- Krish Patel (born 2005); cricketer

== Victoria Cross recipients ==
Three Old Paulines have been awarded the Victoria Cross.

- Captain Randolph Cosby Nesbitt (1867–1956), British South Africa Police. Later promoted to major during the South African War. Awarded for act that took place during the Mashona Rebellion (Rhodesia) of 1896–1897. (OP 1880–1882)
- Major Cuthbert Bromley (1878–1915) 1st Lancashire Fusiliers. Awarded for act that took place during the First World War. (OP 1890–1895)
- Major Oliver Cyril Spencer Watson (1876–1918), Yeomanry, attached King's Own Yorkshire Light Infantry. Later promoted to lieutenant-colonel. Awarded for act that took place during the First World War. (OP 1888–95)
