= Leslie Mathews =

English cricketer and educator

Personal information
- Full name: Leslie Henry Staverton Mathews
- Born: 1 March 1875; Kensington, London, England
- Died: 7 April 1946 (aged 71); Fulham, Middlesex, England
- Batting: Unknown
- Role: Wicket-keeper

Domestic team information
- Years: Team
- 1897: Oxford University

Career statistics
| Competition | First-class |
|---|---|
| Matches | 2 |
| Runs scored | 9 |
| Batting average | 9.00 |
| 100s/50s | –/– |
| Top score | 9 |
| Catches/stumpings | 1/– |
- Source: Cricinfo, 9 June 2020

Leslie Henry Staverton Mathews (1 March 1875 – 7 April 1946) was an English first-class cricketer and educator.

Mathews was born at Kensington in March 1875. He was educated at St Paul's School, before going up to Balliol College, Oxford. While studying at Oxford, he made two appearances in first-class cricket for Oxford University in 1897 against the Gentlemen of Philadelphia at Oxford and the Marylebone Cricket Club at Lord's. Mathews also boxed as a heavyweight for Oxford against Cambridge in 1897.

After graduating from Oxford, he became an assistant master at St Paul's in 1899. Mathews died at Fulham in April 1946.
