= A. V. Dicey =

British jurist and constitutional theorist (1835–1922)

A. V. Dicey KC FBA
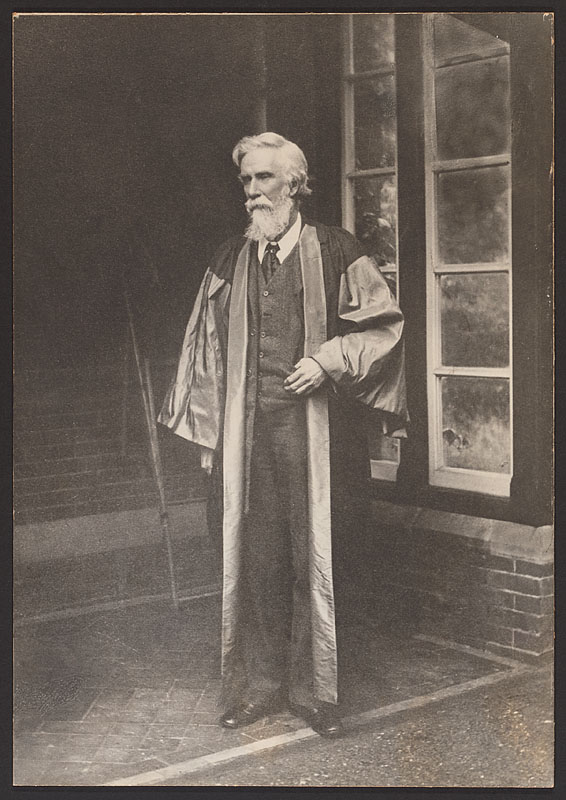
- Born: Albert Venn Dicey; 4 February 1835; Lutterworth, Leicestershire, England
- Died: 7 April 1922 (aged 87); Oxford, England
- Resting place: St Sepulchre's Cemetery in Walton Street, Oxford
- Education: Balliol College, Oxford
- Occupations: Jurist, professor
- Known for: Authority on the Constitution of the United Kingdom
- Title: Vinerian Professor of English Law
- Predecessor: John Robert Kenyon
- Successor: William Martin Geldart
- Spouse: Elinor Mary Bonham-Carter
- Parent(s): Thomas Edward Dicey (father); Annie Marie Stephen (mother)
- Relatives: Edward Dicey (brother); Sir James Stephen (uncle), Leslie Stephen (cousin); James Stephen (grandfather)

Albert Venn Dicey, KC, FBA (4 February 1835 – 7 April 1922) was a British Whig jurist and constitutional theorist. He is most widely known as the author of Introduction to the Study of the Law of the Constitution (1885). The principles it expounds are considered part of the uncodified British constitution. He became Vinerian Professor of English Law at Oxford, one of the first Professors of Law at the LSE Law School, and a leading constitutional scholar of his day. Dicey popularised the phrase "rule of law", although its use goes back to the 17th century.

== Biography ==
Dicey was born on 4 February 1835. His father was Thomas Edward Dicey, senior wrangler in 1811 and proprietor of the Northampton Mercury and Chairman of the Midland Railway. His mother was Annie Marie Stephen, daughter of James Stephen, Master in Chancery. Per his own words, Dicey owed everything to the wisdom and firmness of his mother. His elder brother was Edward James Stephen Dicey. He was also a cousin of Leslie Stephen and Sir James Fitzjames Stephen.

Dicey was educated at King's College School in London and Balliol College, Oxford, graduating with Firsts in classical moderations in 1856 and in literae humaniores in 1858. In 1860 he won a fellowship at Trinity College, Oxford, which he forfeited upon his marriage in 1872.

He was called to the bar by the Inner Temple in 1863, subscribed to the Jamaica Committee around 1865, and was appointed to the Vinerian Chair of English Law at Oxford in 1882, a post he held until 1909. In his first major work, the seminal Introduction to the Study of the Law of the Constitution, he outlined the principles of parliamentary sovereignty for which he is most known. He argued that the British Parliament was "an absolutely sovereign legislature" with the "right to make or unmake any law". In the book, he defined the term constitutional law as including "all rules which directly or indirectly affect the distribution or the exercise of the sovereign power in the state". He understood that the freedom British subjects enjoyed was dependent on the sovereignty of Parliament, the impartiality of the courts free from governmental interference and the supremacy of the common law. In 1890, he was appointed Queen's Counsel.

He later left Oxford and went on to become one of the first Professors of Law at the then-new London School of Economics. He published in 1896 his Conflict of Laws. Upon his death on 7 April 1922, Harold Laski memorialised him as "the most considerable figure in English jurisprudence since Maitland."

== Political views ==
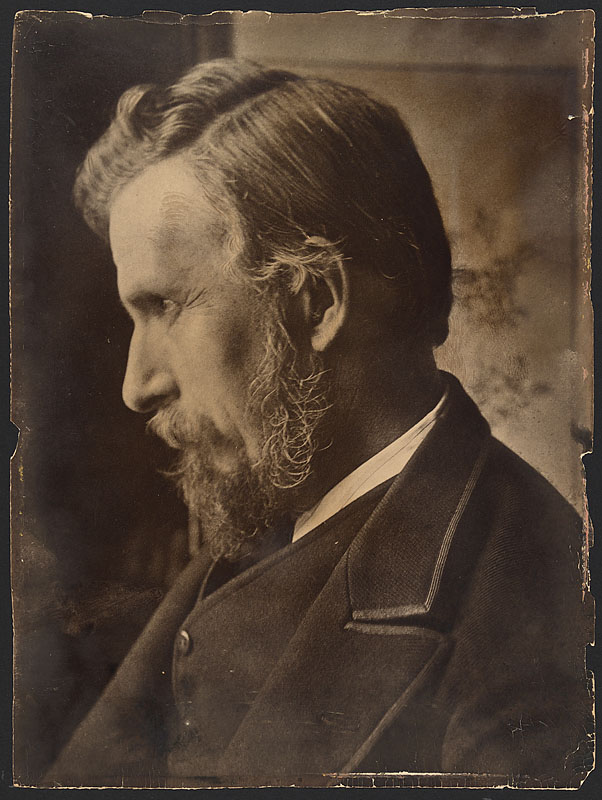
An undated photograph of Dicey from the Harvard Law School Library's Legal Portrait Collection

Dicey was receptive to Jeremy Bentham's brand of individualist liberalism and welcomed the extension of the franchise in 1867. He was affiliated with the group known as the "University Liberals", who composed the Essays on Reform and was not ashamed to be labelled a Radical. Dicey held that "personal liberty is the basis of national welfare." He treated Parliamentary sovereignty as the central premise of the British constitution.

A member of the Liberal Unionist Party, Dicey was a strong opponent of the Irish Home Rule movement, writing and speaking against it extensively from 1886 until shortly before his death, advocating that no concessions be made to Irish nationalism in relation to the government of any part of Ireland as an integral part of the United Kingdom. In March 1914 Dicey stated that if a Home Rule Bill was passed it "would be a political crime lacking all moral and constitutional authority...the voice of the present House of Commons was not the voice of the nation." He was thus bitterly disillusioned by the Anglo-Irish Treaty agreement in 1921 that Southern Ireland should become a self-governing dominion (the Irish Free State), separate from the United Kingdom.

Dicey was also vehemently opposed to women's suffrage, proportional representation (while acknowledging that the existing first-past-the-post system was not perfect), and to the notion that citizens have the right to ignore unjust laws. Dicey viewed the necessity of establishing a stable legal system as more important than the potential injustice that would occur from following unjust laws. In spite of this, he did concede that there were circumstances in which it would be appropriate to resort to an armed rebellion but stated that such occasions are extremely rare.

== Bibliography ==
- "The Balance of Classes". Essays on Reform. London: Macmillan and Co. 1867. pp. 67-84. hdl:2027/mdp.39015008287370 – via HathiTrust.
- A Treatise on the Rules for the Selection of the Parties to an Action. London: William Maxwell & Son. 1870 – via Google Books.
- The Law of Domicil as a Branch of the Law of England, Stated in the Form of Rules. London: Stevens and Sons. 1879 – via Internet Archive.
- "The Study of Jurisprudence". The Law Magazine and Review. V. London: Stevens & Haynes: 382–401. August 1880 – via Heinonline.
- "Conflict of Laws and Bills of Exchange". The American Law Review. XVI: 497-512. July 1882. hdl:2027/njp.32101065402396 – via HathiTrust.
- "Some Aspects of Democracy in England". North American Review. 137 (323): 317–326. October 1883. JSTOR 25118316.
- "Federal Government". Law Quarterly Review. 1 (1): 80-99. 1885 – via Google Books.
- Lectures Introductory to the Study of the Law of the Constitution (1st ed.). London: Macmillan and Co. 1885 – via Google Books.; Introduction to the Study of the Law of the Constitution (8th ed.). London: Macmillan and Co. 1915 – via Internet Archive.
- England's Case against Home Rule. London: John Murray. 1886 – via Google Books.
- The Privy Council: The Arnold Prize Essay. London: Macmillan and Co. 1887 – via Internet Archive.
- "Speech of Professor Dicey, at the Liberal Unionists' meeting, in the Music Hall, Birkenhead, December 10, 1887". "Daily Post" and "Echo" Offices. 1887. JSTOR 60243925.
- Letters on unionist delusions. London: Macmillan and Co. 1887 – via Internet Archive.
- "On Private International Law as a Branch of the Law of England - First Part". Law Quarterly Review. 6 (1): 1–21. 1890 – via Heinonline.
- "Democracy in Switzerland". Edinburgh Review. CLXXI: 113-145. January 1890 – via Internet Archive.
- "Ought the Referendum to be Introduced in England?". The Contemporary Review. 57: 489-511. April 1890. hdl:2027/mdp.39015078140723 – via HathiTrust.
- "On Private International Law as a Branch of the Law of England - Second Part". Law Quarterly Review. 7 (2): 113–127. April 1891 – via Heinonline.
- "Criteria of Jurisdiction". Law Quarterly Review. 8 (1): 21–39. 1892 – via Heinonline.
- "The Defence of the Union". The Contemporary Review. 61: 314-331. March 1892. hdl:2027/mdp.39015031962783 – via HathiTrust.
- A Leap in the Dark, or Our New Constitution. London: John Murray. 1893 – via Google Books.
- "The Referendum". The National Review: 65-80. March 1894. hdl:2027/uiuo.ark:/13960/t41r9dg89 – via HathiTrust.
- "Constitutional Revision". Law Quarterly Review. 11 (4): 387–392. 1895 – via Heinonline.
- A digest of the law of England with reference to the conflict of laws (1st ed.). 1896. 2nd ed. 1908;
  - later expanded in various editions of Dicey Morris & Collins
- "Will the Form of Parliamentary Government Be Permanent?". Harvard Law Review. 13 (2): 67–79. June 1899. doi:10.2307/1322745. JSTOR 1322745.
- "The Teaching of English Law at Harvard". Harvard Law Review. 13 (5): 422–440. January 1900. doi:10.2307/1323359. hdl:2027/hvd.32044053636155. JSTOR 1323359.
- "Droit Administratif in Modern French Law". Law Quarterly Review. 17 (3): 302–318. 1901 – via Heinonline.
- "Loans for the Making or Payment of Wagers". Law Quarterly Review. 20 (4): 436–438. 1904 – via Heinonline.
- "The Combination Laws as Illustrating the Relation Between Law and Opinion in England During the Nineteenth Century". Harvard Law Review. 17 (8): 511–532. June 1904. doi:10.2307/1323189. hdl:2027/hvd.hnz2vk. JSTOR 1323189 – via HathiTrust.
- "Paradox of Land Law in England". Law Quarterly Review. 21 (3): 221–232. 1905 – via Internet Archive.
- Lectures on the relation between law and public opinion in England during the nineteenth century (1st ed.). London: Macmillan and Co. 1905 – via Internet Archive.
- "Hyams v. Stuart King". Law Quarterly Review. 25 (1): 76–80. 1909 – via Heinonline.
- "Chetti v. Chetti". Law Quarterly Review. 25 (2): 202–205. 1909 – via Heinonline.
- Letters to a friend on votes for women (1 ed.). London: John Murray. 1909 – via Internet Archive.; Letters to a friend on votes for women - via Wikisource.
- "Blackstone's Commentaries". The National Review. liv: 653-676. December 1909 – via Internet Archive.
- "Blackstone's Commentaries". Canadian Law Times. 30 (3): 213–233. March 1910 – via Heinonline.
- "Locus Regit Actum". Law Quarterly. 26 (3): 277–279. 1910 – via Heinonline.
- "The Referendum and Its Critics". The Quarterly Review. 423: 538-562. April 1910 – via Internet Archive.
- "Professor Maitland". The Nation. 91 (2361): 292-293. 29 September 1910 – via HathiTrust.
- "The Extension of Law Teaching at Oxford". Harvard Law Review. 24 (1): 1–5. November 1910. doi:10.2307/1324642. JSTOR 1324642.
- A Fool's Paradise: Being a Constitutionalist's Criticism of the Home Rule Bill of 1912. London: John Murray. 1913 – via Internet Archive.
- "Private International Law". Law Quarterly Review. 28 (4): 341–347. 1912 – via Heinonline.
- "The Parliament Act, 1911, and the Destruction of All Constitutional Safeguards". Rights of Citizenship: A Survey of Safeguards for the People. London: Frederick Warne & Co. 1912. pp. 81-107 – via Internet Archive.
- Lectures on the relation between law and public opinion in England during the nineteenth century (2nd ed.). London: Macmillan. 1914 – via Internet Archive.
- "His Book and His Character". Memories of John Westlake. London: Smith, Elder & Co. 1914. pp. 17-42 – via Internet Archive.
- "The Right Hon. Arthur Cohen, K.C. (1830-1914)". Law Quarterly Review. 31: 96–105. 1915 – via Heinonline.
- "Development of Administrative Law in England". Law Quarterly Review. 31 (2): 148–153. 1915 – via Heinonline.
- "The New English War Cabinet as a Constitutional Experiment". Harvard Law Review. 30 (8): 781–791. June 1917. doi:10.2307/1327952. JSTOR 132795.
- The Statesmanship of Wordsworth: An Essay. Oxford: Clarendon Press. 1917 – via Internet Archive.
- "Reviewed Work: The Position of Foreign Corporations in American Constitutional Law by Gerard Carl Henderson". Harvard Law Review. 32 (7): 864–866. May 1919. doi:10.2307/1327769. JSTOR 1327769.
- Dicey, Albert V.; Rait, Robert S. (1920). Thoughts on the Union between England and Scotland. London: Macmillan – via Internet Archive.
- "England in 1848". The Quarterly Review. 234: 221–242. October 1920.
- Rait, Robert S., ed. (1925). Memorials of Albert Venn Dicey: Being Chiefly Letters and Diaries. London: Macmillan – via Internet Archive.
- Shinn, Ridgway F. Jr.; Cosgrove, Richard A., eds. (1996). Constitutional Reflections: The Correspondence of Albert Venn Dicey and Arthur Berriedale Keith. Lanham, MD; New York; London: University of America Press, Inc. – via Internet Archive.
- J.W.F. Allison, ed. (2013). The Oxford Edition of Dicey. Oxford: Oxford U.P. ISBN 978-0199685820., vol. 1 includes the first edition of Introduction, with the main addenda in later editions; vol. 2, The Comparative Study of Constitutions, provides largely unpublished lectures on comparative constitutional law, intended for a further book; both volumes have extensive editorial commentary.
- Conti, Gregory, ed. (2023). Albert Venn Dicey Writings on Democracy and Referendum. Cambridge University Press. doi:10.1017/9781108955799. ISBN 978-1-108-95579-9.

== Biographies ==
- Cosgrove, Richard A. (1980). The Rule of Law: Albert Venn Dicey, Victorian jurist. London: Macmillan – via Internet Archive.
- Cosgrove, Richard A. (23 September 2004). "Dicey, Albert Venn (1835-1922)". Oxford Dictionary of National Biography (online ed.). Oxford Dictionary of National Biography. (Subscription, Wikipedia Library access or UK public library membership required.)
- Ford, Trowbridge H. (1985). Albert Venn Dicey: The Man and His Times. Chichester: Rose.
- R. S. Rait (1937). "Dicey, Albert Venn (1835–1922)". In J. R. H. Weaver (ed.). The Dictionary of National Biography, 1922–1930. Oxford University Press. pp. 259-261 – via Internet Archive.
- Sheppard, Stephen M. (2008). "Dicey, Albert Venn (1835–1922)". In Hamowy, Ronald (ed.). The Encyclopedia of Libertarianism. Thousand Oaks, CA: Sage; Cato Institute. pp. 123–134. doi:10.4135/9781412965811.n77. ISBN 978-1412965804. LCCN 2008009151. OCLC 750831024.
- R.F.V.N. (1984). "Dicey, Albert Venn (4.2.1835 - 7.4.1922)". In Simpson, A. W. Brian (ed.). Biographical Dictionary of the Common Law. London: Butterworths. pp. 148–149. ISBN 978-0-406-51657-2 – via Internet Archive.

Academic offices
| Preceded by John Robert Kenyon | Vinerian Professor of English Law; 1882–1909 | Succeeded by William Martin Geldart |
