= Steve Martin (disambiguation) =

Steve Martin (born 1945) is an American actor and comedian.

Steve Martin may also refer to:

- Steve Martin (defensive tackle) (born 1974), American football player for several teams, 1996–2004
- Steve Martin (defensive end) (born 1964), American football defensive end for the Washington Redskins, 1987
- Steve Martin (motorcyclist) (born 1968), Australian superbike rider
- Steve Martin (Virginia politician) (born 1956), Virginia state senator
- Steve Martin (Oklahoma politician), member of the Oklahoma House of Representatives
- Steve Martin (rugby league) (born 1957), Australian rugby league footballer and coach
- Steve Martin (sportscaster) (born 1952), American sportscaster
- Steve Martin (Tasmanian politician) (born 1960), Australian politician
- Steve Martin (Western Australian politician), member of the Western Australian parliament
- Steve Martin (academic) (born 1961), director of the Wales Centre for Public Policy
- Steve Martin (bowler), American ten-pin bowler
- Steve Burnett-Martin, also known as Blacker Dread, British record store owner
- Steve Martin, a reporter played by Raymond Burr in both the 1956 film Godzilla, King of the Monsters! and the 1985 film Godzilla 1985

== See also ==
- Stephen Martin (disambiguation)
- Steve Martini (born 1946), American novelist
- Steven Martini (born 1975), entertainment personality
- Steve Martins (born 1972), hockey player
- Steve Martin Caro (1948–2020), lead singer for The Left Banke
- Steve Martino (born 1959), American director and designer
- Stevie Martin (born 1988), English comedian
