= Synthome =

The synthome comprises the set of all reactions that are available to a chemist for the synthesis of small molecules. The word was coined by Stephen F. Martin.
