= William Martin Geldart =

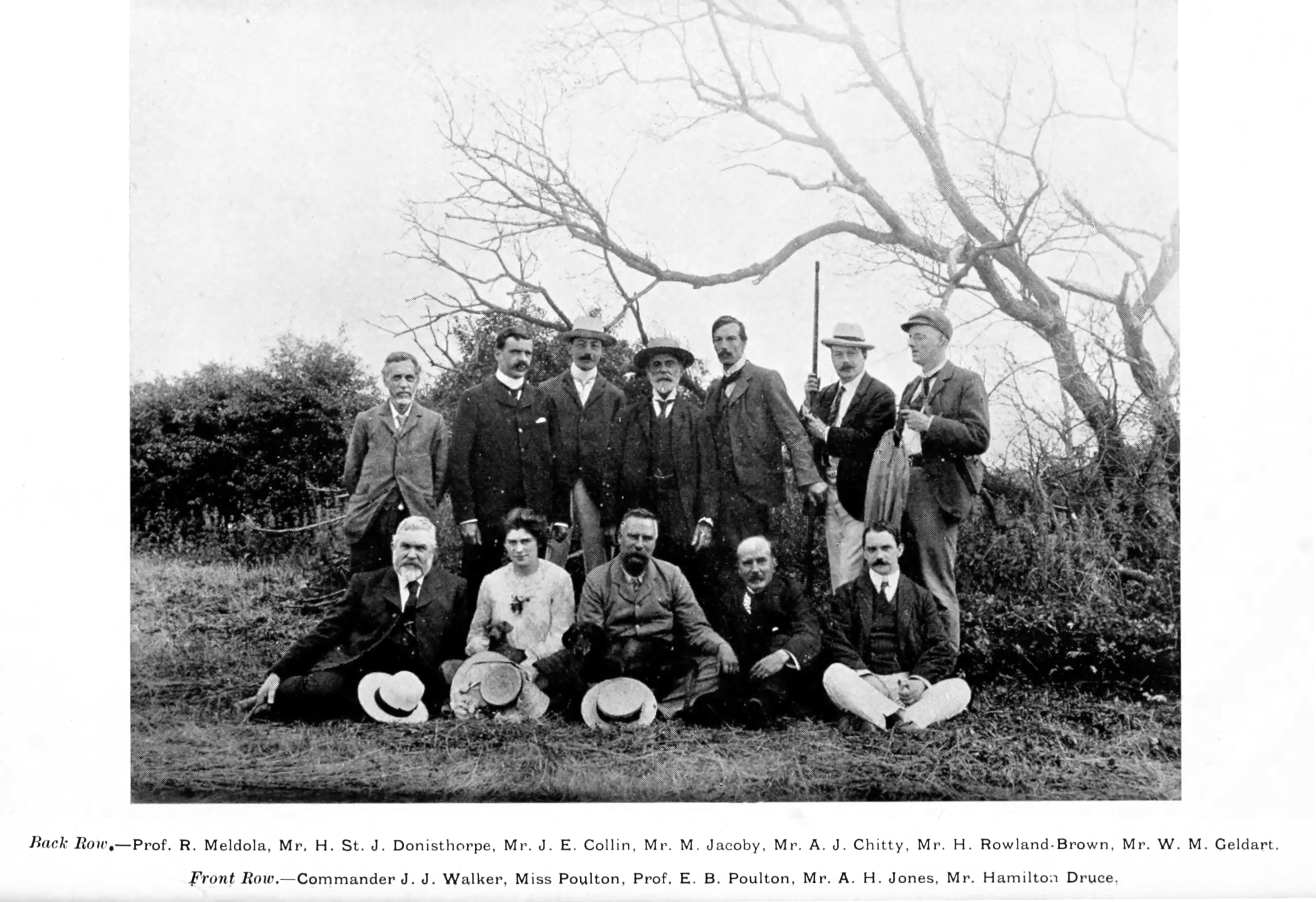
- Geldart with the Entomological Society in 1904 (standing, right)
- Born: 7 June 1870
- Died: 12 February 1922 (aged 51)
- Occupation: Jurist
- Known for: Vinerian Professor of English Law at Oxford, wrote Elements of English Law (1907)

William Martin Geldart CBE (7 June 1870 – 12 February 1922) was a British jurist. A classical scholar of Balliol College, Oxford, he went on to become Vinerian Professor of English Law at Oxford and a leading jurist of his day.

== Biography ==
Son of the Rev. Edmund Martin Geldart, he was educated at Whitgift School, Croydon; St Paul's School, and Balliol College, Oxford, where he was a scholar and in 1890 won the Gaisford Prize for Greek Verse. He graduated MA in 1892.

Elected a Fellow of St John's College, Oxford, in 1892, he was called to the bar from Lincoln's Inn in 1896, continuing at St John's until 1899. He was Official Fellow and Lecturer in Law at Trinity College, Oxford, from 1901 to 1909, All Souls Reader in English Law in the University, from 1906 to 1909, and Vinerian Professor of English Law and a fellow of All Souls College from 1909 to 1922. He was a member of the Hebdomadal Council from 1905 and chairman of the university's Delegacy for Women Students from 1911 until it was dissolved in 1921.

He married his wife Emily in 1905.

The law library at St Anne's College, Oxford is named after Geldart, who left his law books and reports to the women students of the university. The law society of the college, 'The Geldart Society', is also named in his honour.

== Works ==
Geldart was the author of the influential Elements of English Law (1911), still in print under the title Introduction to English Law (Oxford University Press, 11th edition, ed. David Yardley). According to one review "Geldart has over the years established itself as the standard account of English law..."

He also coedited Aristophanes Comoediae, a 1906–1907 edition of the comedies of Aristophanes, with Frederick William Hall.

== Honours ==
He was appointed Commander of the Order of the British Empire in 1917.

Academic offices
Preceded by A. V. Dicey	Vinerian Professor of English Law; 1909—1922	Succeeded by William Searle Holdsworth
