= Introduction to the Study of the Law of the Constitution =

1885 book by Albert Venn Dicey

Introduction to the Study of the Law of the Constitution is a book by A. V. Dicey about the constitution of the United Kingdom. It was first published in 1885.

Dicey was named the Vinerian Professor of English Law at the University of Oxford in 1883. He began delivering the lectures that were to become Introduction on 28 April 1884. In a letter to Macmillan on 9 June, he proposed that they be turned into a book. The book was published as Lectures Introductory to the Study of the Law of the Constitution in late 1885. Early reviews were generally favourable.

In the book's third edition, published in 1889, its title was changed to Introduction to the Study of the Law of the Constitution. A seventh edition appeared in 1907. By its eighth edition, published in 1915, a reviewer for the American Political Science Review wrote that Introduction was "accepted as a standard work on the English constitution". Dicey wrote a long introduction to the eighth edition in which he argued that the rule of law had declined in Britain since the first edition of Introduction was published. A ninth edition was published in 1939. Philip Norton wrote in a 1984 book that Introduction was the "most influential work of the past century" on the British constitution.

Introduction identifies basic principles of English constitutional law including parliamentary sovereignty and the rule of law. According to Dicey, the rule of law, in turn, relies on judicial independence.

In Introduction, Dicey distinguishes a historical understanding of the constitution's development from a legal understanding of constitutional law as it stands at a point in time. He writes that the latter is his subject. However, J. W. F. Allison argues, Dicey nonetheless relies on historical facts and examples to bolster his argument.

== Works cited ==
- Allison, J. W. F. (December 2007). "History in the Law of the Constitution". The Journal of Legal History. 28 (3): 263–282. doi:10.1080/01440360701698304. ISSN 0144-0365.
- Fletcher, Ian Christopher (17 March 2008). "'This Zeal for Lawlessness': A. V. Dicey, The Law of the Constitution, and the Challenge of Popular Politics, 1885–1915". Parliamentary History. 16 (3): 309–329. doi:10.1111/j.1750-0206.1997.tb00579.x.
- Foley, Michael (1989). The Silence of Constitutions: Gaps, "Abeyances," and Political Temperament in the Maintenance of Government. Routledge. ISBN 0-415-03068-4. OCLC 19126066.
- Norton, Philip (1984). The Constitution in Flux. B. Blackwell. ISBN 0-631-14155-3. OCLC 15342521.
- Sugarman, David (1991). "'A Hatred of Disorder': Legal Science, Liberalism and Imperialism". In Fitzpatrick, Peter (ed.). Dangerous Supplements: Resistance and Renewal in Jurisprudence. Pluto Press. ISBN 0-7453-0336-6. OCLC 22544641.
- Walters, Mark D. (12 November 2020). A.V. Dicey and the Common Law Constitutional Tradition: A Legal Turn of Mind. Cambridge University Press. doi:10.1017/9781139236249. ISBN 978-1-139-23624-9.
