= James Smith Reid (author) =

British classical scholar and historian (1846–1926)

James Smith Reid, FBA (1846–1926) was an English author, scholar and historian.

He was educated at the City of London School, which was then in Milk Street, Cheapside, whose masters included Joseph Hirst Lupton.

He was appointed the first Professor of Ancient History at the University of Cambridge, serving from 1899 to 1925.

He was author of numerous articles in the Encyclopædia Britannica (11th ed., 1911) and a great number of Latin textbooks, and also translated Cicero's Academica.

== Works ==
- The Municipalities of the Roman Empire (Cambridge: University Press, 1913)
