= Herbert Kynaston =

British headmaster (1809–1878)

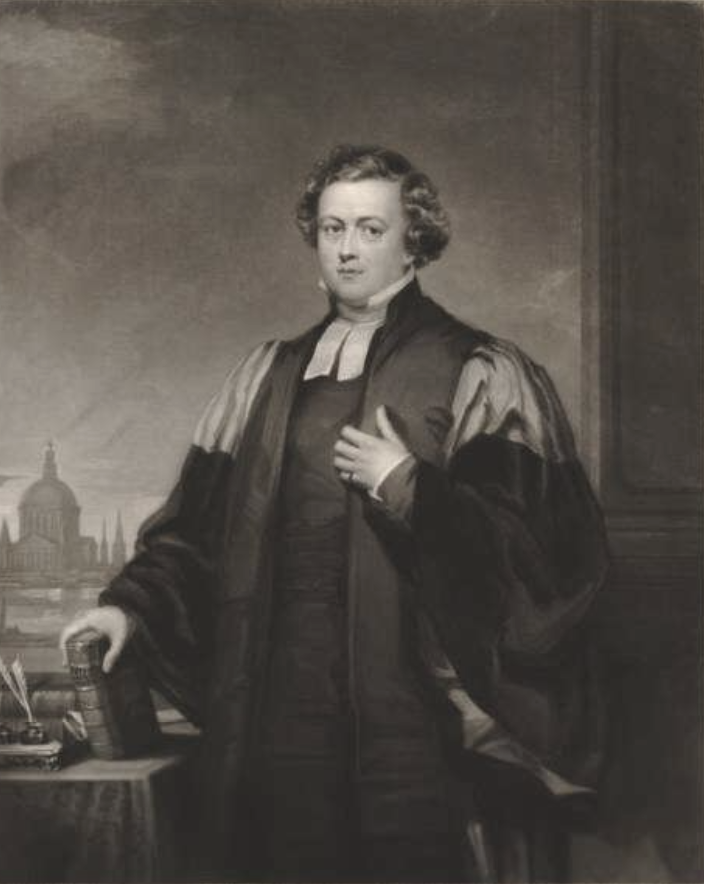
Herbert Kynaston, 1855 engraving

Herbert Kynaston (1809–1878) was High Master (headmaster) of St Paul's School, London, for 38 years. He was also a priest in the Church of England and a prebendary in St. Paul's Cathedral.

== Biography ==
The second son of Roger Kynaston, by his marriage to Georgiana, third daughter of Sir Charles Oakeley, 1st Baronet, governor of Madras, he was born at Warwick in 1809 and educated at Westminster School from 1823.

Kynaston was admitted to Christ Church, Oxford, in 1827, and matriculated on 30 May. He obtained the college prize for Latin verse (subject, Scythae Nomades) in 1829, took a first-class in Classics in 1831, and was appointed tutor and Greek reader in 1836. He graduated B.A. in 1831, M.A. in 1833, and B.D. and D.D. in 1849.

At Oxford Kynaston was university select preacher in 1841, and was subsequently a lecturer at his college in philology. In 1834 he was ordained, and served as curate of Culham, Oxfordshire. Four years later, aged 28, he was elected High Master of St. Paul's School, London, on the retirement of Dr John Sleath, holding the post for 38 years. Lord Truro, an Old Pauline, presented him in 1850 to the city living of St. Nicholas Cole Abbey, with St Nicholas Olave, which he held until the parishes were amalgamated with St. Mary Somerset in 1866. He resigned the mastership of St. Paul's in 1876, and the only preferment which he held at the time of his death was the prebendal stall of Holborn in St. Paul's Cathedral, to which he was presented by Bishop Charles Blomfield in July 1853.

== Death and family ==
He died at 31 Alfred Place West, South Kensington, on 26 October 1878, and was buried at Friern Barnet on 2 November. He had married in 1838 Elizabeth Selina, daughter of Hugh Kennedy of Cultra, co. Down. The library at St. Paul's School had a marble bust by George Halse.

=== Works ===
Kynaston was a noted composer of Latin verse: he was the author of poetical compositions in praise of Dean Colet, the founder of St. Paul's School, which were produced each year at the apposition. Among these the Number of the Fish, 1855, and the Lays of the Seven Half-centuries, written for the seventh jubilee (1859), became the best known. He was a candidate for the chair of poetry at Oxford in 1867, but was defeated by a college contemporary, Sir Francis Hastings Doyle.

Also a writer and translator of hymns, Kynaston did work which Julian's Dictionary of Hymnology calls "either strangely overlooked" or "unknown to most modern editors".

Kynaston wrote:

- Psittaco suum Chaire, 1840.
- Miscellaneous Poetry, 1841 (contains reminiscences of his life as a curate).
- Prolusiones Literariæ in D. Pauli Schola recitatæ comitiis maximis, 1841.
- Terentii Adelphorum Prologus et Epilogus, 1842.
- Strena Poetica, 1849.
- Commemoration Address in praise of Dean Colet, 1852.
- Ὁ Ἀριθμός τῶν ἰχθύων (Ho Arithmos tōn ichthyōn). By the Scholæ Paulinæ Piscator primarius, 1856.
- Ipsum Audite. Hymnus super fundatione D. Pauli Scholæ, 1857.
- The Glory of Paradise. By Peter Damiani, edited, with a translation, 1857.
- Puerorum centum quinquaginta trium canticum centenarium. Rhythmus in D. Pauli Scholæ auditorio modis admixtis recitatus, 1858.
- Rete Coletinum, 1861.
- Saturnalium Intermissio. Carmen Latinum in divi Pauli Schola recitatum, 1862.
- Occasional Hymns. Original and Translated, 1862; 2nd ser. 1864.
- The Number of the Fish. A Poem on St. Paul's School, 1864.
- Doce, Disce aut Discede. Carmen elegiacum anniversarium, 1864.
- Cantica Coletina, quotidiana anniversaria centenaria, 1867.

Besides a number of minor pieces in pamphlet form, including Coleti Torquis, 1867, Comitiorum Coletinorum Intermissio, 1871, Missiones Coletinæ, 1873, Coleti Sepulcrum, 1873, Kynaston also wrote a long series of Latin hymns in the Guardian, the last of which, entitled Ichthyōn katalogos, was recited at the "Winter Speeches" of 1876, when Kynaston retired from office.

== Sources ==
Attribution

This article incorporates text from a publication now in the public domain: Lee, Sidney, ed. (1892). "Kynaston, Herbert". Dictionary of National Biography. Vol. 31. London: Smith, Elder & Co.
