= Stephen F. Martin =

American chemist

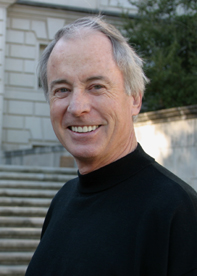
- Citizenship: United States
- Education: University of New Mexico; Princeton University
- Awards: Ernest Guenther Award (2017)
- Scientific career
- Fields: Organic Chemistry
- Workplaces: University of Texas at Austin

Stephen F. Martin is an American chemist and professor of chemistry at The University of Texas at Austin. He is the M. June and J. Virgil Waggoner Regents Chair in Chemistry.

Martin is a native of New Mexico, and received his B.S. degree in chemistry from the University of New Mexico in 1968, where he worked with R.N. Castle, and his Ph.D. from Princeton University in 1972 with Professor Edward C. Taylor. He did postdoctoral work at LMU Munich with Professor Rudolf Gompper, and further work with Professor George Büchi at the Massachusetts Institute of Technology; after which, he joined the faculty at the University of Texas at Austin.

He is best known for his work in alkaloid synthesis. He also developed the use of p-nitrobenzoate as a nucleophile for the displacement of activated alcohols in the Mitsunobu reaction. Martin is also known for coining the term synthome, which is defined as the set of all reactions available to the chemist for the synthesis of small molecules".

== Research focus ==
Currently, Martin’s research interests lie in the areas of synthetic organic and bioorganic chemistry. In the former, his focus lies in the development of new strategies and tactics and their application to the concise syntheses of a wide variety of complex natural products, including alkaloids, C-aryl glycosides, and polyketides that exhibit useful biological activities.

In the area of bioorganic chemistry he is investigating the design and synthesis of novel peptidomimetics as well as other small molecules for use as molecular probes to study energetics, dynamics, and function in protein-ligand interactions. The energetic consequences of pre-organization of ligands in their biologically active conformation is a recurring theme in his lab. Furthermore, he is involved in several programs directed towards the structure-based design of enzyme inhibitors.

== Recognition ==
Martin has received a number of awards honoring his accomplishments, including a NIH Career Development Award, an American Cyanamid Academic Award, the Alexander von Humboldt Prize, an Arthur C. Cope Scholar Award, a Japanese Society for the Promotion of Science Award, and a Wyeth Research Award, and he is a fellow of the American Association for the Advancement of Science. He serves as a consultant for several pharmaceutical and biotechnology companies, and he is the regional editor of Tetrahedron for the Americas. He has delivered numerous invited lectures at national and international meetings, academic institutions, and industrial companies, and he has published over 250 scientific papers in primary journals together with several reviews and articles in books. He is also co-author of the popular undergraduate laboratory book Experimental Organic Chemistry: A Miniscale and Microscale Approach.
