= Frederick William Walker =

English headmaster

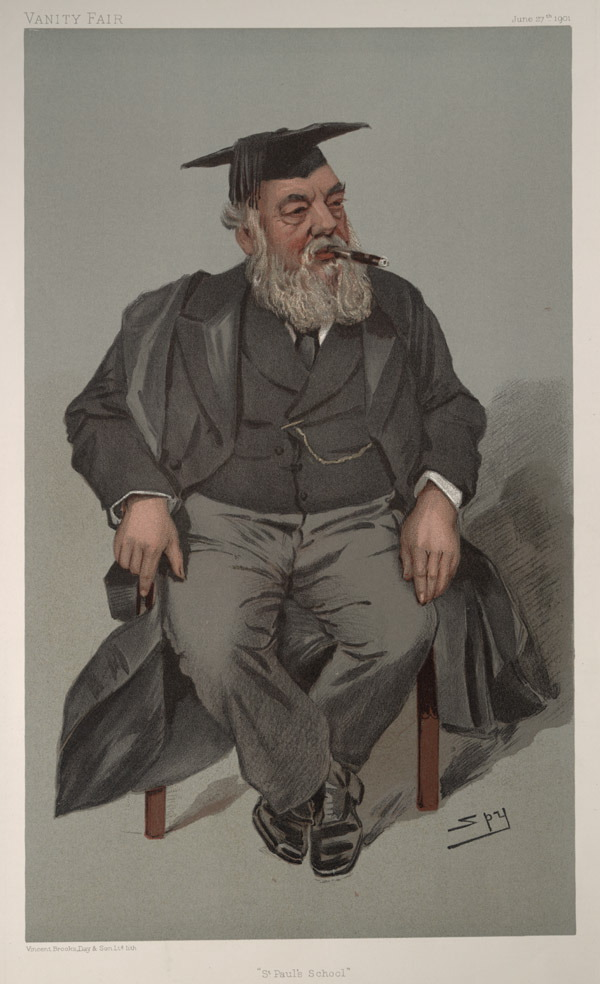
Caricature of Frederick William Walker by Spy for Vanity Fair, 1901

Frederick William Walker (1830–1910) was an English headmaster who was successively High Master of Manchester Grammar School and St Paul's School, London.

== Life ==
Walker was born in London in 1830, the son of an Irishman and educated at St Saviour's Grammar School, Southwark, Rugby School and Corpus Christi College, Oxford. After graduating in the Classics he became a Fellow and Tutor of Corpus and was called to the Bar at Lincoln's Inn.

In 1860 he was appointed High Master of Manchester Grammar School and, as a result of his rapid success in raising the standard of teaching at the school, was obliged to introduce entrance examinations in 1862. Between then and 1876 the size of the school grew from 250 pupils to 750. In 1867 fee-paying pupils were accepted, enabling the school to introduce modern subjects such as science to the curriculum.

In 1877 he left to succeed Herbert Kynaston as High Master at St Paul's School, the first High Master in over a century not to be in Holy Orders. At St Paul's he oversaw the move of the school from its historic location in the City of London to a new sixteen-acre site at Hammersmith. The site had been bought for £41,000 and architect Alfred Waterhouse created the new building of red brick and terracotta in 1884. Under Walker's headship the school grew rapidly in numbers from 211 boys in 1884 to 573 in 1888 and became the most successful school in the country in terms of gaining entrance scholarships to Oxford and Cambridge. The new site also allowed the introduction of compulsory games and the reintroduction of boarding.
