= High master (academic) =

High master is the term used, in place of the more conventional "headmaster", "head teacher" or "principal", to denote the head teachers of two English public schools: The Manchester Grammar School and St Paul's School in London. Two notable high masters of both schools were Frederick William Walker, who served at Manchester Grammar 1860–1877, and St Paul's 1877–1905; and Martin Stephen, who served at Manchester Grammar 1994–2004, and St Paul's 2004–2011. The incumbent high masters of Manchester Grammar and St Paul's are Martin Boulton and Sally-Anne Huang respectively.

The equivalent high mistress is used for female headteachers at some independent schools, including St Paul's Girls' School and Abercorn School.
