= Martin Stephen =

British author (born 1949)

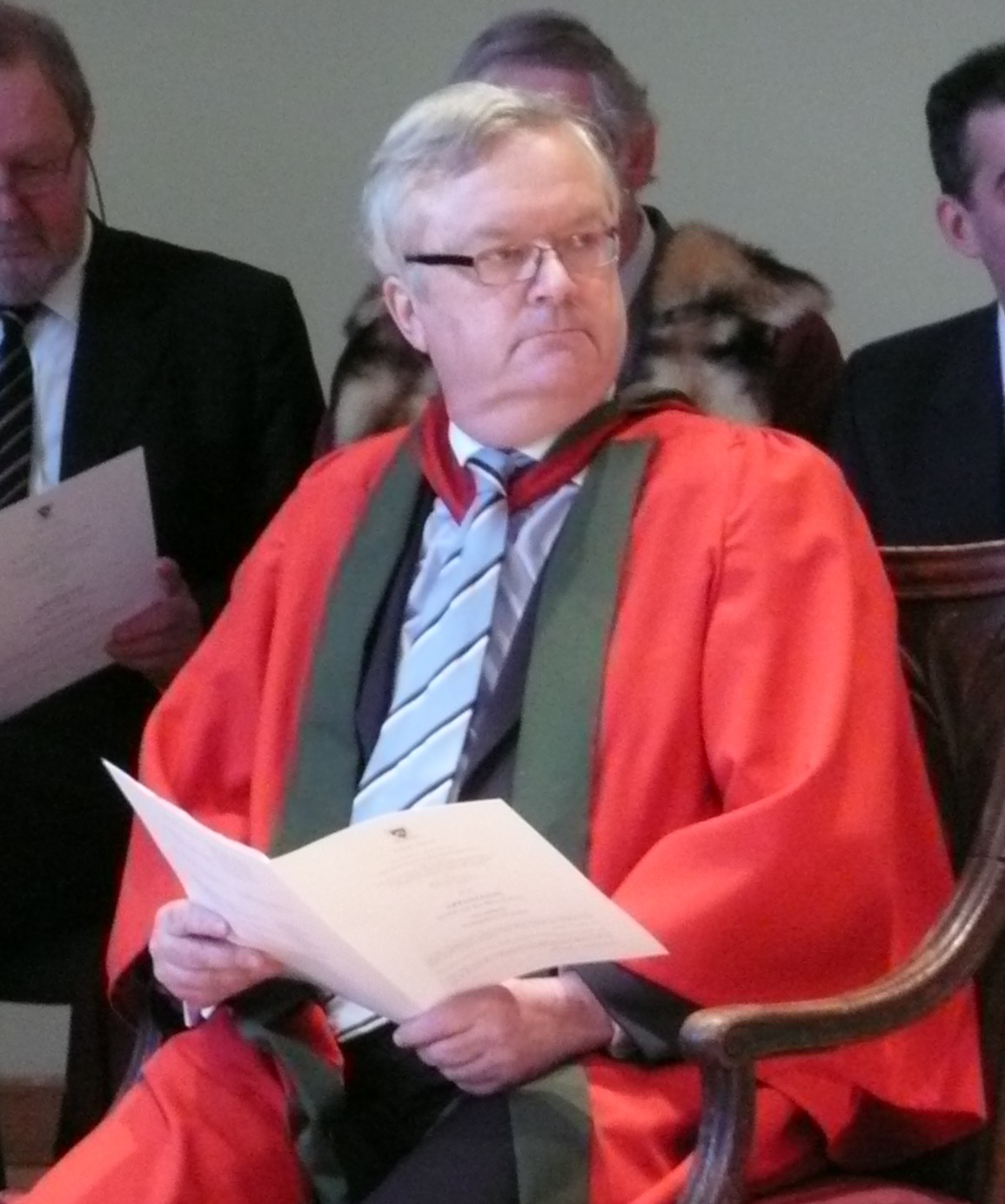
- Stephen at St Paul's School's Apposition
- Born: George Martin Stephen; 1949 (age 76–77)
- Employer: self employed
- Title: High Master

George Martin Stephen (born 1949) is the former High Master of St Paul's School in London until 1 January 2011. He is an author and has been described as "one of Britain's highest profile heads".

== Education ==
Stephen was educated at Uppingham School, the University of Leeds in West Yorkshire, where he obtained his BA degree, and the University of Sheffield (in South Yorkshire), where he obtained a distinction for his PhD while also working full-time at Haileybury College.

== Career ==
After working in remand homes while still a teenager, Stephen returned briefly to Uppingham as a teacher of English. For ten years at Haileybury College he also taught English, and became a housemaster. He moved for four years to be second master of Sedbergh School, then became headmaster of The Perse School, an independent school in Cambridge, then High Master of Manchester Grammar School, an independent school in Manchester. He served as chairman of The Headmasters' and Headmistresses' Conference, a group of 250 independent schools. In 2004 he moved from Manchester to St Paul's.

On 29 June 2010, he announced his decision to stand down as High Master of St Paul's in August 2011. In the days following his announcement, The Times reported that there had been an "apparent confrontation" with governors over Stephen's ability to raise funds for the school's redevelopment. This claim was rebutted by the school in a letter sent to The Times, in which the chairman of the governors stated there was "no lack of confidence in [Stephen's] fundraising abilities", but rather Stephen had chosen not to seek renewal of his contract in 2011 to allow a new head to provide continuity of oversight throughout the multimillion-pound redevelopment. Stephen had in fact led a campaign that had raised over £30m for St Paul's School, and had previously raised over £10m for bursaries at Manchester Grammar School. In November 2010, he announced that he was to take sabbatical leave from 1 January 2011 until July 2011, when his tenure as High Master was due to end. He was succeeded by Mark Bailey, who agreed to "give some of his time" to St Paul's for the first half of 2011. Stephen was the Director of Education for GEMS (UK) and Chairman of the Clarendon Academies Group.

Stephen went on to found the National Mathematics and Science College with Geoffrey Robinson which opened in 2016.

Stephen is the governor of Hartland International School-Dubai and also heads the school's “Gifted and Talented Education” program. In summer 2020 Stephen was appointed as Chair of Governors at Regent High School, Camden.

Stephen is an author of several academic titles on English literature, modern naval history and war poetry. The five Henry Gresham novels are crime thrillers set in the London and Cambridge of Elizabeth I and James I. He writes under the name of "Martin Stephen". In the early 2000s he advised author Jilly Cooper on school life during research for her novel Wicked!

== Personal life ==
Stephen suffered a stroke towards the end of 2005, and wrote about his experiences in a work titled Diary of a Stroke. He followed US research that states that if there is a clot in the brain but no bleed into the brain, the brain can be reprogrammed so that speech, writing and physical movement can return nearly to their previous levels.

== Selected works ==
- Never Such Innocence: Poems of the First World War (ISBN 978-0460873505)
- The Desperate Remedy: Henry Gresham and the Gunpowder Plot (ISBN 0316859702)
- The Galleon's Grave: Henry Gresham and the Spanish Armada (ISBN 0316726699)
- The Conscience of the King: Henry Gresham and the Shakespeare Conspiracy (ISBN 0316860026)
- Rebel Heart: Henry Gresham and the Earl of Essex (ISBN 978-0316726702)
- The Coming of the King: Henry Gresham and James I (ASIN: B00A9VPLN6)

Academic offices
Preceded by Richard Stephen Baldock	High Master of St Paul's School; 2004–2011	Succeeded by Mark Bailey
Preceded by James Geoffrey Parker	High Master of Manchester Grammar School; 1994–2004	Succeeded by Christopher Ray
Preceded by A. E. Melville	Headmaster of The Perse School; 1987–1994	Succeeded by Nigel P. V. Richardson
