= St Paul's School, London =

Independent school for boys in Barnes, Greater London, England

St Paul's School
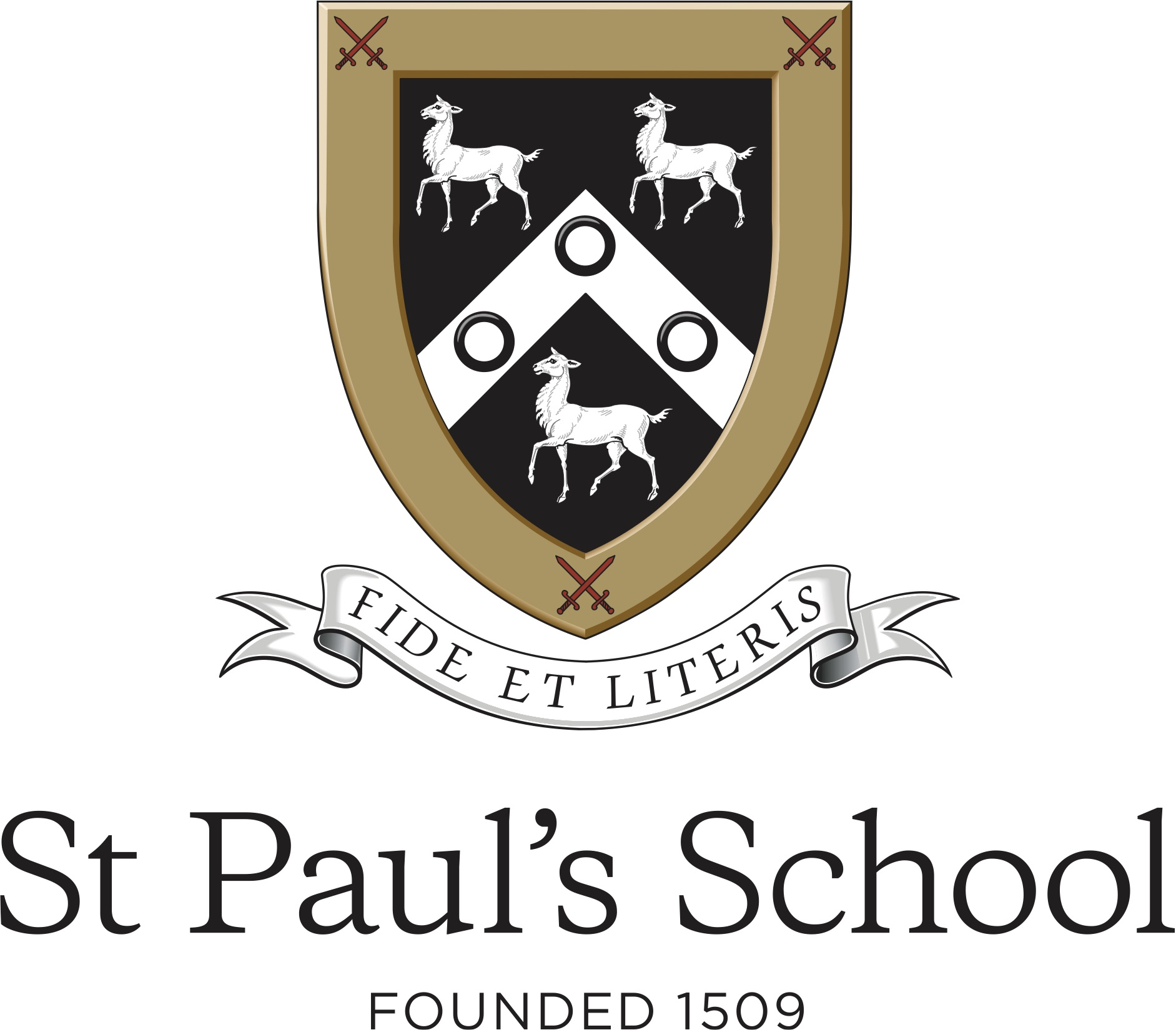

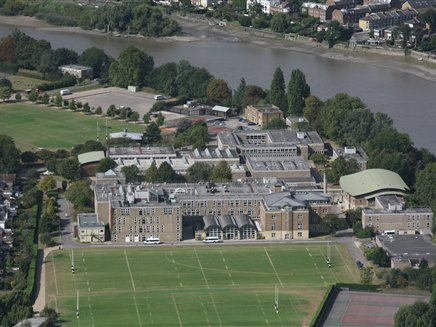
- Aerial view of St Paul's School and playing fields, 2013

Location
- Lonsdale Road; Barnes, London, SW13 9JT; United Kingdom; 51.4874°N 0.2383°W

Information
- Type: Independent school Public school
- Motto: Latin: Fide Et Literis (By Faith and By Learning)
- Religious affiliation: Church of England
- Established: 1509; 517 years ago
- Founder: John Colet
- Department for Education URN: 102942 Tables
- Chairman of the Governors: Johnny Robertson
- High Master: Sally Anne Huang
- Surmaster: Fran Clough
- Teaching staff: c. 110
- Gender: Boys
- Age: 13 to 19
- Enrolment: 1,012
- Student to teacher ratio: 9:1
- Campus size: 43-acre (0.17 km^{2})
- Campus type: Suburban
- Houses: Blurton, Cloete, Gilks, Harrison, Langley, Nilsson, Stewart, Warner (named after Undermasters)
- Budget: £50,411,000 (2025)
- Revenue: £49,100,000 (2025)
- Alumni: Old Paulines ("OPs")
- Boarding pupils: c. 30
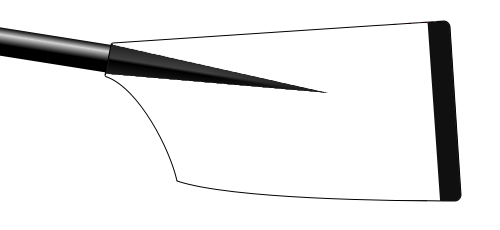
- Boat Club: St Paul's School Boat Club
- Publications: The Pauline (official school magazine); Polyglot (student-edited multilingual arts magazine); Atrium (Alumni e-magazine)
- Website: Official website

St Paul's School is a selective independent day school (with limited boarding) for boys aged 13–18, founded in 1509 by John Colet. It is located on a 43 acres (17 ha) site, beside the River Thames in Barnes, in south-west London.

St Paul's was one of nine English schools investigated by the Clarendon Commission, which subsequently became known as the Clarendon schools. However, the school successfully argued that it was a private school and consequently was omitted from the Public Schools Act 1868, as was Merchant Taylors', the other day school within the scope of Lord Clarendon's terms of reference. Since 1881, St Paul's has had its own preparatory school, St Paul's Prep School (formerly called Colet Court and then St Paul's Juniors), which since 1968 has been located on the same site.

The school has been included in The Schools Index every year since the index began in 2020 as one of the world's top 150 private schools, of which 25 are in the UK.

In 2025, St Paul's School was ranked as the number one school in the UK, according to the Sunday Times, after having been ranked number two in both 2023 and 2024, (yet being the highest ranked boys' school in both years).

== History ==
St Paul's School takes its name from St Paul's Cathedral in London. A cathedral school is recorded as early as 1103, though it had declined by the early 16th century. In 1509, John Colet, Dean of St Paul's Cathedral, established a new school on land north of the cathedral.

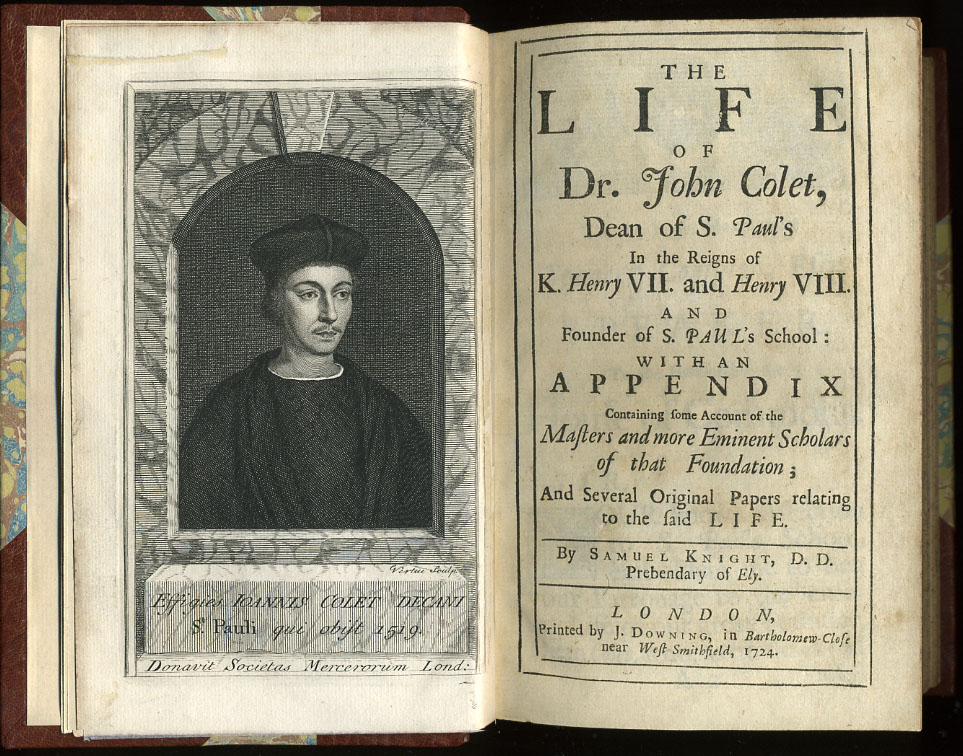
Biography of John Colet from 1724

The eldest son of Sir Henry Colet (a member of the Mercers' Company and twice Lord Mayor of the City of London), John Colet inherited a substantial fortune and used a great part of it for the endowment of his school, having no family of his own; his 21 brothers and sisters all died in childhood and he was a celibate priest. He wrote in the school's statutes that his aim was "desyring nothing more thanne Educacion and bringing upp chyldren in good Maners and litterature."

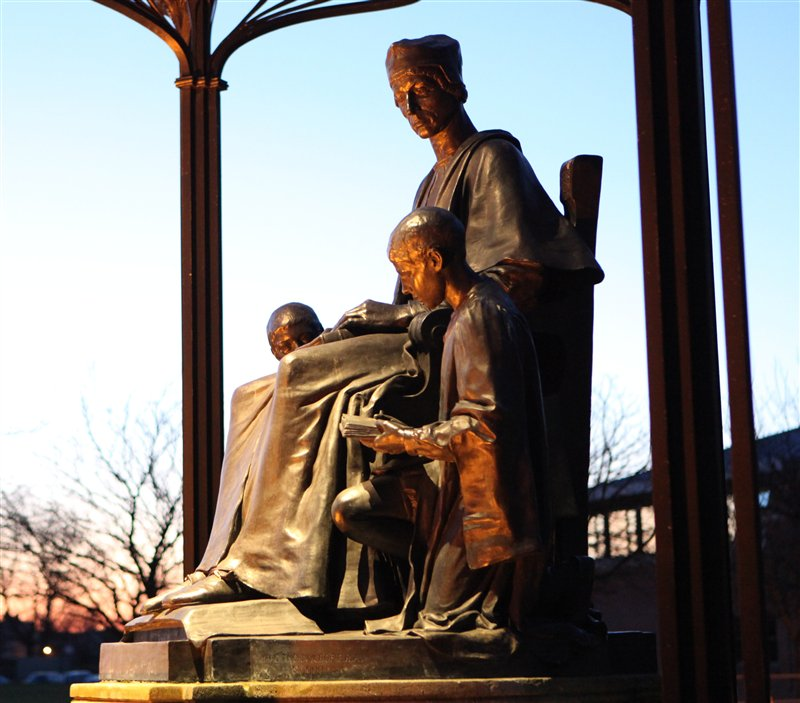
Statue of John Colet

Originally, the school admitted 153 boys of "all nacions and countries indifferently", focusing on literature and etiquette. The number 153 relates to the miraculous draught of fishes recorded in the Gospel of John; the school still awards Junior Scholars a silver-fish emblem. At its foundation, St Paul's had a High Master earning a mark per week—twice the Eton headmaster's pay. The scholars were not required to make any payment, although they were required to be literate and had to pay for their own wax candles, which at that time were an expensive commodity.

Colet was an outspoken critic of the powerful and worldly Church of his day, and a friend of both Erasmus and Sir Thomas More. Erasmus wrote textbooks for the school and St Paul's was the first English school to teach Greek, reflecting the humanist interests of the founder. Colet distrusted the Church as a managing body for his school, declaring that he "found the least corruption" in married laymen. For this reason, Colet assigned the management of the School and its revenues to the Mercers' Company, the premier livery company in the City of London, with which his father had been associated. In 1876 the company was legally established as trustee of the Colet estate, and the management of the school was assigned to a Board of Governors consisting of the Master, Wardens and nine members of the company, together with three representatives from each of the Universities of Oxford, Cambridge and London. The Mercers' Company still forms the major part of the School's governing body, and it continues to administer Colet's trust.

One of the early headmasters was Richard Mulcaster, famous for writing two influential treatises on education (Positions, in 1581, and Elementarie in 1582). His description in Positions of "footeball" as a refereed team sport is the earliest reference to organised modern football. For this description and his enthusiasm for the sport he is considered the father of modern football.

Between 1861 and 1864, the Clarendon Commission (a Royal Commission) investigated the public school system in England and its report formed the basis of the Public Schools Act 1868. St Paul's was one of only nine schools considered by the Clarendon Commission, and one of only two schools which was not predominantly attended by boarders (the other day school was Merchant Taylors').

According to Charles Dickens Jr., writing in 1879:

St Paul's School (founded 1512 by John Colet, DD, Dean of St Paul’s), St Paul's-churchyard — There are 153 scholars on the foundation, who are entitled to entire exemption from school fees. Vacancies are filled up at the commencement of each term according to the results of a competitive examination. Candidates must be between 12 and 14 years of age. Capitation scholars pay £20 a year. The governors of this school are appointed by the Mercers' Company and the Universities of Oxford, Cambridge, and London. The school exhibitions [i.e. scholarships] are determined as to number and value by the governors from time to time, and the school prizes are of considerable importance. The following are the university exhibitions. To the University of Cambridge there are the following exhibitions: Five exhibitions at Trinity, founded by Mr Perry in 1696, of the value of £10 a year; two exhibitions at St John's, founded by Dr Gower in 1711, of the value of £10 a year, for the sons of clergymen. An exhibition, founded by Mr Stock in 1780 at Corpus Christi, of the yearly value of £30, given to a scholar recommended by the high master. Four exhibitions, in the same college, value £10 a year each, founded by Mr George Sykes in 1766, consolidated now in one exhibition, value £36 a year.

=== 21st-century ===
In the early 2000s former head teacher, Martin Stephen, advised author Jilly Cooper on her novel Wicked!, which is set in an independent school.

In 2016 The Daily Telegraph reported that families earning up to £120,000 could still receive bursaries, after the headmaster remarked that fees had become "unaffordable".

=== Apposition ===
An annual ceremony known as Apposition was originally the means by which The Mercers' Company could assess and, if necessary, dismiss teachers or the High Master. The process involved a third-party "apposer" who judged teaching quality by examining final-year pupils' lectures.

Historically, the ceremony had real power. In 1559 High Master Thomas Freeman was dismissed, supposedly for lack of learning—although more probably for holding the incorrect religious views. In 1748, High Master Charles was removed after allegedly threatening to "pull the Surmaster by the nose and kick him about the school".

Since it was re-introduced in 1969, Apposition has become largely ceremonial, instead serving as a prize-giving event for boys in the final two years of the school.

== Buildings ==
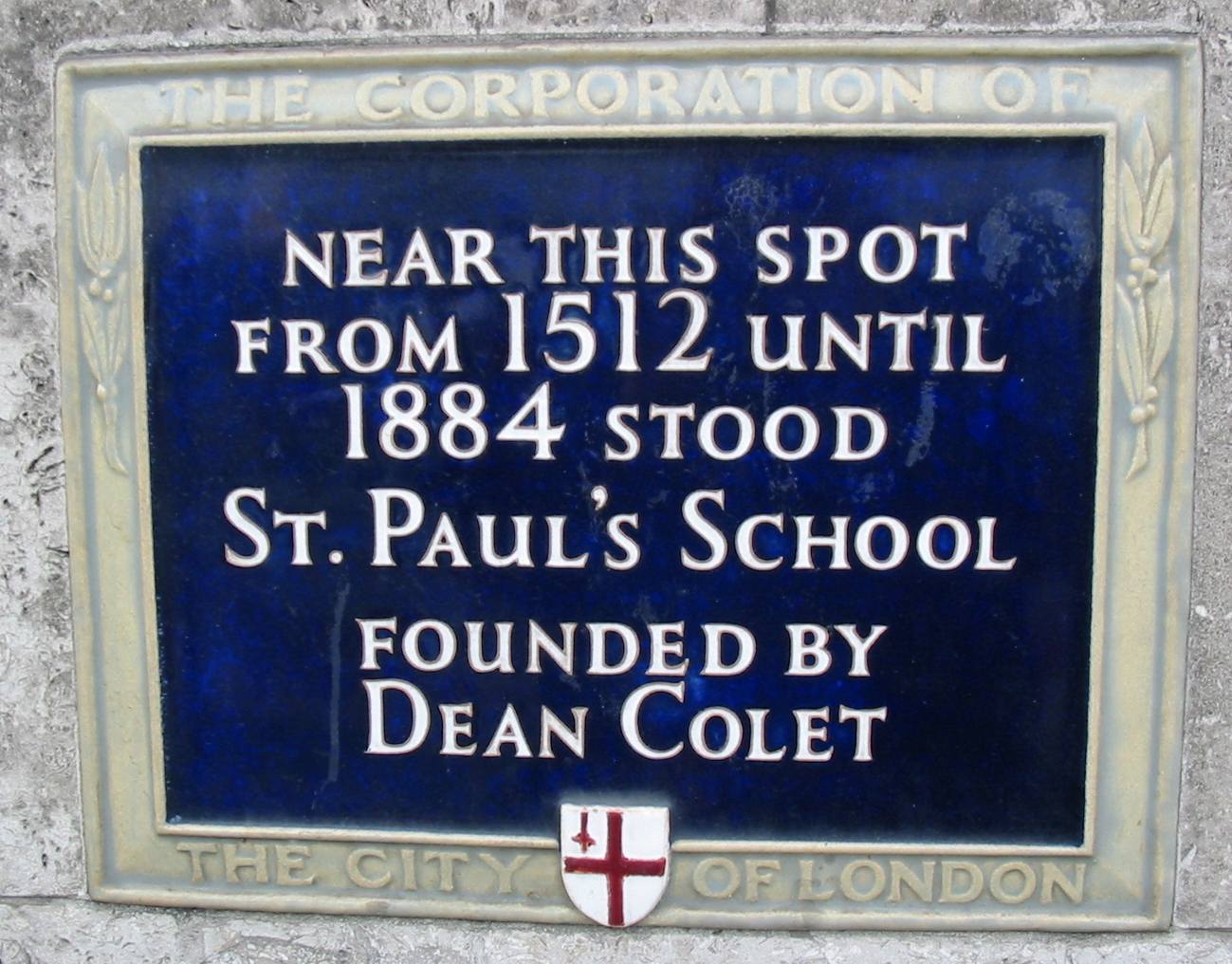
City of London blue plaque on the original site of the school

=== City of London ===
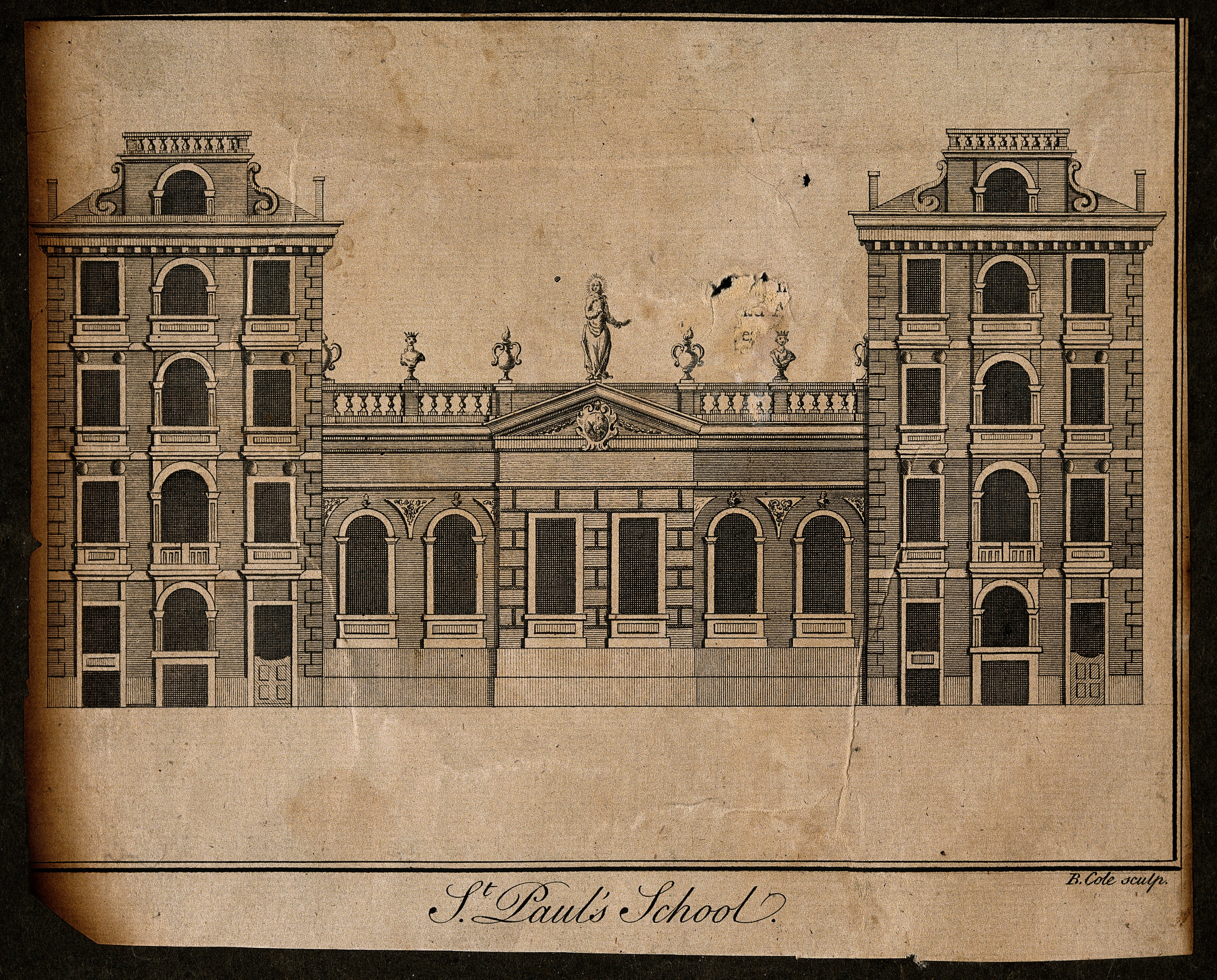
The second school in the City. Engraving by B. Cole, 1755

The original school, which stood in St Paul's Churchyard, was destroyed with the Cathedral in the Great Fire of London in 1666.

=== Hammersmith ===
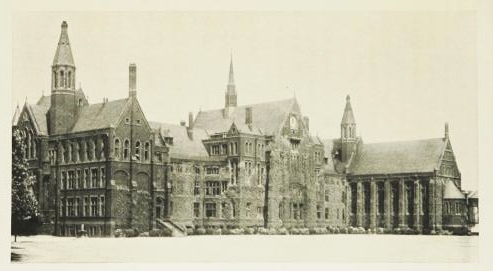
St Paul's, Hammersmith, c. 1900

In 1884 a new building designed by the architect Alfred Waterhouse rose to dominate the countryside of Hammersmith. The terracotta for the Hammersmith school was made by the famous Gibbs and Canning of Tamworth. At this time the street numbering was changed locally and so the school address, whether by accident or design, became 153 Hammersmith Road. The preparatory school, Colet Court, was soon afterwards housed in new premises in a similar style on the opposite side of the road.

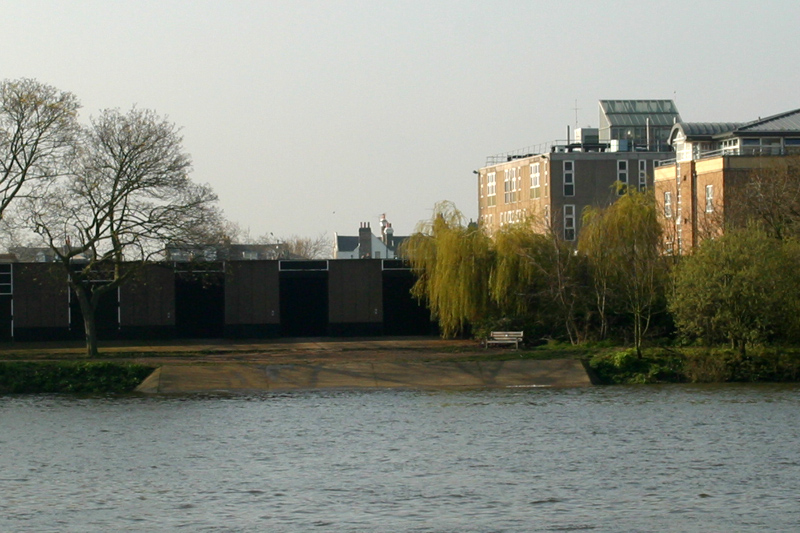
View from Hammersmith of St. Paul's current site in Barnes

In September 1939 the school was evacuated to Easthampstead Park, near Crowthorne in Berkshire, where, under the then High Master, W. F. Oakeshott, it became solely a boarding school for the period of the war. Playing fields and some other facilities were borrowed from nearby Wellington College, but the boys and the teachers from the two schools remained entirely separate.

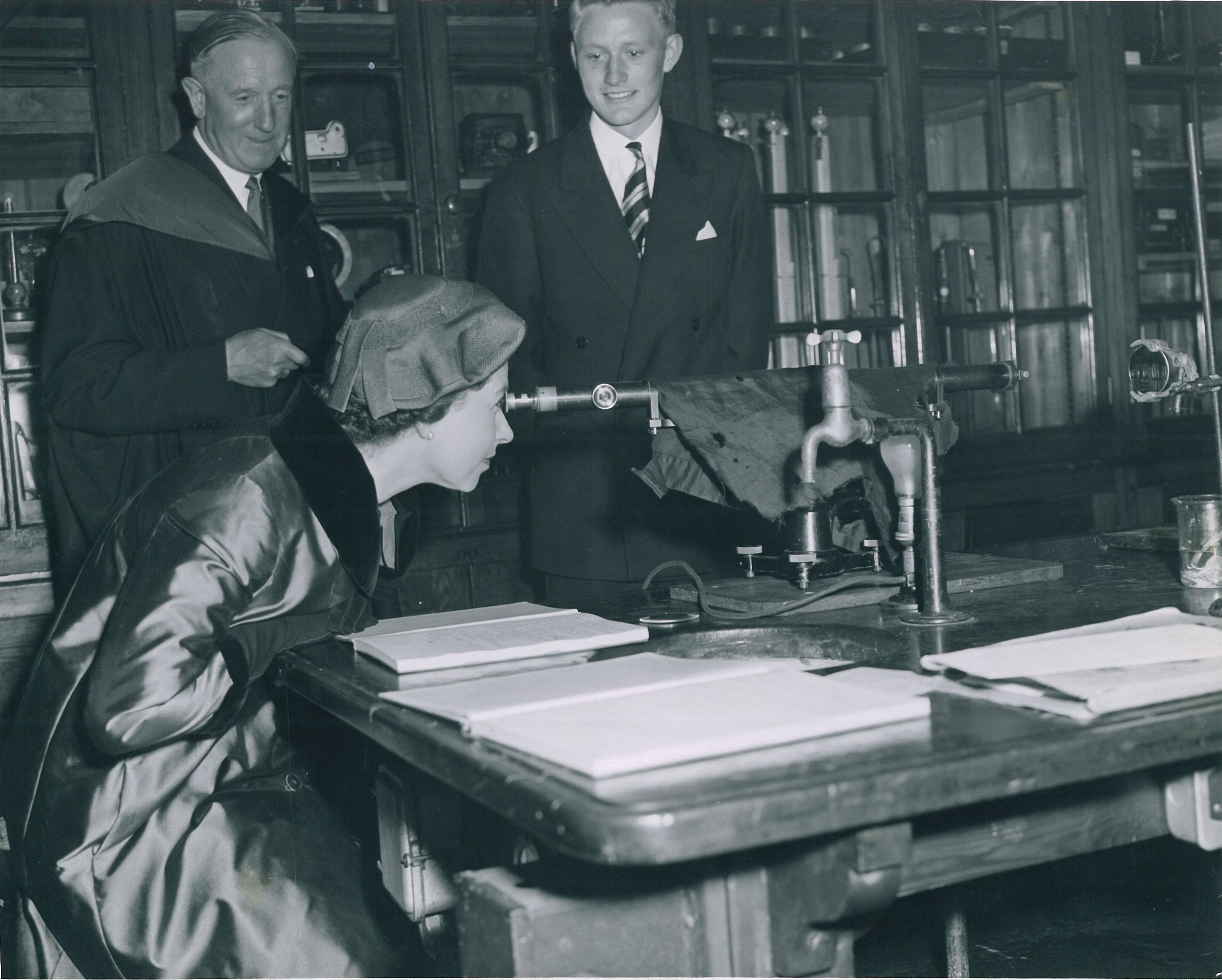
Queen Elizabeth II looking through a spectrometer in the science laboratory on her visit to the school in 1959

In the meantime, the London buildings became the headquarters of the Home Forces in July 1940 and the headquarters of the XXI Army Group under the command of General, later Field-Marshal, Bernard Montgomery, himself an Old Pauline, in July 1943. There the XXI army part of the military side of the invasion of Europe was planned, including the D-Day landings. The map that he used is still present in the modern day site of the school in the Montgomery Room. The school recovered its buildings in September 1945, and resumed life essentially as a day school, although it retains a small number of boarders to this day. In 1959, Queen Elizabeth II visited the school to mark the 450th anniversary of its founding. Upon her death, BBC journalist John Simpson, a pupil at the time, was most complimentary, saying that "we were all just bowled over by it [the visit]".

=== Barnes ===
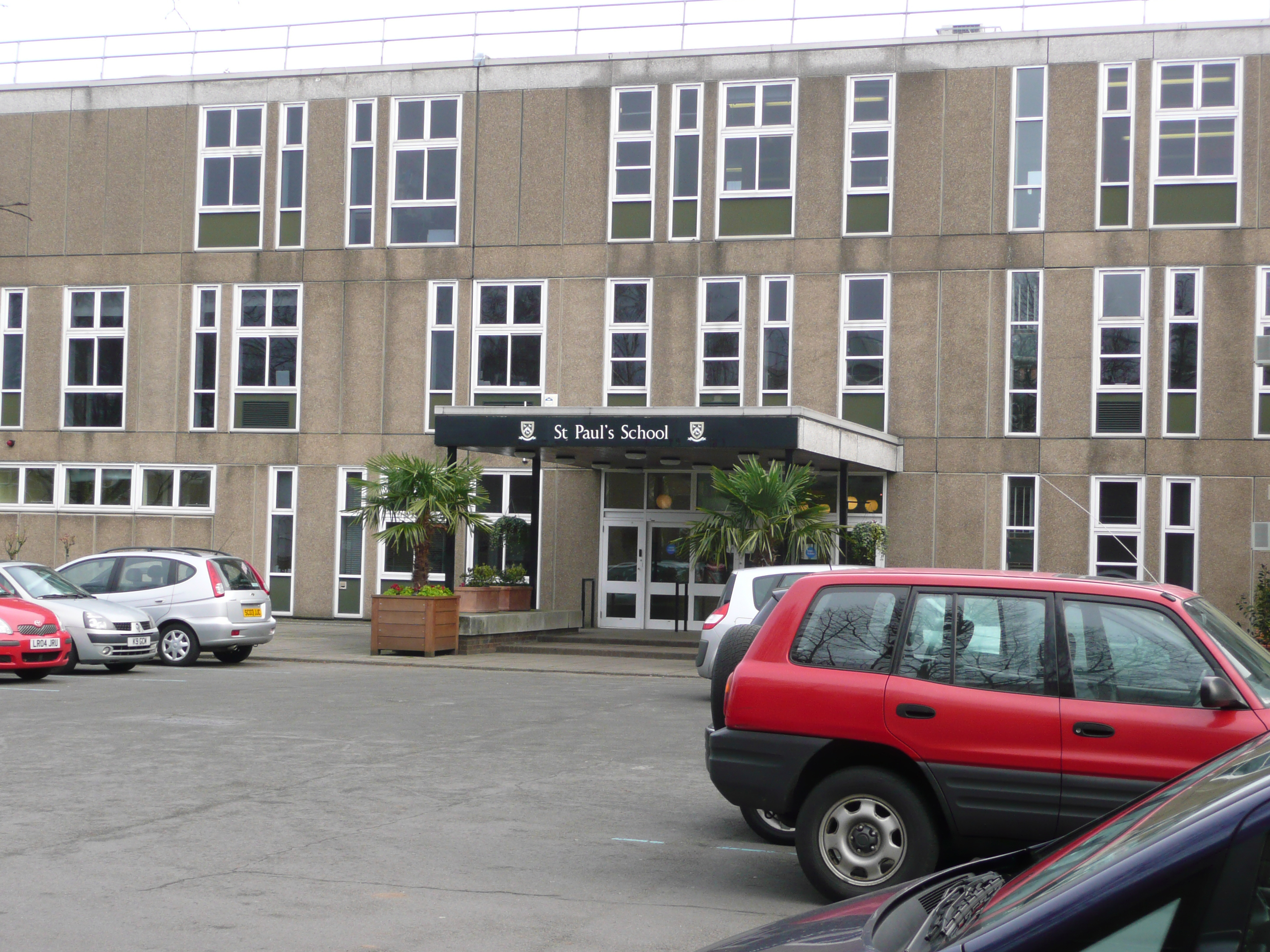
The front entrance of the now-demolished 1968 general teaching block, photographed in 2008

By 1961 it had become evident that the old school buildings were unsuited to modern educational needs. The opportunity arose to rebuild the school on a 45-acre (182,000 m²) riverside site at Barnes, adjacent to Hammersmith Bridge. This land had previously been the site of reservoirs which were filled in with earth excavated during the construction of the Victoria line.

In 1968, St Paul's School was relocated across the river to Barnes and main school buildings were demolished. Today, the boundary wall and railings, small circular Bothy (garden store), High Master's Lodge (now St Paul's Hotel) and Porter's Lodge are all that remain of the site and are Grade II listed. The main buildings were demolished and converted into St Paul's Gardens.

In the 1970s, West London College was built on 14 acres (5.7 ha) of former playing fields of St Paul's, despite campaigns opposing the development.

== 2009–present ==
In 2013, the school opened its new Science wing. The wing is a three-storey building, built to provide university-standard workspaces and labs, including its own scanning electron microscope.

=== Staff pay ===
St Paul's ranks highest on the Sunday Times Private School Pay List, with nine staff members paid salaries exceeding £100,000 in the accounting period 2019-20. St Paul’s also had the highest individual earner, with one staff member earning between £330,000 and £339,000 from September 2019 to August 2020.

=== Operation Winthorpe ===
St Paul's has been investigated by the Metropolitan Police for historic crimes of paedophilia so serious the investigation was given its own operational name, Operation Winthorpe. Since then school has reviewed and revised its safeguarding procedures. A major independent report published in January 2020, revealed 80 complaints against 32 members of staff over a period of six decades, mainly from the 1960s to the 1990s. There were 28 recommendations on how current practice could be improved.

=== Renewal campaign ===
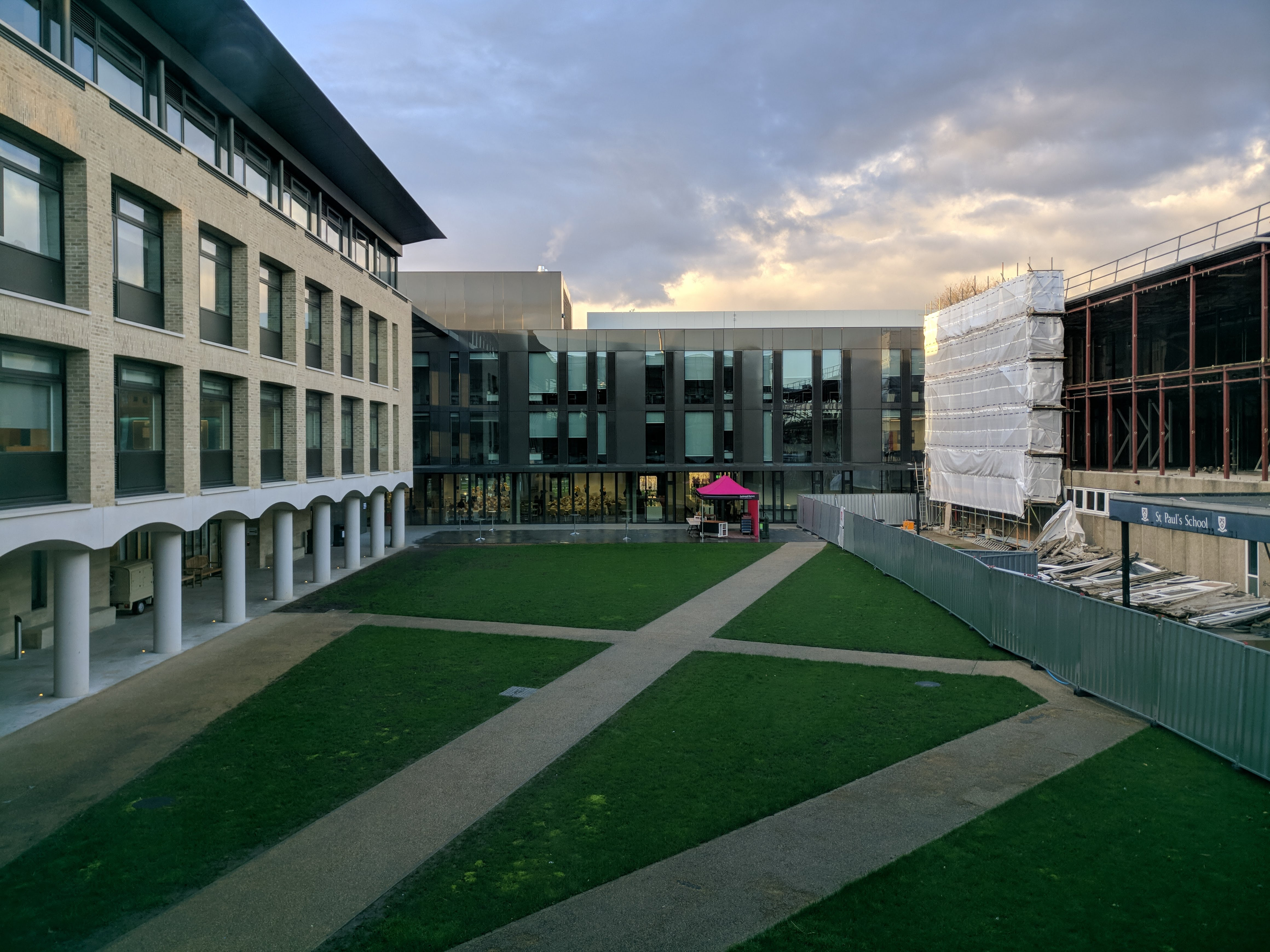
On the left, the new science block is visible; in the centre is the first phase of the new general teaching block (GTB) building; on the right is visible the old half-demolished GTB and the former main entrance.

The renewal campaign is the project to rebuild the entire school campus, frequently known as the Masterplan.

The majority of the Barnes site buildings date from the 1960s, and the CLASP technology used in the construction of the buildings had a limited lifespan. Even though various buildings (such as the Wathen Hall Music School, Rackets Court and Milton Building) had been added to the campus over the years, the 1960s prefab buildings represented approximately three-quarters of the school.

Local planning restrictions combined with a lack of available surplus land mean that St Paul's is faced with progressively replacing obsolete buildings with new ones located in the same general area. The plan should eventually result in a large building footprint area increase as well as increasing the amount of staff housing.

In 2007, Nicholas Hare Architects were appointed to produce detailed designs for the first set of new buildings. Late in 2009, Richmond Council granted St Paul's detailed planning permission, and building started in 2011.

In 2023, the St Paul's Juniors building was demolished to make way for a completely new junior school designed by Hawkins\Brown, due to be completed in 2026.

== Sport ==
=== Rugby ===
St Paul's was one of the 21 principal founding members of the Rugby Football Union in 1871, of which only ten remain to this day.

In 1979, the St Paul's 1st XV, nicknamed the 'Invincibles', went twelve matches undefeated.

In 2005 and 2007, St Paul's reached the final of the U15 Daily Mail Cup, the premier rugby union tournament for British secondary schools. In 2005, they lost 12-7 to St Benedict's School, Ealing, and in 2007 they lost 20-15 to Lymm High School.

In 2017, St Paul's reached the final of the first-ever U15 Plate competition, losing 6-3 to Sir Thomas Rich's School.

In 2025, St Paul's won the U15 Continental Tyres School Vase at Ealing Trailfinders Rugby Club, beating Bishop's Stortford High School 32-3 in the final.

In 2025, the U16A and U14A rugby teams both finished the season with perfect undefeated records.

=== Rowing ===
St Paul's School Boat Club (SPSBC) has won the Princess Elizabeth Challenge Cup at Henley Royal Regatta nine times and has held the course record since 2018.

In 2017/18 and again in 2023/24, SPSBC won "the Quadruple" of the most prestigious youth eights events, consisting of the Head of the Charles, Schools' Head of the River, National Schools' Regatta and the HRR Princess Elizabeth Challenge Cup. From 2023 to 2025, St Paul's won six of these titles in succession. In 2026, SPSBC won the Head of the Charles Regatta Youth Eights for the fourth year in a row, narrowly missing out on the course record after receiving a penalty of five seconds. The 2017 crew still holds the course record, in a time of 14:12.127.

Between 2015 and 2026, St Paul's featured in the final of the Princess Elizabeth Challenge Cup eight times (out of eleven), winning five.

In May 2025, Junior Rowing News described St Paul's School Boat Club as "arguably the standout junior rowing program in the world over the past few years."

=== Football ===
St Paul's School has had one professional football player, Richard Nartey.

In March 2025, St Paul's reached the final of the ISFA Shield, losing 2-1 to Bromsgrove School.

== Examinations ==
In 2023 and again in 2024, St Paul's School ranked as the top boys' school in the UK in the Sunday Times Parent Power league table for academic performance, and second overall behind only St Paul's Girls' School on both occasions. In 2025, St Paul's School managed to go one better and top the league table and was awarded 'Independent Secondary School of the Year for Academic Excellence 2026'.

In 2024, 23% of 175 university leavers went on to Oxford or Cambridge, and a further 13% went to study in the United States at Ivy League or equivalent institutions, including Harvard, Yale, and Stanford. The record for Oxford and Cambridge places was 42%, achieved in 2010.

GCSE summary: last five years

YEAR	8/9	7/8/9	6/7/8/9
2024	92%	97.8%	99.6%
2023	87%	96%	99%
2022	94%	99%	100%
2021*	94%	98%	100%
2020*	92%	99%	100%

A level summary: last five years

YEAR	A*	A*A	A*AB
2024	61%	90%	98%
2023	51%	85%	97%
2022	70%	96%	99%
2021	77%	95%	99%
2020	51%	83%	95%

== High Masters ==
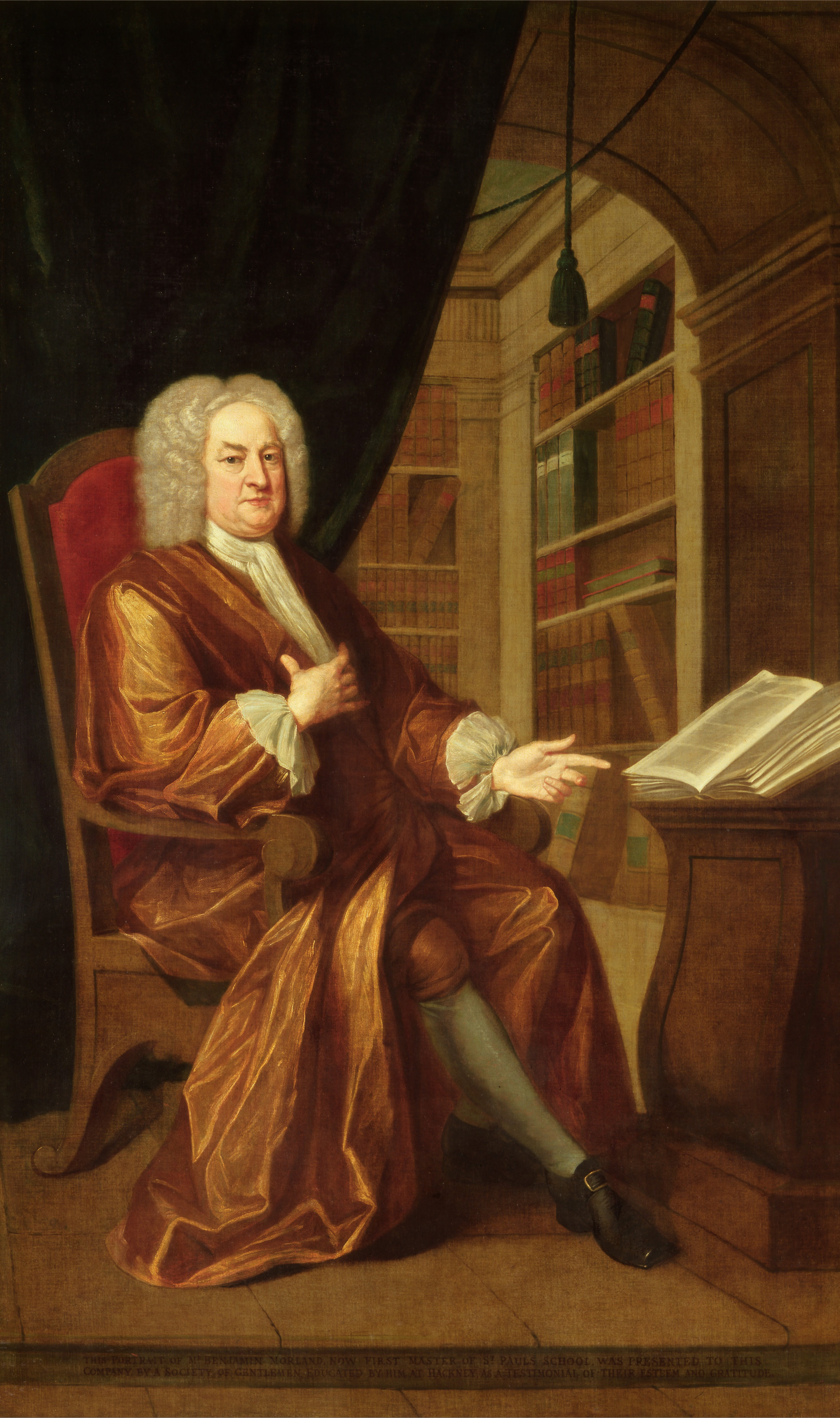
1724 portrait of Benjamin Moreland, High Master from 1721 to 1733

The head teacher of St Paul's is known as the High Master, and the deputy head as the Surmaster. These titles are assigned in the school statutes. The following have been High Masters of St Paul's:

Name	Years as High Master
William Lily	1509–1522
John Ritwise	1522–1532
Richard Jones	1532–1549
Thomas Freeman	1549–1559
John Cook	1559–1573
William Malym	1573–1581
John Harrison	1581–1596
Richard Mulcaster	1596–1608
Alexander Gill Senior	1608–1635
Alexander Gill Junior	1635–1640
John Langley	1640–1657
Samuel Cromleholme /ˈkrʌm.ləm/	1657–1672
Thomas Gale	1672–1697
John Postlethwayt	1697–1713
Philip Ayscough /ˈæsˌkjuː/	1713–1721
Benjamin Moreland	1721–1733
Timothy Crumpe	1733–1737
George Charles	1737–1748
George Thicknesse	1748–1769
Richard Roberts	1769–1814
John Sleath	1814–1837
Herbert Kynaston	1838–1876
Frederick William Walker	1877–1905
Albert Ernest Hillard	1905–1927
John Bell	1927–1938
Walter Fraser Oakeshott	1938–1946
Robert Leoline James	1946–1953
Antony Newcombe Gilkes	1953–1962
Thomas Edward Brodie Howarth	1962–1973
James Warwick Hele	1973–1986
Peter Pilkington, later Lord Pilkington of Oxenford	1986–1992
Richard Stephen Baldock	1992–2004
George Martin Stephen	2004–2010
Mark Bailey	2011–2020
Sally-Anne Huang	2020–

=== Other notable staff ===
- Nigel Briers (born 1955), former cricketer
- Fran Clough (born 1962), former rugby player, played for England in the 1987 world cup
- Josh Hawley (born 1979), U.S. senator
- George Green Loane (1865–1945), housemaster, classical scholar
- Francis Sowerby Macaulay (1862–1937), mathematician

== See also ==
- St Paul's Girls' School

== Bibliography ==
- Bussey, David (2009). John Colet's Children: the boys of St. Paul's School in later life (1509–2009). Oxford: Gresham Books. ISBN 9780946095568.
- McDonnell, Michael F. J. (1909). A History of St Paul's School. London: Chapman and Hall.
- Mead, A. H. (1990). A Miraculous Draught of Fishes: a history of St Paul's School. London: James & James. ISBN 0-907383-05-X.
- Newbold, David John (1988), British Planning and Preparations to Resist Invasion on Land, September 1939 – September 1940, unpublished PhD thesis, King's College, University of London
- Picciotto, Cyril (1939). St Paul's School. London: Blackie & Son.
- Richards, A. N. G. (1968). St Paul's School in West Kensington, 1884–1968: a brief account of the buildings and site. London.
