= William Dunkin (judge) =

Irish lawyer, and judge in India

- Died: 1807
- Occupations: Barrister; judge

Sir William Dunkin (died 1807) was an Irish barrister and judge in Bengal.

== Life ==
Dunkin was admitted to the Middle Temple in 1753, as the eldest son of John Dunkin of Bushfoot, County Antrim. He was later described as being from Clogher, County Antrim. He served as High Sheriff of Antrim in 1777. Although he had inherited an estate, he encumbered it with debt, and went to Calcutta to practise as a barrister.

In October 1781, Dunkin was mentioned as on the way to India in a letter from Edmund Burke to Lord George Macartney, two of his friends. There he was a friend of William Hickey. He lived a bachelor life, sharing accommodation with Stephen Cassan, another Irish barrister. In 1788, he set off to go to England in search of a judicial appointment in Calcutta, sailing to Europe in December on the Phoenix under Captain Gray.

Dunkin returned to Bengal aboard the Phoenix in August 1791. He had been appointed to the Supreme Court of Judicature at Fort William and was knighted in March of that year. The appointment was later attributed to the influence of Henry Dundas. Dunkin had in fact obtained a reluctant support for it from Lord Thurlow. His senior colleague on the court, Robert Chambers, did not welcome it, regarding Dunkin as suspect; further Dunkin and Hickey were allies in opposition to Chambers. Hickey's accounts of Chambers in his memoirs, in relation to Dunkin on the court, have been called partisan and misleading, in particular in relation to a bazaar case where John Hyde was brought from his sickbed in 1796 as a supporting vote by Chambers against Dunkin.

Dunkin resigned from the post in 1797, being replaced by John Royds. He had a house in Portman Square, London, where Thomas Reynolds knew him as one of a set of wealthy returnees from India; and died at The Polygon, Southampton in 1807.

== Works ==
When Sir William Jones died in 1794, Dunkin wrote a Latin epitaph, used on his tomb in Calcutta. An English paraphrase was later made by Eyles Irwin.

== Family ==
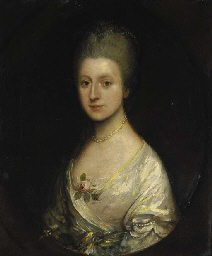
Elizabeth Blacker (1739–1822), wife of William Dunkin, portrait by Thomas Gainsborough

Dunkin married Elizabeth or Eliza Blacker (1739–1822), daughter of William Blacker (1709–1783), in 1764. Their eldest daughter Letitia married Sir Francis Workman Macnaghten, having a large family, among them William Hay Macnaghten. When Dunkin clashed with William Burroughs, attorney-general in Bengal from 1792, Francis Macnaghten tried to challenge Burroughs to a duel, and then to have him disbarred. Through the marriage, the Macnaghtens acquired the Dunkin family house at Bushmills.

Of Dunkin's other children, his daughter Jane married Richard William Wake, son of Sir William Wake, 8th Baronet, and his daughter Rachel married John Bladen Taylor, the Member of Parliament for Hythe, as her second husband, the first being George Elliott of Bengal. The youngest daughter, Matilda, married Valentine Conolly, son of William Conolly.

Hickey mentions two sons. One, Edward, came to Bengal with his father in 1791, in his late teens but suffered from fits. According to Hickey, he returned to Europe and died young. He also makes Captain John Dunkin (John Henry Dunkin) of the 8th Light Dragoons a brother of Letitia.
