= Peckwell =

Peckwell is a surname. Notable people with the surname include:

- Henry Peckwell (1747–1787), Church of England cleric of Methodist views
- H. W. Peckwell (1852–1936), American artist
- Robert Henry Peckwell, later Robert Henry Blosset (1776–1823), English lawyer and Chief Justice of Bengal
