= Stephen Cassan =

Stephen Cassan may refer to:

- Stephen Hyde Cassan (1789–1841), English Anglican priest and ecclesiastical biographer
- Stephen Cassan (barrister) (1758–1794), Irish barrister in Calcutta
