= Sir Francis Workman-Macnaghten, 1st Baronet =

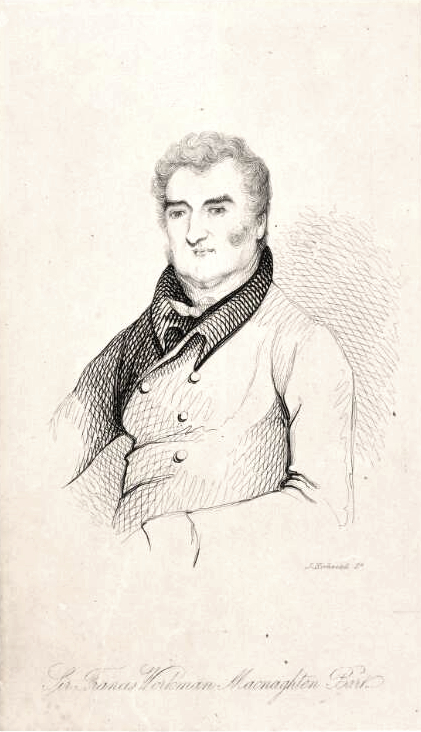
Sir Francis Workman-Macnaghten, 1st Baronet

Sir Francis Workman-Macnaghten, 1st Baronet (1763–1843) was an Anglo-Irish judge in India.

== Early life ==
He was the son of Edmund MacNaghten of Beardiville, County Antrim, and his second wife Hannah Johnstone of Belfast, and younger brother of Edmond Alexander MacNaghten, Member of Parliament for County Antrim and Orford. He was also a first cousin of Half Hung MacNaghten.

Macnaghten was admitted to Lincoln's Inn in 1784.

== In India ==
Macnaghten sailed to India in 1791 on the Lord Camden with his wife and two small children. He was appointed a barrister of the Supreme Court of Judicature at Fort William that year. William Hickey, who knew him socially, wrote

[Macnaghten] was a fine, high-spirited, honourable young man: by nature of a violent temper, but he possessed sufficient resolution not only to curb, but in great measure to correct the infirmity [...]

Macnaghten became Sheriff of Fort William in 1797, and took on Hickey as his deputy. At this period, Hickey resolved a quarrel between Macnaghten and William Burroughs.

Dissatisfied with Calcutta, Macnaghten and his family returned to the United Kingdom on the Charlton, leaving at the end of 1803. In 1809 he was appointed a justice of the Supreme Court of Madras, and was knighted.

Macnaghten changed his name in 1823, adding Workman to his surname, after a cousin Caroline Workman who died unmarried; This change was a condition placed on a legacy, the estate of Mahan, County Armagh. He retired from the Indian Bench in 1825. It came after his seniority had been disregarded in the appointment as Chief Justice of Calcutta of Charles Edward Grey.

== Later life ==
Returning to Ireland, Workman-Macnaghten initially resided at Roe Park. He had a castellated house built at Dunderave, near Bushmills, County Antrim, c.1837. The 2nd Baronet demolished it and in 1847 had an Italianate house built, Dundarave House designed by Charles Lanyon.

Workman-Macnaghten built schools at Bushmills and Ballyworkan, Drumcree (County Armagh) and a courthouse at Bushmills. Adding also a hotel, twice-weekly market and corn store, he is considered to have launched the economic growth of Bushmills in the 1820s.

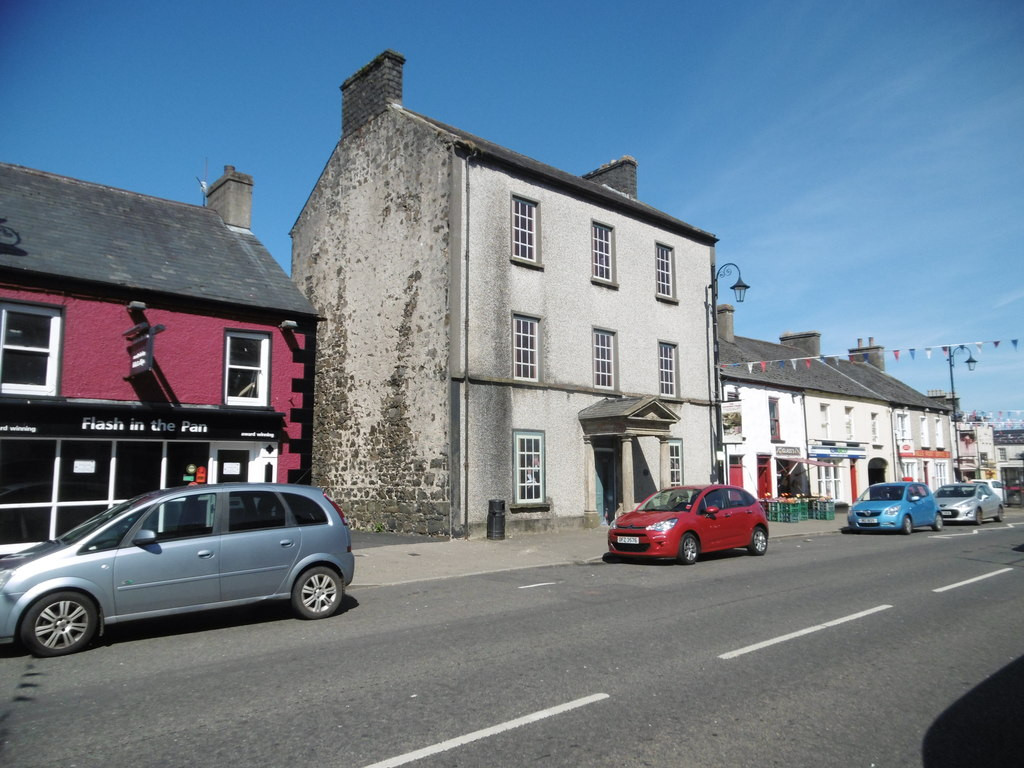
Old Courthouse, Bushmills, 2018 photograph

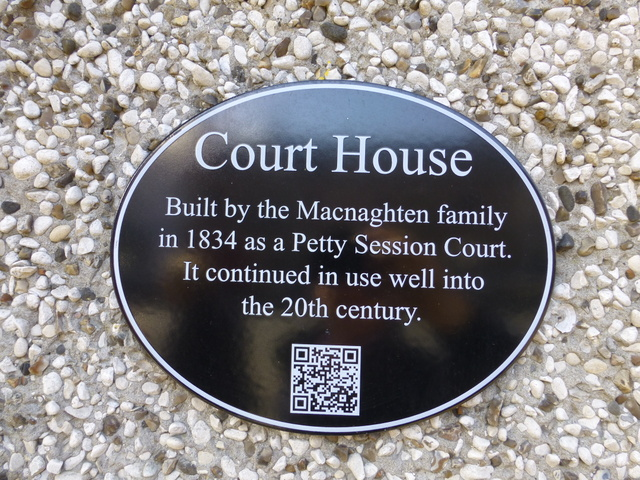
Plaque, Old Courthouse, Bushmills

== Works ==
- Considerations on the Hindoo Law, as it is Current in Bengal (1824). Its Preface was critical of Jagannath Tarka Panchanan and his work for Sir William Jones in compiling Vivadabhangarnava. Thomas Babington Macaulay in an 1833 speech used Macnaghten as an authority: "Sir Francis Macnaghten tells us, that it is a delusion to fancy that there is any known and fixed law under which the Hindoo people live; that texts may be produced on any side of any question; that expositors equal in authority perpetually contradict each other: that the obsolete law is perpetually confounded with the law actually in force; and that the first lesson to be impressed on a functionary who has to administer Hindoo law is that it is vain to think of extracting certainty from the books of the jurist." J. Duncan M. Derrett criticised both Workman-Macnaghten and his son's works, and that of Thomas Andrew Lumisden Strange on the same area, as "too brief"; and in particular considered the former "vitiated by the Bengal school of thought". Where Macnaghten emphasised the usefulness of "factum valet" (the Latin tag quod fieri non debet factum valet or the fact cannot be altered despite circumstances), Derrett argues that Macnaghten erred in that this attitude may have been significant in the Bengal school of interpretation of Sanskrit legal authorities, but other schools of Hindu law took opposing views.
- A View of the Catholic Question as it Relates to Ireland (1828), a pamphlet in favour of Catholic relief, at a time when his politician brother Edmond opposed it.
- Poor Laws—Ireland: Observations Upon the Report of George Nicholls (1838)

== Family ==
Macnaghten married Letitia Dunkin, daughter of William Dunkin and Eliza Blacker; they had six sons and 11 daughters. The two eldest children returned from Bengal, sailing at the end of 1795 with Letitia's widowed sister Rachel Elliot. Of the children:

- Their daughter Caroline married in 1824 Alfred Chapman, fifth son of Abel Chapman of Whitby. They met on board the Woodford of which Chapman, a sea captain, was the master, on a voyage.
- Eliza Serena, married in 1813 Major-General Robert Sewell and was mother of Francis Hill Sewell.
- Maria (died 1881), sixth daughter, married in 1822 Thomas Robarts Thellusson, son of Charles Thellusson.
- Alicia (died 1864) married in 1826 Captain George Probyn, of the Bombay Marine. Dighton Probyn VC was their son.
- The eldest son Edmund Charles Workman-Macnachten (1790–1876) was Member of Parliament for Antrim.
- William Hay Macnaghten (1793–1841), second son, was born at Fort William. He worked as a court official and diplomat, writing on Hindu law as his father had, and was killed in the First Anglo-Afghan War.
- Elliot Macnaghten (1807–1888), fourth son, was chairman of the East India Company in 1855.

== Legacy ==
His unmarried brother Edmond put the position of clan chief of Clan MacNaghten on a legal basis with a patent in 1818. On his death in 1832, Workman-Macnaghten became chief, and it became hereditary in the baronetcy.
