= Henry Peckwell =

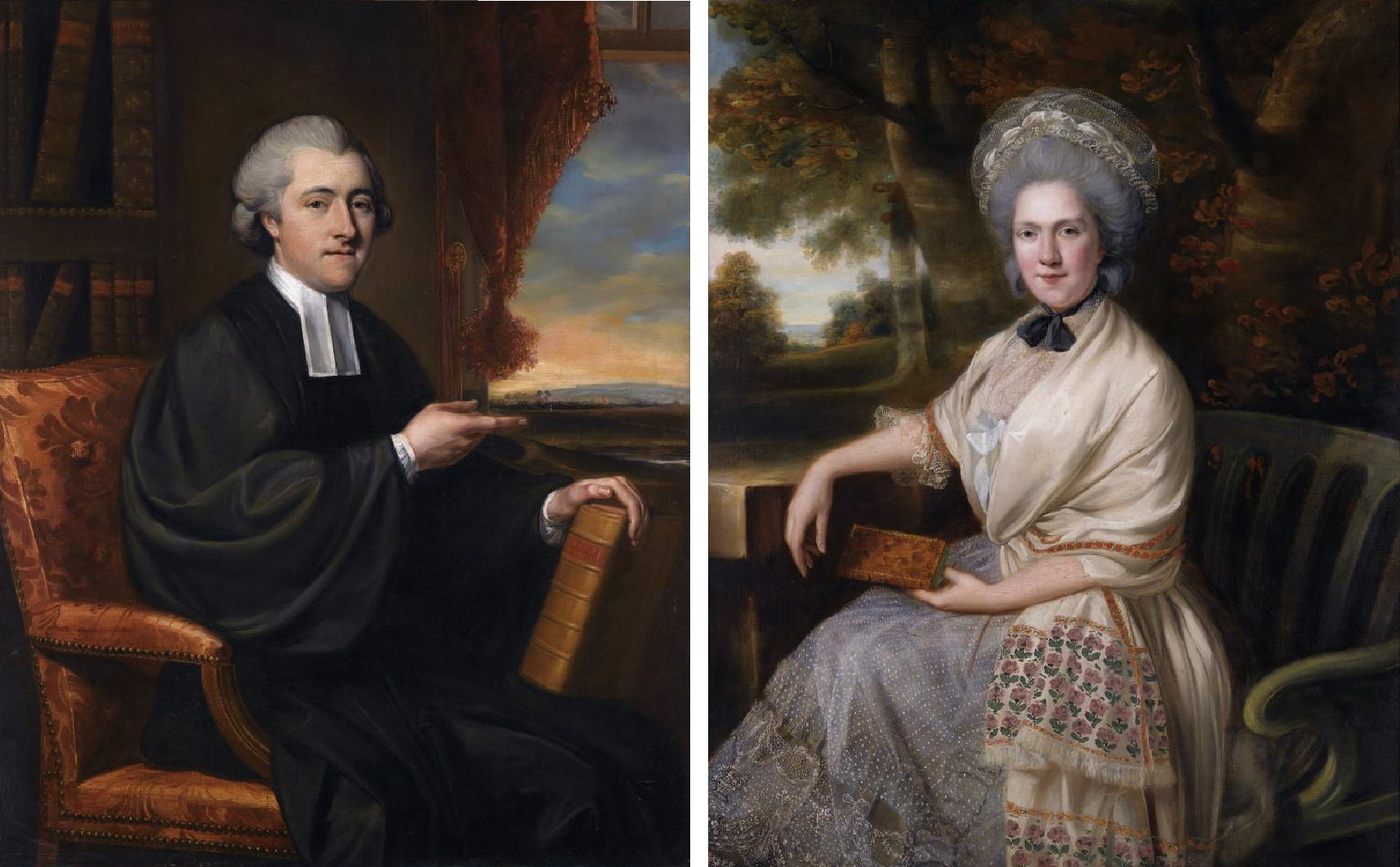
Henry Peckwell and his wife Isabella Blosset (John Russell)

Henry Peckwell (1747–1787) was a Church of England clergyman of Methodist views.

== Life ==
He was the son of Henry Peckwell of Chichester. About 1764 he entered the house of an Italian silk merchant in London, with the intention of representing the firm in Italy. But he spent more of his time at George Whitefield's Tabernacle than in the counting-house, and before his term was finished he gave up his position and matriculated at St Edmund Hall, Oxford, on 17 May 1770.

Peckwell attracted the notice of Selina Hastings, Countess of Huntingdon, who made him one of her chaplains. In April 1774 the chapel in Prince's Street, Westminster, was repaired by her and opened for him. In the same year he preached the anniversary sermon at Lady Huntingdon's College at Trevecca, and later visited many places in England, preaching for the Connexion. Subsequently he was presented by Lord Robert Manners to the rectory of Bloxholm-cum-Digby in Lincolnshire, which he retained till his death.

He visited Dublin around 1783, and drew large congregations in the city. Through the influence of Elizabeth Rawdon, Countess of Moira, Lady Huntingdon's eldest daughter, he was permitted to preach in the chapel of the Magdalen Institution, founded by Lady Arabella Denny, a fashionable congregation. Here he spoke out too plainly, and complaints were made. The aftermath created a breach between Lady Arabella and the Countess of Moira, and application was made to the Archbishop of Dublin to use his influence to arrest the spread of Methodism.

Residing in London, he founded in 1784 an institution called ‘The Sick Man's Friend,’ for the purpose of relieving the sick poor of all denominations, as well as supplying instruction. To render himself of greater service to the work, he studied medicine. He died from the effects of a wound in his hand, inflicted upon himself while making a post-mortem examination, on 18 August 1787, at his house in St James's, Westminster. He was buried in the family vault at Chichester.

In its obituary, The Times described the infection which caused his death:

"When the body was to be sewed up, Doctor Peckwell held the parts together, the surgeon ran the needle into his hand, which introduced some of the virus matter, or, in other words, inoculated him with putridity." (In those days, a virus was not yet determined. The word meant poison or other noxious liquids)

Peckwell published, besides sermons, A Collection of Psalms and Hymns, London, 1760?

== Family ==
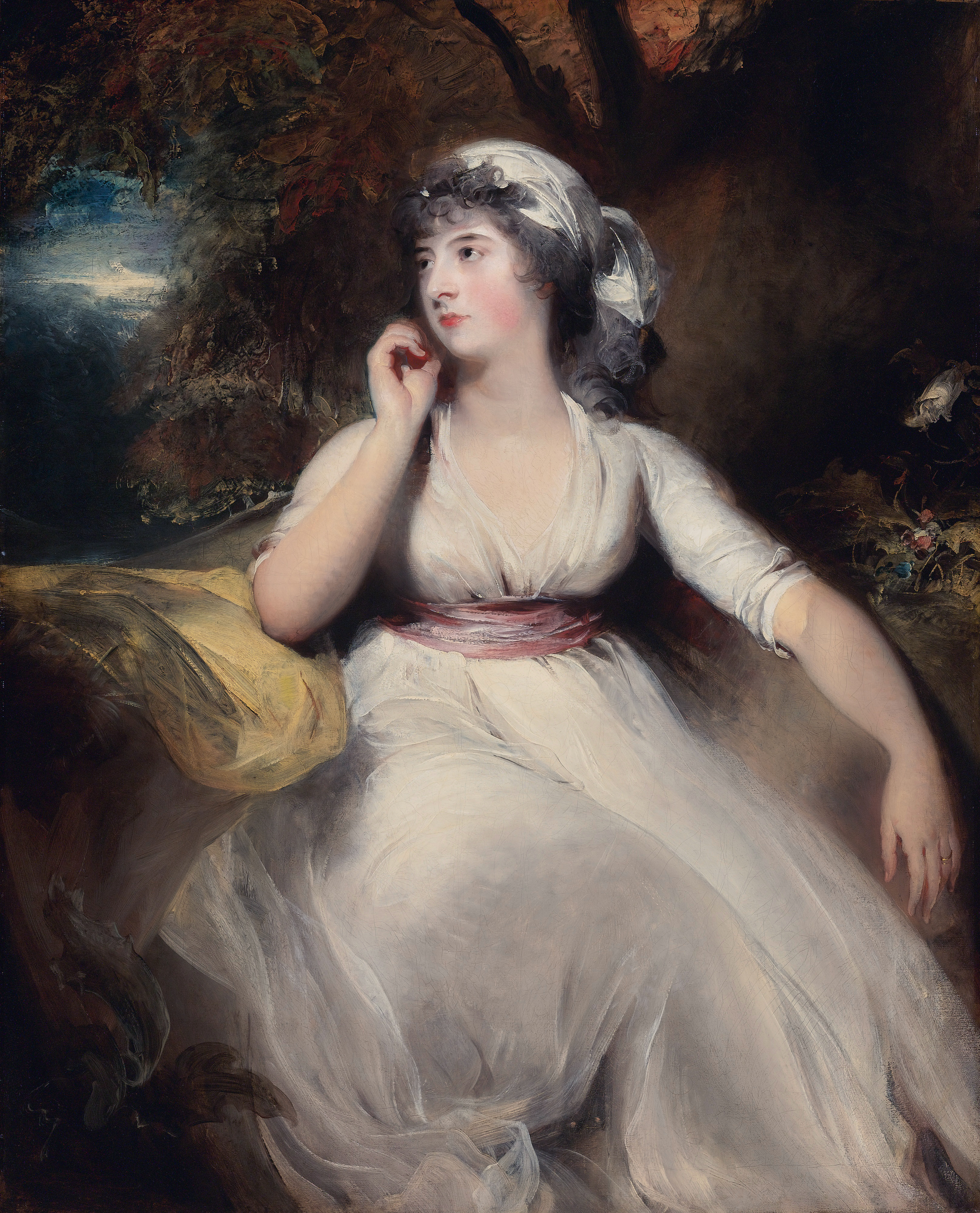
His daughter Selina by Thomas Lawrence (1793)

Peckwell married, on 23 February 1773, Bella Blossed or Blosset of County Meath. By her he had a son, Robert Henry, and a daughter, Selina Mary (named after her godmother, the Countess of Huntingdon). Robert Henry adopted the surname Blosset and became Chief Justice of Bengal. Selina, in 1793, married George Grote, the banker, and became the mother of George Grote and Arthur Grote. His widow died in her house in Wilmot Street, Brunswick Square, on 28 November 1816.

== Notes ==
Attribution

This article incorporates text from a publication now in the public domain: "Peckwell, Henry". Dictionary of National Biography. London: Smith, Elder & Co. 1885–1900.
