= Stephen Caesar Le Maistre =

Puisne judge of the Supreme Court of Judicature at Fort William in Bengal
- In office 22 October 1774 – 4 November 1777

Stephen Caesar Le Maistre was a puisne judge of the Supreme Court of Judicature at Fort William. Along with Justice Hyde and to some extent Impey, he argued for greatly expanding the powers of the Supreme Court. He died on 4 November 1777.
