= Ernest Cassan =

English cricketer

Personal information
- Full name: Ernest John Plantagenet Cassan
- Born: 17 October 1835; Bruton, Somerset, England
- Died: 24 December 1904 (aged 69); Bath, Somerset, England
- Batting: Unknown
- Bowling: Unknown

Domestic team information
- Years: Team
- 1859: Oxford University

Career statistics
Competition	First-class
Matches	2
Runs scored	8
Batting average	2.66
100s/50s	–/–
Top score	4
Balls bowled	436
Wickets	16
Bowling average	11.00
5 wickets in innings	1
10 wickets in match	–
Best bowling	5/64
Catches/stumpings	–/–
- Source: Cricinfo, 10 February 2020

Ernest John Plantagenet Cassan (17 October 1835 – 24 December 1904) was an English first-class cricketer.

The son of Stephen Hyde Cassan, he was born in October 1835 at Bruton, Somerset where he attended King's School. From there he went up to Magdalen College, Oxford. While studying at Oxford, he made two appearances in first-class cricket for Oxford University in 1859, against the Marylebone Cricket Club at Oxford and Cambridge University in The University Match at Lord's. He fared well with the ball in these matches, taking 16 wickets at an average of 11.00, with one five wicket haul of 5 for 64 against Cambridge. His endeavours earned him a cricket blue.

After graduating from Oxford, Cassan trained to become a barrister, though he never practiced due to his cricketing commitments. He was strongly associated with cricket in the West Country, where he played as an amateur for Dorset, Incogniti, Lansdown, and the Gentlemen of Somerset. He founded the latter with fellow West Country cricket enthusiasts in 1860, with the team later evolving into Somerset County Cricket Club in 1875. Away from his cricketing commitments, he served as a governor for King's School, Bruton from 1876–8. Cassan committed suicide by shooting himself in the head on Christmas Eve in 1904.
