= Gaston-Laurent Coeurdoux =

French Indianist and missionary

- Gaston-Laurent Cœurdoux
- Born: December 18, 1691; Bourges, France
- Died: June 15, 1779 (aged 87); Pondicherry, French India
- Occupations: Missionary, linguist

Gaston-Laurent Coeurdoux (/kʊərˈduː/; sometimes Cœurdoux; French: Cœurdoux [kœʁdu]; 18 December 1691, Bourges, France – 15 June 1779, Pondicherry, French India) was a French Jesuit missionary in South India and a noteworthy Indologist.

== Early training ==
Cœurdoux entered the novitiate of the Jesuits in 1715, was ordained in 1725, and made his final religious profession as a Jesuit in 1731, at Orléans. Shortly afterwards he left for India, arriving at the Madurai Mission (now in Tamil Nadu in southern India) in 1732.

== Career as a missionary and religious superior ==
Cœurdoux first studied Telugu, a major language of the Dravidian group, in order to work in the region of present Andhra Pradesh, in particular Krishnapuram, Bukkapuram, and Darmavaram Madigubba (1736 to 1737). In 1737, for health reasons, he had to return and remain in Pondicherry. He was the superior of the mission at Karnataka from 1744 to 1751 while he was serving the 4,000 Catholic Tamils in Pondicherry. As superior, he was obliged, against his own inclinations, to enforce the very restrictive decree of Pope Benedict XIV (12 September 1744 ) on the "Malabar rites". Convinced of the importance of the contemplative life, he brought together a number of Tamil girls and founded a Carmelite convent with them in 1748.

== Contributions to Indology ==
Cœurdoux is best known today as an Indologist. Talented at languages, he composed a Telugu–French–Sanskrit dictionary which is still authoritative. A disciple of the Jesuit philologist Jean Calmette, whom he knew personally in India, he was particularly interested in comparative linguistics. Max Müller called him the father of comparative philology. He was in contact with the French Indologists Anquetil Duperron and Joseph Nicolas de l'Isle. In a Mémoire sent to the Académie des inscriptions et belles-lettres (France) in 1767, he demonstrated the similarity between the Sanskrit, Latin, Greek, and even German and Russian. His observations were later compiled and published by others in Europe. He never returned to his homeland. Anquetil Duperron published a whole chapter after the French Revolution. It was only in the late 20th century, thanks to the work of J.J. Godfrey and Sylvia Murr (see Bibliography), that Cœurdoux's role in the discovery of the relationship between Sanskrit and the ancient languages of Europe had been re-established.

== Bibliography ==
- Mœurs et coutumes des Indiens. Ed. N.-J. Desvaulx. 1777.

== See also ==
- William Jones (philologist)
