= Richard Wooddeson =

British legal professional

Richard Wooddeson (1745–1822) was an English jurist, Vinerian Professor of English Law from 1777.

== Life ==
He was born on 15 May 1745 at Kingston-on-Thames, where his father Richard Wooddeson (1704–1774) was a noted schoolmaster. Educated at his father's school, he matriculated at Pembroke College, Oxford, on 29 May 1759. He was elected to a demyship at Magdalen College in 1759, graduating B.A. on 28 January 1763, M.A. on 10 October 1765, and D.C.L. on 31 May 1777. In 1772 he exchanged his demyship for a fellowship, which he held till his death. As a young man Wooddeson frequented Thomas Payne's house and literary circle at Mews Gate.

In 1766 Wooddeson was elected to a Vinerian scholarship in common law, and he was called to the bar in 1767 at the Middle Temple, who elected him a bencher in 1799. After acting for three years as deputy Vinerian professor, he was elected a Vinerian fellow in 1776, and served as proctor in the same year. On 4 March 1777 he was elected university lecturer on moral philosophy, and on 24 April, on the resignation of Robert Chambers, he was elected Vinerian professor, narrowly defeating Giles Rooke.

Wooddeson acted for many years as counsel to the university of Oxford and as a commissioner of bankrupts. In 1808 a fire broke out in his house in Chancery Lane and destroyed his library, mainly of legal works. He died, unmarried, on 29 October 1822 at his house in Boswell Court, Lincoln's Inn Fields, and was buried on 5 November in the benchers' vault in the Temple church. He left to the university, for the Clarendon Press, and to Magdalen College.

== Works ==
Wooddeson published two main legal works. The first, which appeared in 1783, was Elements of Jurisprudence treated of in the preliminary Part of a Course of Lectures on the Laws of England (London; new edit. Dublin, 1792). The second, published in 1792 and 1793, was A Systematical View of the Laws of England (London, 3 vols.; Dublin, 1792–4, 3 vols.) Originally delivered as a series of Vinerian lectures commencing in Michaelmas term 1777, and extending over a course of years, the latter work was a contribution towards systematising English law. A second edition was edited by William Rosser Williams in 1839 (London; Philadelphia, 1842).

Wooddeson was the author also of A Brief Vindication of the Rights of the British Legislature, in Answer to some Positions advanced in a Pamphlet entitled "Thoughts on the English Government, Letter the Second", a reply to John Reeves, London, 1799. He also made research collections for a work on tithes; but in poor health he asked Samuel Toller to carry out the plan.

== Notes ==
Attribution

This article incorporates text from a publication now in the public domain: Lee, Sidney, ed. (1900). "Wooddeson, Richard". Dictionary of National Biography. Vol. 62. London: Smith, Elder & Co.
