= William Jones (mathematician) =

Welsh mathematician (1675–1749)

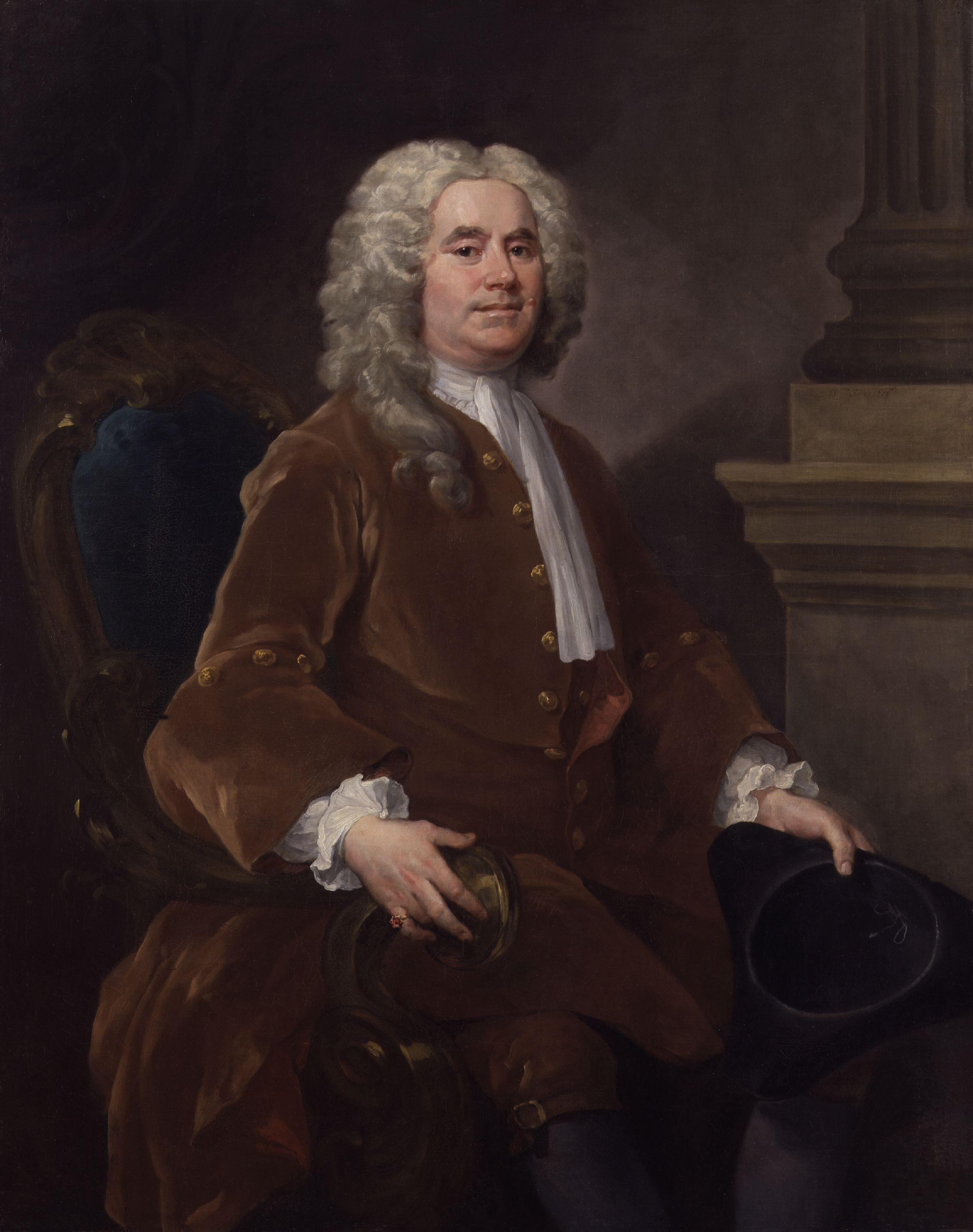
- Portrait by William Hogarth, 1740
- Born: 1675; Llanfihangel Tre'r Beirdd, Anglesey
- Died: 3 July 1749 (aged 73–74); London, England
- Children: Sir William Jones

William Jones, FRS (1675 – 1 July 1749) was a Welsh mathematician best known for his use of the symbol π (the Greek letter Pi) to represent the ratio of the circumference of a circle to its diameter. He was a close friend of Sir Isaac Newton and Sir Edmund Halley. In November 1711, Jones became a fellow of the Royal Society, and later served as the Royal Society's vice-president.

== Early life ==
William Jones was born as the son of Siôn Siôr (John George Jones) and Elizabeth Rowland in the parish of Llanfihangel Tre'r Beirdd, about 4 miles (6.4 km) west of Benllech on the Isle of Anglesey in Wales. He attended a charity school at Llanfechell, also on the Isle of Anglesey, where his mathematical talents were spotted by the local landowner Lord Bulkeley, who arranged for him to work in a merchant's counting-house in London. His main patrons were the Bulkeley family of north Wales, and later the Earl of Macclesfield.

== Early mathematical career ==
Jones initially served at sea, teaching mathematics on board Navy ships between 1695 and 1702, where he became very interested in navigation and published A New Compendium of the Whole Art of Navigation in 1702, dedicated to a benefactor John Harris. In this work he applied mathematics to navigation, studying methods of calculating position at sea. After his voyages were over he became a mathematics teacher in London, both in coffee houses and as a private tutor to George Parker, the son of the future Earl of Macclesfield, and also the future Baron Hardwicke.

== Later career ==
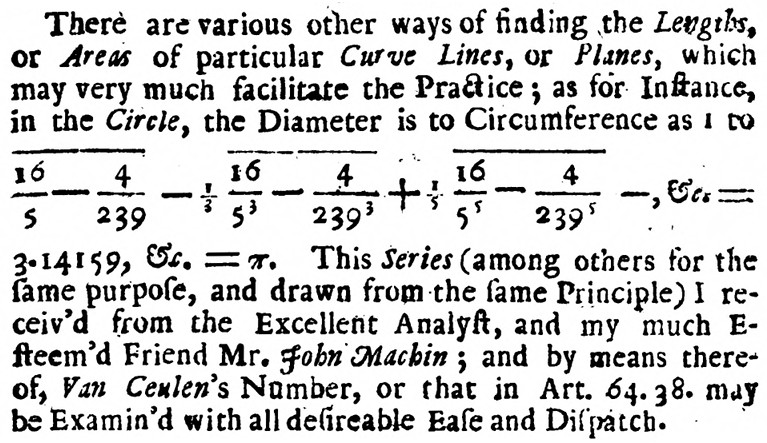
Jones' usage of π

Jones published Synopsis Palmariorum Matheseos in 1706, a work which was intended for beginners and which included theorems on differential calculus and infinite series. This used π for the ratio of circumference to diameter, following earlier abbreviations for the Greek word periphery (περιφέρεια) by William Oughtred and others. His 1711 work Analysis per quantitatum series, fluxiones ac differentias introduced the dot notation for differentiation in calculus.

He was noticed and befriended by two of Britain's foremost mathematicians – Edmund Halley and Sir Isaac Newton – and was elected a fellow of the Royal Society in 1711. He later became the editor and publisher of many of Newton's manuscripts and built up an extraordinary library that was one of the greatest collections of books on science and mathematics ever known, and only recently fully dispersed. Jones' Last Will and Testament left his library, along with his gold watch, to Earl of Macclesfield in acknowledgement of his support.

== Personal life ==
He married twice, firstly the widow of his counting-house employer, whose property he inherited on her death, and secondly, in 1731, Mary, the 22-year-old daughter of cabinet-maker George Nix, with whom he had two surviving children. His son, also named William Jones and born in 1746, was a renowned philologist who established links between Latin, Greek and Sanskrit, leading to the concept of the Indo-European language group.
