= Mayor's Court (India) =

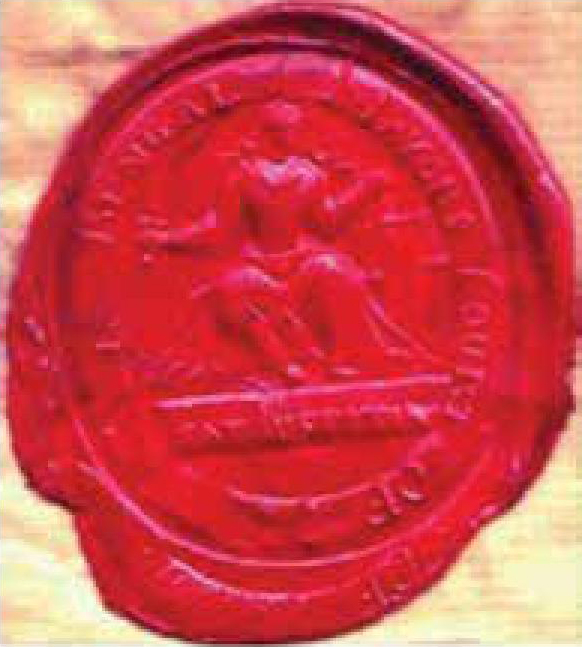
Seal of Calcutta Mayor's Court

Until the founding of the Supreme Court of Judicature at Fort William in 1774, the Mayor's Courts in Madras, Calcutta and Bombay were the East India Company's highest courts in British India. It was established by Charter of 1726.

== See also ==
- Judiciary of India
