= George Cornish Whitlock =

British army officer

Lieutenant-General Sir George Cornish Whitlock (1798–1868) was a British Madras Army officer, who commanded the Madras Column (also called the Saugor and Nerbudda field force) during the Indian Mutiny.

== Life ==
Whitlock was baptised on 3 August 1803 at Ottery St Mary, Devon, son of George and Charlotte. He was colonel of the 108th Regiment of Foot (Madras Infantry) from 1862 to his death.

He died aged 69 on Thursday 30 January 1868 at Exmouth, Devon.

== Family ==
Whitlock married Harriet, daughter of Sir Samuel Toller on 19 February 1825 in Bangalore, Madras, India. Col. Charles James Toller Whitlock (died 1912) was their son.
