= Samuel Toller =

English lawyer in India and legal writer (1764–1821)

Sir Samuel Toller, Kt, K.C., (1764–1821) was an English advocate-general of Madras and legal writer.

== Life ==
He was son of Thomas Toller (1732–1795), who succeeded his father-in-law, Samuel Lawrence, as preacher to the Presbyterian congregation in Monkwell Street, London. He was educated at Charterhouse School.

Toller was admitted to Lincoln's Inn 27 March 1781, was called to the bar, and in March 1812 was appointed Advocate-General of Madras. He was subsequently knighted by H.R.H. The Prince Regent on 9 Apr 1812 at Carlton House, and died in India on his way to Bangalore on 19 November 1821.

== Works ==
Toller was the author of two legal works:

- The Law of Executors and Administrators, London, 1800; 7th ed. by Francis Whitmarsh, 1838; 2nd American edit. by T. F. Gordon, Philadelphia, 1824, 3rd American edit. by E. D. Ingraham, 1834.
- Treatise of the Law of Tithes: compiled in Part from some Notes of Richard Wooddeson, London, 1808; 3rd ed. 1822.

== Family ==
In 1793 Toller married Miss Cory of Cambridge, sister of Robert Towerson Cory, with whom he had a daughter. After his wife's death, he married Charlotte Miller, who died in India in 1821; the couple produced six children.

Of his four daughters:

- the eldest, Maria, married in 1817 the Rev. William Malkin
- the second, Caroline, married in 1818 Thomas Gellibrand, Sheriff of Madras. The marriage took place in St. George's Church, Choultry Plain. Gellibrand died on 26 June 1824, aged 31. Caroline returned to the United Kingdom, on the Lord Hungerford, with two children, sailing in 1825. She married again, dying on 16 November 1875 the widow of William Foy of Stoke Newington.
- the third, Harriet, married in 1825 General George Whitlock (died 1867)
- the fourth, Charlotte, married Lieutenant William Edward Brooshooft, 35th Madras Native Infantry, in 1824.

Toller died intestate. Through the law firm Brundrett & Spinks, his estate was paid to sons Edward, Thomas and Frederick.

=== Frederick Toller ===
Frederick Toller entered St Bees Theological College in 1834; and was ordained priest by Charles Longley, the Bishop of Ripon, in 1838. He was parish priest in a number of parishes on both sides of the Pennines. He was perpetual curate at Mytholmroyd in 1837. He was carrying out baptisms in Bury, Lancashire in 1837; and from 1837 to 1840 he was vicar of Hebden Bridge. In 1841 he was the incumbent at Crosscrake chapel. He applied for financial support to re-endow St Laurence's Church, Morland in 1844. He carried out baptisms in Thornton-le-Fylde in 1845–6.

Toller officiated at St Mary, Stoke Newington on 2 August 1851, for the wedding of his niece Caroline Maria Foy, daughter of William Foy of Stoke Newington, to Alexander Nowell Robertson. At this period, from December 1850 to April 1852, he was headmaster of the school at Cavendish, Suffolk. In 1852 he was at Ballingdon.

By 1854 Toller was in the Midlands, at Stone, Staffordshire in 1854. From there, that year, he published an edition of Phaedrus, for school use, translated into English verse. In 1859, when he was curate of St Andrew's Church, Bordesley, a son Ludovic Thomas died. His wife Ann died at Winslow, Buckinghamshire in 1863, aged 39. Toller died at Datchworth in 1864, aged 57. He had been curate at Hanley, Staffordshire.

== Notes ==
Attribution

This article incorporates text from a publication now in the public domain: Lee, Sidney, ed. (1898). "Toller, Samuel". Dictionary of National Biography. Vol. 56. London: Smith, Elder & Co.
