= James Watson (judge) =

British Indian Judge

Sir James Watson

Puisne Judge of the Supreme Court of Judicature at Fort William
- In office 1 Mar 1796 – 2 May 1796

Personal details
- Born: 1748
- Died: 1796 (aged 47–48) Calcutta, British India
- Resting place: South Park Street Cemetery, Calcutta
- Profession: Barrister, Judge

James Watson (c. 1748 – May 1796) was a British Barrister and Puisne Judge of the Supreme Court of Judicature at Fort William in Bengal Presidency.

== Career ==
Watson practiced in England as a barrister before receiving appointment to the colonial judiciary in British India. In 1831, he was appointed a Puisne Judge of the Supreme Court of Judicature at Fort William in Calcutta. Watson was also Knighted. He died in Kolkata in May 1796, after serving only a few months in office.
