= Lawrence Peel =

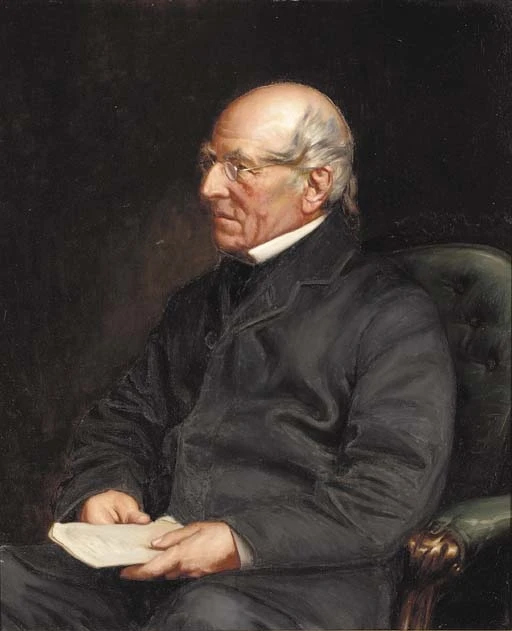
Portrait of a gentleman, traditionally identified as Sir Lawrence Peel

Sir Lawrence Peel (10 August 1799 – 22 July 1884) was a judge in India, Chief Justice of Bengal. Apart from his legal profession, he took an interest in horticulture and was a president of the Agricultural and Horticultural Society of Calcutta from 1848 to 1854.

== Life and work ==
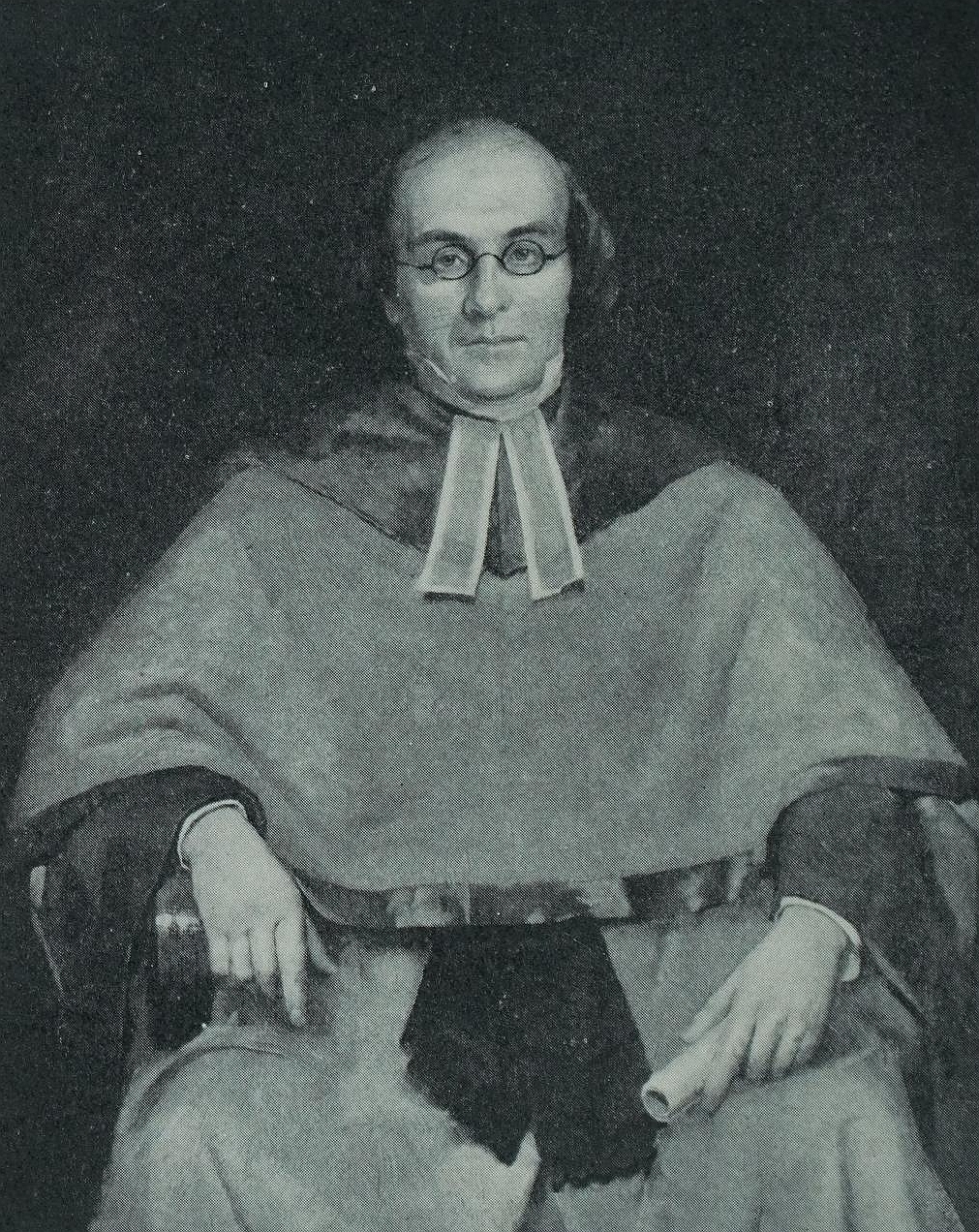
Source: Middle Temple

Lawrence Peel was third son of Joseph Peel of Bowes Farm, Middlesex, who died in 1821, and Anne, second daughter of Jonathan Haworth of Harcroft, Lancashire. His father was younger brother of the first Sir Robert Peel (1750–1830), and he was thus first cousin of the statesman, the second Sir Robert Peel (1788–1850).

He was sent to Rugby in 1812, and removing to St John's College, Cambridge, graduated B.A. 1821 and M.A. 1824. After his call to the bar at the Middle Temple on 7 May 1824 he went the northern circuit, and attended the Lancaster, Preston, and Manchester sessions.

He served as Advocate-General of Bengal at Calcutta from 1840 to 1842, and in the latter year, on being promoted to the chief-justiceship of the supreme court at Calcutta, was knighted by patent on 18 May. During 1854 and 1855 he was also vice-president of the legislative council at Calcutta. He gave away in public charity the whole of his official income of £8,000 a year. He was consequently very popular throughout his career in India and on his retirement in November 1855 a statue of him was erected in Calcutta.

Peel was also active in gardening and horticulture. He presided over the Agricultural and Horticultural Society in Calcutta from 1848 to 1854. He was involved in importing many new plants into India.

After his return to England he was sworn of the privy council, and was made a paid member of the judicial committee on 4 April 1856. He was elected a bencher of the Middle Temple on 8 May 1856, and became treasurer of his inn on 3 Dec. 1866. From 1857 he was a director of the East India Company, and in the following year was created a D.C.L. of the university of Oxford. In January 1864 he became president of Guy's Hospital, London. He was for some years a correspondent of the ‘Times’ on legal and general topics. He died, unmarried, at Garden Reach, Ventnor, Isle of Wight, on 22 July 1884.

== Works ==
- Horæ Nauseæ, 1841, poems translated and original (the latter are probably juvenile productions)
- A Sketch of the Life and Character of Sir R. Peel, 1860.

Legal offices
| Preceded by Sir Edward Ryan | Supreme Court of Judicature at Fort William; 1842–1855 | Succeeded by Sir James William Colvile |
