= Stephen Hyde Cassan =

Stephen Hyde Cassan (1789–1841) was an English Anglican priest and ecclesiastical biographer.

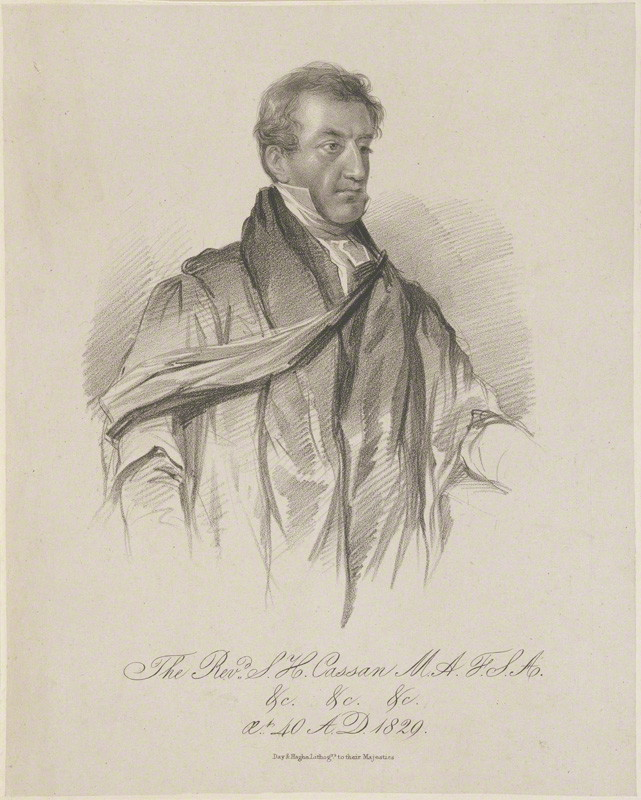
Stephen Hyde Cassan, 1829 lithograph

== Life ==
The son of Stephen Cassan, a barrister, and his wife Sarah, daughter of Charles Mears, he was born in Calcutta, where his father was sheriff. John Hyde was his godfather. He was educated at Magdalen Hall, Oxford, took his B.A. degree on 14 January 1815, received deacon's orders on 26 March following, and was ordained priest the next year.

While curate of Frome, Somerset, in 1820, Cassan made a runaway match with Fanny, daughter of the late Rev. William Ireland who had been vicar of that parish. This marriage occasioned considerable scandal, and led to legal proceedings. Moving from Frome, he held the curacy of Mere, Wiltshire, until 1831, when he was presented by Sir Colt Hoare to the living of Bruton with Wyke Champflower. He was also chaplain to the Earl of Caledon and to the Duke of Cambridge.

Cassan was elected a fellow of the Society of Antiquaries of London in 1829. After suffering from mental illness for two years, he died on 19 July 1841.

His son, Ernest, was a prominent West Country cricketer who played first-class cricket.

== Works ==
With a large family and money troubles, Cassan wrote books by subscription. Besides pamphlets he published:

- The Sin of Schism, and the Protestant Episcopal Church proved to be the only safe means of Salvation, a Sermon preached in the Parish Church of Frome, 1819; 2nd ed., with appendix, 1820. This was answered by A Word of Advice to the Curate of Frome, 1820.
- Lives and Memoirs of the Bishops of Sherborne and Salisbury, 1824.
- A volume of sermons, 1827.
- Lives of the Bishops of Winchester, 1827, 2 vols.
- Lives of the Bishops of Bath and Wells, 1830.

Cassan compiled and circulated family genealogies, and contributed genealogical notices to the Gentleman's Magazine.

== Notes ==
Attribution

This article incorporates text from a publication now in the public domain: Stephen, Leslie, ed. (1887). "Cassan, Stephen Hyde". Dictionary of National Biography. Vol. 9. London: Smith, Elder & Co.
