= Robert Henry Blosset =

Sir Robert Henry Blosset
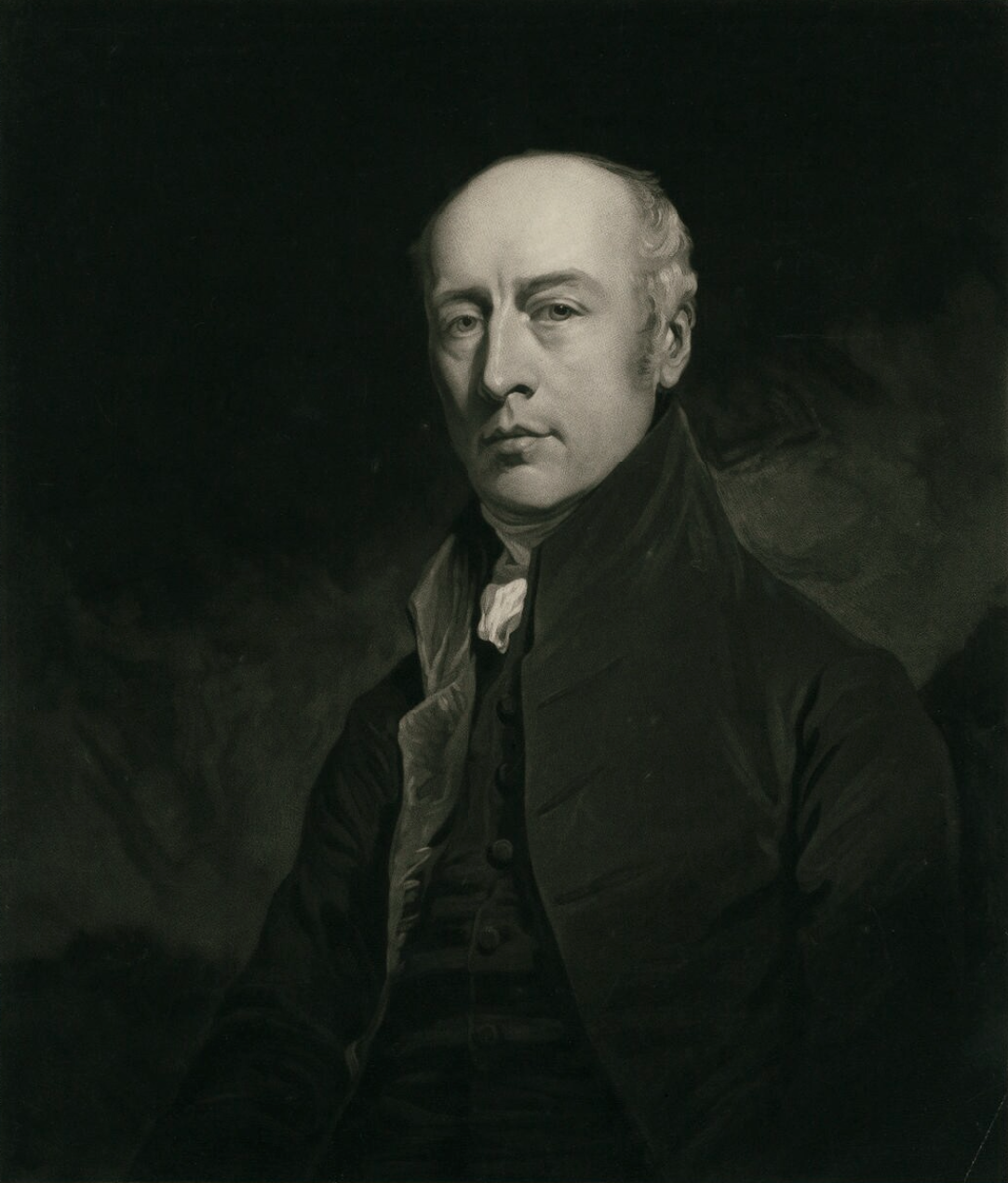
- Robert Henry Blosset
- Born: Robert Henry Peckwell; 26 June 1776; London, England
- Died: 1 February 1823 (aged 46); Calcutta, British India
- Occupations: Lawyer and judge

Sir Robert Henry Blosset (né Peckwell; 26 June 1776 – 1 February 1823) was an English lawyer who was briefly Chief Justice of Bengal. In 1811, he adopted his mother's surname.

== Early life ==
He was the son of Revd Henry Peckwell (1747–1787), a Methodist preacher, and his wife, Isabella Blosset (died 1816).

== Career ==
He was educated at Westminster School and Christ Church, Oxford, where he earned a BA in 1796 and an MA in 1799. He entered Lincoln's Inn in 1795 to study law, was called to the Bar in 1801 and made a Serjeant-at-Law in 1809. He was Deputy Recorder of Cambridge and counsel on the Norfolk circuit.

In 1821 he was appointed Chief Justice of the Supreme Court of Judicature of Bengal at Fort William, Calcutta and received the customary knighthood in 1822. He died in Calcutta (now Kolkata) on 1 February 1823, at the age of 46, within a few months of taking up his judicial duties there.

He was buried at St John's Church, Calcutta. He had never married and left his estate to his married sister, Selina Mary Grote.

He was the author of Cases on Controverted Elections in the Second Parliament of the United Kingdom (1805–1806).
