= Supreme Court of Judicature at Fort William =

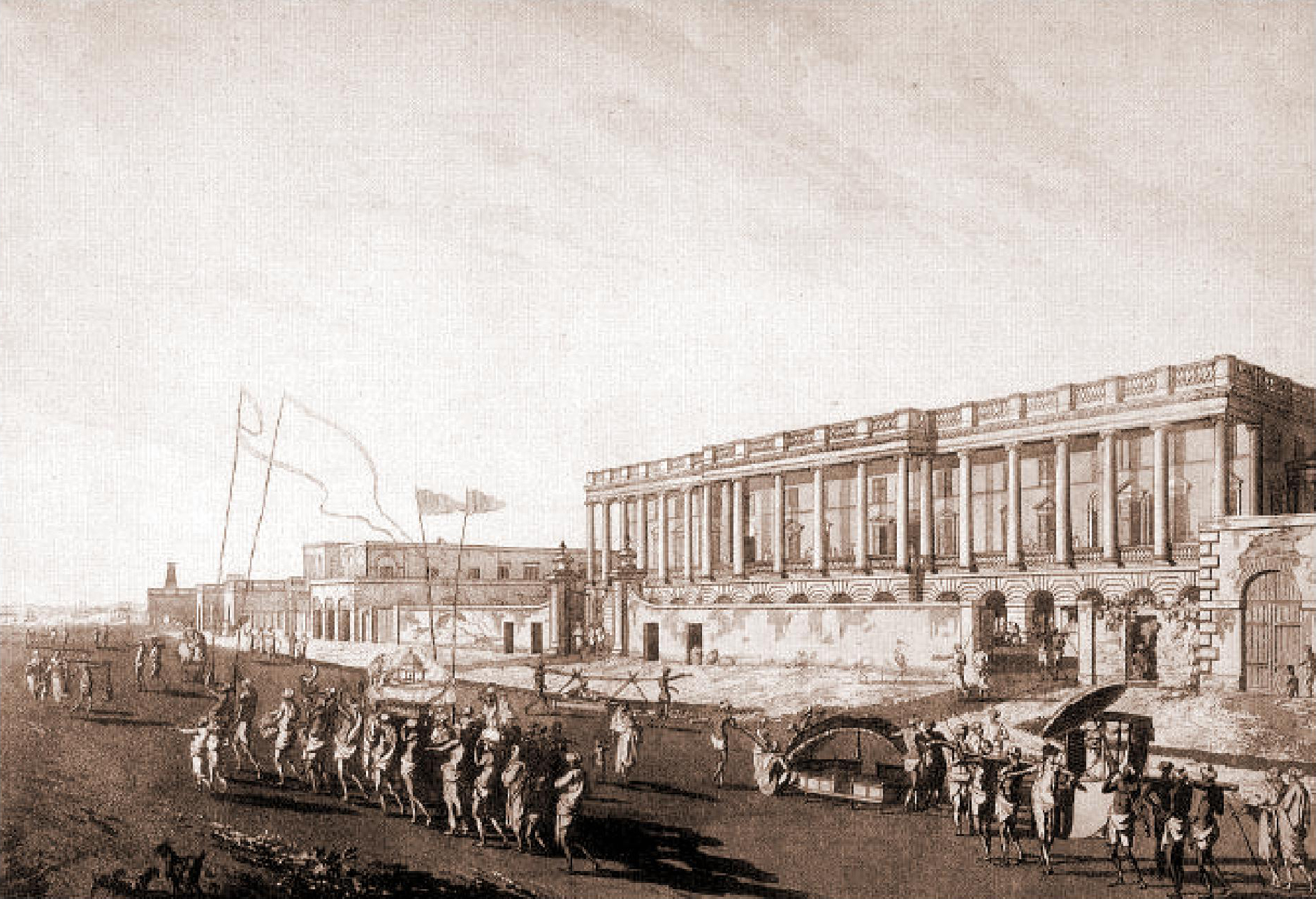
- Supreme Court of Judicature at Fort William, c. 1787

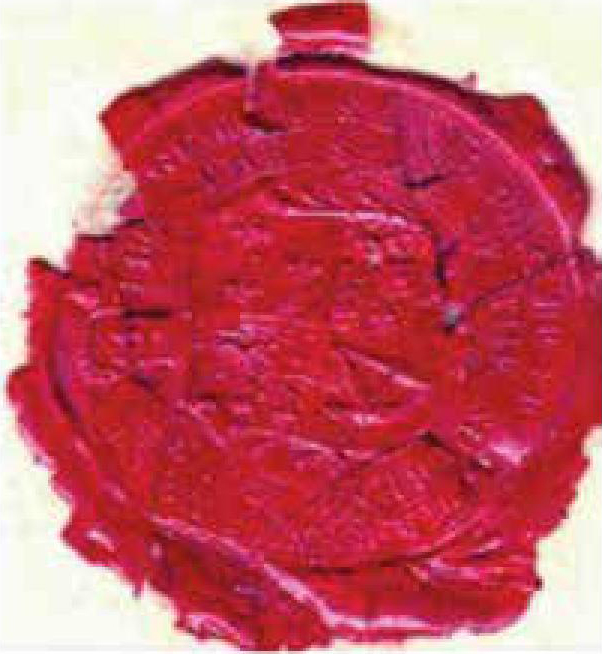
- Seal of Supreme Court of Judicature at Fort William
- Established: October 22, 1774; 251 years ago
- Dissolved: 1862; 164 years ago
- Jurisdiction: India
- Location: Calcutta, Bengal, British India
- Authorised by: Regulating Act of 1773
- Appeals to: Judicial Committee of the Privy Council
- Judge term length: Life tenure
- Number of positions: 4 by statute

The Supreme Court of Judicature at Fort William in Calcutta, was founded in 1774 by the Regulating Act 1773. It replaced the Mayor's Court of Calcutta and was British India's highest court from 1774 until 1862, when the High Court of Calcutta was established by the Indian High Courts Act 1861.

From 1774 to the arrival of Parliament's Bengal Judicature Act 1781 in June 1782, the Court claimed jurisdiction over any person residing in Bengal, Bihar or Orissa. These first years were known for their conflict with the Supreme Council of Bengal over the Court's jurisdiction. The conflict came to an end with Parliament's passing of the Bengal Judicature Act 1781 which restricted the Supreme Court's jurisdiction to either those who lived in Calcutta, or to any British subject in Bengal, Bihar and Orissa, thereby removing the court's jurisdiction over any person residing in Bengal, Bihar and Orissa.

The courthouse itself was a two storied building with Ionic columns and an urn-topped balustrade and stood by the side of the Writers’ Buildings. The building also served as the Town Hall of Calcutta at one time. It was demolished in 1792 and replaced by the present building in 1832.

== List ==
The court's first judges were

- Sir Elijah Impey, Chief justice from 1774 to 1783 on his recall to England for impeachment.
- Stephen Caesar Le Maistre, Puisne judge from 1774 to 1777 on his death.
- John Hyde (judge), Puisne judge from 1774 to 1796 on his death.
- Robert Chambers, Puisne judge from 1774 to 1783, Acting Chief Justice from 1783 to 1791. Chief Justice from 1791-1798, on his resignation.
- Sir William Jones, Puisne judge from 1783 to 1794 on his death.
- Sir William Dunkin, Puisne judge from August 14, 1791 to unknown.

=== Chief Justices ===
Chief Justice	Term	Notes
Sir Elijah Impey	16 March 1774–1791	Recalled 1783
Sir Robert Chambers	1791–1 Aug 1798	previously Acting Chief Justice 1783–1791
Sir John Anstruther, Bt	1798–22 Feb 1806	
Sir Henry Russell	1807–9 Nov 1813	
Sir Edward Hyde East	1813–July 1822	
Sir Robert Henry Blosset	1822–1 Feb 1823	(died in office)
Sir Christopher Puller	1823–26 May 1824	(died in office)
Sir Charles Grey	1825–1832	
Sir William O. Russell	22 Feb 1832–1833	(died in office)
Sir Edward Ryan	1833–1842	
Sir Lawrence Peel	1842–1855	
Sir James William Colvile	1855–1859	
Sir Barnes Peacock	1859–1862	afterwards Chief Justice of the High Court of Calcutta

=== Justices ===
Puisne judge	Term	Notes
Stephen Caesar Le Maistre	22 October 1774–4 Nov 1777	Died
John Hyde	22 October 1774–8 July 1796	Died
William Jones	22 Oct 1783–27 Apr 1791	Died
William Dunkin	3 Sept 1791–1 Aug 1797	Resigned
James Watson	1 Mar 1796–2 May 1796	Died
John Royds	23 Oct 1797–24 Sept 1817	Died
William Burroughs	3 Nov 1806–20 Dec 1815	Resigned
Francis Workman-Macnaghten	1 Mar 1816–2 Mar 1825	Resigned
Anthony Buller	26 Sept 1816–1 Jan 1827	Resigned
John Franks	6 Oct 1825–15 Mar 1831	Resigned
John Peter Grant	17 Oct 1833–1848	
Benjamin Heath Malkin	6 Oct 1835–21 Oct 1837	Died
