= Robert Chambers (English judge) =

English jurist

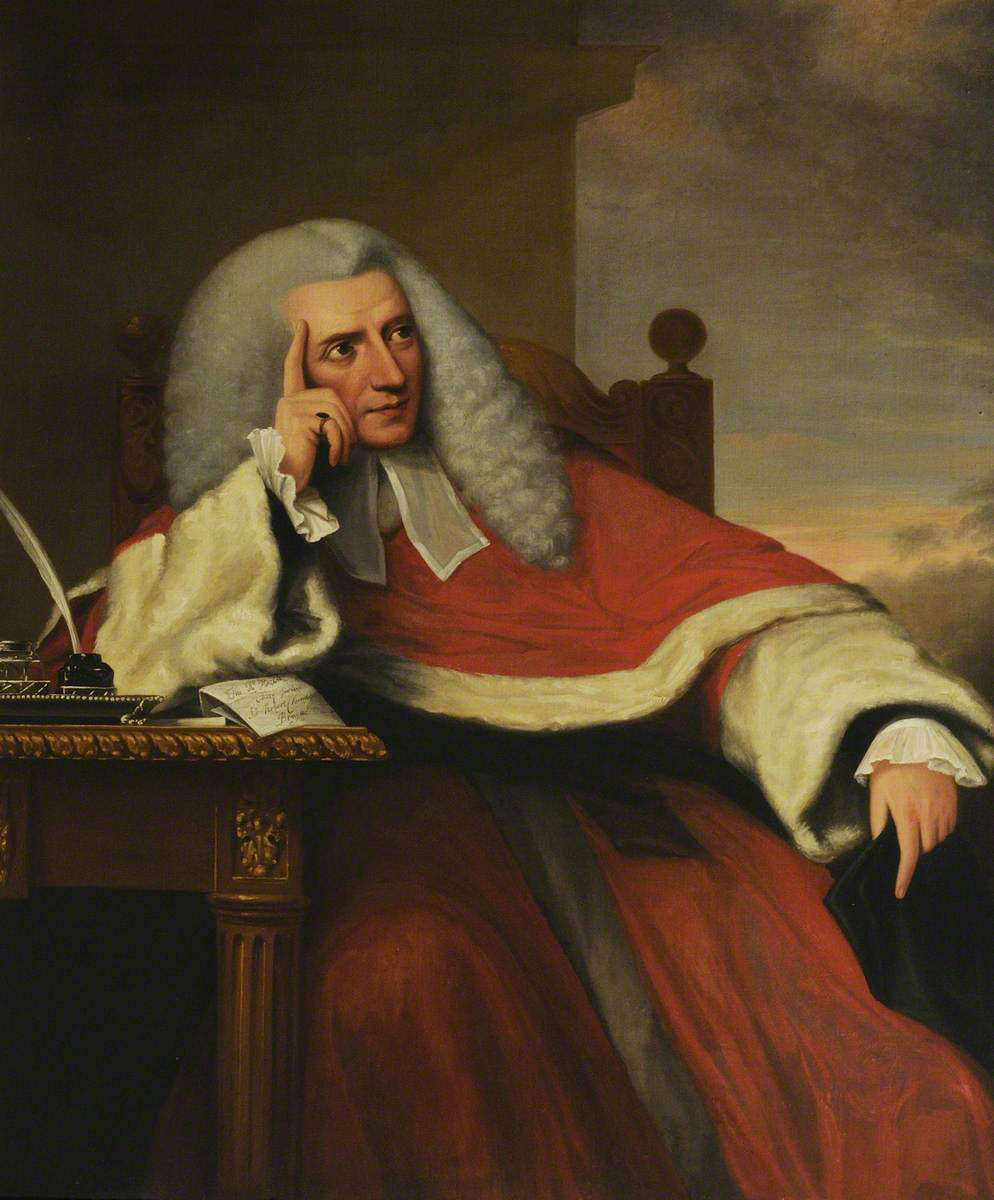

Puisne judge of the Supreme Court of Judicature at Fort William in Bengal
- In office 22 October 1774 – 3 December 1783

Sole Justice of the Presidency Court at Chinsurah
- In office 9 July 1781 – 15 November 1782

Acting Chief Justice of the Supreme Court of Judicature at Fort William in Bengal
- In office 3 December 1783 – 25 January 1791

Chief Justice of the Supreme Court of Judicature at Fort William in Bengal
- In office 25 January 1791 – 25 July 1798

Sir Robert Chambers (14 January 1737 – 9 May 1803) was an English jurist, Vinerian Professor of English Law, and Chief Justice of the Supreme Court of Judicature at Fort William in Bengal.

== Biography ==
Born in January 1737 in Newcastle upon Tyne, Chambers was the son of Robert Chambers, an attorney. He was educated at the Royal Grammar School in Newcastle and awarded an exhibition at Lincoln College, Oxford, in May 1754. Chambers was admitted to the Middle Temple in the same year, and was called to the bar in 1761. In that year, he was also appointed to a fellowship at University College, Oxford. On 7 May 1766 he was appointed Vinerian Professor of English Law at the University of Oxford, in succession to William Blackstone. He was also appointed Principal of New Inn Hall in 1766, a post which he held until his death, despite continued absence from it.

A contemporary and friend of Samuel Johnson from at least 1754 and up to Johnson's death in 1784, Chambers was provided references by Johnson in his pursuit of the Vinerian scholarship. Johnson also assisted Chambers in composing his lectures.

By 1773, the East India Regulating Act 1773 had been passed, establishing a supreme council (consisting of a governor-general, the first of whom was Warren Hastings, and four councillors) and judicature (consisting of a chief justice and three puisne judges) of Bengal. Chambers was appointed second judge under Sir Elijah Impey as chief justice, with a promise from the Lord Chancellor that if the Chief Justice's post became vacant, it would be offered to him. The judges departed for Calcutta in May 1774, although Chambers persuaded the Oxford authorities to allow him to retain his professorship for a further three years, in case he did not adapt to the Indian climate. His successor was therefore not appointed until 1777, when he was knighted (on 7 June).

Although Chambers was one of the judges in the notorious case of Maharaja Nandakumar, he escaped criticism, in part through his reputation for integrity. Impey, however, was eventually recalled to the United Kingdom in 1783, leaving Chambers as acting chief justice, but did not resign until 1787, and Chambers was not confirmed in the post until 1791. He served for eight years, returning to England in 1799. Despite frequent efforts to gain preferment, he appears to have acted with integrity despite the controversial administration of which he was part – and to have had a clear understanding that the laws of Georgian England were not always appropriate in the different culture and history of India.

As a result of his time in India, Chambers' health deteriorated, and in 1802 he left England again, this time for the kinder climate of the south of France. Whilst travelling, he fell ill at Paris, where he died in May 1803. He was buried in the Temple Church in London, where his monument was destroyed in 1941 during the Blitz.

In 1774, Chambers married Frances Wilton, daughter of the sculptor Joseph Wilton, who was a founder member of the Royal Academy. She survived him, along with four of their seven children.

Chambers left no publications, though he did consolidate a valuable collection of Sanskrit manuscripts while in India. Later biographers characterise him as a perfectionist, excessively conscientious and scrupulous, to the point where considerations of detail prevented him from completing much. In his legal career, his attempts to act conscientiously often had the appearance of indecisiveness and lack of conviction.

Chambers was a contributor to Hyde's Notebooks during his term on the bench of the Supreme Court of Judicature. The notebooks are a valuable primary source of information for life in late 18th century Bengal and are the only remaining source for the proceedings of the Supreme Court. Chambers continued the notebooks after Hyde's death in 1796.

== See also ==
- British East India Company
- The Literary Club

== Sources ==
- Hanbury, H. G., 1958. "The Vinerian Chair and Legal Education". Oxford: OUP.

Academic offices
Preceded by Sir William Blackstone	Vinerian Professor of English Law; 1766—1777	Succeeded by Richard Wooddeson
