= John Royds =

British Indian Judge

Judge of the Supreme Court of Judicature at Fort William
- In office 1797–1817

Personal details
- Born: 1752 Cheshire, England
- Died: 24 September 1817 (aged 64–65) Calcutta, Bengal Presidency
- Profession: Barrister, Judge

John Royds (1752 – 24 September 1817) was a British barrister and a Puisne Judge of the Supreme Court of Judicature at Fort William in Bengal.

== Career ==
Royds was born in Cheshire, England in 1752. He studied law in London and was called to the bar at the Middle Temple in 1780. He travelled to British India to pursue a legal career in the judicial system of the East India Company. In 1797, Royds was appointed as a Puisne Judge of the Supreme Court of Judicature at Fort William in Calcutta succeeding to the bench established by the Regulating Act of 1773. He became honoured as a Knight Bachelor by King George III in 1801 for his judicial service. Royds was also appointed as the Vice President of the Asiatic Society of Bengal in 1815.

A road in Kolkata, Royd Street, is named after Sir John Royds.

== Death ==
Royds died in office at Calcutta on 24 September 1817. He was buried at the South Park Street Cemetery in Kolkata.
