= Whitefield's Tabernacle =

Whitefield's Tabernacle is the name of several churches associated with George Whitefield, including:

- Whitefield's Tabernacle, Moorfields, London
- Whitefield's Tabernacle, Tottenham Court Road, London
- Whitefield's Tabernacle, Penn Street, Bristol
- Whitefield's Tabernacle, Kingswood (a town on the eastern edge of Bristol where Whitefield preached to miners)
