= H. W. Peckwell =

American artist

Henry W. Peckwell (1852–1936) was an American artist best known as a wood engraver for publications such as Scribner's Magazine and Harper's Magazine.

== Personal ==
Peckwell was born and raised in New York City, where he also spent his career. In 1883 he married Emma Mackenzie (1853–1934). In 1905, they resided at The Alpine apartment building at Broadway and 32nd Street. He was an active member of the New York Athletic Club over the course of several decades. He died in November 1936 and is interred at the Green-Wood Cemetery in Brooklyn, New York.

== Career ==
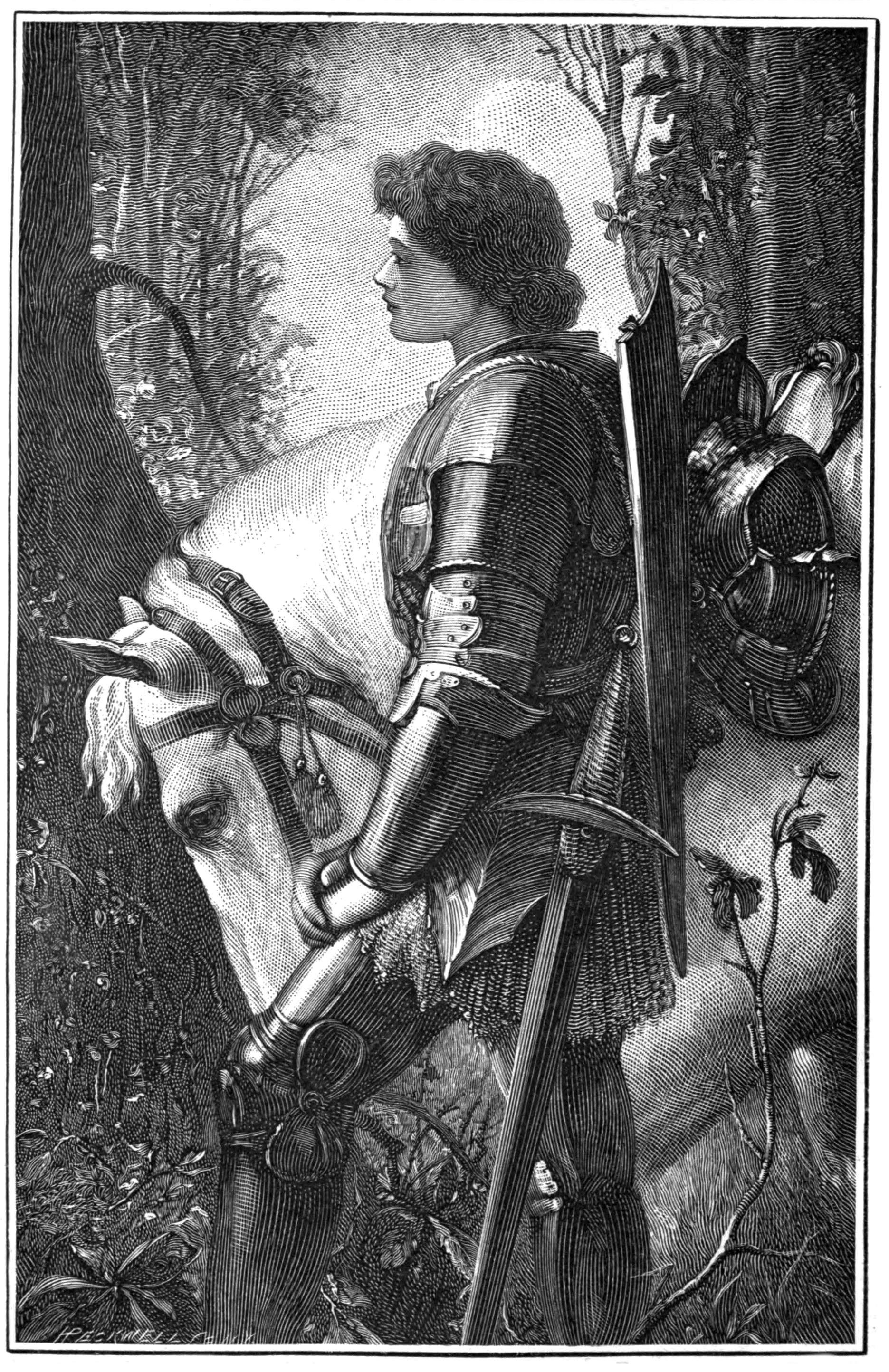
“Sir Galahad” by George Frederic Watts, engraved by H. W. Peckwell

=== Wood engraving ===
Peckwell's wood engravings were part of the "new school" of wood engraving in the last decades of the 19th century, and his work employed and advanced that school's innovatory and more subtle techniques. The persistence of finely crafted hand-done wood engravings in the face of modern photoengraving was also noted in the 1897 Columbian Cyclopedia, which noted in its entry on "wood-engraving" that Peckwell was "among the most noted and skillful of the present school."

He was also numbered among a group of "splendid engravers" by the "Brooklyn Museum Quarterly" in 1916.

His engravings, usually after paintings by other artists, appeared not only in national magazines such as Scribner's and Harper's, but were also collected in primers such as The Children's Second Reader by Ellen M. Cyr.

=== Other engraving ===
He also did engraving work on commission, for works such as bookplates.

=== Art instruction ===
In 1909, Peckwell was recorded as a tutor at the City College of New York with a salary of $1,300.00 which was then increased to $1,400.00.

== Awards ==
- 1901: Bronze medal, the Pan-American Exposition, Buffalo, New York.

== Exhibits ==
- 1901: Peckwell's "Death of Braddock" after Howard Pyle, the Pan-American Exposition in Buffalo, New York.
- 1915: Peckwell's "Midsummer" after Henry Moore, and "A Story Without Words" after Howard Pyle, exhibition of American wood engraving, the American Institute Of Graphic Arts.

== Bibliography ==
- Anthony, Andrew Varick Stout, Timothy Cole, and Elbridge Kingsley. "Wood Engraving: Three Essays, With a List of American Books Illustrated With Woodcuts." New York: The Grolier Club, 1916.
- Brooks, Stratton Duluth. Peckwell, et al., illus. "Brook's Readers, Third Year." New York: American Book Company, 1906.
- Johnson, Robert Underwood, and Clarence Clough Buel. Peckwell, et al., illus. "Battles and Leaders of the Civil War." New York: The Century Co., 1887.
