= Stephen Cassan (barrister) =

Irish barrister

Stephen Cassan (1758–1794) was an Irish barrister in Calcutta, where he was one of the founders of the Bengal Journal. He was High Sheriff of Calcutta in 1785.

== Life ==
He was the youngest son of Stephen Cassan (1725–1773) of Sheffield House, Queen's County, Ireland. He went to Trinity College, Dublin in 1773, joined the Middle Temple in 1778, and was called to the bar in 1781.

Cassan founded the Bengal Journal, a weekly newspaper, in 1785, with Thomas Jones. In 1789 he owned two-thirds of the Bengal Journal, with James Dunkin. They brought in William Duane to improve the publication, and the circulation more than doubled in 1790. Duane, however, alarmed the East India Company authorities with his reports of revolutionary events in France, and of intrigues in the various Indian princely courts where a return of French influence was greatly feared. He further offended by printing a spurious report of Lord Cornwallis having been killed while on campaign against Tipu Sultan. Duane blamed a source he identified as an agent of the French Royalist French Government in Exile. Sued for libel, and removed from the paper, Duane was dragged by his hair through the streets of Calcutta, was committed to a debtors' prison. It is not clear if the paper survived.

William Hickey states that Cassan, after marrying went to Bombay to practise in the Mayor's Court, but died spitting blood. He is also said to have died in Bengal, intestate, on 26 January 1794.

== Family ==
Cassan married Sarah Mears, and was father of Stephen Hyde Cassan. Sarah Cassan was the daughter of Captain Charles Mears of Coleraine, and of the East Indiaman Egmont. He was the son of the minister John Mears. Sarah published a book of poems in 1806.
