= John Hyde (judge) =

British judge in Bengal (1738–1796)

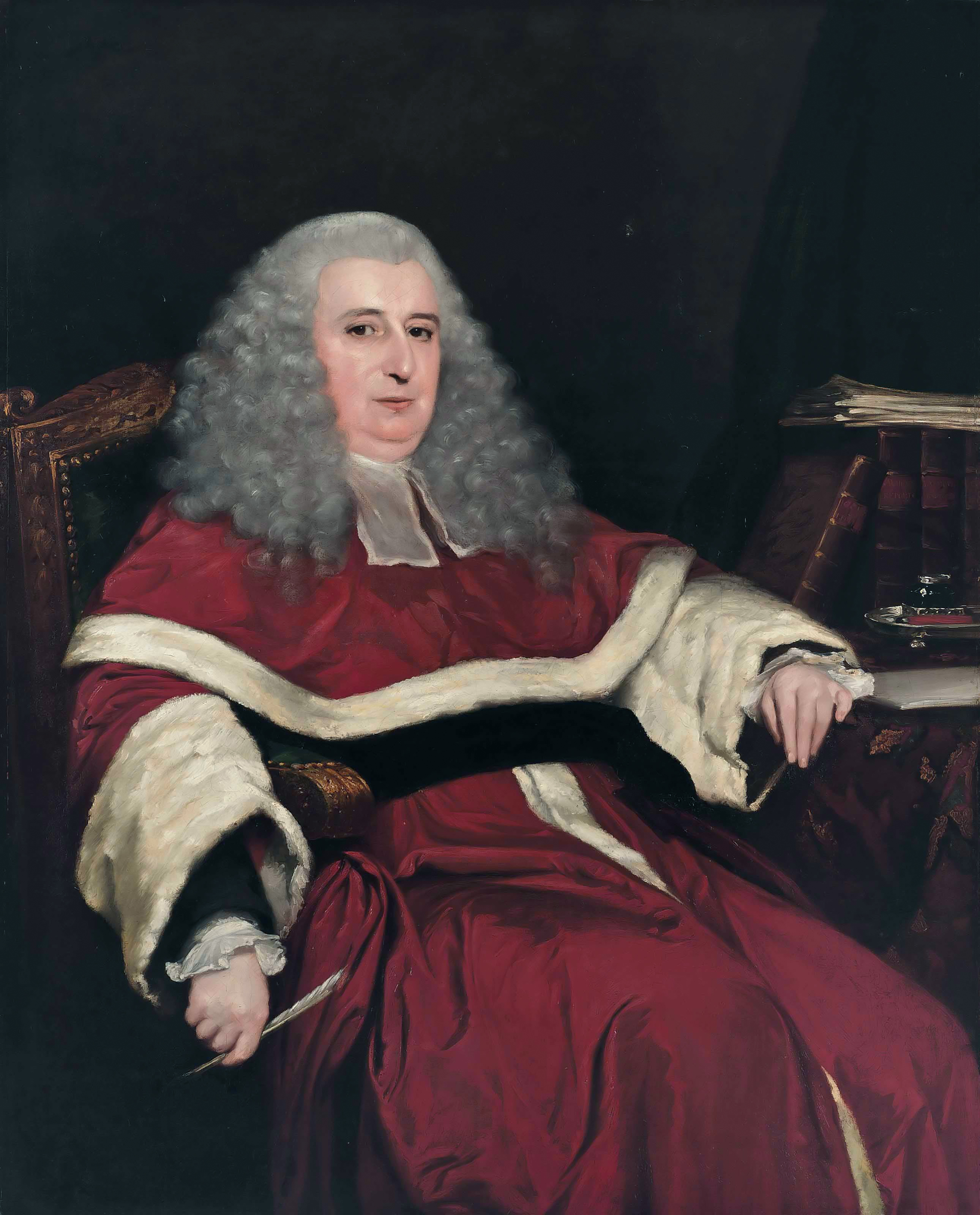
- John Hyde (c. 1791–1796) (Robert Home)

Puisne judge of the Supreme Court of Judicature at Fort William in Bengal
- In office 22 October 1774 – 8 July 1796

Personal details
- Born: 14 January 1738
- Died: 8 July 1796 (aged 58) Calcutta, India

John Hyde (14 January 1738 – 8 July 1796) was a Puisne Judge on the Supreme Court of Judicature at Fort William in Bengal from 1774 to his death. He is the primary author of Hyde's Notebooks, a series of 74 notebooks that are a trove of information for the first years of the Supreme Court of Judicature at Fort William, the highest court in Bengal from 1774 to 1862. The originals of these are kept at the Victoria Memorial in Kolkata. Partial microfilms are held at the National Library of India, Kolkata. The digitized microfilm is available online. The originals, which vary slightly from the microfilm, were digitized in 2015 but are not yet released.

== Judicial Record ==
Hyde gained a reputation as a morally upright judge in a time of general corruption in the British East India Company. While Chief Justice Elijah Impey and puisne judge Sir Robert Chambers both accepted bribes from Governor-General of Bengal Warren Hastings in return for compromising their judicial positions, Hyde refused offers. Hyde was unique among the judges in thinking that all individuals in Bengal, Indians and British alike, deserved the same rights, noting that the Supreme Court's charter called everyone residing in Bengal British subjects: “it seems to me that in this clause his majesty expressly calls all the inhabitants of Bengal, Bahar and Orissa, his subjects, which is a fact that the servants of the Company here are not willing to allow.”

== Hyde's Notebooks ==
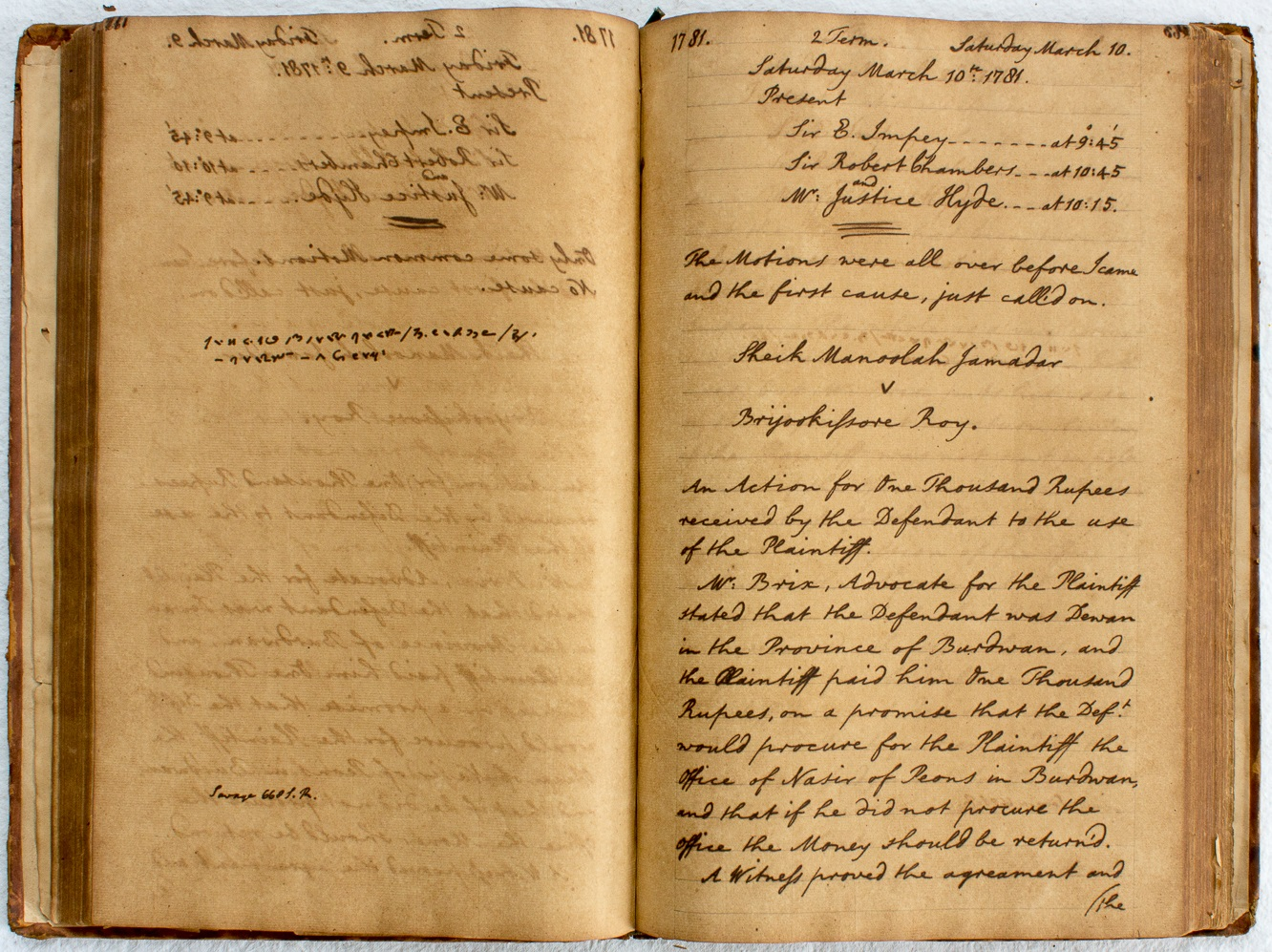
A page from Hyde's Notebooks in March 1781

Upon joining the bench, Hyde began an ambitious project to record the trials he and his fellow judges presided over. Hyde desired his notebooks to be printed and published for the public interest but this never happened. Hyde's Notebooks comprise 22,000 pages of handwritten notes in 74 bound volumes written between 1775 and 1798. Of these, 24 were written by Hyde alone, 41 were by Hyde in collaboration with his fellow judges, Sir Robert Chambers, and Sir William Jones, and 9 were by Chambers' alone after Hyde's death. They can be divided as follows:

- 14 by Hyde. 1775-1783
- 41 by Hyde, Chambers, and Jones. 1783-1794
- 10 by Hyde. 1794-1796
- 9 by Chambers. 1796-1798

=== Shorthand ===
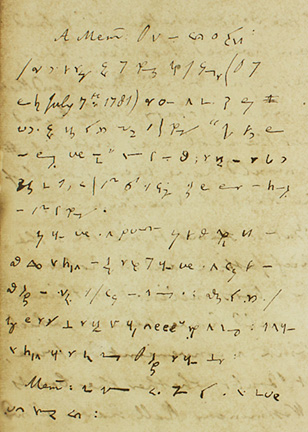
Hyde's notebook entry, March 8, 1782. Hyde used James Weston's shorthand.

Approximately 40 pages of the notebooks are written in shorthand, which Hyde used to conceal thoughts and record his fellow judges accepting bribes. Hyde used James Weston's shorthand system "Stenography compleated". Weston's shorthand system was first published in 1727.

=== Notebooks' history ===
After Hyde's death the notebooks passed to Chief Justice Sir Robert Chambers who continued writing them till his retirement in 1798. Chambers intended to have the notebooks published but died in 1803 before doing so. The notebooks then passed to Chambers' wife Frances Wilton Chambers, who gave them to Sir Charles Harcourt Chambers, the nephew of Robert Chambers and puisne judge at the Bombay Supreme Court. When Charles Harcourt Chambers died in 1828, the notebooks returned to Frances Wilton Chambers who gave them to Sir William Russell, the Chief Justice of the Supreme Court of Judicature at Fort William in 1832. The notebooks remained in the Supreme Court's library until the creation of the High Court of Calcutta in 1862 when they were transferred to the High Court's Bar Library.

In 1974, the notebooks were transferred from the High Court's Bar Library to the Victoria Memorial. In 1978, the notebooks, with the exception of volumes 1-3 (since they were too brittle) were microfilmed by the National Library of India. Two microfilm copies were made, one of which remains in poor condition at the National Library while the other is in the United States. In 2019, the U.S. microfilm has been digitised and is available freely online.

In 2014 and 2015, the Victoria Memorial in conjunction with Jadavpur University's School of Cultural Texts and Records digitized the notebooks, including the remains of volumes 1-3. However, these digitised images have not yet been released to the public.

=== Disappeared records ===
The notebooks (volumes 1-3) from 1775 to 1777, which contained the important Nanda Kumar trial were mostly destroyed for unknown reasons at some point in the 18th or 19th century. The records from the first term of 1780 have disappeared, as well as a small volume with a brass clasp which contained Hyde's detailed notes on some particularly controversial trials.

At some point between the creation of the microfilm and Jadavpur University's digitization project, a portion of the paper at the bottom of one of the volumes was trimmed, resulting in the loss content near the bottom of the page.

=== Historical importance ===
The notebooks are a valuable primary source of information for life in late 18th century Bengal. They are the only known remaining source for the early proceedings of the Supreme Court of Judicature at Fort William. As such, the Supreme Court rulings, documented in the notebooks, form the beginning of India’s current legal system. Attorneys and Judges in the 19th century used his notebooks to write books of precedent and case law. The notebooks were used as the basis for at least three casebooks.

== Personal life ==
Hyde refused knighthood despite being offered it. He married Mary Seymour, daughter of Lord Francis Seymour, in 1773. After his death, she married the Rev. John Payne of Droxford. Hyde's youngest daughter Caroline Frances married Robert Walpole.
