= William Jones (philologist) =

British philologist, scholar and judge (1746–1794)

Sir William Jones FRS FRAS FRSE
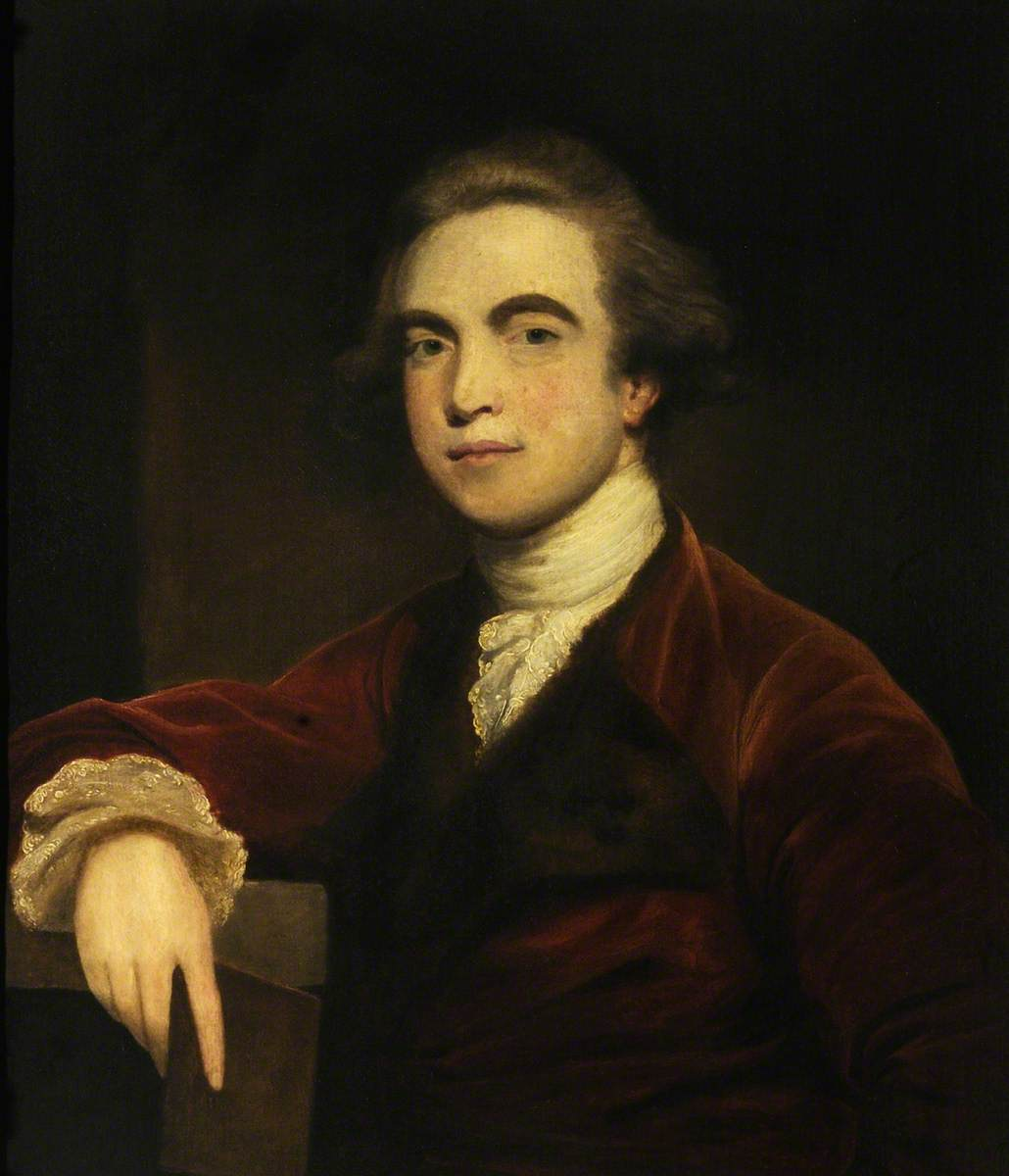
- Portrait by Sir Joshua Reynolds, 1767–1769

Puisne judge of the Supreme Court of Judicature at Fort William in Bengal
- In office 22 October 1783 – 27 April 1794

Personal details
- Born: 9 October 1746 Westminster, London
- Died: 27 April 1794 (aged 47) Calcutta, Bengal Presidency
- Resting place: South Park Street Cemetery
- Spouse: Anna Maria Shipley (m. 1783)
- Parent: William Jones (father)

Sir William Jones (28 September 1746 – 27 April 1794) was a British philologist, scholar and judge. Born in Westminster to the Welsh mathematician William Jones, he moved to the Bengal Presidency, where he served as a puisne judge on the Supreme Court of Judicature at Fort William and also became a scholar of ancient Indian history. He is known for being one of the earliest scholars after father Gaston-Laurent Coeurdoux to assert the kinship of the Indo-European languages. Jones also founded the Asiatic Society in Calcutta in 1784.

== Early life ==
William Jones was born in London; his father William Jones (1675–1749) was a mathematician from Anglesey in Wales, noted for introducing the mathematical use of the symbol π. The young William Jones was a linguistic prodigy, who in addition to his native languages English and Welsh, learned Greek, Latin, Persian, Arabic, Hebrew and the basics of Chinese writing at an early age. By the end of his life, he knew eight languages with critical thoroughness.

Jones's father died when he was aged three, and his mother Mary Nix Jones raised him. He was sent to Harrow School in September 1753 and then went on to University College, Oxford. He graduated there in 1768 and became M.A. in 1773. Financially constrained, he took a position tutoring the seven-year-old Lord Althorp, son of Earl Spencer. For the next six years, he worked as a tutor and translator. During this time he published in 1770 Histoire de Nader Chah (History of Nader Shah), a French translation of a work originally written in Persian by Mirza Mehdi Khan Astarabadi. This was done at the request of King Christian VII of Denmark: he had visited Jones, who by the age of 23 had already acquired a reputation as an orientalist, and in appreciation of his work he was granted membership in the Royal Danish Academy of Sciences and Letters. This would be the first of his numerous works on Persia, Anatolia, and the Middle East in general.

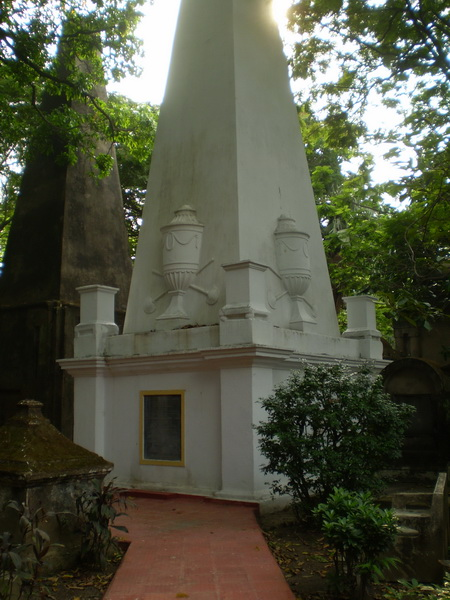
Tomb of William Jones in South Park Street Cemetery, Kolkata.

== Legal studies and politics in England ==
In 1770, Jones joined the Middle Temple and studied law for three years, a preliminary to his life-work in India. He was elected a Fellow of the Royal Society on 30 April 1772. In 1773, he was elected a member of The Club, of which he became president in 1780. He spent some time as a circuit judge in Wales, and then became involved in politics: he made a fruitless attempt to resolve the American Revolution in concert with Benjamin Franklin in Paris, and ran for the post of Member of Parliament from Oxford in the general election of 1780, but was unsuccessful.

Jones was a radical political thinker, and a friend of American independence. His work, The principles of government; in a dialogue between a scholar and a peasant (1783), was the subject of a trial for seditious libel (known as the Case of the Dean of St Asaph) after it was reprinted by his brother-in-law William Davies Shipley.

== Indian tenure ==
He was appointed puisne judge to the Supreme Court of Judicature at Fort William in Calcutta, Bengal, on 4 March 1783, and on 20 March he was knighted. In April 1783 he married Anna Maria Shipley, the eldest daughter of Jonathan Shipley, Bishop of Llandaff and Bishop of St Asaph. Anna Maria used her artistic skills to help Jones document life in India. On 25 September 1783, he arrived in Calcutta.

In the Subcontinent he was entranced by Indian culture, an as-yet untouched field in European scholarship, and on 15 January 1784 he founded the Asiatic Society in Calcutta. He studied the Vedas with Rāmalocana, a pandit teaching at the Hindu University of Nadiya, becoming a proficient Sanskritist. Jones kept up a ten-year correspondence on the topic of jyotisa or Hindu astronomy with fellow orientalist Samuel Davis. He learnt the ancient concept of Hindu Laws from Pandits.

Over the next ten years, he produced a flood of works on India, launching the modern study of the subcontinent in virtually every social science. He also wrote on the Hindu and Muslim laws, music, literature, botany, and geography, and made the first English translations of several important works of Indian literature.

Sir William Jones sometimes also went by the nom de plume Youns Uksfardi (Persian: یونس اوکسفردی, lit. 'Jones of Oxford'). This pen name can be seen on the inner front cover of his Persian Grammar published in 1771 (and in subsequent editions).

Jones's works, especially his translations, with their philological and anthropological appeal, became a major inspiration of a certain orientalist strain discernible in Romantic poetries such as Coleridge's "Kubla Khan" or Fitzgerald's "Rubaiyat of Omar Khayyam".

He died in Calcutta on 27 April 1794 at the age of 47 and is buried in South Park Street Cemetery.

== Scholarly contributions ==
Jones is known today for his propositions about relationships between the Indo-European languages. In his Third Anniversary Discourse to the Asiatic Society (1786) he suggested that Sanskrit, Greek and Latin languages had a common root, and that indeed they might all be further related, in turn, to Gothic and the Celtic languages, as well as to Persian. Although his name is closely associated with this observation, he was not the first to make it. In the 16th century, European visitors to India became aware of similarities between Indian and European languages and as early as 1653, the Dutch scholar Marcus Zuerius van Boxhorn had published a proposal for a proto-language ("Scythian") for Germanic, Romance, Greek, Baltic, Slavic, Celtic and Iranian. Finally, in a memoir sent to the French Academy of Sciences in 1767 Gaston-Laurent Coeurdoux, a French Jesuit who spent all his life in India, had specifically demonstrated the existing analogy between Sanskrit and European languages. In 1786 Jones postulated a proto-language uniting Sanskrit, Iranian, Greek, Latin, Germanic and Celtic, but in many ways, his work was less accurate than his predecessors, as he erroneously included Egyptian, Japanese and Chinese in the Indo-European languages, while omitting Hindustani and Slavic. Jones also suggested that Sanskrit "was introduced [to north India] by conquerors from other kingdoms in some very remote age" displacing "the pure Hindi" of north India.

Nevertheless, Jones's third annual discourse before the Asiatic Society on the history and culture of the Hindus (delivered on 2 February 1786 and published in 1788) with the famed "philologer" passage is often cited as the beginning of comparative linguistics and Indo-European studies.

The Sanscrit language, whatever be its antiquity, is of a wonderful structure; more perfect than the Greek, more copious than the Latin, and more exquisitely refined than either, yet bearing to both of them a stronger affinity, both in the roots of verbs and the forms of grammar, than could possibly have been produced by accident; so strong indeed, that no philologer could examine them all three, without believing them to have sprung from some common source, which, perhaps, no longer exists; there is a similar reason, though not quite so forcible, for supposing that both the Gothic and the Celtic, though blended with a very different idiom, had the same origin with the Sanscrit; and the old Persian might be added to the same family.

This common source came to be known as Proto-Indo-European.

Jones was the first to propose the concept of an "Aryan invasion" into the Indian subcontinent, which according to Jones led to a lasting ethnic division in India between descents of indigenous Indians and those of the Aryans. This idea fell into obscurity due to a lack of evidence at the time, but was later taken up by amateur Indologists such as the colonial administrator Herbert Hope Risley.

Jones also propounded theories that might appear peculiar today but were less so in his time. For example, he believed that Egyptian priests had migrated and settled down in India in prehistoric times. He also posited that the Chinese were originally Hindus belonging to the Kshatriya caste.

Jones, in his 1772 Essay on the Arts called Imitative, was one of the first to propound an expressive theory of poetry, valorising expression over description or imitation: "If the arguments, used in this essay, have any weight, it will appear, that the finest parts of poetry, music, and painting, are expressive of the passions...the inferior parts of them are descriptive of natural objects". He thereby anticipated Wordsworth in grounding poetry on the basis of a Romantic subjectivity.

Jones was a contributor to Hyde's Notebooks during his term on the bench of the Supreme Court of Judicature. The notebooks are a valuable primary source of information for life in late 18th-century Bengal and are the only extant sources for the proceedings of the Supreme Court.

== Legal contributions ==
After reaching Calcutta, Jones was unhappy with the appointed pandits of the court, who were tasked with interpreting the laws of Hinduism and contributing to judgements. After a number of cases in which different pandits came up with different rulings, Jones determined to thoroughly learn Sanskrit so that he could independently interpret the original sources.

Jones's final judicial project was suggesting and leading the compilation of a Sanskrit "digest of Hindu Law", with the original plan of translating the work himself. After his death, the translation was completed by Henry Thomas Colebrooke.

== View on the historical timeline of the Biblical events ==
Jones said that "either the first eleven chapters of Genesis... are true, or the whole fabrick [sic] of our national religion is false, a conclusion which none of us, I trust, would wish to be drawn." (1788, 225)

He also said that "I... am obliged of course to believe the sanctity of the venerable books [of Genesis]." (1788, 225)

Jones "traced the foundation of the Indian empire above three thousand eight hundred years from now" (Jones, 1790). Jones thought it was important that this date would be between Archbishop Ussher's Creation date of 4004 BC and the Great Flood that Jones considered to have been in 2350 BC.

== Encounter with Anquetil-Duperron ==
In Europe, a discussion as to the authenticity of the first translation of the Avesta scriptures arose. It was the first evidence of an Indo-European language as old as Sanskrit to be translated into a modern European language. It was suggested that the so-called Zend-Avesta was not the genuine work of the prophet Zoroaster but was a recent forgery. Foremost among the detractors, it is to be regretted, was the distinguished (though young) orientalist William Jones. He claimed, in a letter published in French (1771), that the translator Anquetil-Duperron had been duped, that the Parsis of Surat had palmed off upon him a conglomeration of worthless fabrications and absurdities. In England, Jones was supported by Richardson and Sir John Chardin; in Germany, by Meiners. Anquetil-Duperron was labelled an impostor who had invented his own script to support his claim. This debate was not settled for almost a century.

== Chess poem ==
In 1763, at the age of 17, Jones wrote the poem Caissa in English, based on a 658-line poem called "Scacchia, Ludus" published in 1527 by Marco Girolamo Vida, giving a mythical origin of chess that has become well known in the chess world.

In the poem, the nymph Caissa initially repels the advances of Mars, the god of war. Spurned, Mars seeks the aid of the god of sport, who creates the game of chess as a gift for Mars to win Caissa's favour. Mars wins her over with the game.

Caissa has since been referred to as the "goddess" of chess, and her name is used in several contexts in modern chess playing.

== An Elegiac Poem ==
Thomas Maurice (1754–1824) published An Elegiac Poem in 1795; full title: An Elegiac and Historical Poem: Sacred to the Memory and Virtues of the Honourable Sir William Jones. Containing a Retrospective Survey of the Progress of Science, and the Mohammedan Conquests in Asia.

== Schopenhauer's citation ==
Arthur Schopenhauer referred to one of Sir William Jones's publications in §1 of The World as Will and Representation (1819). Schopenhauer was trying to support the doctrine that "everything that exists for knowledge, and hence the whole of this world, is only object in relation to the subject, perception of the perceiver, in a word, representation." He quoted Jones's original English:

... how early this basic truth was recognized by the sages of India since it appears as the fundamental tenet of the Vedânta philosophy ascribed to Vyasa, is proved by Sir William Jones in the last of his essays: "On the Philosophy of the Asiatics" (Asiatic Researches, vol. IV, p. 164): "The fundamental tenet of the Vedânta school consisted not in denying the existence of matter, that is solidity, impenetrability, and extended figure (to deny which would be lunacy), but in correcting the popular notion of it, and in contending that it has no essence independent of mental perception; that existence and perceptibility are convertible terms."

Schopenhauer used Jones's authority to relate the basic principle of his philosophy to what was, according to Jones, the most important underlying proposition of Vedânta. He made more passing reference to Sir William Jones's writings elsewhere in his works.

== Oration by Hendrik Arent Hamaker ==
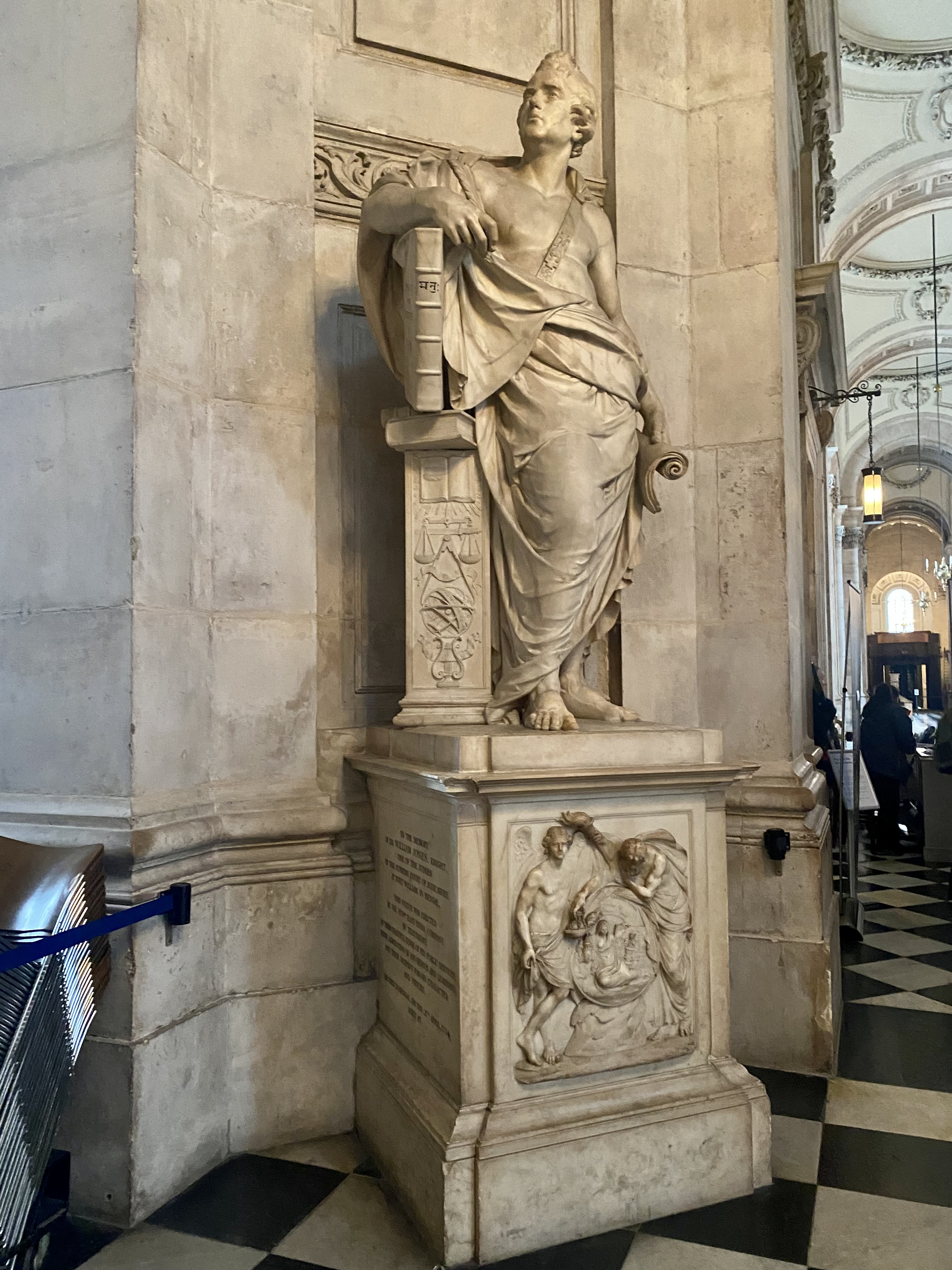
Statue of Jones in St Paul's Cathedral, London

On 28 September 1822, the Dutch orientalist Hendrik Arent Hamaker, who accepted a professorship at the University of Leiden, gave his inaugural lecture in Latin De vita et meritis Guilielmi Jonesii (The Life and Works of William Jones)(Leiden, 1823).

== Memorial ==
There is a statue of Jones, by the sculptor John Bacon in St Paul's Cathedral, London, erected in 1799.

== List of works ==
Listing in most cases only editions and reprints that came out during Jones's own lifetime, books by, or prominently including work by, William Jones, are:

- Muhammad Mahdī, Histoire de Nader Chah: connu sous le nom de Thahmas Kuli Khan, empereur de Perse / Traduite d'un manuscrit persan, par ordre de Sa majesté le roi de Dannemark. Avec des notes chronologiques, historiques, géographiques. Et un traité sur la poésie orientale, par Mr. Jones, 2 vols (London: Elmsly, 1770), later published in English as The history of the life of Nader Shah: King of Persia. Extracted from an Eastern manuscript, ... With an introduction, containing, I. A description of Asia ... II. A short history of Persia ... and an appendix, consisting of an essay on Asiatick poetry, and the history of the Persian language. To which are added, pieces relative to the French translation / by William Jones (London: T. Cadell, 1773)
- William Jones, Kitāb-i Shakaristān dar naḥvī-i zabān-i Pārsī, taṣnīf-i Yūnus Ūksfurdī = A grammar of the Persian language (London: W. and J. Richardson, 1771) [2nd edn. 1775; 4th edn. London: J. Murray, S. Highley, and J. Sewell, 1797]
- [anonymously], Poems consisting chiefly of translations from the Asiatick languages: To which are added two essays, I. On the poetry of the Eastern nations. II. On the arts, commonly called imitative (Oxford: Clarendon Press, 1772) [2nd edn. London: N. Conant, 1777]
- [William Jones], Poeseos Asiaticæ commentariorum libri sex: cum appendice; subjicitur Limon, seu miscellaneorum liber / auctore Gulielmo Jones (London: T. Cadell, 1774) [repr. Lipsiae: Apud Haeredes Weidmanni et Reichium, 1777]
- [anonymously], An inquiry into the legal mode of suppressing riots: with a constitutional plan of future defence (London: C. Dilly, 1780) [2nd edn, no longer anonymously, London: C. Dilly, 1782]
- William Jones, An essay on the law of bailments (London: Charles Dilly, 1781) [repr. Dublin: Henry Watts, 1790]
- William Jones, The muse recalled, an ode: occasioned by the nuptials of Lord Viscount Althorp and Miss Lavinia Bingham (Strawberry-Hill: Thomas Kirgate, 1781) [repr. Paris: F. A. Didot l'aîné, 1782]
- [anonymously], An ode, in imitation of Callistratus: sung by Mr. Webb, at the Shakespeare Tavern, on Tuesday the 14th day of May, 1782, at the anniversary dinner of the Society for Constitutional Information ([London, 1782])
- William Jones, A speech of William Jones, Esq: to the assembled inhabitants of the counties of Middlesex and Surry, the cities of London and Westminster, and the borough of Southwark. XXVIII May, M. DCC. LXXXII (London: C. Dilly, 1782)
- William Jones, The Moallakát: or seven Arabian poems, which were suspended on the temple at Mecca; with a translation, and arguments (London: P. Elmsly, 1783), https://books.google.com/books?id=qbBCAAAAcAAJ
- [anonymously], The principles of government: in a dialogue between a scholar and a peasant / written by a member of the Society for Constitutional Information ([London: The Society for Constitutional Information, 1783])
- William Jones, A discourse on the institution of a society for enquiring into the history, civil and natural, the antiquities, arts, sciences, and literature of Asia (London: T. Payne and son, 1784)
- William Davies Shipley, The whole of the proceedings at the assizes at Shrewsbury, Aug. 6, 1784: in the cause of the King on Friday August the sixth, 1784, in the cause of the King on the prosecution of William Jones, attorney-at-law, against the Rev. William Davies Shipley, Dean of St. Asaph, for a libel ... / taken in short hand by William Blanchard (London: The Society for Constitutional Information, 1784)
- William Davies Shipley, The whole proceedings on the trial of the indictment: the King, on the prosecution of William Jones, gentleman, against the Rev. William Davies Shipley, Dean of St. Asaph, for a libel, at the assize at Shrewsbury, on Friday the 6th of August, 1784, before the Hon. Francis Buller ... / taken in short-hand by Joseph Gurney (London: M. Gurney, [1784])
- Jones, William (1786). "A dissertation on the orthography of Asiatick words in Roman letters". Asiatick Researches. 1: 1–56.
- [William Jones (ed.)], Lailí Majnún / a Persian poem of Hátifí (Calcutta: M. Cantopher, 1788)
- [William Jones (trans.), Sacontalá: or, The fatal ring: an Indian drama / by Cálidás; translated from the original Sanscrit and Prácrit (London: Edwards, 1790) [repr. Edinburgh: J. Mundell & Co., 1796]
- W. Jones [et al.], Dissertations and miscellaneous pieces relating to the history and antiquities, the arts, sciences, and literature, of Asia, 4 vols (London: G. Nicol, J. Walter, and J. Sewell, 1792) [repr. Dublin: P. Byrne and W. Jones, 1793]
- William Jones, Institutes of Hindu law: or, the ordinances of Menu, according to the gloss of Cullúca. Comprising the Indian system of duties, religious and civil / verbally translated from the original Sanscrit. With a preface, by Sir William Jones (Calcutta: by order of the government, 1796) [repr. London: J. Sewell and J. Debrett, 1796] [trans. by Johann Christian Hüttner, Hindu Gesetzbuch: oder, Menu's Verordnungen nach Cullucas Erläuterung. Ein Inbegriff des indischen Systems religiöser und bürgerlicher Pflichten. / Aus der Sanscrit Sprache wörtlich ins Englische übersetzt von Sir W. Jones, und verteutschet (Weimar, 1797)
- [William Jones], The works of Sir William Jones: In six volumes, ed. by A[nna] M[arie] J[ones], 6 vols (London: G. G. and J. Robinson, and R. H. Evans, 1799) [with two supplemental volumes published 1801], [repr. The works of Sir William Jones / with the life of the author by Lord Teignmouth, 13 vols (London: J. Stockdale and J. Walker, 1807)], vol. 1, vol. 2, vol. 3, vol. 4, vol. 5, vol. 6, supplemental vol. 1, supplemental vol. 2

== See also ==
- Gaston-Laurent Coeurdoux (1691–1779)
- James Burnett, Lord Monboddo (1714–1799)
- Tafazzul Husain Kashmiri (1727–1801)
- Anquetil-Duperron (1731–1805)
- Reuben Burrow (1747–1792)
- James Prinsep (1799–1840)
- Alexander Cunningham (1814–1893)

== Bibliography ==
- Blok, P.J.; Molhuysen, P.C. (1914). "Hamaker, Hendrik Arent". Nieuw Nederlandsch Biografisch Woordenboek. Vol. III. p. 534.
- Campbell, Lyle. (1997). American Indian languages: The historical linguistics of Native America. New York: Oxford University Press. ISBN 0-19-509427-1.
- Edgerton, Franklin (1946). "Sir William Jones, 1746–1794". Journal of the American Oriental Society. 66 (3): 1–17. JSTOR 595570.
- Cannon, Garland H. (1964). Oriental Jones: A Biography of Sir William Jones, 1746–1794. Bombay: Asia Pub. House Indian Council for Cultural Relations.
- Cannon, Garland H. (1979). Sir William Jones: A bibliography of primary and secondary sources. Amsterdam: Benjamins. ISBN 90-272-0998-7.
- Cannon, Garland H.; & Brine, Kevin. (1995). Objects of enquiry: Life, contributions and influence of Sir William Jones. New York: New York University Press. ISBN 0-8147-1517-6.
- Franklin, Michael J. (1995). Sir William Jones. Cardiff: University of Wales Press. ISBN 0-7083-1295-0.
- Jones, William, Sir. (1970). The letters of Sir William Jones. Cannon, Garland H. (Ed.). Oxford: Clarendon Press. ISBN 0-19-812404-X.
- Mukherjee, S. N. (1968). Sir William Jones: A study in eighteenth-century British attitudes to India. London, Cambridge University Press. ISBN 0-521-05777-9.
- Poser, William J. and Lyle Campbell (1992). Indo-european practice and historical methodology, Proceedings of the Eighteenth Annual Meeting of the Berkeley Linguistics Society, pp. 214–236.
- Campbell, Lyle; Poser, William (2008). Language Classification: History and Method. Cambridge University Press. p. 536. ISBN 978-0521880053.
- Chisholm, Hugh, ed. (1911). "Jones, Sir William" . Encyclopædia Britannica. Vol. 15 (11th ed.). Cambridge University Press. p. 501.
- "Sir William Jones (1746–1794): As a Philologist, a Persian Scholar and Founder of Asiatic Society" by R M Chopra, INDO-IRANICA, Vol.66, (1 to 4), 2013.
- Singh, Upinder (2004). The discovery of ancient India: early archaeologists and the beginnings of archaeology. Permanent Black. ISBN 9788178240886.
- Said, Edward W. (1978). Orientalism. Random House. ISBN 9780804153867.
- Anthony, David W. (2010). The Horse, the Wheel, and Language: How Bronze-Age Riders from the Eurasian Steppes Shaped the Modern World. Princeton University Press. ISBN 978-1400831104.
- Davis, Samuel; Aris, Michael (1982). Views of Medieval Bhutan: the diary and drawings of Samuel Davis, 1783. Serindia.
