= Books of authority =

Term for some early legal textbooks

Books of authority is a term used by legal writers to refer to a number of early legal textbooks that are excepted from the rule that textbooks (and all books other than statute or law report) are not treated as authorities by the courts of England and Wales and other common law jurisdictions.

These books are treated by the courts as authoritative statements of the law as it was at the time at which they were written, on the authority of their authors alone. Consequently, they are treated as authoritative statements of the law as it is at the present time, unless it is shown that the law has changed, and may be cited and relied on in court as such.

The statements made in these books are presumed to be evidence of judicial decisions which are no longer extant. The primary reason for this practice is the difficulty associated with ascertaining the law of the medieval and early modern periods.

On the subject of this practice, William Blackstone said:

Besides these reporters, there are also other authors, to whom great veneration and respect is paid by the students of the common law. Such are Glanvill and Bracton, Britton and Fleta, Hengham and Littleton, Statham, Brooke, Fitzherbert and Staundeforde, with some others of antient date; whose treatises are cited as authority, and are evidence that cases have formerly happened, in which such and such points were determined, which are now become settled and first principles. One of the last of these methodical writers in point of time, whose works are of any intrinsic authority in the courts of justice, and do not depend on the strength of their quotations from older authors, is the same learned judge we have just mentioned, Sir Edward Coke;

== Abridgements of the year books ==
=== Fitzherbert ===
- La Graunde Abridgement (1514) by Anthony Fitzherbert.

=== Brooke ===
- La Graunde Abridgement (1568) by Robert Broke.

=== Statham ===
- Epitome Annalium Librorum tempore Henrici Sexti (c. 1495?) by Nicholas Statham.

=== Anonymous ===
- The author of the Abridgement of the Book of Assizes (c. 1510) is unknown. This book is sometimes called Liber Assisarum, after the Year Book from which some of its cases are abridged.

== Treatises, commentaries and institutes ==
=== On the common law ===
==== Glanvill ====
- Tractatus de Legibus et Consuetudinibus regni Angliae. (Treatise on the Laws and Customs of the Realm of England). (c. 1189). Attributed to Ranulf de Glanvill; possibly the work of Hubert Walter.

==== Bracton ====
- De Legibus et Consuetudinibus Angliae (On the Laws and Customs of England) (c. 1250) by Henry de Bracton.

==== Britton ====
- Summa de Legibus Anglie que Vocatur Bretone (Britton). (late 13th century).

==== Fleta ====
- Fleta seu Commentarius Juris Anglicani (Fleta). (ca. 1290).

==== Hengham ====
Traditionally, Ralph de Hengham was believed to be a prolific author of common law procedural treatises, and numerous works were attributed to him. These included not only the eponymous Hengham parva and Hengham magna, but also "Cum sit necessarium", "Exceptiones ad Cassandum Brevia", "Fet Asaver", "Judicium Essoniorum", and "Modus Componendi Brevia", among others. More recent scholarly analysis, however, reveals that only the Parva (a set of lectures directed towards junior-level law students) is conclusively his. Hengham may also have written two consultations.

==== Littleton ====
- Treatise on Tenures (1481) by Thomas de Littleton.

==== Staunford ====
- Plees del Coron (Pleas of the Crown) (1557) by William Staunford

==== Fitzherbert ====
- La Novelle Natura Brevium (New Natura Brevium) (1534) by Anthony Fitzherbert.

==== Coke ====
- Institutes of the Lawes of England (1628-1644) by Sir Edward Coke.

==== Hale ====
- Historia Placitorum Coronæ (The History of the Pleas of the Crown) (1736) by Matthew Hale.

==== Hawkins ====
- Treatise on Pleas of the Crown (1716) by William Hawkins.

==== Foster ====
- Crown Law (1762) by Michael Foster.

==== Blackstone ====
- Commentaries on the Laws of England (1765-1769) by William Blackstone.

=== On equity ===
- Doctor and Student (1528) by Christopher St. Germain.

=== On canon law ===
- Provinciale (1430) by William Lyndwood

=== On the law merchant ===
- Lex Mercatoria (1622) by Gerard de Malynes
