= Fleta =

Fleta is an early treatise on the common law of England. It was written in Latin with the sub-title seu Commentarius juris Anglicani. The anonymous author of the book is sometimes referred to as "Fleta", although this is not in fact a person's name. The book acquired its common title because its preface contains a remark that it could be called "Fleta" because it was written in "Fleta"; however, the meaning of this comment is unclear (see the section on authorship below).

From internal evidence, the work appears to have been written in the reign of Edward I, and it seems to have been completed shortly after the year 1290.

== Authority ==
This book is one of those listed by Blackstone as being authoritative statements of the law at the time at which they were written. Edward Coke cites Fleta as authority in his Institutes in a number of places.

The article on Fleta in the Encyclopædia Britannica Eleventh Edition says that it "is for the most part a poor imitation of" De Legibus et Consuetudinibus Angliae by Henry de Bracton. O. Hood Phillips described it as an "epitome of" that book. G. O. Sayles was able to show that the author of Fleta had a copy of Bracton to hand, but that (like other copies) it was defective in places, and that he was obliged to make many additions and improvements of his own. The Oxford Dictionary of National Biography describes Fleta as "updating and abridging" Bracton.

== Manuscript copies ==
One complete manuscript copy of this book survives from the fourteenth century. It is held by the British Library where its reference is BL, Cotton MS Julius B.viii. A few passages of this book also survive in another manuscript. This is also held by the British Library, where its reference is BL, Cotton MS Nero D.vi.

== Circulation ==
Because few copies survive, it is thought that this book was "not widely read by medieval lawyers."

== Authorship ==
It has often been assumed that the statement that the book was "written in Fleta" means that it was written during the author's confinement in the Fleet prison. It has been conjectured that the author was one of those judges who were imprisoned for malpractices by Edward I. Noël Denholm-Young and Paul Brand have proposed as an alternative candidate one Matthew of the Exchequer, a yeoman of the royal household and lawyer, who was convicted of forgery in 1290 and committed to the Fleet for two years. However, the element "fleet" (meaning both "swift" and "a watercourse") is also found in other place names in England; or the name might simply refer to the swiftness or brevity of the treatise itself.

== Editions ==
The first printed edition of Fleta was published by John Selden in 1647. It included a dissertation written by Selden, the title of which is "Joannis Seldeni ad Fletam dissertatio". A second edition was published, with corrections, in 1685. A new edition of the first of the six books of Fleta was published in 1735, edited by Thomas Clarke, a future Master of the Rolls: however, he published no more. The next edition appeared in France in 1776, edited by David Hoüard: this was based on the previous printed editions, and was abridged in places. All these editions are regarded, for various reasons, as imperfect.

The standard modern edition (with English translation) was edited by H. G. Richardson and G. O. Sayles, and published in three volumes, covering books 1-6, by the Selden Society between 1955 and 1984. A projected fourth volume, intended to include editorial apparatus (notes and indexes), never appeared: this would have been nominally volume 1, and so the three published volumes are numbered 2–4. Volume 4 does include a 17-page "Introduction" by Sayles, which represents the fullest synopsis of scholarly knowledge about the work to date.

== Derivative book ==
The book known as Britton was based on this book.

== See also ==
- Books of authority
