= Liber Assisarum (disambiguation) =

Liber Assisarum may refer to a number of books which relate to judgements of the assize courts:

- Liber Assisarum which is part V of the standard edition of the Year Books
- The Abridgement of the Book of Assizes, an abridgement of the Year Books, which takes a quarter of its cases from Liber Assisarum
