= Violent disorder =

Public offense in England and Wales

Violent disorder is a statutory offence in England and Wales. It is created by section 2(1) of the Public Order Act 1986. Sections 2(1) to (4) of that Act provide:

(1) Where 3 or more persons who are present together use or threaten unlawful violence and the conduct of them (taken together) is such as would cause a person of reasonable firmness present at the scene to fear for their personal safety, each of the persons using or threatening unlawful violence is guilty of violent disorder.
(2) It is immaterial whether the 3 or more use or threaten unlawful violence simultaneously.
(3) No person of reasonable firmness need actually be, or be likely to be, present at the scene.
(4) Violent disorder may be committed in private as well as in public places.

"3 or more persons"

See the following cases:

- R v Mahroof [1988] 88 Cr App R 317, CA
- R v Fleming and Robinson [1989] Crim LR 658, CA
- R v McGuigan and Cameron [1991] Crim LR 719, CA

"Violence"

This word is defined by section 8.

== Mens rea ==
For the mens rea, see section 6(2).

== Indictment ==
As to particularisation, see R v Mahroof [1988], 88 Cr App R 317, CA.

== Alternative verdict ==
See sections 7(3) and (4).

== Arrest ==
Before 1 January 2006 this offence was classified as an arrestable offence by virtue of section 24(1)(b) of the Police and Criminal Evidence Act 1984. See now sections 24 and 24A of that Act, as substituted by the Serious Organised Crime and Police Act 2005.

== Mode of trial and sentence ==
Violent disorder is triable either way. A person guilty of violent disorder is liable on conviction on indictment to imprisonment for a term not exceeding five years, or to a fine, or to both, or, on summary conviction, to imprisonment for a term not exceeding six months, or to a fine not exceeding the statutory maximum, or to both.

The following cases are relevant:

- R v Tomlinson, 157 JP 695, CA
- R v Hebron and Spencer, 11 Cr App R (S) 226, [1989] Crim LR 839, CA
- R v Watson & others (1990) 12 Cr App R (S) 477
- R v Tyler and others, 96 Cr App R 332, [1993] Crim LR 60, CA
- R v Green [1997] 2 Cr App R (S) 191
- R v Chapman (2002) 146 SJ
- R v Rees [2006] 2 Cr App R (S) 20
