= Bibliography of English criminal law =

This is a bibliography of English criminal law. The main statements of current law are set out in:

- Smith, Hogan and Ormerod's Criminal Law
- Archbold Criminal Pleading, Evidence and Practice
- Blackstone's Criminal Practice
- Criminal Law Review
- Criminal Appeal Reports
- Criminal Appeal Reports (Sentencing)

== Practitioner texts ==
=== General texts ===
- Anthony and Berryman's Magistrates' Court Guide
- Archbold Criminal Pleading, Evidence and Practice
- Archbold Magistrates' Courts Criminal Practice
- Blackstone's Criminal Practice
- Crown Court Index
- Stone's Justices' Manual

=== Sentencing ===
- Banks on Sentence
- Thomas' Sentencing Referencer
- Current Sentencing Practice
- Sentencing Principles, Procedure and Practice

=== Specialist areas ===
- Arlidge and Parry on Fraud
- Beldam and Holdam on the Court of Appeal Criminal Division
- Blackstone's Handbook of Youths in the Criminal Courts
- Blackstone's Magistrates' Court Handbook
- Kingsley Napley & 6KBW College Hill: Serious Fraud, Investigation
- Ormerod & Montgomery on Fraud
- Rook and Ward on Sexual Offences
- Sexual Offences Referencer
- Wilkinson's Road Traffic Offences
- Zander on PACE

== Academic and students' texts ==
=== Substantive criminal law ===
- Ashworth's Principles of Criminal Law
- Card, Cross and Jones: Criminal Law
- Clarkson & Keating: Criminal Law - Text & Materials
- Glanville Williams and Dennis Baker: Treatise of Criminal Law
- Simester and Sullivan's Criminal Law: Theory and Doctrine
- Smith, Hogan and Ormerod's Criminal Law

=== Criminal evidence ===
- Roberts & Zuckerman's Criminal Evidence

== Law reports ==
- Cox's Criminal Cases
- Criminal Appeal Reports
- Criminal Appeal Reports (Sentencing)
- Crown Cases Reserved
- Foster's Crown Law
- State trials
- Justice of the Peace Reports
- Road Traffic Reports

== Journals and periodicals ==
- Archbold Review (formerly Archbold News)
- Blackstone’s Criminal Practice Monthly Update
- CrimeLine
- Criminal Law Review
- Criminal Law Week
- Journal of Criminal Law

== Historic works ==
=== Foundational texts ===
- Blackstone's Commentaries, Book IV "Of Public Wrongs" ("Blackstone, Commentaries, iv")
- de Bracton's Laws and Customs of England, Book III "The Crown and Pleas of the Crown"
- Coke's Institutes of the Lawes of England, Part III "Concerning High Treason and other Please of the Crown and Criminal Causes" ("Co 3 Inst")
- East's Treatise of the Pleas of the Crown, Vols 1 and 2 ("East, I/II PC")
- Fortescu's Commendation of the Laws of England
- Foster's Crown Law
- Glanvill's Treatise on the Laws and Customs of the Kingdom of England, Book IV "Criminal Pleas belonging to the Crown"
- Hale's History of the Pleas of the Crown, Vols 1 and 2 ("Hale, I/II PC")
- Hawkins' Treatise of the Pleas of the Crown, Vols 1 and 2 ("Hawkins, I/II PC")

=== 19th and early-20th Century texts ===
- Archbold Criminal Pleading, Evidence and Practice
- Russell on Crime
- Harris's Criminal Law
- Kenny's Outlines of Criminal Law
- Stephen's Digest of the Criminal Law
- Williams's Textbook of Criminal Law and Criminal Law: The General Part

== Criminal Law Revision Committee Reports ==
- 1st Report, Indecency with Children (1959), Cmnd 835. 5 pp.
- 2nd Report, Suicide (1960), Cmnd 1187. 9 pp.
- 3rd Report, Criminal Procedure (Insanity) (1963), Cmnd 2149. 23 pp.
- 4th Report, Order of Closing Speeches (1963), Cmnd 2148. 6 pp.
- 5th Report, Criminal Procedure (Jurors) (1964), Cmnd 2349. 5 pp.
- 6th Report, Perjury and Attendance of Witnesses (1964), Cmnd 2465. 31 pp.
- 7th Report, Felonies and Misdemeanours (1965), Cmnd 2659. 57 pp.
- 8th Report, Theft and Related Offences (1966), Cmnd 2977. 139 pp.
- 9th Report, Evidence: Written Statements, Formal Admissions and Notices of Alibi (1966), Cmnd 3145. 23 pp.
- 10th Report, Secrecy of Jury Room (1968), Cmnd 3750. 6 pp.
- 11th Report, Evidence (General) (1972), Cmnd 4991. 258 pp.
- 12th Report, Penalty for Murder (1973), Cmnd 5184 ISBN 0101518404. 23 pp.
- Working Paper, Section 16 of the Theft Act 1968 (1974) ISBN 9780113405688. 35 pp.
- Working Paper, Offences Against the Person (1976). 73–74 pp.
- 13th Report, Section 16 of the Theft Act 1968 (1977), Cmnd 6733 ISBN 9780113405688. 34–35 pp.
- 14th Report, Offences Against the Person (1980), Cmnd 7844 ISBN 9780101784405. 150 pp.
- Working Paper, Sexual Offences (1980/1982). 63 pp.
- Working Paper, Offences Relating to Prostitution and Allied Offences (1982) ISBN 011340784X. 57 pp.
- 15th Report, Sexual Offences (1984), Cmnd 9213 ISBN 9780101921305. 105 pp.
- 16th Report, Prostitution in the Street (1984), Cmnd 9329 ISBN 9780101932905. 37 pp.
- 17th Report, Prostitution – Off-Street Activities (1985), Cmnd 9688. 30 pp.
- 18th Report, Conspiracy to Defraud (1986), Cmnd 9873 ISBN 9780101987301. 15 pp.

The seventh report was implemented by the Criminal Law Act 1967 and the Criminal Law Act (Northern Ireland) 1967. The eighth report was implemented by the Theft Act 1968 and the Theft Act (Northern Ireland) 1969.

== Law Commission Reports and Papers ==
=== Abolition of Ancient Offences: Law Com. No 3 ===
- LC 3 (1966). Report on Abolition of Ancient Offences.

=== Imputed Criminal Intent: Law Co. No. 10 ===
- LC 10 (1967). Report on Imputed Criminal Intent.

=== Damage to Property: Law Com. No. 29 ===
- LCCP 23 (1969). Working Paper on Malicious Damage.
- LC 29 (1970). Report on Offences of Damage to Property.

=== Strict Liability ===
- LCCP 30 (1970). Working Paper on Strict Liability and the Enforcement of the Factories Act 1961.

=== Forgery and Counterfeit Currency: Law Com. No. 55 ===
- LCCP 26 (1970). Working Paper on Forgery.
- LC 55 (1973). Report on Forgery and Counterfeit Currency.

=== Parties, Complicity and Liability for the Acts of Another ===
- LCCP 43 (1972). Working Paper on Parties, Complicity and Liability for the Acts of Another.

=== Criminal Liability of Corporations ===
- LCCP 44 (1972). Working Paper on Criminal Liability of Corporations.

=== Inchoate Offences: Conspiracy, Attempt and Incitement ===
- LCCP 50 (1973). Working Paper on Inchoate Offences: Conspiracy, Attempt and Incitement.

=== Entering and Remaining on Property ===
- LCCP 54 (1974). Working Paper on Offences of Entering and Remaining on Property.

=== Conspiracy and Criminal Law Reform: Law Com. No. 76 ===
- LCCP 56 (1974). Working Paper on Conspiracy to Defraud.
- LCCP 57 (1974). Working Paper on Conspiracies Relating to Morals and Decency.
- LCCP 63 (1975). Working Paper on Conspiracies to Effect a Public Mischief and to Commit a Civil Wrong.
- LC 76 (1976). Report on Conspiracy and Criminal Law Reform.

=== Defences of General Application: Law Com. No. 83 ===
- LCCP 55 (1974). Working Paper on Defences of General Application.
- LC 83 (1977). Report on Defences of General Application.

=== Treason, Sedition and Allied Offences ===
- LCCP 72 (1977). Working Paper on Treason, Sedition and Allied Offences.

=== Mental Element in Crime: Law Com. No. 89 ===
- LCCP 31 (1970). Working Paper on the Mental Element in Crime.
- LC 89 (1978). Report on the Mental Element in Crime.

=== Territorial and Extraterritorial Extent of the Criminal Law: Law Com. No. 91 ===
- LCCP 29 (1970). Working Paper on the Territorial and Extraterritorial Extent of the Criminal Law.
- LC 91 (1978). Report on the Territorial and Extra-Territorial Extent of the Criminal Law.

=== Interference with the Course of Justice: Law Com. No. 96 ===
- LCCP 33 (1970). Working Paper on Perjury and Kindred Offences.
- LCCP 62 (1975). Working Paper on Offences Relating to the Administration of Justice.
- LC 96 (1979). Report on Offences Relating to Interference with the Course of Justice.

=== Attempt and Impossibility in Relation to Attempt, Conspiracy and Incitement: Law Com. No. 102 ===
- LC 102 (1980). Report on Attempt and Impossibility in Relation to Attempt, Conspiracy and Incitement.

=== Public Order Offences: Law Com. No. 123 ===
- LCCP 82 (1982). Working Paper on Offences against Public Order.
- LC 123 (1983). Report on Offences Relating to Public Order.

=== Offences against Religion and Public Worship: Law Com. No. 145 ===
- LCCP 89 (1981). Working Paper on Offences against Religion and Public Worship.
- LC 145 (1985). Report on Offences against Religion and Public Worship.

=== Criminal Libel: Law Com. No. 149 ===
- LCCP 84 (1982). Working Paper on Criminal Libel.
- LC 149 (1985). Report on Criminal Libel.

=== Poison Pen Letters: Law Com. No. 147 ===
- LC 147 (1985). Report on Poison Pen Letters.

=== Codification of the Criminal Law: Law Com. Nos 143 and 177 ===
Sources:

- LC 143 (1985). Codification of the Criminal Law: a Report to the Law Commission.
- LC177(1) (1989). A Criminal Code for England and Wales (Vol. 1: Report and Draft Criminal Code Bill).
- LC177(2) (1989). A Criminal Code for England and Wales (Vol. 2: Commentary on Draft Criminal Code Bill).
- Hansard Debates, House of Lords, Vol 508 (22 May 1989), Col 2 56 ‘Law Commission Report No 177’.

=== Computer Misuse: Law Com. No.186 ===
- LCCP 110 (1988). Working Paper on Computer Misuse.
- LC 186 (1989). Report on Computer Misuse.

=== Rape within Marriage: Law Com. No. 205 ===
- LCCP 116 (1990). Working Paper on Rape within Marriage.
- LC 205 (1992). Report on Rape within Marriage.

=== Offences against the Person and General Principles: Law Com. No. 218 ===
- LCCP 122 (1992). Consultation Paper on Offences against the Person and General Principles.
- LC 218 (1993). Report on Offences against the Person and General Principles.

=== Conspiracy to Defraud: Law Com. No. 228 ===
- LCCP 104 (1987). Working Paper on Conspiracy to Defraud.
- LC 228 (1995). Report on Conspiracy to Defraud.

=== Intoxication and Criminal Liability: Law Com. No. 299 ===
- LCCP 127 (1993). Consultation Paper on Intoxication and Criminal Liability.
- LC 229 (1995). Report on Intoxication and Criminal Liability.

=== Consent and Offences Against the Person ===
- LCCP 134 (1994). Consultation Paper on Consent and Offences Against the Person.

=== The Year and a Day Rule in Homicide: Law Com. No. 230 ===
- LCCP 136 (1994). Consultation Paper on The Year and a Day Rule in Homicide.
- LC 230 (1995). Report on The Year and a Day Rule in Homicide.

=== Involuntary Manslaughter: Law Com. No. 237 ===
- LCCP 135 (1994). Consultation Paper on Involuntary Manslaughter.
- LC 237 (1996). Report on Involuntary Manslaughter.

=== Consent in the Criminal Law ===
- LCCP 139 (1994). Consultation Paper on Consent in the Criminal Law.

=== Corruption: Law Com. No. 248 ===
- LCCP 145 (1997). Consultation Paper on Corruption.
- LC 248 (1998). Report on Corruption.

=== Misuse of Trade Secrets ===
- LCCP 150 (1997). Consultation Paper on Misuse of Trade Secrets.

=== Fraud: Law Com. No.276 ===
- LCCP 155 (1999). Consultation Paper on Fraud and Deception.
- LC 276 (2002). Report on Fraud.

=== Partial Defences to Murder: Law Com. No. 290 ===
- LCCP 173 (2003). Consultation Paper on Partial Defences to Murder.
- LC 290 (2004). Report on Partial Defences to Murder Report.

=== Murder, Manslaughter and Infanticide: Law Com. No.304 ===
- LCCP 177 (2005). Consultation Paper on A New Homicide Act for England and Wales?.
- LC 304 (2006). Report on Murder, Manslaughter and Infanticide.

=== Participating in Crime: Law Com. Nos 300 ===
Source: and 305

- LCCP 131 (1993). Consultation Paper on Assisting and Encouraging Crime.
- LC 300 (2006). Report on Inchoate Liability for Assisting and Encouraging Crime.
- LC 305 (2007). Report on Participating in Crime.

=== Bribery: Law Com. No. 313 ===
- LCCP 185 (2007). Consultation Paper on Reforming Bribery.
- LC 313 (2008). Report on Reforming Bribery.

=== Intoxication and Criminal Liability: Law Com. No. 314 ===
- LC 314 (2009). Report on Intoxication and Criminal Liability.

=== Insanity and Automatism ===
- (2012). Scoping Paper on Insanity and Automatism.
- (2013). Discussion Paper on Insanity and Automatism.

=== Kidnapping: Law Com. No. 355 ===
- LCCP 200 (2011). Consultation Paper on Kidnapping.
- LC 355 (2014). Report on Kidnapping and Related Offences.

=== Public Nuisance and Outraging Public Decency: Law Com. No. 358 ===
- LC 358 (2015). Report on Public Nuisance and Outraging Public Decency.

=== Offences against the Person: Law Com. No. 361 ===
- LCCP 217 (2014). Scoping Consultation Paper on Reform of Offences against the Person.
- LC 361 (2015). Report on Reform of Offences against the Person.

=== Firearms: Law Com. No. 363 ===
- LCCP 224 (2015). Scoping Paper on Firearms Law.
- LC 363 (2015). Report on Firearms Law – Reforms to Address Pressing Problems.

=== Protection of Official Data: Law Com. No. 395 ===
- LCCP 230 (2017). Consultation Paper on Protection of Official Data.
- LC 395 (2020). Report on Protecting Official Data.

=== Misconduct in Public Office: Law Com. No.397 ===
- LCCP 229 (2016). Consultation Paper on Reforming Misconduct in Public Office.
- LC 397 (2020). Report on Misconduct in Public Office.

=== Abusive and Offensive Online Communications: Law Com. Nos 381 ===
Source: and 399

- LC 381 (2018). Scoping Paper on Abusive and Offensive Online Communications.
- LCCP 249 (2020). Consultation Paper on Harmful Online Communications: The Criminal Offences.
- LC 399 (2021). Report on Modernising Communications Offences.

=== Hate Crime: Law Com. Nos 348 ===
Source: and 402

- LC 348 (2014). Report on Hate Crime: Should the Current Offences Be Extended?.
- LCCP 250 (2020). Consultation Paper on Hate Crime Laws.
- LC 402 (2021). Final Report on Hate Crime Laws.

=== Automated Vehicles: Law Com. No.404 ===
- LCCP 240 (2018). Preliminary Consultation Paper on Automated Vehicles.
- LCCP 244 (2019). Second Consultation Paper on Automated Vehicles.
- LCCP 245 (2020). Third Consultation Paper on Automated Vehicles.
- LC 404 (2022). Report on Automated Vehicles.

=== Corporate Criminal Liability ===
- (2022). Options Paper on Corporate Criminal Liability.

=== Current Ongoing Projects (as at November 2025) ===
- Consent in the criminal law.
- Offences against dead bodies.
- The defence of insanity.
- Law of homicide.
- Contempt of Court.
- Defences for victims of domestic abuse who kill their abusers.

== Oxford Monographs on Criminal Law and Justice ==
- Horder (1992). Provocation and Responsibility.
- McConville, Hodgson, Bridges & Pavlovic (1994). Standing Accused.
- Mackay (1995). Mental Condition Defences in the Criminal Law.
- Jackson & Doran (1995). Judge Without Jury.
- Fionda (1995). Public Prosecutors and Discretion.
- von Hirsch (1996). Censure and Sanctions.
- Simester & Smith (1996). Harm and Culpability.
- Choo (1996). Hearsay and Confrontation in Criminal Trials.
- Duff (1997). Criminal Attempts.
- Robinson (1997). Structure and Function in Criminal Law.
- Ashworth & Wasik (1998). Fundamentals of Sentencing Theory.
- Smith (1998). Lawyers, Legislators and Theorists.
- Norrie (2000). Punishment, Responsibility, and Justice.
- Ashworth & Mitchell (2000). Rethinking English Homicide Law.
- Wells (2001). Corporations and Criminal Responsibility.
- Redmayne (2001). Expert Evidence and Criminal Justice.
- Shute & Simester (2002). Criminal Law Theory.
- Ellison (2002). The Adversarial Process and the Vulnerable Witness.
- Temkin (2002). Rape and the Legal Process.
- Hirst (2003). Jurisdiction and the Ambit of the Criminal Law.
- Lazarus (2004). Contrasting Prisoners’ Rights.
- Horder (2004). Excusing Crime.
- Simester (2005). Appraising Strict Liability.
- Tadros (2005). Criminal Responsibility.
- Duff & Green (2005). Defining Crimes.
- von Hirsch & Ashworth (2005). Proportionate Sentencing.
- Lewis (2006). Delayed Prosecution for Childhood Sexual Abuse.
- Leverick (2006). Killing in Self-Defence.
- Green (2006). Lying, Cheating, and Stealing.
- Tadros (2007). Criminal Responsibility (PB).
- Horder (2007). Excusing Crime (PB).
- Erin & Ost (2007). The Criminal Justice System and Health Care.
- Lippke (2007). Rethinking Imprisonment.
- Ho (2008). A Philosophy of Evidence Law.
- Choo (2008). Abuse of Process and Judicial Stays of Criminal Proceedings.
- Dempsey (2009). Prosecuting Domestic Violence.
- Lippke (2011). The Ethics of Plea Bargaining.
- Horder (2012). Homicide and the Politics of Law Reform.
- Loughnan (2012). Manifest Madness.
- Ramsay (2012). The Insecurity State.
- Ashworth & Zedner (2014). Preventive Justice.
- Ashworth & Zedner (2015). Preventive Justice (PB).
- Redmayne (2015). Character in the Criminal Trial.
- Lacey (2016). In Search of Criminal Responsibility.
- Lacey (2016). In Search of Criminal Responsibility (PB).
- Carvalho (2017). The Preventive Turn in Criminal Law.
- Alldridge (2017). Criminal Justice and Taxation.
- Horder (2018). Criminal Misconduct in Office.
- Mackay & Brookbanks (2018). Fitness to Plead.
- Hoyle & Sato (2019). Reasons to Doubt.
- Green (2020). Criminalizing Sex.
- Aliverti (2021). Policing the Borders Within.
- Horder (2022). Criminal Fraud and Election Disinformation.
- Picinali (2022). Justice In-Between.
- Mackay & Brookbanks (2022). The Insanity Defence.
- King & Hendry (2023). Civil Recovery of Criminal Property.
- Helm (2024). How Juries Work.
- Dripps (2026). Sentencing Discretion and the Constitution.
- Manikis (2026). Victims as Agents of State Accountability.
