= Foster's Crown Law =

English law treatise

A Report of Some Proceedings on the Commission for the Trial of the Rebels in the Year 1746, in the County of Surry; And of Other Crown Cases: to which are Added Discourses Upon a Few Branches of the Crown Law, usually called simply Crown Law or Crown Cases, is an influential treatise on the English criminal law. It was written by Sir Michael Foster (1689–1763), judge of the King's Bench and later edited by his nephew, Michael Dodson, barrister at law. It was first published in 1762. The third edition, edited by Dodson, and with an appendix containing three cases omitted from the original, was published in 1792 and seems to have been republished in 1809.

The book is divided into two sections. The first part, The Report, usually called Crown Cases, is a series of law reports. The second part, The Discourses, usually called Crown Law is essentially a textbook. The Report covers the trials of the participants in the second Jacobite Rising of 1745. In 1925, the English Reports series reprinted the Report and Appendix of the 1809 edition, but not the Discourses.

== See also ==
- Nominate reports
- Books of authority
- Woolmington v DPP
- Bibliography of English criminal law
