= Henry Gerald Richardson =

English historian and civil servant (1884–1974)

Henry Gerald Richardson (23 September 1884 – 3 or 4 September 1974) was an English historian and civil servant.

== Early life and civil service career ==
Born in 1884 in London, Richardson's father was a printer, coin collector and amateur horticulturist. His brother John was a mining engineer and the author of Metal Mining (1974). Richardson attended the City of Westminster School and, at the age of 16, entered HM Civil Service in 1899 as a boy clerk. He joined the established grades in 1902 and worked in the Colonial Office from 1903 to 1909. In 1909, he moved to the Board of Agriculture and Fisheries and was promoted to Principal in 1921. Two years later, he moved to the Research Advisory and Machinery Branch, where he remained until 1931. In 1932, he was promoted to Assistant Secretary and worked in the Markets Branch; in 1934, he was appointed Principal Establishments Officer and Assistant Secretary and in 1936 he became Secretary of the Tithe Redemption Commission. He retired in 1949, though retained his secretarial duties until 1957.

== Academia ==
Alongside his full-time civil service career, Richardson began studying at evening classes at Birkeck College in 1905, but switched to studying economics at the London School of Economics the following year. He graduated in 1909 with a BSc; at the time, this required extensive research into medieval history (for which he received first-class honours). He received two prizes. He studied for an MA there (awarded in 1912) and assisted Hubert Hall with bibliographic projects. This postgraduate degree explored English medieval economic thought and in 1912 his researches earned him the Royal Historical Society's Alexander Prize. In the early 1920s he carried out intensive research into the history of usury in medieval England and France, but he never brought the project to completion. In the 1920s, he also wrote articles on the history of medieval local government in England, British forest law, the Exchequer year and the legal year books and plea rolls. He spent years working on a history of the administration of medieval London, but it never appeared in print. Indeed, Richardson had a tendency to begin projects but never finish them or push them into print.

In 1926, Richardson travelled to France to carry out research, which resulted in the publication of one of his most important articles: "The Origins of Parliament", which appeared in the Transactions of the Royal Historical Society in 1928. The year before, he had begun collaborating with the historian G. O. Sayles, with whom he worked on numerous projects relating to the history of the English parliament, laws and government. Together, they authored or edited Parliaments and Councils of Medieval Ireland (1947), The Irish Parliament in the Middle Ages (1952), The Governance of Medieval England (1963), The Administration of Ireland, 1172–1377 (1964) and Law and Legislation in Medieval England (1966). A selection of their articles were published as English Parliament in the Middle Ages in 1981. They both also edited Select Cases of Procedure without Writ in the Reign of Henry III (1941) and the 13th-century treatise Fleta, which was published in two volumes in 1955 and 1972. Richardson alone wrote articles and reviews as well as The English Jewry under the Norman Kings (1960); he was involved in studying the medieval legal scholar Henry de Bracton's treatise. In 1968, he stopped writing. He had been a governor of Birkbeck College from 1921 until 1937 and was elected a fellow in 1960. He had been elected a fellow of the British Academy in 1952.

== Personal life ==
Richardson's first wife had died in 1950 and he remarried that year. His daughter Helen (married name Suggett) was also a historian, who, like her father, received the Alexander Medal in 1945 for her essay "The Use of French in England in the Later Middle Ages". Richardson died in 1974.
