= Ashworth's Principles of Criminal Law =

1991 book by Andrew Ashworth and Jeremy Horder

Ashworth's Principles of Criminal Law is a textbook on criminal law in England and Wales. The principles of criminal law expounded in the book are normative.

The text was originally written by Professor Andrew Ashworth (first to sixth editions: 1991–2009). The seventh edition (2013) was co-written with Professor Jeremy Horder and the eighth to tenth (2016, 2016, 2022) editions were written by Horder alone.

== Editions ==
1. Ashworth, Andrew (1991). Principles of Criminal Law. Clarendon Press. ISBN 9780198761440.
2. Ashworth, Andrew (1995). Principles of Criminal Law (2nd ed.). Clarendon Press. ISBN 9780198763673.
3. Ashworth, Andrew (1999). Principles of Criminal Law (3rd ed.). OUP. ISBN 9780198765578.
4. Ashworth, Andrew (2003). Principles of Criminal Law (4th ed.). OUP. ISBN 9780199259809.
5. Ashworth, Andrew (2006). Principles of Criminal Law (5th ed.). OUP. ISBN 9780199281145.
6. Ashworth, Andrew (2009). Principles of Criminal Law (6th ed.). OUP. ISBN 9780199541973.
7. Ashworth, Andrew; Horder, Jeremy (2013). Principles of Criminal Law (Seventh ed.). OUP. ISBN 9780199672684.
8. Horder, Jeremy (2016). Ashworth's Principles of Criminal Law (Eighth ed.). OUP. ISBN 9780198753070.
9. Horder, Jeremy (2019). Ashworth's Principles of Criminal Law (Ninth ed.). OUP. ISBN 9780198777663.
10. Horder, Jeremy (2022). Ashworth's Principles of Criminal Law (Tenth ed.). OUP. ISBN 9780192897381.

== Reception ==
Anthony Duff called the book valuable.

== See also ==
- List of main criminal law texts in England and Wales
