= G. O. Sayles =

English historian (1901–1994)

George Osborne Sayles (21 April 1901 – 28 February 1994) was an English historian best known for his work on the medieval English law courts and the early English Parliaments.

== Early life ==
Sayles was raised and educated in Derbyshire. He attended Ilkeston Grammar School. He studied at the University of Glasgow and then University College London.

== Career ==
G.O. Sayles was an outstandingly original and productive historian whose publications over more than 60 years radically changed understanding of the medieval British parliament and advanced very considerably knowledge of the medieval English law courts.

During Sayles's lifetime he held the following positions: Assistant in History, Glasgow University 1924-25, Lecturer 1925-34, Senior Lecturer 1934-45; Professor of Modern History, Queen's University Belfast 1945-53; Burnett-Fletcher Chair of History, University of Aberdeen 1953-62; Vice-President, Selden Society 1954-86; FBA 1962; Kenan Professor of History, New York University 1967-68.

Sayles's most important works were The King's Parliament of England (1974) and his work on the modern edition of the late thirteenth-century legal treatise known as Fleta published by the Selden Society in three volumes (of a projected four).

Sayles's longtime writing partner was Henry Gerald Richardson (d. 1974).

== Personal life ==
In 1936 Sayles married Agnes Sutherland, from Glasgow. They had a son (Michael) and daughter (Hilary).

== Partial bibliography ==
- The Medieval Foundations of England (1st edn, 1948)
- The King's Parliament of England (1974) ISBN 071315781X
- Sayles, G. O. (1982). Scripta Diversa. History Series. Vol. 15. London: Hambledon Press. ISBN 0907628125.
- The Functions of the Medieval Parliament of England (1987) ISBN 0907628923

in collaboration with H.G. Richardson:

- The Irish Parliament in the Middle Ages (1952)
- Richardson, H. G.; Sayles, G. O., eds. (1955). Fleta: Volume II (Prologue, Book I, Book II). Selden Society. Vol. 72. London: Selden Society.
- Richardson, H. G.; Sayles, G. O., eds. (1972). Fleta: Volume III (Book III and Book IV). Selden Society. Vol. 89. London: Selden Society.
- Sayles, G. O., ed. (1984). Fleta: Volume IV (Book V and Book VI). Selden Society. Vol. 99. London: Selden Society.
- The Administration of Ireland, 1172–1377 (1963)
- The English Parliament in the Middle Ages (1981) ISBN 0950688215
