= Woolmington v DPP =

House of Lords law case

Woolmington v Director of Public Prosecutions
- Court: House of Lords
- Full case name: Reginald Woolmington v Director for Public Prosecutions
- Decided: 23 May 1935
- Citations: [1935] UKHL 1 [1935] AC 462 (1936) 25 Cr App R 72
- Legislation cited: Criminal Appeal Act 1907 s. 1 Criminal Appeal Act 1907 s. 4 Criminal Evidence Act 1898

Court membership
- Judges sitting: Viscount Sankey; Lord Hewart; Lord Atkin; Lord Tomlin; Lord Wright

Keywords
- Burden of proof in crime; Intention and evidence of possible accident; Jury directions; Murder

Woolmington v DPP [1935] AC 462 is a landmark House of Lords case, where the presumption of innocence was re-consolidated (for application across the Commonwealth).

In criminal law the case identifies the metaphorical "golden thread" running through that domain of the presumption of innocence.

== Facts ==
Reginald Woolmington was a 21-year-old farm labourer from Castleton, Dorset. He married 17-year-old Violet in August 1934. She gave birth to his child in October. Shortly after, the couple fell out. On 22 November 1934, Violet left the matrimonial home to live with her mother. On 10 December, Reginald stole a double-barrelled shotgun and cartridges from his employer and sawed off the barrel. He then cycled to his mother-in-law's house where he shot and killed Violet. He was arrested on 10 December 1934 and was charged with murder.

Woolmington's defence was that he did not intend to kill and thus lacked the necessary mens rea. Specifically, he claimed that he had wanted to win her back and planned to scare her by threatening to kill himself if she refused. He had attempted to show her the gun which discharged accidentally, killing her instantly.

== Trial ==
Woolmington was tried for murder on two separate occasions, which did not violate the rule of double jeopardy. At his first trial, heard at the Taunton Assizes in January 1935, Woolmington made for the first time his claim about the gun accidentally discharging. The Director of Public Prosecutions subsequently explained to colleagues that this defence had come as a surprise and had been difficult to respond to. The trial judge, Mr Justice Finlay directed the jury that:

The case for the prosecution is deliberate shooting. The Defence is: Not guilty of murder. They prove the killing, and in the absence of explanation that is murder. The Defence say: Excusable because accidental. Consider whether you entertain the slightest doubt that this was a deliberate killing … If you have no doubt, it is your duty to convict … If the result of a dispassionate survey is to leave a reasonable doubt in your minds, then your duty as well as your pleasure is to acquit.

In other words, they must acquit if the prosecution had failed to prove Woolmington's guilt beyond reasonable doubt. The jury failed to agree a verdict, and were discharged after 65 minutes.

At the Bristol Assizes, Mr Justice Swift ruled that the case was so strong against him that the burden of proof was on him to show that the shooting was accidental. The jury deliberated for 69 minutes. On 14 February 1935 he was convicted (and automatically sentenced to death).

On appeal to the Court of Criminal Appeal, his defence team argued that the judge had mis-directed the jury. Lord Justice Avory refused leave to appeal, relying on a passage of Foster's Crown Law (1762):

In every charge of murder, the fact of killing being first proved, all the circumstances of accident, necessity, or infirmity are to be satisfactorily proved by the prisoner, unless they arise out of the evidence produced against him; for the law presumeth the fact to have been founded in malice, until the contrary appeareth. And very right it is, that the law should so presume. The defendant in this instance standeth upon just the same foot that every other defendant doth: the matters tending to justify, excuse, or alleviate, must appear in evidence before he can avail himself of them.

The Attorney-General (Sir Thomas Inskip) then gave a fiat (intervention on paper) to allow an appeal to the highest court.

The issue brought to that court was whether the statement of law in Foster's Crown Law was correct when it said that if a death occurred, it is presumed to be murder unless proved otherwise.

Stating the judgment for a unanimous Court, Viscount Sankey made his famous "Golden thread" speech:

Throughout the web of the English Criminal Law one golden thread is always to be seen that it is the duty of the prosecution to prove the prisoner's guilt subject to... the defence of insanity and subject also to any statutory exception. If, at the end of and on the whole of the case, there is a reasonable doubt, created by the evidence given by either the prosecution or the prisoner... the prosecution has not made out the case and the prisoner is entitled to an acquittal. No matter what the charge or where the trial, the principle that the prosecution must prove the guilt of the prisoner is part of the common law of England and no attempt to whittle it down can be entertained.

He spent much time contrasting the position under the criminal law at the time when the decisions relied upon in Foster's Crown Law were handed down, and latest precedent. An accused was not even entitled to be represented in court if charged with a misdemeanour. Moreover it was not until 1898 in the post-Civil War system that the accused who was not a peer or barrister was permitted to give evidence on their own behalf.

The conviction was quashed, and Woolmington was acquitted. He was released three days before his scheduled execution, still 21 years old.

== Aftermath ==
When it was announced that his conviction was quashed, contemporary newspaper reports indicate that Woolmington simply stood there stupefied, unable to understand what was happening. It was only when it was repeated to him for the third time that his conviction had been quashed that he appeared to understand that he had been reprieved. After he recovered from his ordeal Woolmington moved to Jersey where he had worked picking potatoes. One source records that he then lived in "quiet obscurity". There do not appear to be any further newspaper reports relating to him after 1935. It is possible that he may have died during World War II five years later. Due to many people of his name from Dorset his later years are unconfirmed.

His and Violet's son was briefly adopted outside of the family; but after his past was discovered, sent to a Doctor Barnardo's home. He was then re-adopted. He found his blood parentage when in his 60s.

== Reception ==
Leading criminal lawyer, Professor Sir John Smith QC, commented: "Never, in my opinion, has the House of Lords done a more noble deed in the field of criminal law than on that day."

Lord Goddard CJ was among critics.
