= A Treatise of Pleas of the Crown =

Book by William Hawkins

A Treatise of Pleas of the Crown; or, a system of the principal matters relating to that subject, digested under proper heads (or Pleas of the Crown for short), is an influential treatise on the criminal law of England, written by William Hawkins, serjeant-at-law, and later edited by John Curwood, barrister. It was first published in 1716 and went through eight editions, the last of which was published in 1824.

It is often cited as "Hawk.P.C." or some similar variation on this.

In 1847, John Gage Marvin said:

"There are very few juridical writers, whose compilations are more full of useful knowledge, or more methodically digested, even down to the minute sub-divisions, than the Pleas of the Crown, by Mr. Serj. Hawkins. In this admired and authoritative work the student will readily find information in almost every point of Law relating to Crimes and Punishments." The 3d ed., 2 vols., fol., 1739, was edited by G. L. Scott, and the fifth and sixth editions were very much enlarged by Thomas Leach. Mr. Curwood cut off "some of Leach's excrescences," and added a good selection of leading Cases, rarely referring to the rulings of a single judge. Hawkins' Treatise was formerly much esteemed, but later publications upon Crown Law have somewhat impaired its value as a practical work. 2 Woodes. Lec. 488, n; Brooke's Bib. Leg. Ang. 241; Bridg. Leg. Bib.; Warren's Law Stu. 620; 3 Wilson's Works, 18; 1 Brod. & Bing. 570-97; 1 Barn. & Ald. 244; 1 Barn. & Cres. 274; 1 Kent's Com. 511.

In 1925, Percy Henry Winfield said: "In his preface, Hawkins, after a panegyric on the existing criminal law which staggers any modern lawyer accustomed to something less brutal, points out the imperfections of previous attempts to expound it, and states his own object to be the reduction of all the laws relating to it under one scheme. His first book deals with crimes, his second with the manner of bringing criminals to punishment. The work, as a whole, is very comprehensive, and, for a book of that period, well arranged. It shows plenty of critical ability, and in general it is a reliable statement of the law as Hawkins knew it. On historical points, it occasionally requires verification, and in the editions, which we have used, it is often overloaded with marginal references, some of which are untraceable and others worthless; but it may be that these are due to later editors. Hawkins’s work is deservedly of high authority and is still cited. It was the starting-point of modern laborious treatises on the criminal law which are valuable as digests of the subject, but which make no advance on Hawkins’s plan or style, and are not invariably reliable on matters of history."

== See also ==
- Books of authority
- Bibliography of English criminal law
