= The Journal of Criminal Law =

British criminal law journal

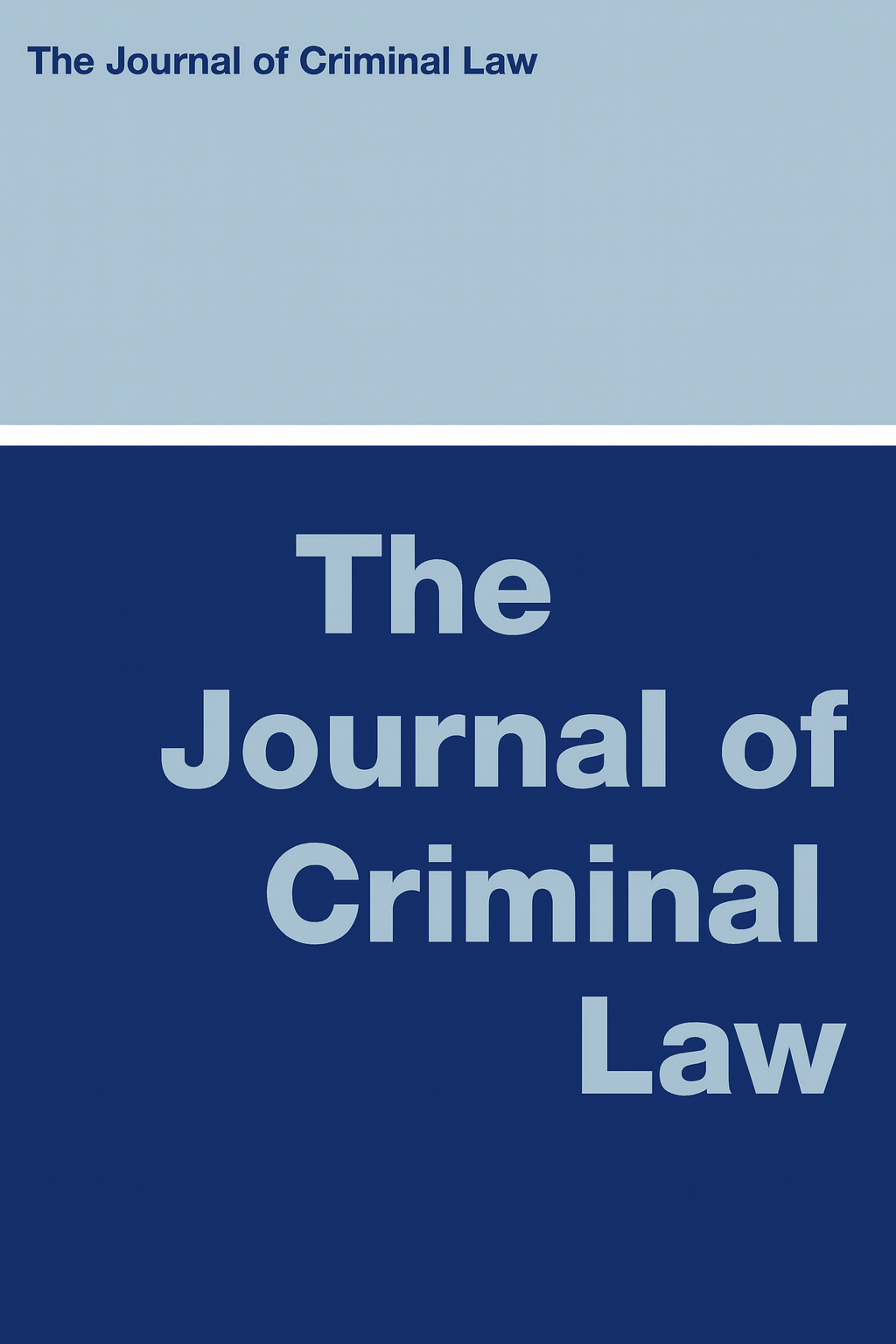
- Discipline: Criminal law
- Language: English
- Edited by: Alan Reed

Publication details
- History: Since 1937
- Publisher: SAGE Publications
- Frequency: Bimonthly
- Open access: Hybrid
- Impact factor: 1.0 (2024)

Standard abbreviations
- ISO 4: J. Crim. Law

Indexing
- ISSN: 0022-0183 (print); 1740-5580 (web)
- LCCN: 38025679
- OCLC no.: 615542610

Links
- Journal homepage; Online access; Online archive

The Journal of Criminal Law is a peer-reviewed law review which was established in 1937 and is concerned with criminal law. It is published by SAGE Publications and provides analysis of criminal law, case law, and criminal justice developments. The editor-in-chief is Alan Reed (Northumbria University). The editorial to the first edition explained that the journal was "offered to the legal profession in the belief that a periodical devoted solely to the subject of criminal law will find a large number of interested readers".

== Abstracting and indexing ==
The journal is abstracted and indexed in EBSCO databases, Emerging Sources Citation Index, and Scopus. According to the Journal Citation Reports, the journal has a 2024 impact factor of 1.0.

== See also ==
- Criminal Law Review
- Bibliography of English criminal law
