= Michael Dodson =

English lawyer and writer

Michael Dodson (1732–1799) was an English lawyer and writer on religious subjects.

== Life ==
The only son of Joseph Dodson, dissenting minister at Marlborough, Wiltshire, he was born there in September 1732. He was educated at Marlborough Grammar School, and then, in accordance with the advice of Sir Michael Foster, justice of the King's Bench, was entered at the Middle Temple 31 August 1754. He practised for many years as a special pleader; and was finally called to the bar on 4 July 1783. In 1770 he had been appointed one of the commissioners of bankruptcy. This post he held until his death, at his house, Boswell Court, Carey Street on 13 November 1799.

In 1778 Dodson married his cousin Elizabeth Hawkes, also of Marlborough.

== Works ==
Dodson's legal writings were an edition with notes and references of Sir Michael Foster's Report of some Proceedings on the Commission for the Trial of Rebels in the year 1746 in the County of Surrey, and of other crown cases (3rd edition 1792). In 1795 Dodson wrote a Life of Sir Michael Foster. This, originally intended for the new edition of the Biographia Britannica, was published in 1811 with a preface by John Disney.

Dodson, a Unitarian, published A New Translation of Isaiah, with Notes Supplementary to those of Dr. Louth, late Bishop of London. By a Layman. This led to a controversy with Dr. Sturges, nephew of Robert Lowth, who replied in Short Remarks (1791), and was in turn answered by Dodson in a Letter to the Rev. Dr. Sturges, Author of “Short Remarks,” on a New Translation of Isaiah. Dodson wrote some other theological tracts.
