= Stone's Justices' Manual =

Stone's Justices' Manual is a book published by LexisNexis Butterworths. It is "the standard work on summary procedure". It displaced Burn's Justices of the Peace as the standard work on that subject from 1850 onwards. By 1914, it was old, well-established and formidably large.

Stone's Justices' Manual is published in June of every year, with an updating supplement published in October. An accompanying CD-ROM contains the full text plus additional resources such as the All England Law Reports.

Stone's Justices' Manual covers civil procedure, criminal law and litigation and provides comprehensive coverage of all new and amended legislation affecting the magistrates' courts. It also includes hundreds of new cases that set precedents or clarify particular principles of law.

== Editions ==
Edition	Date	Editor
1 to 17	1842 to 1874	Samuel Stone
18 to 33	1875 to 1901	G B Kennett
34 to 53	1902 to 1921	J R Roberts
54 to 70	1922 to 1938	F B Dingle
71 to 73	1939 to 1941	F B Dingle and E J Hayward
74 to 78	1942 to 1946	E J Hayward
79 to 83	1947 to 1951	J Whiteside
84 to 100	1952 to 1968	J Whiteside and J P Wilson
101 to 105	1969 to 1973	Peter Duncan Fanner and Cecil Thomas Latham
106 to 109	1974 to 1977	Cecil Thomas Latham and John Richman
110 to 125	1978 to 1993	John Richman and A T Draycott
126	1994	A T Draycott and Stuart Baker
127 to 133	1995 to 2001	A T Draycott and A P Carr
134 to 143	2002 to 2015	A P Carr and Adrian J Turner

== See also ==
List of main criminal law texts in England and Wales
