= Historia Placitorum Coronæ =

Influential treatise on the criminal law of England written by Matthew Hale

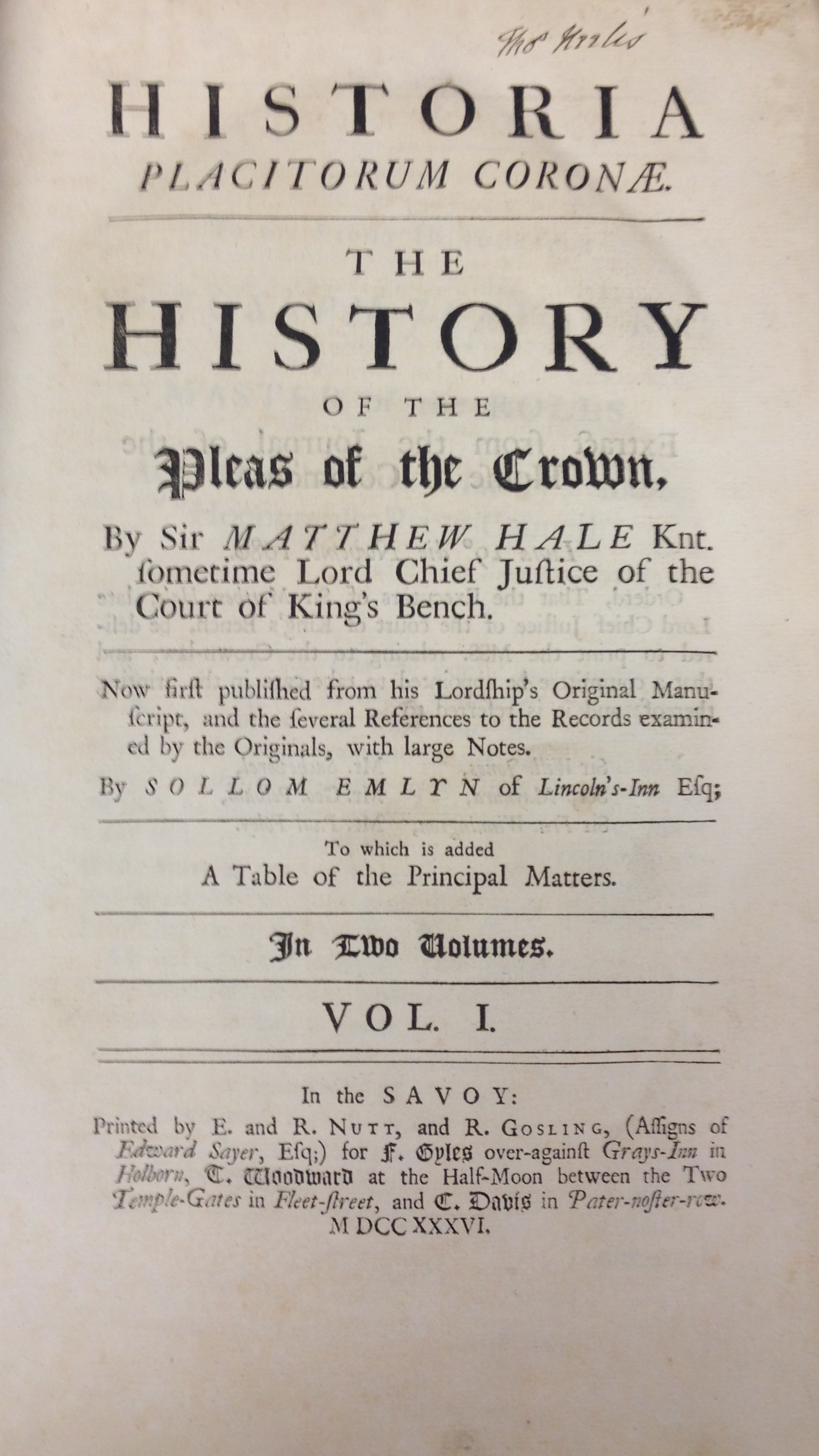
The title page of volume I of the first edition of Historia Placitorum Coronae (1736)

Historia Placitorum Coronæ or The History of the Pleas of the Crown is an influential treatise on the criminal law of England, written by Sir Matthew Hale and published posthumously with notes by Sollom Emlyn by E. and R. Nutt, and R. Gosling (the assigns of Edward Sayer), for F. Gyles, T. Woodward, and C. Davis in 1736.

== Publication ==
The book was published despite an instruction in Hale's will that none of his manuscripts was to be printed after his death, unless he had ordered the publication during his lifetime. This was defended by Emlyn on the basis that it was a work of enormous importance; that he appeared to have revoked this instruction in a codicil; and that, in any event, it was obvious that he had intended to publish it. He further observed that the order was the result of fear that the text would be altered or abridged.

== Contents ==
The book is divided into two parts. The first part deals with substantive law and the second part deals with procedure.

== Authority and reception ==
Dallas CJ, upon referring to this work, is reported to have said: "With respect to Lord Hale, it is needless to remind those whom I am now addressing, of the general character for learning and legal knowledge of that person, of whom it was said, that what was not known by him was not known by any other person, who preceded or followed him; and that, what he knew, he knew better than any other person who preceded or followed him."

Sir J. F. Stephen, whose incisive criticisms of his predecessors' treatises did not err on the side of mercy, said: "It is not only of the highest authority, but shows a depth of thought and comprehensiveness of design which puts it in quite a different category from Coke's Institutes. It is written on an excellent plan, and is far more of a treatise and far less of an index or mere work of practice than any book on the subject known to me". Stephen found, on the other hand, that it was marred by endless technicalities about principal and accessory, benefit of clergy, the precise interpretation of obscure phrases in statutes, and the law of procedure. But this criticism hardly takes into account the importance of these topics in Hale's time.

== See also ==
- Books of authority
- Bibliography of English criminal law

== Sources ==
- Percy Henry Winfield. The Chief Sources of English Legal History. 1925. Pages 254 and 326 to 328.
- Marvin. Legal Bibliography. 1847. Page 358.
- Bishop. New Commentaries on the Criminal Law. 1892. Volume 1. Page 46.
- 5 The American Law Review 629
- Owen Hood Phillips. "Hale and Hawkins". A First Book of English Law. Fourth Edition. 1960. Page 200.
- Dubber. Foundational Texts in Modern Criminal Law. Pages 62 to 64.
- Law Books in Action: Essays on the Anglo-American Legal Treatise. Pages 147 and 148.
- 5 The London Magazine 562

== Bibliography ==
- Hale, Matthew (1800), Historia Placitorum Coronæ: The History of the Pleas of the Crown, by Sir Matthew Hale. Pub. from the Original Manuscripts by Sollom Emlyn. With Additional Notes and References to Modern Cases Concerning the Pleas of the Crown. By George Wilson. A New Ed. And an Abridgment of the Statutes Relating to Felonies Continued to the Present Time, with Notes and References, by Thomas Dogherty, vol. 1, London: Printed by E. Rider, for T. Payne, H. L. Gardner, W. Otridge, E. and R. Brooke and J. Rider [and seven others in London], hdl:2027/uc2.ark:/13960/t19k4f990, OCLC 645127647.
- Hale, Matthew (1800), Historia Placitorum Coronæ: The History of the Pleas of the Crown, by Sir Matthew Hale. Pub. from the Original Manuscripts by Sollom Emlyn. With Additional Notes and References to Modern Cases Concerning the Pleas of the Crown. By George Wilson. A New Ed. And an Abridgment of the Statutes Relating to Felonies Continued to the Present Time, with Notes and References, by Thomas Dogherty, vol. 2, London: Printed by E. Rider, for T. Payne, H. L. Gardner, W. Otridge, E. and R. Brooke and J. Rider [and seven others in London], hdl:2027/uc2.ark:/13960/t19k4f990, OCLC 645127647.
- Hale, Matthew (1847), Historia Placitorum Coronae: The History of the Pleas of the Crown by Sir Matthew Hale, Knt. Some Time Lord Chief Justice of the Court of King's Bench. First Published from His Lordship's Original Manuscript, and the Several References to the Records Examined by the Originals, with Notes by Sollom Emlyn, of Lincoln's Inn, Esq. With a Table of the Principal Matters. First American Edition. With Notes and References to Later Cases by W. A. Stokes and E. Ingersoll of the Philadelphia Bar. In Two Volumes, vol. 1 (1st American ed.), Philadelphia, Penn.: Robert H. Small, OCLC 837241071.
- Hale, Matthew (1847), Historia Placitorum Coronae: The History of the Pleas of the Crown by Sir Matthew Hale, Knt. Some Time Lord Chief Justice of the Court of King's Bench. First Published from His Lordship's Original Manuscript, and the Several References to the Records Examined by the Originals, with Notes by Sollom Emlyn, of Lincoln's Inn, Esq. With a Table of the Principal Matters. First American Edition. With Notes and References to Later Cases by W. A. Stokes and E. Ingersoll of the Philadelphia Bar. In Two Volumes, vol. 2 (1st American ed.), Philadelphia, Penn.: Robert H. Small, OCLC 837241071.
