= William Hawkins (priest) =

English clergyman, poet and dramatist

- Born: 1722
- Died: 1801

William Hawkins (1722–1801) was an English clergyman, known as a poet and dramatist.

== Life ==
He was eldest son of William Hawkins, serjeant-at-law, by his first wife, a daughter of Sir Roger Jenyns and sister of Soame Jenyns. He was educated at John Roysse's Free School in Abingdon, (now Abingdon School). Through his grandmother he was descended from the brother of Thomas Tesdale, one of the founders of Pembroke College, Oxford, and he matriculated there on 12 November 1737. He graduated B.A. on 26 February 1742, and on 2 March following was admitted a fellow on the Tesdale foundation. James Boswell mentions Hawkins as one of the distinguished alumni of Pembroke College, when commenting on Samuel Johnson's description of the college as 'a nest of singing-birds.' The serjeant lived in the city of Oxford, and for some years his son lived at the university, composing of sermons, poems, and tragedies. On 10 April 1744 he proceeded M.A., and, when Robert Lowth vacated the professorship of poetry in 1751, Hawkins succeeded to the chair (6 June 1751 to 1756).

He had been ordained in the Church of England, and was instituted on 27 August 1764 to the small rectory of Little Casterton, Rutland. He moved at the close of 1764 to the rectory of Whitchurch Canonicorum, Dorset, which he retained until his death. He held the prebendal stall of Combe (seventh) in Wells Cathedral from his collation on 7 March 1767 to his death.

Throughout his life Hawkins was indefatigable in writing and preaching, and he was one of the earliest Bampton lecturers. He died in a fit at Oxford on 13 October 1801.

== Works ==
Early in life Hawkins contributed pieces to magazines, and in 1743, when he was only twenty-one, he published his first work, The Thimble, an heroi-comical Poem in four cantos, by a Gentleman of Oxford, which was reissued in the following year. This imitation of Alexander Pope's Rape of the Lock was dedicated toAnna Maria Woodford, 'the compleatest housewife in Europe.' His next venture was in play-writing, and it remained his passion for nearly twenty-five years. Henry and Rosamond, a Tragedy, was published in 1749, and was at once pirated by the Dublin printers. It was offered to the managers of Drury Lane Theatre and declined; it is an attempt in the manner of Shakespeare, whose play of Cymbeline, with alterations by Hawkins, was acted at Covent Garden Theatre but condemned as being 'entirely ruined by his unpoetical additions and injudicious alterations.' The mangled play was printed in 1759. Of a third play, the Siege of Aleppo, which was never acted, Hawkins alleged that it had met the approval of 'Judge Blackstone, Mr. Smart of Cambridge, Mr. Samuel Johnson, and Mr. Thomas Warton.' David Garrick, to whom it was submitted, rejected the piece as 'wrong in the first concoction,’ and an account of his quarrel with its author appears in Boswell's Johnson. Hawkins had further correspondence with Garrick respecting three more plays, 'The Queen of Lombardy, or the Ambitious Lover,’ 'Troilus and Cressida,’ and 'Alfred.' Hawkins accounted for the rejection of his pieces by alleging that he had given Garrick some offence in connection with the previous play of 'Henry and Rosamond.'

A volume issued in 1754 under the pseudonym of Gyles Smith, containing 'Serious Reflections on the Dangerous Tendency of the Common Practice of Card-playing,’ is attributed to Hawkins. In 1758 he collected and published in three volumes his separate publications. The first volume consisted of tracts on divinity; the second of dramatic and other poems, including the 'Thimble,’ 'Henry and Rosamond,’ and the 'Siege of Aleppo;’ and the last of his lectures on poetry and his Creweian orations, delivered as professor of poetry at Oxford. Oliver Goldsmith wrote a review of these productions for the Critical Review. On most of them he was severe, but he singled out the play of 'Aleppo' as deserving applause. Hawkins replied in a maladroit defence, signed 'Veridicus,’ and styled 'A Review of the Works of the Rev. W. Hawkins and of the Remarks made on the same in the "Critical Review" for August and in the "Monthly Review" for September 1759.' Goldsmith rejoined in the 'Critical Review'.

The translation by Hawkins of the first six books of the Æneid appeared in 1764; though the translation of the rest was ready for the press, the reception did not warrant the printing of the remainder. Hawkins's failures did not restrain him from issuing in 1781 a collection of 'Poems on Various Subjects.'

Hawkins was a constant writer of sermons, and he printed:

- 'A Sermon before the University of Oxford on 30 Jan.,’ 1752.
- 'The Nature, Extent, and Excellence of Christian Charity' (a Colston sermon), 1755.
- 'The Reasonableness of our Belief in Christianity' (two sermons at St. Mary's, Oxford), 1756.
- 'Pretences of Enthusiasts considered and confuted' (two sermons preached at St. Mary's, one on 26 June 1768 and the other on 6 August 1769). The first was answered by 'The Oxford Confutation confuted, by Philologos,’ Cambridge [1769].
- 'Discourses on Scripture Mysteries' (Bampton lectures, 1787, which led him into a controversy with Samuel Palmer.
- 'Regal Rights consistent with National Liberties,’ 1795.

== See also ==
- List of Old Abingdonians
