= William Hawkins (serjeant-at-law) =

English barrister and legal writer (1682–1750)

William Hawkins (1682–1750) was a barrister and serjeant-at-law, best known for his work on the English criminal law, Treatise of Pleas of the Crown.

He graduated with a Bachelor of Arts from Oriel College, Oxford in 1699 and was elected as a fellow of the same college in 1700. He is often confused with a contemporary William Hawkins of St John's College Cambridge, who became a prebendary at St Paul's. He was admitted a member of the Inner Temple on 10 February 1701. He became a serjeant-at-law on 1 February 1724. Among his clients was Thomas Bambridge, the notoriously cruel warden of Fleet Prison.

In addition to his Treatise of Pleas of the Crown, he also published an abridgment of the first part of Edward Coke's Institutes of the Lawes of England in 1711. This work ran through many editions, and was praised by Blackstone in the Commentaries on the Laws of England.

The poet William Hawkins was his son.

He died in Hornchurch, Essex on 19 February 1750, leaving lands in London and Islip, Oxfordshire.
