= Criminal Appeal Reports =

English series of law reports

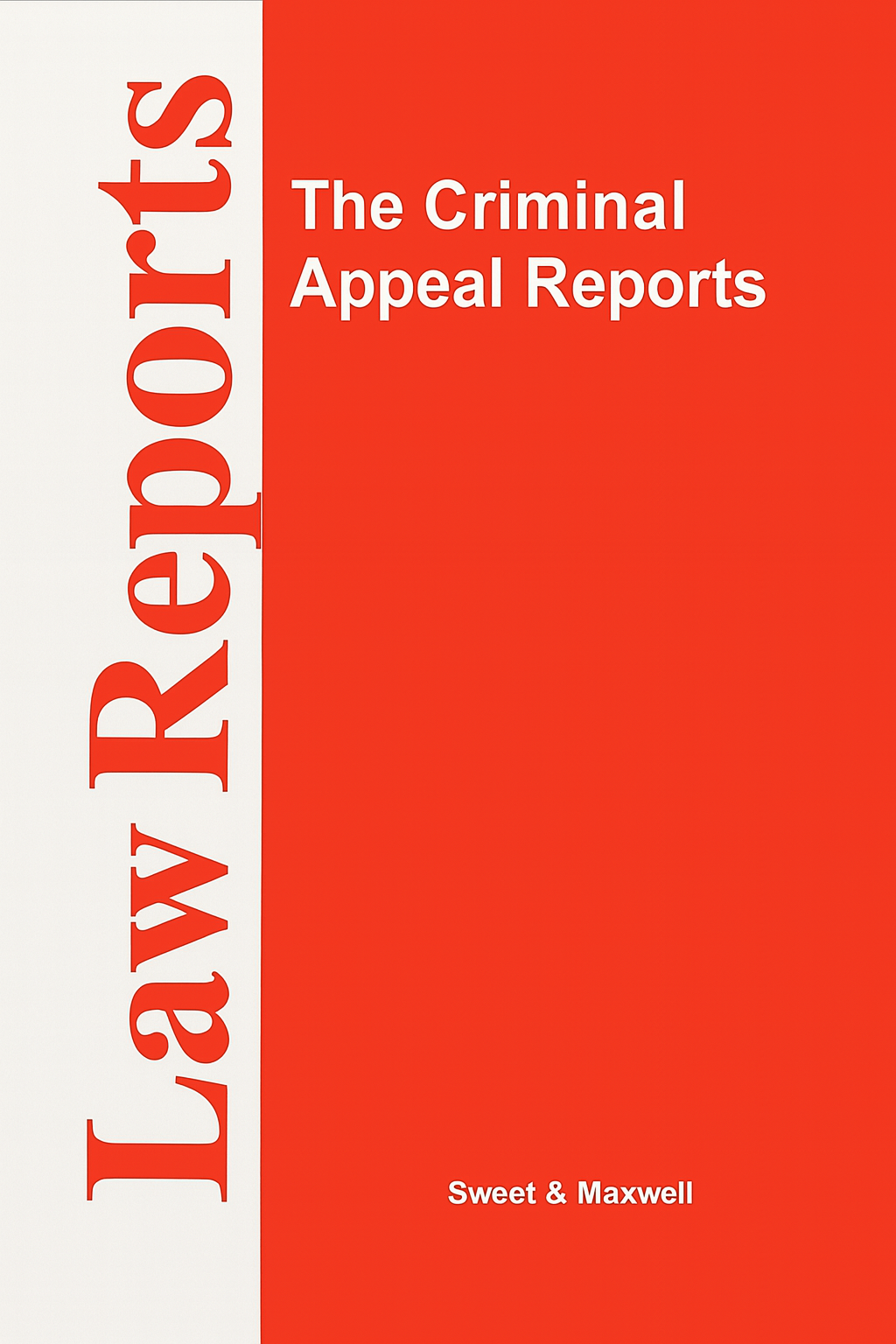
- Discipline: Criminal law of England and Wales
- Language: English
- Edited by: Clare Barsby

Publication details
- History: 1909–present
- Publisher: Sweet & Maxwell (England and Wales)
- Frequency: 10 issues per annum

Standard abbreviations
- ISO 4: Crim. Appeal Rep.

Indexing
- ISSN: 0070-1521
- OCLC no.: 2617568

Links
- Report homepage; Westlaw

The Criminal Appeal Reports are a series of law reports of decisions of the Court of Criminal Appeal, the criminal division of the Court of Appeal and the House of Lords from 15 May 1908 onwards.

They are published by Sweet & Maxwell. Publication began in 1909 and have been edited by Daniel Janner since 1994. As of 2008, they were published ten times per year.

For the purpose of citation, their name may be abbreviated to "Cr App R", or to "CAR".

Glanville Williams criticised the layout of the index in each volume of these reports.

Volume 1 contains, in addition to the reports, a copy of the Criminal Appeal Act 1907, sections 9(5) and (6) of the Costs in Criminal Cases Act 1908, the Criminal Appeal (Amendment) Act 1908, section 11 of the Prevention of Crime Act 1908 and section 99(6) of the Children Act 1908 (8 Edw. 7. c. 67).

== See also ==
- Criminal Appeal Reports (Sentencing)
- Bibliography of English criminal law
