= Criminal Appeal Reports (Sentencing) =

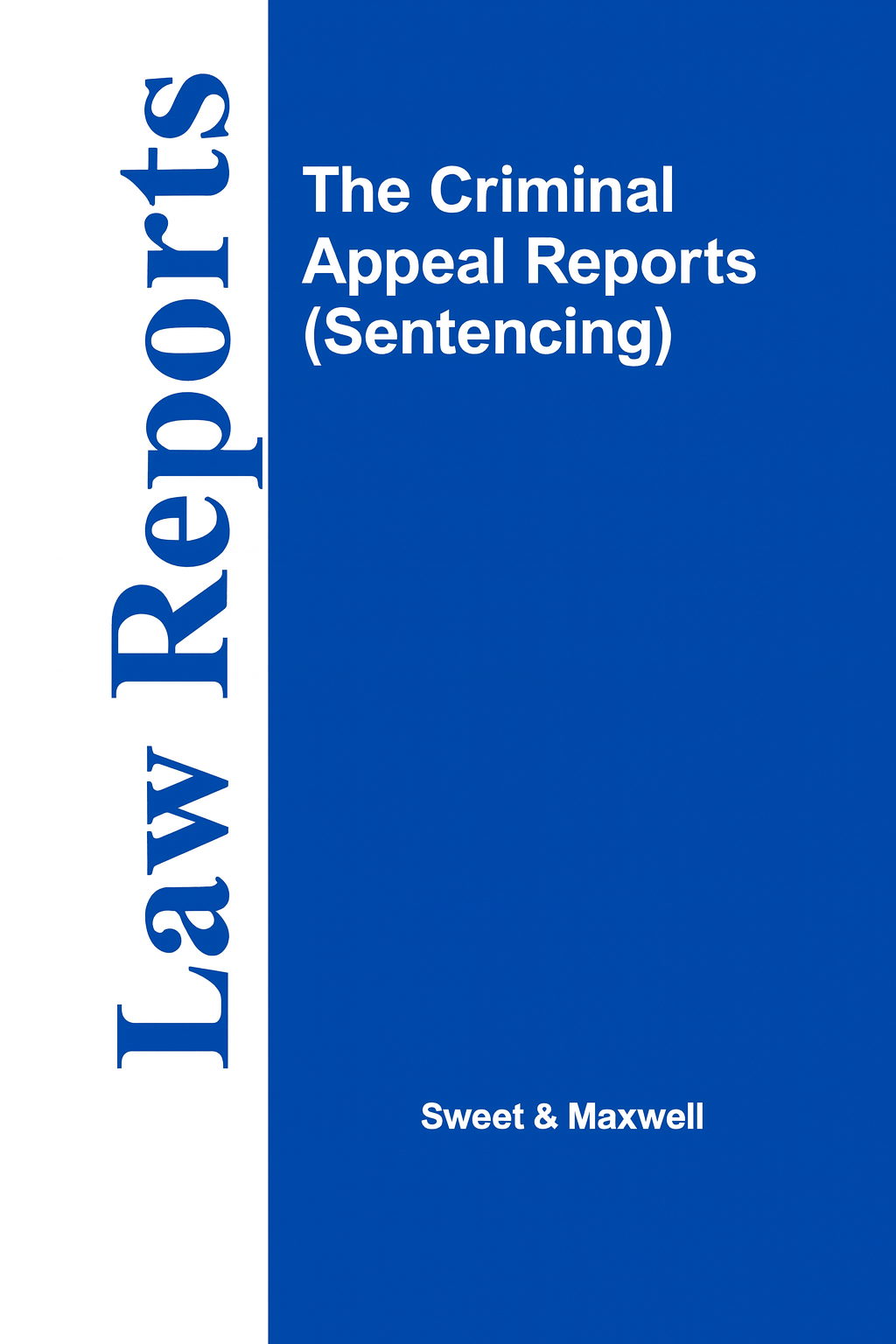
- Discipline: Sentencing law of England and Wales
- Language: English
- Edited by: Lyndon Harris, Sebastian Walker

Publication details
- History: 1980-present
- Publisher: Sweet & Maxwell (England and Wales)
- Frequency: 10 issues per annum

Standard abbreviations
- ISO 4: Crim. Appeal Rep. (Sentencing)

Indexing
- ISSN: 0144-3321

Links
- Report homepage; Westlaw

The Criminal Appeal Reports (Sentencing), sometimes referred to as the Criminal Appeal (Sentencing) Reports, are a series of law reports of decisions which relate to sentencing.

They are published by Sweet & Maxwell. The series was inaugurated by Dr David A. Thomas QC in 1979 and he was editor until his untimely death in 2013. The current editors are Lyndon Harris and Sebastian Walker. It is published six times each year.

For the purpose of citation, the reports may be abbreviated to "Cr.App.R.(S.) ".

== See also ==
- Criminal Appeal Reports
- Bibliography of English criminal law
