= Jeremy Horder =

Jeremy Christian Nicholas Horder FBA (born 25 February 1962) is Professor of Criminal Law and former Head of Department at the London School of Economics and Political Science. From 2005 - 2010 he served as Law Commissioner for England and Wales. Horder graduated from the University of Hull in 1984 with an LLB. He then studied Civil Law at the University of Oxford, completing his DPhil while a Fellow of Jesus College. His thesis concerned homicide law from the 16th to the 20th Centuries. Horder was the Chairman of Oxford's Faculty of Law between 1998 and 2000. He is an Honorary Bencher of Middle Temple and former Edmund Davies Professor of Criminal Law at King's College London. He holds an Honorary LLD from the University of Hull. In 2014 he was elected a Fellow of the British Academy, the United Kingdom's national academy for the humanities and social sciences.
