= Year Books =

Earliest law reports of England

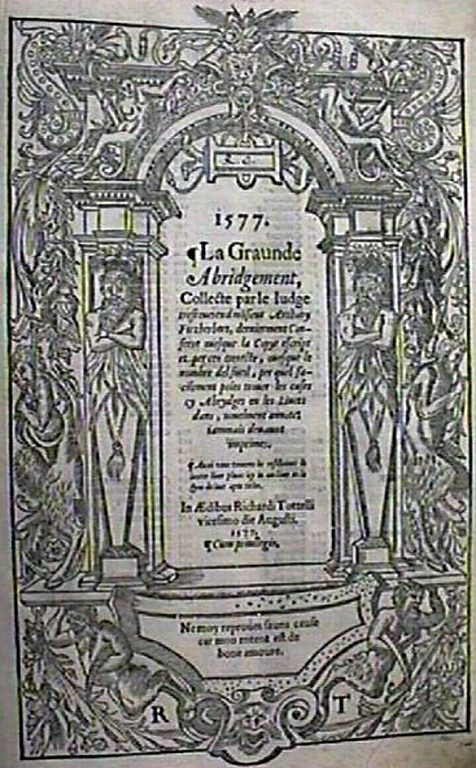
La Graunde Abridgement was a collection of cases compiled out of the Year Books by Sir Anthony Fitzherbert; this printed edition appeared in 1577.

The Year Books are the earliest law reports of England. This name for the later collections of these reports is of modern origin.

Substantial numbers of manuscripts circulated during the Late Middle Ages, containing reports of pleas heard before the Common Bench. In the sixteenth century versions of this material appeared in print form. These publications constituted the earliest legal precedents of the common law. They are extant in a continuous series from 1268 to 1535, covering the reigns of King Edward I to Henry VIII. The language of the original manuscripts and editions was either Latin or Law French. Maitland and others have considered that the medieval manuscripts were compiled by law students, rather than being officially sanctioned accounts of court proceedings.

The best-known printed version is the so-called "Vulgate" edition, which appeared in a series of volumes between 1678 and 1680, and which became the standard edition consulted by practising lawyers. More recent editions for the use of lawyers and historians have been made by the Selden Society. Traditionally, they have been divided into eleven separate series:

1. Maynard's Reports, temp. Edw. II.; also divers Memoranda of the Exchequer, temp. Edward I.
2. Reports in the first ten years of Edw. III.
3. Reports from 17 to 39 Edward III.
4. Reports from 40 to 50 Edward III.
5. Liber Assisarum; or Pleas of the Crown, temp. Edw. III.
6. Reports temp. Hen. IV. and Hen. V.
7. Annals, or Reports of Hen. VI. during his reign, v. 1
8. Annals, or Reports of Hen. VI. during his reign, v. 2
9. Annals of Edward IV.
10. Long Quinto; or Reports in 5 Edward IV.
11. Cases in the reigns of Edward V, Richard III, Henry VII, and Henry VIII.

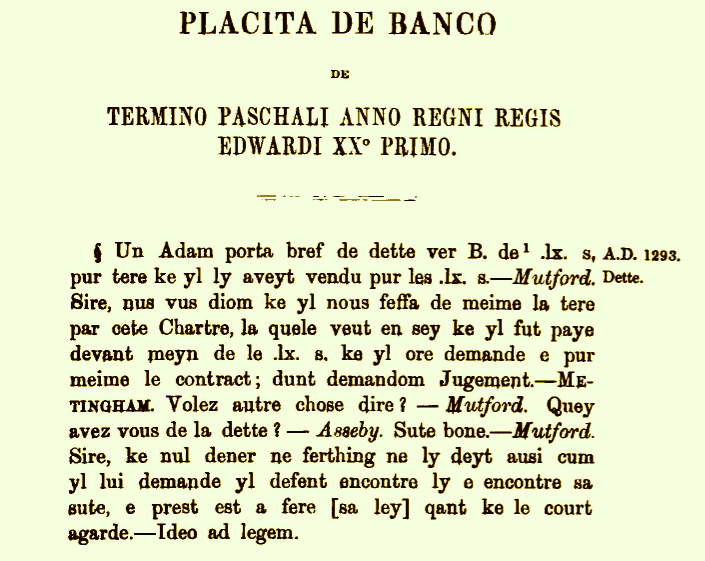
A law report of 1293 (Victorian printed transcript of original manuscript)

A number of abridgements of the Year Books were compiled and circulated by various editors, who sought to excerpt leading cases and categorise them by subject. The first abridgment was made by Nicholas Statham, Baron of the Exchequer under Edward IV, in around 1470.

The last year for which a yearbook was printed was 1535. Thereafter printed law reports became more various. The earliest such reports are called the nominate reports; their original publications were named after the court reporter who compiled and edited them. Sir Edward Coke was one important early jurist who published a series of court reports during his tenure as chief justice of the Court of Common Pleas.

== See also ==
- Henry de Bracton
