= Nicholas Statham =

English lawyer and legal writer

- Born: Morley, Derbyshire
- Occupation: lawyer

Nicholas Statham (fl. 1467) was an English lawyer, known as a legal writer.

== Life ==
He is stated to have been born at Morley, Derbyshire. He was reader of Lincoln's Inn in Lent term 1471. On 30 October 1467 he received a patent for the reversion as second baron of the exchequer on the death of John Clerke. Clerke was certainly alive in 1471, but there is no mention of either him or Statham between that date and 3 February 1481, when Thomas Whittington was made second baron. Consequently it is not known whether Statham ever obtained the office.

== Work ==
Statham's name is never mentioned in the year-books, but he is credited with an abridgment of the cases reported in them in the reign of Henry VI, which is the earliest work of the kind now extant. Statham's abridgment was printed by R. Pynson as Epitome Annalium Librorum tempore Henrici Sexti, London [1495 ?]; other editions appeared in 1585 and 1679.
