= Michael Foster (English judge) =

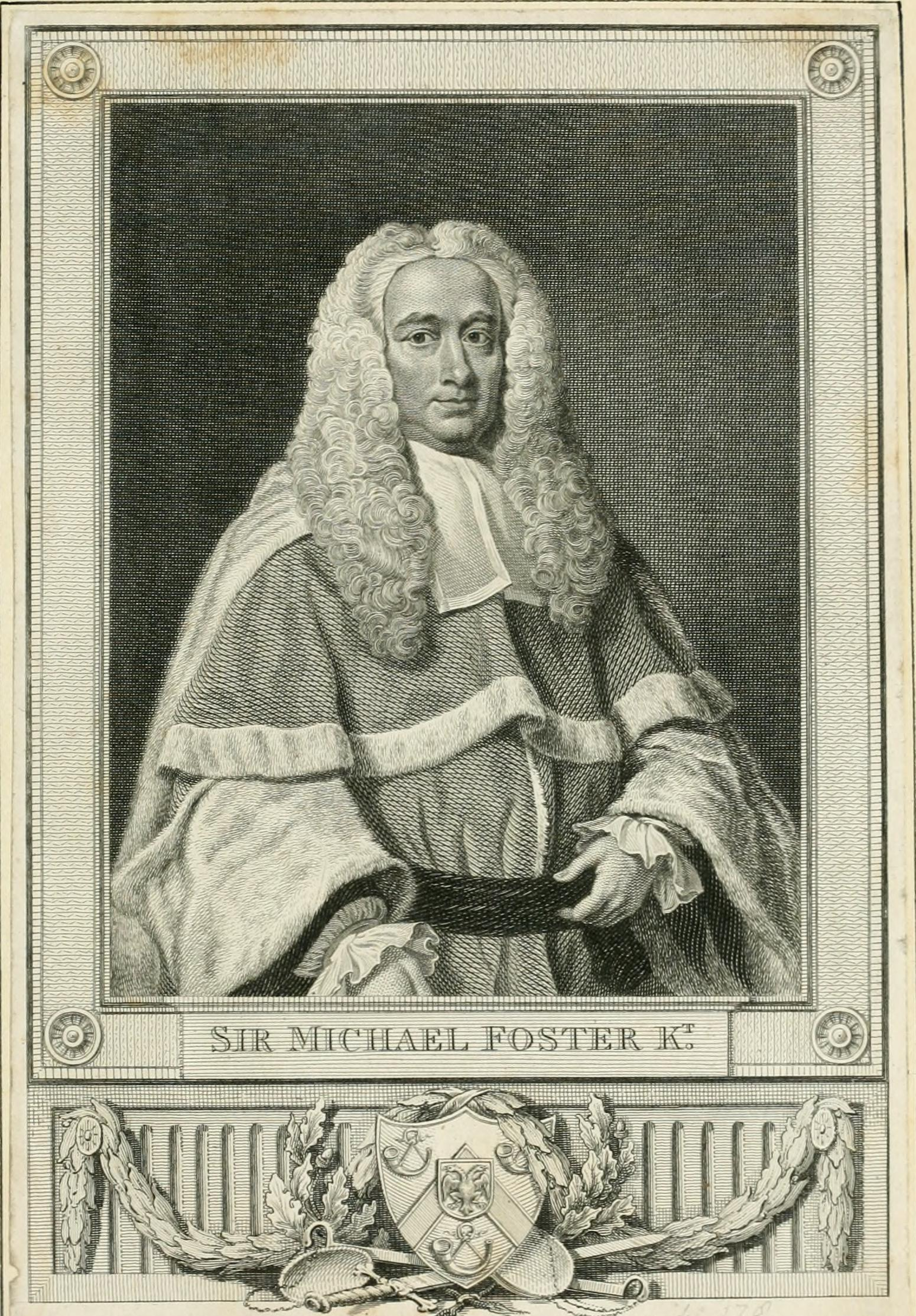
Engraving by J. Neagle based on a picture by James Wills

Sir Michael Foster (1689–1763) was an English barrister and judge.

Foster was born in Marlborough, Wiltshire 16 December 1689, and attended the free school in Marlborough before enrolling briefly at Exeter College, Oxford before studying law at the Middle Temple. Foster began his legal career in Bristol, where he became a prominent barrister before he was appointed the recorder of Bristol in August 1735 and serjeant-at-law in 1736. Foster served as recorder until his resignation in 1764. In 1745, he was knighted and appointed a puisne judge of the King's Bench. He sat on the King's Bench for 18 years, where he acquired a reputation for learnedness, integrity, and independence of judgment. Foster died in November 1763, aged 73.

== Early life and education ==
Michael Foster was born at Marlborough, Wiltshire, on 16 December 1689. His father, Michael Foster, and his grandfather, John Foster, were also lawyers.

After attending the free school in Marlborough, Foster matriculated at Exeter College, Oxford on 7 May 1705, but it doesn't appear that he took a degree. Foster was subsequently admitted as a student at the Middle Temple on 23 May 1707, and was called to the bar in May 1713.

== Legal and judicial career ==
=== Early career ===
Having had little success in London, Foster returned to Marlborough and then moved to Bristol, where, he gained quite a reputation as a barrister.

=== Recorder ===
In August 1735, he was chosen to be the recorder of Bristol and, in spring 1736, became a serjeant-at-law. He held the post of recorder until his resignation in 1764. During Foster's tenure in office, several important cases came before him including the case of Goodere and Broadfoot.

In 1741, Captain Samuel Goodere was tried for the murder of his brother, Sir John Dineley Goodere, 2nd Baronet, and the case established that city had the right to try capital offences committed within its jurisdiction.

In the Broadfoot case, Alexander Broadfoot, a crewman on a cargo ship, was indicted for the murder of Cornelius Calahan, a sailor in the navy, who boarded Broadfoot's vessel in an attempt to press Broadfoot into naval service, Foster delivered a long judgment in support of the legality of impressment (conscription), as being in the public interest and a prerogative inherent of the crown, grounded in common law, and recognised by numerous statutes. However, he directed the jury to find Broadfoot guilty only of manslaughter, as Calahan had acted without legal warrant.

=== Later career and encomiums ===
On the recommendation of Lord Chancellor Hardwicke, Foster was appointed a puisne judge of the King's Bench to succeed Sir William Chapple. Foster was knighted on 21 April 1745 and took his seat on the bench on 1 May 1745.

During the 18 years, he sat in the King's Bench, he acquired a character for learnedness, integrity, and independence of judgment.

== Death and family ==
In 1725, he married Martha Lyde, the eldest daughter of James Lyde of Stantonwick, Somersetshire. She died on 15 May 1758. The couple had no children.

Foster died on 7 November 1763, aged 73, and was buried in the parish church at Stanton Drew in Somersetshire, where a monument was erected to his memory. He was survived by his three sisters.

== Works ==
Foster was the author of the following works:

- A Letter of Advice to Protestant Dissenters, 1720.
- An Examination of the Scheme of Church Power laid down in the Codex Juris Ecclesiastici Anglicani, &c., anon., London, 1735, 8vo; the second edition, corrected, London, 1735, 8vo; the third edition, corrected, London, 1736, 8vo; the fifth edition, corrected, Dublin, 1763, 8vo. A reprint of the third edition was published in No. vii. of Tracts for the People, designed to vindicate Religious and Christian Liberty, London, 1840, 8vo.
- The Case of the King against Alexander Broadfoot … 30 August 1743, Oxford, 1758, 4to.
- A Report of some Proceedings on the Commission of Oyer and Terminer and Gaol Delivery for the Trial of the Rebels in the year 1746 in the County of Surry, and of other Crown Cases. To which are added Discourses upon a few Branches of the Crown Law, London and Oxford, 1762, revised in 1776 and 1792 by his nephew, Michael Dodson, barrister of the Middle Temple, London.
