= Institutes of the Lawes of England =

Legal treatises by Sir Edward Coke

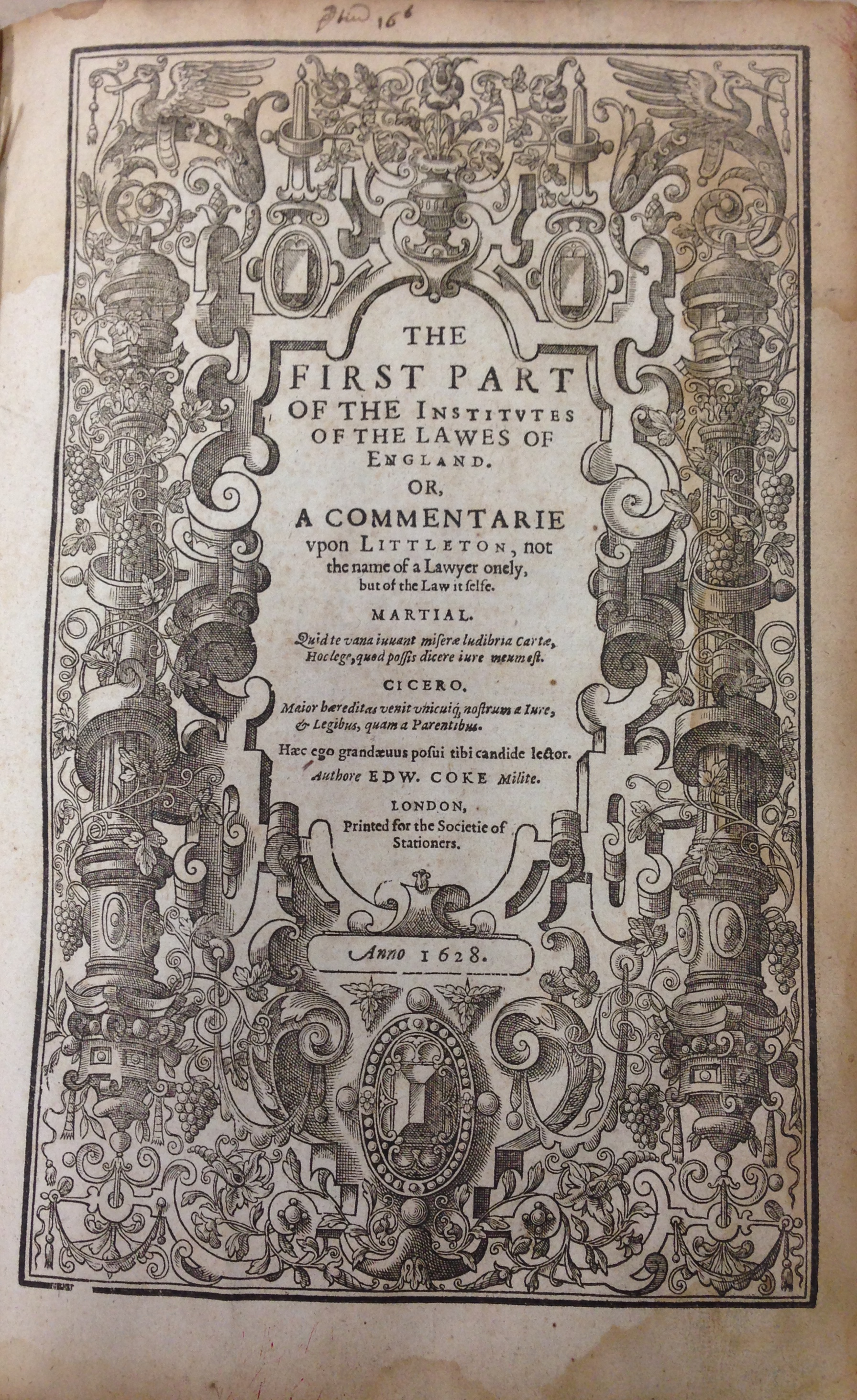
- Title page of the first volume of the first edition
- Author: Edward Coke
- Language: English
- Subject: English law
- Genre: Non-fiction
- Published: 1628–1644
- Publication place: England
- Pages: Part I: 395; Part II: 745; Part III: 243; Part IV: 364
- LC Class: Part I: KD833.C65; Part II: KD660.C642; Part III: KD7869.C65; Part IV: KD7443.C65

The Institutes of the Lawes of England are a series of legal treatises written by Sir Edward Coke. They were first published, in stages and in some cases posthumously, (Note: Coke died in 1634.) between 1628 and 1644. Widely recognized as a foundational document of the common law, they have been cited in over 70 cases decided by the Supreme Court of the United States, including several landmark cases. For example, in Roe v. Wade (1973), Coke's Institutes are cited as evidence that under old English common law, an abortion performed before quickening was not an indictable offence. In the much earlier case of United States v. E. C. Knight Co. (1895), Coke's Institutes are quoted at some length for their definition of monopolies. (Note: See also Straus v. Victor Talking Machine Co. (1917), in which the Supreme Court referred to the respondent's restrictive practices (in violation of the principle of Coke's Institutes, section 360, as ones that "have been hateful to the law from Lord Coke's day to ours".) Sir Edward Coke’s Institutes also had a significant influence on the development of legal principles in the American colonies. For instance, the Institutes were highly regarded by early American legal scholars and practitioners, including Thomas Jefferson, who referenced Coke’s work in his writings on legal theory and the foundation of American law. This influence helped shape the legal system of the United States in its formative years. The Institutes' various reprinted editions well into the 19th century are a clear indication of the long lasting value placed on this work throughout especially the 18th century in Britain and Europe. It has also been associated through the years with high literary connections. For example, David Hume requested it in 1764 from the bookseller Andrew Millar in a cheap format for a French friend.

In 1814, Jefferson wrote that “Cokes Institutes are a perfect digest of the Law”.

== Contents ==
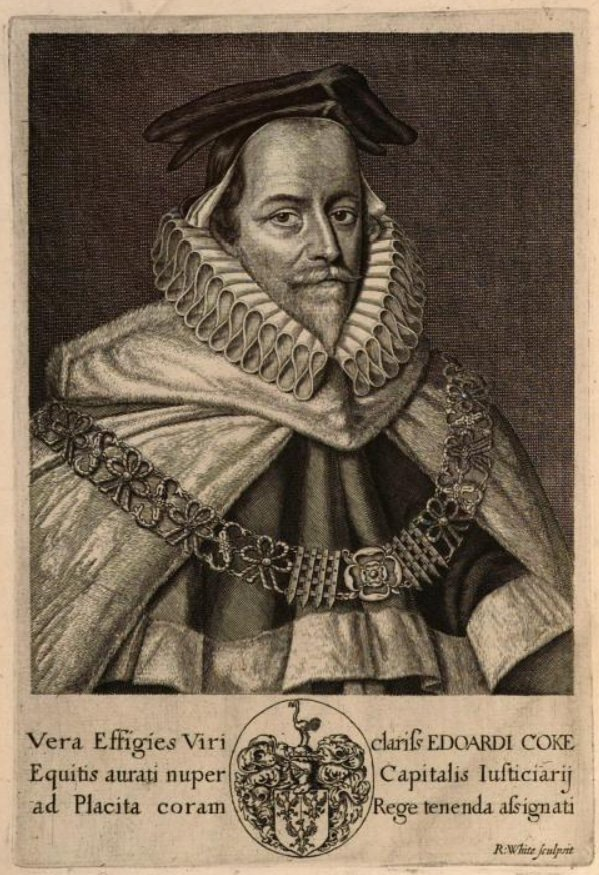
A portrait of Edward Coke from the frontispiece of The Third Part of the Institutes of the Laws of England (4th ed., 1669)

=== First Part ===
The First Part's subtitle is a "Commentary upon Littleton", concerning land law and property law. Often called Coke on Littleton (abbreviated "Co. Litt."), it is a commentary on Thomas de Littleton's treatise on land tenure.

=== Second Part ===
The Second Part's subtitle is "Containing the Exposition of Many Ancient and Other Statutes", particularly the Magna Carta.

=== Third Part ===
The Third Part's subtitle is "Concerning High Treason and other Please of the Crown and Criminal Causes". There is a reference to the ownership of the human corpse in this part, where Coke states that "the "buriall of the Cadaver is nullius in bonis [in the goods of no one] and belongs to Ecclesiastical cognizance".

=== Fourth Part ===
The Fourth Part's subtitle is "Concerning the Jurisdiction of the Courts".

== See also ==
- English land law
- UK constitutional law
- English contract law
- Books of authority
- Rule of law
