= Henry de Bracton =

English jurist (c.1210 – c.1268)

Henry of Bracton
- Born: c. 1210; Devon, Kingdom of England
- Died: c. 1268
- Resting place: Exeter Cathedral
- Other names: Henry de Bracton; Henricus Bracton; Henry Bratton; Henry Bretton
- Occupations: Cleric; jurist; royal justice
- Era: 13th century
- Known for: De legibus et consuetudinibus Angliæ; early formulation of mens rea
- Notable work: De legibus et consuetudinibus Angliæ
- Title: Archdeacon of Barnstaple; Chancellor of Exeter Cathedral; Rector of Combe-in-Teignhead; Rector of Bideford

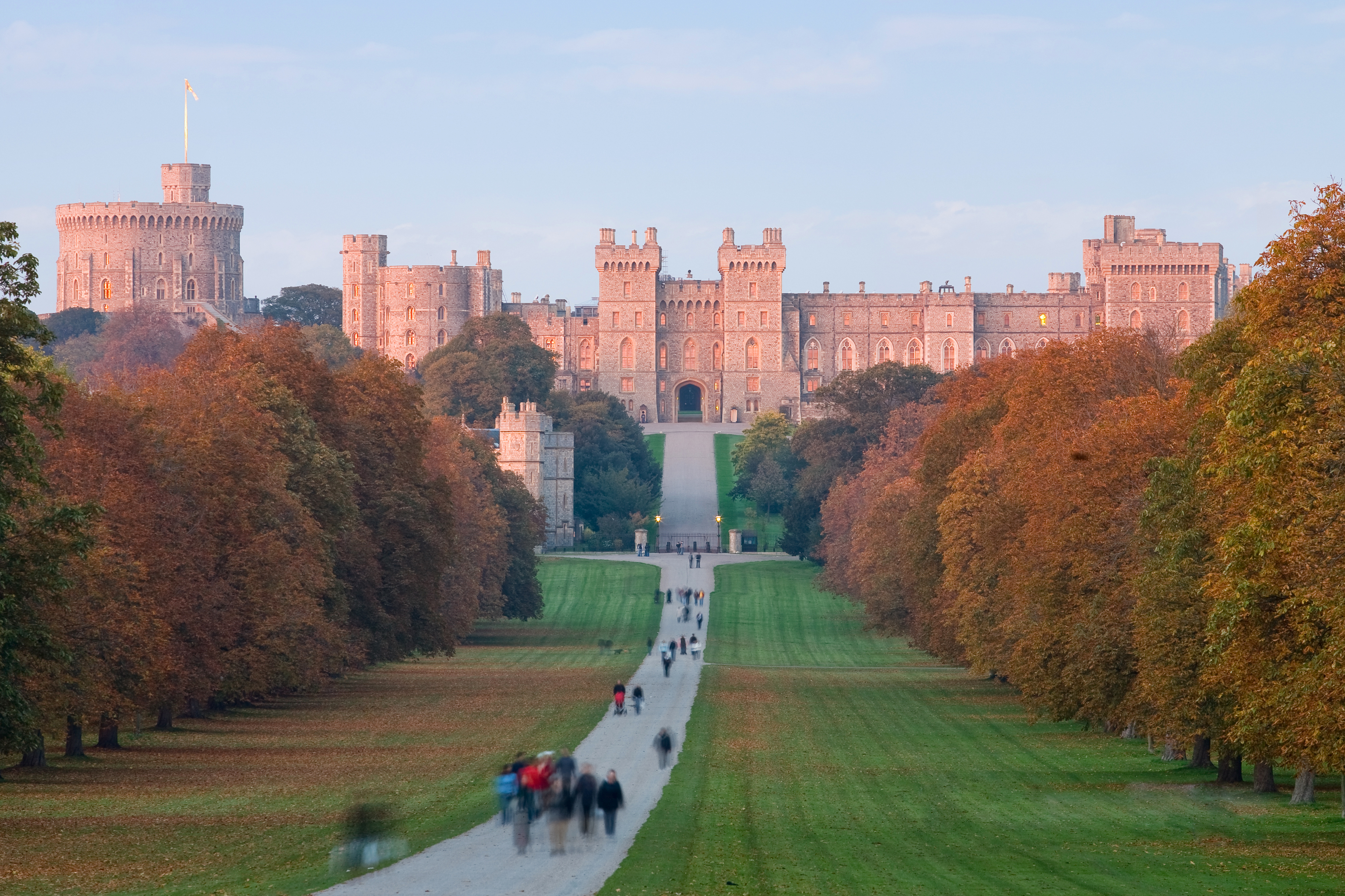
Henry de Bracton was appointed to the coram rege, the advisory council of Henry III of England. The photo shows Windsor Castle in Berkshire.

Henry of Bracton (c. 1210 – c. 1268), also known as Henry de Bracton, Henricus Bracton, Henry Bratton, and Henry Bretton, was an English cleric and jurist.

He is famous now for his writings on law, particularly De legibus et consuetudinibus Angliæ ("On the Laws and Customs of England"), and his ideas on mens rea (criminal intent). According to Bracton, it was only through the examination of a combination of action and intention that the commission of a criminal act could be established. He also wrote on kingship, arguing that a ruler should be called king only if he obtained and exercised power in a lawful manner.

In his writings, Bracton manages to set out coherently the law of the royal courts through his use of categories drawn from Roman law, thus incorporating into English law several developments of medieval Roman law.

== Life ==
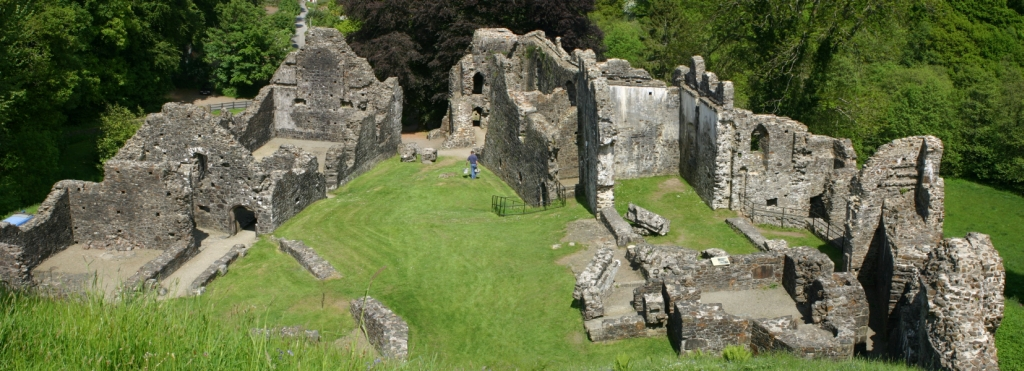
Bracton came from Devon and held circuit courts there. The picture is of Okehampton Castle in Devon

Plucknett describes Bracton in this way: "Two generations after Ranulf de Glanvill we come to the flower and crown of English jurisprudence – Bracton." Bracton was born around 1210 in Devon and had a great deal of preferment in the Church. He derived from either Bratton Fleming or Bratton Clovelly. Both villages are in Devon. It was only after his death that the family name appears as Bracton; during his life, he was known as Bratton, or Bretton. This originally may have been Bradton, meaning "Broad Town". Bracton first appeared as a justice in 1245. From 1248 until his death in 1268 he was steadily employed as a justice of the assize in the southwestern counties, especially Somerset, Devon and Cornwall. He was a member of the coram rege, also called the coram ipso rege, later to become the King's Court. He retired from this in 1257, shortly before the meeting of the Mad Parliament in 1258 at Oxford. It is unknown whether his retirement was related to politics. His leaving coincided with the onset of the notorious Second Barons' War in 1264. At that time Bracton was ordered to restore to the Treasury the large store of plea rolls (case records from previous trials) that had been in his possession. He was also forced to surrender the large number of rolls from his predecessors Martin Pateshull and William Raleigh, also known as William de Raley. It cannot be determined whether he disgraced the King or the barons in this affair, but it is speculated that some kind of political intrigue was involved. The practical result was that his major work, De legibus et consuetudinibus Angliæ ("The Laws and Customs of England"), was left unfinished. Even so, it exists in four large volumes today. He continued to follow the assizes in the southwest until 1267. In the last year of his life he filled another prominent role, as member of a commission of prelates, magnates and justices appointed to hear the complaints of the "disinherited" – those who had sided with Simon de Montfort, 6th Earl of Leicester.

Bracton apparently had access to the highest stations of Church and State. He was an ecclesiastic. In 1259 he became the rector of the Devonshire parish of Combe-in-Teignhead and in 1261, the rector of Bideford. In 1264 he was made the archdeacon of Barnstaple and in the same year, chancellor of Exeter Cathedral. In 1245 he enjoyed a dispensation enabling him to hold three ecclesiastical benefices. He was buried in the nave of Exeter Cathedral, in front of an altar bearing his name. He had established a chantry (a continuous set of prayers in perpetuity) for his soul that was endowed from the revenues of the Manor of Thorverton.

Bracton chose the words of Ulpian (Pandects 1.1.1) to describe the legal profession: "Ius dicitur ars boni et aequi, cuius merito quis nos sacerdotes appellat: iusticiam namque colimus et sacra iura ministramus." (Law is called the good and just art, whose priests we are deservedly called: for we worship Justice and minister the sacred laws.) Ulpian was an influential Roman jurist in the second century, whose writings were revered in medieval Europe. Bracton felt himself to be, metaphorically, a priest of the law, "a priest forever in the order of Ulpian," a playful allusion to the Melchizedek priesthood.

== Influences: Pateshull and Raleigh ==
Two legal predecessors directly influenced Bracton. The first was Martin de Pateshull, one of John of England's clerks, who became justice of the bench in 1217, and in 1224 was one of the itinerant justices whom Falkes de Bréauté attacked. Bracton esteemed Pateshull highly and remarked, "In any list of regular justices, Pateshull's name so constantly precedes all others that he must have enjoyed some pre-eminence, though perhaps not of a definitive kind." Pateshull was archdeacon of Norwich Cathedral and dean of St. Paul's Cathedral. His capacity for hard work was such that a brother justice asked Hubert de Burgh to excuse him from going on circuit with Pateshull on the ground that he wore out his colleagues by his incessant activity. Of his abilities as a lawyer, Bracton's appreciative citations speak eloquently. He appears to have gained his reputation as a lawyer, pure and simple. He died in 1229.

The second great influence on Bracton's thinking was William Raleigh, also known as William de Raley, a native of Devon. He was a resident in and around Bratton Fleming in Devon in 1212, when Bracton was born there. Raleigh was a justice of the bench in 1228. In 1234 he pronounced reversal judgment of Hubert de Burgh, 1st Earl of Kent's outlawry. Though he was not a justiciar, he was regarded as the chief among judges. In 1237 he was appointed treasurer of Exeter Cathedral. He was elected to the See of Winchester in 1238 and passed from legal history. His election to this position was violently opposed by the King who favoured William of Valence. In 1239, Raleigh was elected to the See of Norwich. In 1244, he was elected to the See of Winchester for a second time. He died in 1250. He had much to do with the passage of the Statute of Merton. Raleigh defended the refusal of the barons to change the law of bastardy and legitimation. He invented the writ Quare ejecit infra terminum and was influential in the writing of several other novel writs. It is from Bracton that we get the majority of the history of the law at the time. Bracton is thought to have had a notebook with 2000 cases from Pateshull and Raleigh.

Raleigh granted lands to Bracton in Flemmings of Bratton, who held it through his wife's family. Her name was Beaupre. Raleigh was Pateshull's clerk. Later, Bracton became Raleigh's clerk.

== Cosmopolitan outlook ==
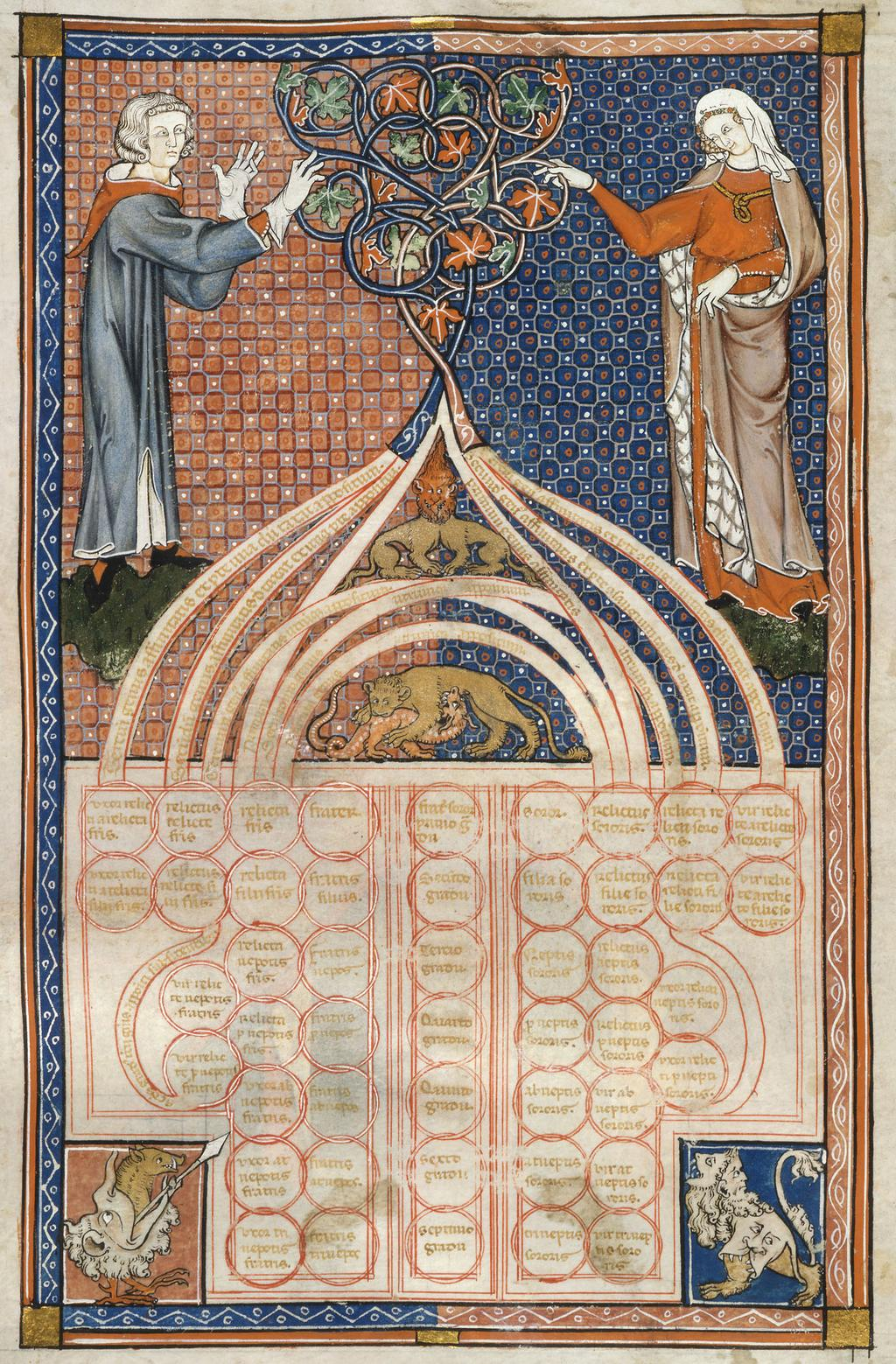
Bracton was influenced by the Decretum Gratiani

Bracton imbued the courts of his day with a broad, continental or cosmopolitan outlook. The incorporation of Roman law began with Ranulf de Glanvill 140 years before. This is demonstrated in Leges Henrici Primi (Laws of Henry I). There is some controversy about the true nature of Bracton's Romanism. Henry Maine regarded Bracton as a complete fraud, who tried to pass off sheer Romanism as legitimate English law. Bracton should for that be completely dismissed as a figure of substance in the formation of English law. Frederic William Maitland held the opposite view, positing that Bracton had no real knowledge of Roman law and the portion that he proclaimed was incomplete and shallow. They were of the opinion that most, if not all, of the Romanism of Bracton had been derived directly from Azo of Bologna, written before 1211. It has proven to be difficult to pinpoint the exact nature of Romanism in Bracton.

When England was conquered by the Normans in 1066, it came under the influence of the most progressive and best governed system in Europe. It also brought a connection with the entire intellectual life of the Continent that had been absent in the Anglo-Saxon days. Foreigners came to England to study. English youth attended European universities. The only English Pope in history, Pope Adrian IV was elected in 1154. That can be attributed to Norman influence. On the Continent in the 12th and the 13th centuries, there was a renaissance in all learning, especially in legal concepts and writing. In Europe, Irnerius, the Four Doctors and Accursius revived the study of civil law. These established the school of the Glossators (writers of a "gloss" or short description of the case). Gratian systematised canon law. The Lombard Libri Feudorum and the French Beaumanoir reduced to some sort of order the customary feudal law of Europe. Ranulf de Glanvill and Bracton did the same thing for England by following the spirit of the Continent.

Bracton was influenced by an early 12th-century lawbook, Leges Edwardi Confessoris. It is a collection that purportedly recorded the laws and customs current in the time of Edward the Confessor at the behest of his successor, William the Conqueror.

William reorganised the land structure in a piecemeal fashion, following the reduction of resistance in various parts of England. His major lords were granted new titles of the land, but the Anglo-Saxon legal structure was left largely intact, including the traditional sheriff (shire reeve) and courts of shire and hundred. Maitland is of the opinion that the law of William I and his successors was biased in favour of all things West Saxon (Wessex) and the Church and eschewed and denigrated all things Danelaw. Bracton freely intermixes the Middle English terms such as sac and soc, toll and term, infangthef, utfangthef, thane, dreng, sokeman, hide, geld, hundred, wapentake, bote, wite and wer with Norman French terms such as baron, count, viscount, vavasor, villein, relief, homage, manor.

== Writings ==
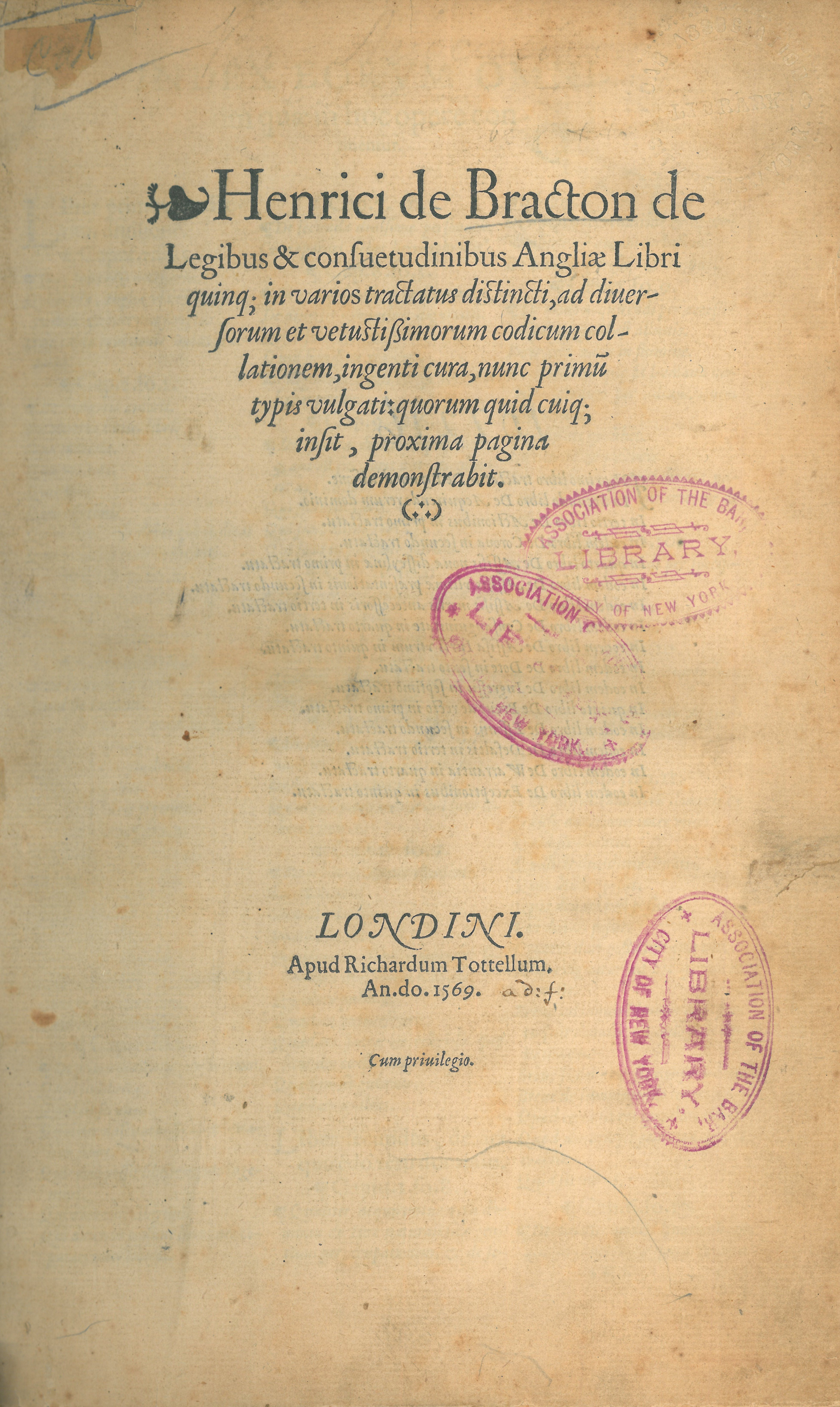
The title page of the first edition of Henry de Bracton's De legibus & consuetudinibus Angliæ (The Laws and Customs of England, 1569)

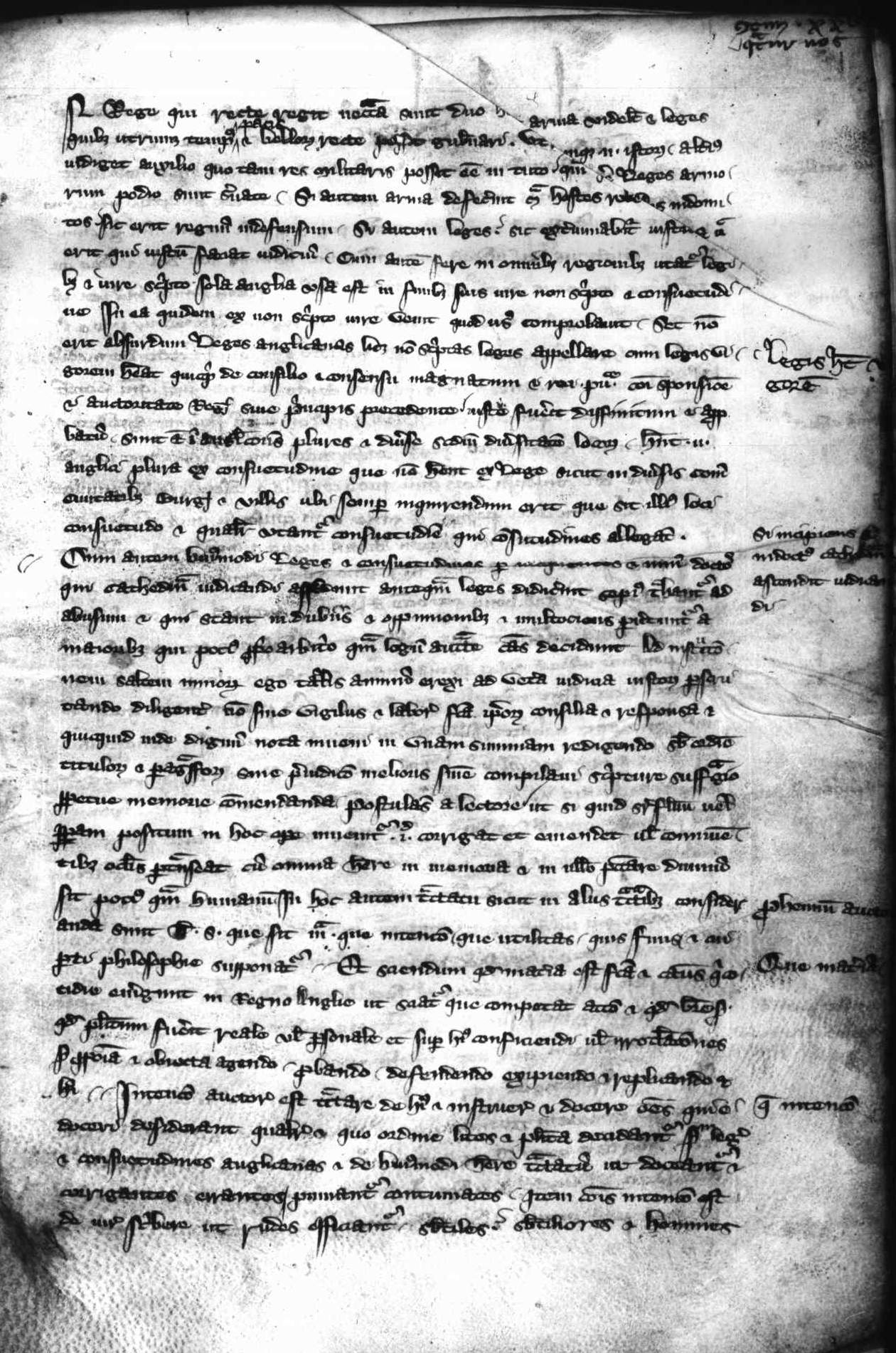
De legibus Angliæ, 13th-century manuscript, Wren Library, Cambridge.

His written work, De legibus et consuetudinibus Angliæ (The Laws and Customs of England), was composed primarily before c. 1235. Most of the text was likely written by William of Raleigh and was then passed along to Bracton, who was his clerk. Bracton's contribution was largely to update the text to include, for example, changes made in the provisions of Merton in 1236. However, the true nature of Bracton's work is not clear. Pollock, Maitland, and Plucknett credit the work more to Bracton and less to the influence of Raleigh. These scholars date the work to a later time, closer to 1260. The work was never completed. According to these authors, the Second Barons' War ended the writing. Bracton had access to (or actual possession of) many rolls of recorded law cases from the King's court. These were called plea rolls and were usually not publicly available. It is probable he was forced to surrender these before his book was finished. Even in its unfinished state, it is the most thorough English medieval law book. He also likely had access to the cases of Martin Pateshull and William Raleigh, his mentors in the law. A notebook containing 2000 cases from Pateshull and Raleigh has been deemed to be Bracton's. This book contains notes written in the margin that are in Bracton's handwriting. He incorporated the information from these cases in his book. Bracton also studied noted Italian lawyer Azo of Bologna. He was familiar with Corpus Iuris Civilis (Body of [Latin] Civil Law), the Decretum and the Decretals, as well as the works of the canonist Tancred of Bologna. He became familiar with, and an advocate of the Latin concept of Universal Law or Natural Moral Law, based on his reading of these sources. Bracton would have been familiar with the description of natural moral law applied in the Decretals: "The natural law dates from the creation of the rational creature. It does not vary with time, but remains unchangeable." He also was familiar with Isidore of Seville or Isidorus Hispalensis (c. 570–636) who wrote of law: "In determining the nature of law, there must be three conditions: the fostering of religion, in as much as it is proportionate to the Divine law; that it is helpful to discipline, in as much as it is proportionate to the natural law; and that is further the common weal, in as much as it is proportionate to the utility of mankind." Bracton used these works as a basis for his legal philosophy. Certain Latin terms, such as "corpus et animus" (body and soul) being necessary for possession under the law, are seen in Bracton that would appear to be ecclesiastical in origin.

Based on Bracton's notes and writing, Pollock and Maitland believe that he was neither a courtly flatterer nor a champion of despotic monarchy. At other times, he may be accused of distorting: "sed et quod principi placuit."

Bracton's work became the basis for legal literature of Edward I of England. Gilbert Thornton, the chief justice of the king's bench made an epitome of it. This has been lost.

The earliest mention of Roman Law in the Common Law of England is found in 1237–1238, discussing a question of whether a palatinate can be partitioned among co-heirs. The justices could find no precedent for such a thing in English law, nor in the Magna Carta, nor in Roman Law (in iure scripto), therefore, they adjourned (delayed) their decision. In Bracton's time, it had been determined that the Emperor of the Holy Roman Empire was deemed to be a subject of the King of England while in England: Ricardus Rex Alemanniae (Rex Romanorum semper augustus) was impleaded for novel disseisin.

Bracton studied the form of the original writs. He procured, for his own use, complete transcripts of the pleadings in selected cases. These were used to write his treatise on the law. He was also the first to offer commentary on the cases he wrote about. In this way Bracton was modern; he criticised and praised various decisions. He called those who were a generation before him, his "masters". The cases he wrote about were at least twenty years older than his book. His writing is not like a modern legal treatise comparing case results. There is no concept of case law as one would find in a modern text book. He selected cases and wrote a general description of what the law should be in a given set of circumstances. There was no real stare decisis. He gave descriptions of what the decision should be in hypothetical fact situations, without mention of actual cases. He also included many sample writs for various situations. Bracton chose cases based on his admiration for the judges involved, and wanted to make exemplars of their logic. The inclusion of case law was important, because it was the first time this had occurred in English legal writing. Lawyers for two centuries (thirteenth and fourteenth centuries) were introduced to the concept of case law and legal logic by Bracton's book. A new and modern course was set.

Later manuals, based on Bracton's example contained actual case law, with the captions removed. The ability to read actual cases and decisions, as well as the logic behind them was revolutionary in Bracton's time. The rolls from the court records would not have been available for inspection to anyone. His treatise changed this, forever. The ability to read cases, even if they were more than twenty years old, proved popular, leading directly to publication of the Year Books The first Year Book (compilations of court cases for the year) extant was published the year that Bracton died, 1268.

=== Translations ===
The modern edition of Bracton's work was published in 1968 by the Selden Society in translation by Samuel E. Thorne from a recompilation by George E. Woodbine. Bracton's Note Book was published in 1887 at Cambridge, as edited and translated by Frederic William Maitland. In 1866, Karl Güterbock published Bracton and his Relation to the Roman Law.

== Church and state ==
=== Common law and ecclesiastic courts ===
In Bracton's time, the common law was separate from the canon law of the Church. The common law had come to mean all that was not exceptional or special. It was distinguished from Church law, as well as peculiar local customs and royal decrees, and represented the general law of the land. There were some legislative acts, such as the Statute of Merton (1236) and the Statute of Marlborough (1267), but the mass of new law introduced during the reign of Henry III of England was by novel creative writs and new forms of action invented in the Court of Chancery and sanctioned by the common law courts. Bracton knew many writs that were unknown to Ranulf de Glanvill. It was generally perceived that there had to be a limitation on the number of new writs coming out of chancery, or the king would become an uncontrollable lawmaker. Chancery was under the control of the Church and ecclesiastic lawyers.

=== Writs for calling religious clergy to royal courts ===
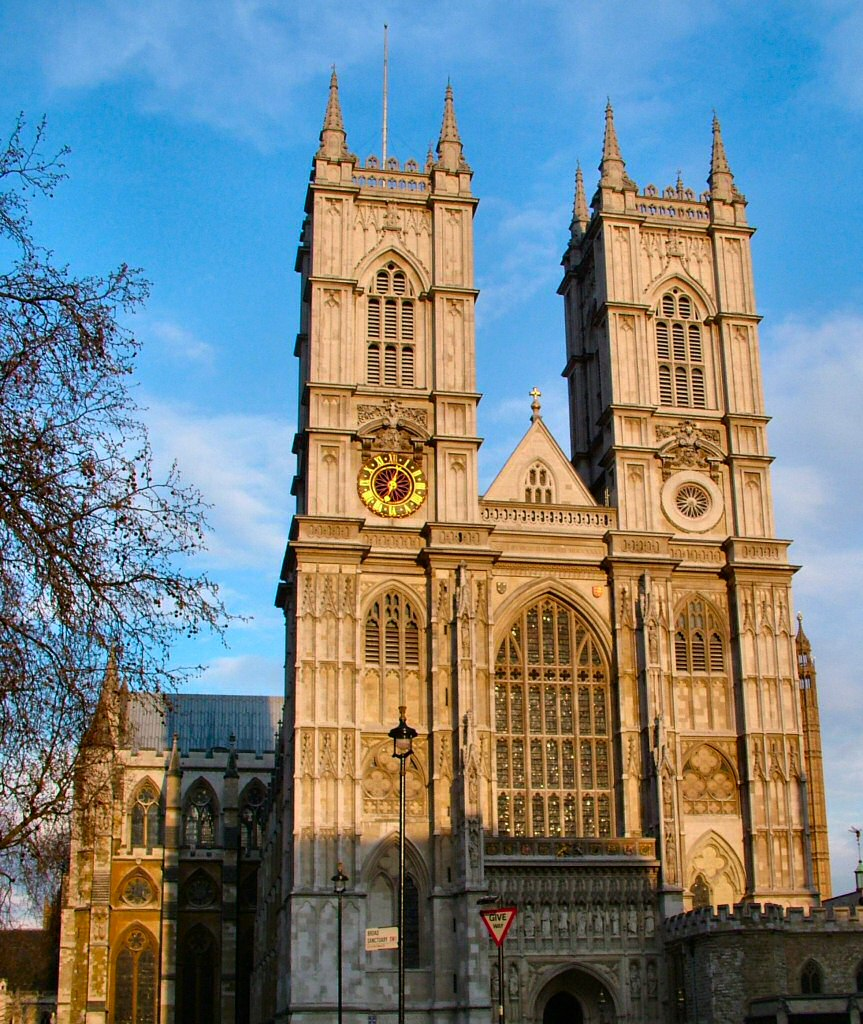
Bracton was concerned with the interaction of Church and State. The picture shows Westminster Abbey in west London, where kings and queens are crowned.

Since the time of the Norman Conquest, the relation between church and state was always tendentious. There were two parallel legal systems, one under the aegis of the church and the other under the crown, which continuously vied for jurisdiction and power. Bracton gave samples of writs that could be used in the case of a recalcitrant bishop who refused to produce a witness for the common law or king's court. They indicated difficulties in defining jurisdiction, as well as recalcitrance on the part of Church officials to partake in civil and common law matters outside the Church court structure.

Example 1: "Henry by the grace of God, etc. to the venerable Father in Christ "B", by the same grace bishop of London, greeting. We order you to cause to come before our justices etc. at such a day, such an archdeacon, to answer [the questions proposed in] "C", with respect to such a plea [as stated above], etc. And then let this clause be added: "as to whom our sheriff of Middlesex has sent word to our aforementioned justices that the aforementioned archdeacon (or such other clerk) has refused to find pledges and has no lay fee by which he can be destrained. And have this writ [brought with you]. Witnesses signed, etc. If the bishop does nothing with regard to the king's order, let the enrolment then be as follows: 'A' offered himself on the fourth day against 'B' with respect to such a plea, and 'B' did not come, and at another time the sheriff was ordered to attach him, and the sheriff sent word that he was a clerk, etc., whereupon such a bishop was ordered to cause him to come and to send the writ, who did nothing therein. Therefore let the bishop be summoned to appear on such a day and to have there the aforementioned 'B' to answer the aforementioned 'A' as to why etc. as described in the original writ, and offer an explanation why he ignored the original order to appear."

Example 2: "The king to the sheriff, greeting. Summon 'F' bishop of London by good summoners to be before the aforesaid justices on such a day, etc. And show why he did not cause him to come forward [in accord with the order in the previous writ]."

Example 3: "The king to the sheriff, greeting, We order you to distrain 'F', bishop of London, by the lands that he holds in barony in your county, to appear before the justices, etc., on such a day and to have there such a clerk to answer to such a one with respect to such a plea etc., and also to hear his judgment because he did not have the aforesaid clerk on such a day as he was ordered. And have, etc. If neither the bishop nor the clerk come forward on that day, let action be taken against the bishop for contempt, by counsel of the court, and lest the misdeeds remain unpunished, let the king, on the bishop's default, apply his hand, by virtue of his jurisdiction, that the clerk be arrested and held until the bishop claims him, that he either be delivered to him or remain arrested, nor will the sheriff or his bailiffs incur any penalty on that account since execution of the law involves no wrong. For even a bishop and those higher still may be arrested for injuries and crimes. A bishop could expel with impunity a thief who had fled to a church and not be guilty of irregularity, if the thief refused to come out and stand to the judgment of the king and the kingdom. For the sword ought to aid the sword, and thus there are two swords, the spiritual and the temporal."

=== Bracton on King of England ===
Bracton on the King of England: "The king has a superior, namely, God. Also the law by which he was made king. Also his curia, namely, the earls and barons, because if he is without a bridle, that is without law, they ought to put the bridle on him."

"The king has no equal within his realm. Subjects cannot be the equals of the ruler, because he would thereby lose his rule, since equal can have no authority over equal, not a fortiori a superior, because he would then be subject to those subjected to him. The king must not be under man but under God and under the law, because the law makes the king... for there is no rex where will rules rather than lex."

=== Papal supremacy asserted ===
Pope Innocent III represented the absolute zenith of papal power in the Middle Ages. Among the many reforms that he established was the banning of any ecclesiastic to have income from more than one church or parish. Bracton had received a dispensation to receive the proceeds from three, which indicates his special position within the Church's political structure. Innocent III exercised more power than any of his predecessors or his successors. He famously placed England under interdict during the reign of John of England. During and after the Fourth Lateran Council, Innocent III proclaimed that all tithes to the Church should take precedence over any taxes imposed by a state, which was controversial. He also excluded all lay interference (including matters of civil and criminal law). He affirmed the right of Rome to review any and all important legal cases. That made appeal to the Pope more attractive and easier to obtain than in previous generations. He gave the Chancery an improved and more efficient organisation. All of that had occurred in the generation before Bracton and still was rancorous in his time.

It has been argued and unsettled whether any English Churchman in the 13th century would have disputed that the Pope was the head of the Universal Church. It was admitted that the canon law of the great councils was binding upon all members of the Church. Bracton, being both a lawyer and a cleric, wrote of the Pope in spiritualibus super omnibus habet ordinariam jurisdictionem ("In spiritual things he has an ordinary jurisdiction over all men in his realm"). The Pope was a lawgiver, but he was also a judge, and in his Curia, could enforce his decrees. Papal legislation was defined and circumscribed by ius divinium et naturale (law divine and natural).

=== Contract and writ of prohibition ===
The development of contract law began in the Church courts by following Roman law. Those courts claimed (with some validity) to enforce all promises made by oath, or by "pledge of faith". The man who pledges his faith or on his soul arguably has pawned his soul and in so doing has left his salvation to actions of another. Henry II of England asserted his jurisdiction over such cases. Thomas Becket claimed concurrent jurisdiction for the Church. Henry won, and from that time onward, the royal court was always at the ready to prohibit ecclesiastical judges from entertaining a breach of faith unless both parties were clerks (church clerics) or the matter lay outside the realm of the temporal. The method was to issue a writ of prohibition, prohibiting the church court from hearing and ruling on the case.

The practice developed whereby a contractor would seek relief in a church court and renounce all right to a writ of prohibition. Sometimes, the litigant would not receive the decision he wanted in the ecclesiastic court and then would renounce his pledge, and seek a writ of prohibition from the common law court. Bracton explained that it was a terrible sin to seek a writ of prohibition when one had promised not to seek one, and that was a crime that deserved imprisonment. Jurisdiction over such matters, as well as over marriages and wills remained contentious in Bracton's day.

=== Frankalmoign and writ of prohibition ===
In Bracton's time, the question frequently arose about land held in frankalmoign (land donated to the Church). Writs were common to prohibit Church courts from meddling into the title of land, even if it were to be held in frankalmoign. The question was that of lay fee, which was the equivalent of secular lands even though it may have been held in free, pure and perpetual alms. Bracton posited that land that is sacred, housing Churches and the like, was within the jurisdiction of the Church. To that could be added lands donated in the form of a dower. A glance of the plea rolls demonstrates them to be covered with writs of prohibitions directed at ecclesiastical judges in a continuous battle over jurisdiction of Church lands.

Despite those problems, Pollock and Maitland comment that by the end of the reign of Henry III, the royal and church courts functioned in relative harmony, despite certain disputes over jurisdiction.

== Modern liability ==
Modern liability can be traced from ancient Anglo-Saxon law through the time of Bracton. From Alfred the Great: "A man acts at his own peril. If a man have a spear over his shoulder, and any man stakes himself upon it, that man will pay the wer but not the wite... if he be accused of wilfulness in the deed, let him clear himself according to the wite, and with that, let the wite abate. And let this be: if the point be three fingers higher than the hindmost part of the shaft; if they both be on the level, the point of the hindmost part of the shaft, be that without danger. If a man leaves his arms about, and another knocks them over so that they kill or injure a man, the owner is liable. If a man lend his horse to another and the borrower is injured, the lender is liable." That is similar to the modern concept of strict liability in tort. Liability at the time was dependent upon not negligence but the act.

A borough custom proclaimed that a defendant must swear an oath that he had done nothing to a slain person that had put him "nearer to death than from life."

Ancient law could not discuss the question of intent because it had no mechanism to do so. Offences that were not criminal could be made the ground for appeal of homicide if they could be put forward as conducing, however indirectly, to death. That idea persisted to the time of Bracton. An oath was required of a man accused of a homicide.

Judge Brian wrote in 1466 (200 years after Bracton): "In my opinion, if a man does a thing he is bound in such a manner that by his deed no injury or damage is inflicted on others. As in the case where I erect a building, and when the timber is being lifted a piece of it falls upon the house of my neighbor and bruises his house, he will have a good action, and that, although the erection of my house was lawful and the timber fell without my intent. Similarly, if a man commits an assault upon me and I cannot avoid him if he wants to beat me, and I lift my stick in self-defense in order to prevent him, and there is a man behind me, although my lifting my stick was lawful to defend myself and I injured him without intent [he would have a cause of action against me]."

In the laws of Cnut the Great it was said that concerning stolen property, an infant was as guilty as if he had discretion. Under Henry I, "The man whose conduct has only remotely caused death or injury is liable, it is true, but 'in hiis et similibus, ubi homo aliud intendit et aliud evenit, ubi opus accusatur non-voluntas, venialem pocius emendacionem, et honrificenciam judices statuant, sicut acciderit'". The man who has killed by misadventure or in self-defense is liable to pay the wer, but his wrong is emenable.

Under Henry I, "who sins unwittingly shall knowingly make amends" though the lunatic and infant were not liable in criminal acts, which was a change from Anglo-Saxon law. Bracton wrote of homicide, "the crime of homicide, be it either accidental or voluntary, does not permit of suffering the same penalty, because on one case the full penalty must be exacted and in the other there should have been mercy." It is the first sign of discrimination in the law leading to the development of the concept of mens rea (a guilty mind being necessary to be guilty of a crime). Bracton stressed the animus furendi in theft, which is the intention to steal. Felony is according to intent, a concept that has its foundations in Bracton.

== Other examples ==
=== Sanctuary and abjuration ===
If a criminal could make it to a church, he was given sanctuary. This was a recognition that the Church was a separate jurisdiction. Some law allowed for the criminal to be housed and fed by the clergy for seven days. Bracton recommends 40 days. Then, the reeve would knock on the door of the church and demand that the criminal surrender himself or take the shortest road to a seaport and leave England never to return. If he did not leave the church, he was to be starved. If the criminal stayed on the road to the seaport, he was to be left unharmed. If he went off the road, he could be killed by the population at large. Condemned criminals and those found with stolen goods were not to be given sanctuary. The wife of such was declared a widow, and all lands owned by him were escheated to the Crown.

=== Writ of appeal ===
"In every criminal case, which embraces a felony, [the writ] must mention on the appeal the year, the place, the day and the hour in which the case is heard. [The defendant] must speak of his own accord, and sight and hearing, and must be consistent in what he says and in all circumstantial details. [It should be written like this]: 'A' appeals 'B', by such words for the death of his brother and should he fail, by such a one, and so on, so that there are several appealing him to one and the same deed."

=== Equity ===
Bracton wrote of equity (circa 1258) that it required in equal causes an even-handed justice and a true equality in all things. This appears to have been taken directly from Azo's "Gloss of Roman Law".

=== Executor of estate ===
The executor of an estate could sue only in ecclesiastical courts. At law, it was the heir who had to be sued. That was changed during the time of Edward I of England to allowing him to be sued in the common law courts.

=== Murder-fines ===
The reason for devising the murder-fine was that in the days of Cnut the Great, King of the Danes, when at the prayer of the English barons he sent his army back to Denmark after he had conquered and pacified England, the barons of England offered themselves as sureties to Cnut that whatever force the king kept with him in England they would have form peace in all things, if any of the English should kill one of the men the king kept with him and the killer could not make his defence against the charge by the judgment of God, that is "by water and iron", justice would be done upon him. If he fled and could not be arrested they would pay the king, on his behalf, sixty-six marks, to be collected in the village where he was slain, because the inhabitants did not produce the slayer. And if the marks could not be collected because of poverty, they would be collected in the hundred.

That represents a curious anachronism since trial by ordeal ("water and iron") had been outlawed in England by the Fourth Lateran Council of 1215. (See subpoena ad testificandum for details.)

== Influence ==
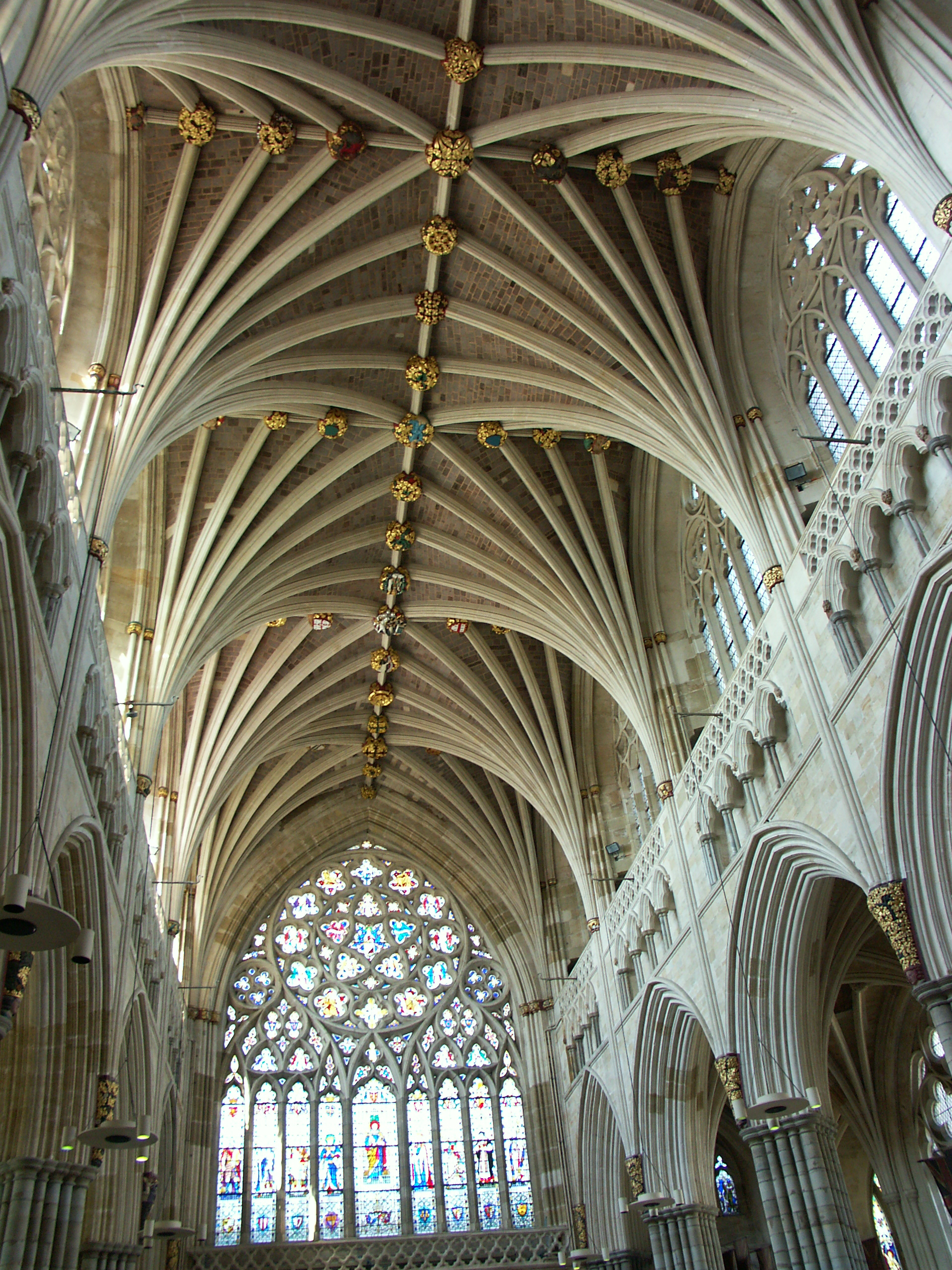
Bracton was chancellor of Exeter Cathedral, where he is buried.

The reign of King John of England (1199–1216) was a time of great turmoil that produced, among other things, Magna Carta and the Papal interdict of Pope Innocent III against John. Henry III (1216–1272) was a child of nine years when he ascended the throne. A few great nobles, encouraged by Pope Honorius III (1216–1227) spared the nation the turmoil that would have been expected when a child becomes king. Henry de Bracton arose as one of the greatest judges of all time during the middle part of the reign of Henry III. His case books would soon dwarf even the great work of Ranulf de Glanvill in both quantity and quality.

The Barons' War against Henry III began in 1258 with similar grievances as the previous revolt against King John in 1215. The Barons aimed to reduce the King's power, but they failed as they also had in 1215. An indirect result of this war was that Bracton failed to complete his great legal treatise. The forms of action in trespass "vi et armis", among other forms of action in trespass and seisin were developed at this time. The phrase of Simon de Montfort, 6th Earl of Leicester was, "Wars are the result of extra-judicial distress." This is an important observation to understand the time of Bracton. The use of war was another tool, beside the rule of law, for the powerful to attain their ends. The barons' grievances resulted in the Statute of Marlborough in 1267.

Plucknett writes "It was the mediaevalists in England, armed with Bracton and the Year Books who ended Stuart statecraft. The Constitution of the United States was written by men who had Magna Carta and Bracton, and Coke and Littleton before their eyes. Could anything be more medieval than the idea of due process or the insertion in an instrument of government a contract clause? 'Pacta sunt servanda' (Pacts should be kept) became a motto of Edward I. The result can be traced directly to the work and writings of Bracton.

It was Machiavelli who gave us the modern word "state" and fleshed it out to our present conception of it. In Bracton's time a state was defined by a king, based on the rule of law, which ultimately must end in and lead to the will of God. This is different today. The right is based on the will of the state.

Bracton was popular in his day. Several contemporaneous copies of his book are still in existence. However, several scholars, including Plucknett and Holdsworth believe that few actually followed Bracton's doctrine as defined by his writings. The growth of procedure overwhelmed the general (and genial) view and wide learning of Bracton. For a time, he fell completely out of favour. The printing press restored Bracton to prominence in English legal literature. The edition published in 1569 was described by Plucknett as "...perhaps the best printed law book we have ever had." Bracton's work appeared at an important time during the reign of Queen Elizabeth.

Bracton's liberal interpretation of the law (as expressed in portions of his book) was slow in taking root in English law. The decline of Bracton's influence in the middle of the fourteenth century coincides with Parliament's first assertions of its powers. Already, it had come to be the principal and only legislative body, and the dominant interest in it was that of the common law lawyers. This had become a narrow profession. The Crown adopted the practice of appointing judges from the leading practitioners of the bar. These also controlled legal education. There was no liberal outlook on the law. To these, Bracton's treatise must have seemed impractical and academic. Justice became more centralised.

Prior to Bracton, there was little use of stare decisis. This was because the rolls containing the court records were largely unavailable for scrutiny, even by judges sitting on the bench. Bracton's use of the rolls led to promulgation of recorded cases in the form of a gloss. This had been an important innovation based on the glossator's practice from the Continent. The availability of previous decisions, even if 20 or more years old, proved to be of great interest to nearly all practitioners of the law. This led directly to the Year Books. A single unique decision did not make precedent. Custom began to be dictated when several cases of similar fact pattern were decided by different courts in the same way. This was the beginning of stare decisis.

Sir Thomas Smith, the Secretary of State for Queen Elizabeth I, wrote De Republica Anglorum in the 1560s; it was published posthumously in 1583. In it he set forth the truly fearful powers of the Crown and Parliament, which can make and unmake law, change rights and possessions of private men, legitimate bastards, establish religions, condemn or absolve (by attainders) whomever the Prince wills. Smith was no advocate of tyranny, but he clearly enjoyed enumerating an imposing list of powers of the Tudor state. In Bracton, on the other hand, the emphasis was not upon the power of the Crown, but in responsibility. The monarch was subject to God, to the law of the land, and to his feudal court. In Bracton, the king owed some responsibility to listen to his lords. (Recall that Bracton had observed and experienced the turmoil from the Barons' War, and lived in the backwash of the problems of John.) Bracton's writings became a de facto antidote to the absolutism of the Tudors and the Stuarts. Bracton brought an air of clarity, from his study of Roman order, to the confusion that followed the English Reformation. The anonymous re-publisher of Bracton recommends him as worthy of emulation, since the other books of the day were "indigesta confusio". The law under Elizabeth was medieval. The trend of the day was toward Romanism. Bracton was popular in the time of Elizabeth because he was available through the printing press. In later times, he was read because he was Roman. He was popular because he was medieval.

Bracton was commonly read by lawyers in Great Britain's American colonies in the 18th century, and was occasionally cited in pre-revolutionary colonial argumentation against the mother country.

== Sayings ==
- Non sub homine, sed sub Deo et lege.

"Not under man but under God and the law."

== See also ==
- Battle of Evesham
- Cnut the Great
- Edward I of England
- Edward the Confessor
- Elizabeth I of England
- Exeter Cathedral
- Henry I of England
- Henry II of England
- Henry III of England
- Isidore of Seville
- Isidorus Hispalensis
- John of England
- Mad Parliament
- Provisions of Oxford
- Quia Emptores
- Richard I of England
- St. Paul's Cathedral
- Second Barons' War
- Simon de Montfort, 6th Earl of Leicester
- Statute of Marlborough
- Trover
