= Bibliography of law =

This list is a legal bibliography.

A book can be included on this list only if it meets these criteria:

(1) The book is already in an existing legal bibliography that is a reliable source.
(2) Although the book is not in such a bibliography, at least one reliable source says the book is suitable for inclusion in such a bibliography.

In other words, this bibliography includes books that only reliable, authoritative sources have said must, should be, or could be in a reliable legal bibliography.

- A Bibliographical Guide to the Law of the United Kingdom, the Channel Islands, and the Isle of Man
- A First Book of English Law
- A Legal Bibliography of the British Commonwealth of Nations
- Archbold Criminal Pleading, Evidence and Practice
- Atiyah's Accidents, Compensation and the Law
- Austin, The Province of Jurisprudence Determined
- Bacon's Abridgement
- Bailey's Law of Wills
- Beaumanoir, Coutumes de Beauvaisis
- Black Book of the Admiralty
- Black's Law Dictionary
- Blackstone, A Discourse on the Study of the Law
- Blackstone, An Analysis of the Laws of England
- Blackstone's Commentaries
- Blackstone's Criminal Practice
- Bouvier's Law Dictionary
- Bracton, De Legibus et Consuetudinibus Angliae
- Bridgman's Legal Bibliography
- Britton
- Brooke's Abridgment
- Brunner, The Sources of English Law
- Butterworth's Annotated Legislation Service
- Card, Cross and Jones: Criminal Law
- Chronological Table of the Statutes
- Coke's Institutes
- Comyns' Digest
- Cowley, A Bibliography of Abridgments, Digests, Dictionaries, and Indexes of English Law to the Year 1800
- Current Law Statutes Annotated
- Daniel, History and Origin of the Law Reports
- D'Anvers' Abridgment
- Davis' Criminal Law Consolidation Acts
- Dworkin, Taking Rights Seriously
- Encyclopaedia of Forms and Precedents
- Ensor, Defects of the English Laws and Tribunals
- Fitzherbert, New Natura Brevium
- Fitzherbert's Abridgment
- Fleta
- Foss, Biographia Juridica
- Foster's Crown Law
- Fox, Handbook of English Law Reports
- Friend, Anglo-American Legal Bibliographies
- Gilmore, The Death of Contract
- Glanvill
- Grotius, De jure belli ac pacis
- Hale, Historia Placitorum Coronae
- Halsbury's Laws of England
- Halsbury's Statutes
- Halsbury's Statutory Instruments
- Hart, The Concept of Law
- Hawkins' Pleas of the Crown
- Hoffman's Course of Legal Study
- Hollond, English Legal Authors Before Blackstone
- Holmes, The Common Law
- Ilbert, Legislative Methods and Forms
- Information Sources in Law
- Jelf, Where to Find Your Law
- Kelsen, Pure Theory of Law
- Kent's Commentaries
- Kenny's Outlines of Criminal Law
- Law Books in Print
- Lawyers' Law Books
- Maine, Ancient Law
- Marvin's Legal Bibliography
- Moran, The Alphabet of the National Insurance Act, 1911.
- Moran, The Boarding House Proprietor and His Guest
- Moran, The Heralds of the Law
- Odgers on Libel and Slander
- Rastall, The Abbreviacion of Statutis
- Rastall, Termes de la Ley
- Russell on Crime
- Rolle's Abridgment
- Select Essays in Anglo-American Legal History
- Simpson, Biographical Dictionary of the Common Law
- Smith, Hogan and Ormerod's Criminal Law
- Szladits' Bibliography on Foreign and Comparative Law
- St Germain, Doctor and Student
- Stair, Institutions of the Law of Scotland
- Statutes in Force
- Stone's Justices' Manual
- Stroud's Judicial Dictionary
- The Digest
- Vattel, Les droit des gens
- Viner's Abridgment
- Wallace's Reporters
- Wheaton, Elements of International Law
- Williams, Learning the Law
- Winfield, The Chief Sources of English Legal History
- Where to Look for Your Law
- Words and Phrases Legally Defined

== See also ==
- Bibliography of English criminal law
