= Bibliography of Jersey =

This is a list of books in the English language which deal with Jersey and its geography, history, inhabitants, culture, biota, etc.

- Anderson, O. D. – Analysing Time Series: Proceedings of the International Conference Held in Guernsey, Channel Islands, in October 1979.
- Ansted, David Thomas and Robert Gordon Latham – The Channel Islands.
- A Bibliographical Guide to the Law of the United Kingdom, the Channel Islands, and the Isle of Man.
- Balleine's History of Jersey - Marguerite Syvret and Joan Stevens (1998) ISBN 1-86077-065-7
- Cruickshank, Charles – The German Occupation of the Channel Islands.
- Dobson, Roderick – The Birds of the Channel Islands.
- Dumaresq, Philip – Philip Dumaresq’s Map of Jersey.
- Dury, G. – The Channel Islands.
- Eagleston, A. J. – The Channel Islands under Tudor Government, 1485-1642: A Study in Administrative History.
- Elliott, B. B. – Jersey: An Isle of Romance.
- Fraser, David – The Jews of the Channel Islands and the Rule of Law, 1940-1945: 'Quite contrary to the Principles of British Justice'.
- Hawkes, Jacquetta – The Archaeology of the Channel Islands, Vol. 2: The Bailiwick of Jersey.
- Horwood, A. R. – A Hand-list of the Lichens of Great Britain, Ireland and the Channel Islands.
- Jamieson, A. G. – A People of the Sea: The Maritime History of the Channel Islands.
- Jee, Nigel – The Landscape of the Channel Islands.
- Jones, R., D. Keen, J. Birnie, and P. Waton – Past Landscapes of Jersey: Environmental Change During the Last Ten Thousand Years.
- Keeton, G. W., Dennis Lloyd, and George W. Keeton – The British Commonwealth: The Development of Its Laws and Constitutions, Volume 1: The United Kingdom, Part 2: Scotland and the Channel Islands.
- Kendrick, T. D. – The Archaeology of the Channel Islands.
- King, Peter – The Channel Islands War, 1940-1945.
- L’Amy, John H. – Jersey Folk Lore.
- Liddicoat, Anthony – A Grammar of the Norman French of the Channel Islands: The Dialects of Jersey and Sark.
- Lockley, R. M. – The Charm of the Channel Islands.
- Maxwell, W. Harold and Leslie F. Maxwell – A Legal Bibliography of the British Commonwealth of Nations, Volume 1: English Law to 1800, including Wales, the Channel Islands and the Isle of Man.
- Morris, Joseph E. – Beautiful Britain: The Channel Islands.
- Perrin, William F., Bernd Würsig & J. G. M. Thewissen – Encyclopedia of Marine Mammals.
- Peterson, C. D., D. A. Pearlman, T. D. Dines, H. R. Arnold, and Jane M. Croft – New Atlas of the British & Irish Flora: An Atlas of the Vascular Plants of Britain, Ireland, the Isle of Man and the Channel Islands.
- Ramisch, Heinrich – Variation of English in Guernsey/Channel Islands.
- Ramsey, Winston G. – The War in the Channel Islands: Then and Now.
- Richard, John D. and David McClintock – Wild Flowers of the Channel Islands.
- Sheridan, L. A. – The United Kingdom: The Development of Its Laws and Constitution: The Channel Islands.
- Sinel, Joseph – Prehistoric Times and Men of the Channel Islands.
- Spence, N. C. – A Glossary of Jersey-French.

== La Haule editions ==
La Haule Books published a limited edition series of at least 38 Jersey Heritage Editions in the 1980s and 1990s. (The numbers in brackets below are the numbers of copies printed).

- Jersey Folklore – John H. L'Amy, 1983 (750)
- Jersey Through the Centuries: A Chronology of Events and Matters of Interest – Leslie Sinel, 1984 (750)
- The German Occupation of Jersey, the Complete Diary of Events from June 1940 to June 1945 – Leslie Sinel, 1984 (750)
- Jersey Sea Stories – Philip Ahier, 1984 (750)
- L'Archipel de la Manche/The Channel Islands – Victor Hugo/John W. Watson, 1985 (999)
- Three Years Behind Barbed Wire, the Diary of a British Internee in ‘Schloss Wurzach’, Germany – Joan Coles, 1985 (750)
- Jersey Remembered, a Miscellany of Memories and Nostalgia – Brian Skelley and Jack Clarke, 1985 (750)
- Jersey in Jail – Horace Wyatt and Edmund Blampied, 1985 (750)
- These Haunted Islands, a Story of Witchcraft in the Channel Islands – Chris Lake, 1986 (999)
- Dame of Sark, an Autobiography – Sibyl Hathaway, 1986 (750)
- Architecture in Jersey – Maurice Boots, 1986 (750)
- Jersey in Pre-history – Mark Patton, 1987 (750)
- Stories of Jersey Ships – John Jean, 1987 (750)
- Jersey on the Move – Luke Le Moignan, 1987 (750)
- Images of the Past – Chris Lake and Leslie Sinel, 1987 (750)
- Children of the Isles, 1988 (750)
- Jersey Ships and Railways – John Jean, 1989 (750)
- A Picture of Jersey or Stranger's Companion Through that Island – John Stead, 1989 (750)
- Glimpses of Jersey’s Past – Luke Le Moignan, 1990 (750)
- In a Jersey Garden – Veronica Platt, 1990 (750)
- Memoires of a Jerseyman – Ralph Vibert, 1991 (999)
- Impressions of the Channel Islands – Hans Max Von Aufsess/F.J. Turpin, 1991 (750)
- Lest we Forget, Escapes and Attempted Escapes from Jersey During the German Occupation 1940-1945 – Roy Thomas, 1992 (750)
- The Occupation Bicycle Park – H.E. Aubin, 1992 (750)
- A Biographical Dictionary of Jersey, volume I – George Reginald Balleine, 1993 (750)
- A Biographical Dictionary of Jersey, volume II – George Reginald Balleine, 1993 (750)
- The Battle of the Strong, a Romance of Two Kingdoms – Gilbert Parker, 1898 (750)
- Perverse and Foolish, a Jersey Farmer's Son in the British Diplomatic Service – Sir Arthur de la Mare, 1994 (750)
- Tales of Jersey's Tall Ships – Jean John, 1994 (750)
- Remember When...? – Daff Noel, 1995 (?)
- Blood and Stones, an Autobiography – Arthur Ernest Mourant; Gary P. Misson, 1995 (750)
- Jersey’s Roadside Heritage – John Jean, 1996 (750)
- The Way to the Bay — Jackie de Gruchy, 1996 (?)
- A Merry Going Round – Betty Brooke, 1997 (750)
- Caesarea, General History and Description of the Island of Jersey from the Time of Julius Caesar to the Present Period – John Stead, 1997 (750)
- Footprints on a Winding Road, Recollections of an Old Jerseyman – Arthur Frederick Abbott Stamberg LVO, 1998 (750)
- The Occupation of Jersey Day by Day, the personal diary of Deputy Edward Le Quesne member of the States of Jersey Superior Council 1940-1945 – Edward Le Quesne; Michael Ginns, 1999 (750)
