= Blackacre =

In law, name for a fictitious estate

Blackacre, Whiteacre, Greenacre, Brownacre, and variations are the placeholder names used for fictitious estates in land.

The names are used by professors of law in common law jurisdictions, particularly in the area of real property and occasionally in contracts, to discuss the rights of various parties to a piece of land. A typical law school or bar exam question on real property might say:

Adam, owner of a fee simple in Blackacre, conveyed the property "to Bill for life, remainder to Charles, provided that if any person should consume alcohol on the property before the first born son of Charles turns twenty-one, then the property shall go to Dwight in fee simple." Assume that neither Bill, Charles, nor Dwight is an heir of Adam, and that Adam's only heir is his son, Edward. Discuss the ownership interests in Blackacre of Adam, Bill, Charles, Dwight and Edward.

Where more than one estate is needed to demonstrate a point – perhaps relating to a dispute over boundaries, easements or riparian rights – a second estate will usually be called Whiteacre, a third, Greenacre, and a fourth, Brownacre.

== Origin ==
Jesse Dukeminier, author of one of the leading series of textbooks on property, traces the use of Blackacre and Whiteacre for this purpose to a 1628 treatise by Sir Edward Coke. Dukeminier suggests that the term might originate with references to colors associated with certain crops ("peas and beans are black, corn and potatoes are white, hay is green"), or with the means by which rents were to be paid, with black rents payable in produce and white rents in silver. A 1790 treatise by Francis Buller similarly uses these placeholder names, stating: "If A. have Black Acre and C. have White Acre, and A. has a way over White Acre to Black Acre, and then purchases White Acre, the way will be extinct; and if A. afterwards enfeoff C. of White Acre without excepting the road, it is gone".

In various law journals and treatises in Louisiana, which uses a unique form of the civil law influenced by but not identical to the Napoleonic Code, authors have used the term "arpent noir" as a placeholder name for the purpose of discussing rights concerning immovables.

One of the more basic theories is that Blackacre and Whiteacre are related to what professors could draw on dark chalkboards in early law-school settings. A simple outline of the property on the "blackboard" being "blackacre" and a chalk-colored-in property being "whiteacre".

== In popular culture ==
Because of its association with legal education, a number of legal publications and events utilize the name. For example, Blackacre was adopted as the name of the literary journal at the University of Texas School of Law. Blackacre is also the name of a journal at the University of Sydney Law School, published annually by the Sydney University Law Society, the name of the open-air courtyard and weekly student social at Vanderbilt Law School, and the name of a William Mitchell College of Law formal.

Law professor K-Sue Park "found that the terms, infrequent but present in English legal treatises, also constituted the title of a proslavery novel that appeared in 1856, the same year the Court decided Dred Scott, from a prominent Confederate press"–William M. Burwell's White Acre vs. Black Acre (1856). While mistakenly placing the Confederate States of America four years prior to its founding, Park writes, '"White Acre' was an incompetent northern farm and 'Black Acre,' a southern plantation labored upon by loyal, hardworking slaves. It seems likely that the deployment of these terms by a member of a high-profile political family to defend slavery so publicly at this turbulent time might have had some influence on their popular connotations and meaning, or at least as much as obscure English planting terminology." While that is hard to disprove, it is contestable that Blackacre appeared only "infrequent[ly]" before that publication. It appears to refer to property in many leading seventeeth- and eighteenth-century law books, including Sir Edward Coke's Institutes of the Laws of England, Charles Viner's Abridgement of Law, and Matthew Bacon's New Abridgement of Law. It was also the name of the litigious widow, Widow Blackacre, in the seventeenth-century play The Plain Dealer.

The Blackacre Nature Preserve and Historic Homestead in Kentucky was so named by the donor of the land, Macauley Smith, who had been a judge on the Kentucky Court of Appeals. In July 2010, a legal humor website wrote an article chronicling the foreclosure sale of Blackacre. A group of law students in Indianapolis founded a brewery named Black Acre Brewing Co. in late 2010 as a homage to their legal schooling. Monica Youn's 2016 book of poetry from Graywolf Press is titled Blackacre, in reference to the legal concept (Youn has a law degree from Yale).

== See also ==
- Dewey, Cheatem & Howe, another legal placeholder name
