= Digest =

Digest may refer to:

== Biology ==
- Digestion of food
- Restriction digest

== Literature and publications ==
- The Digest, formerly the English and Empire Digest
- Digest size magazine format
- Digest (Roman law), also known as Pandects, a digest of Roman law
- Digest (poetry collection), 2014 poetry collection

== Computer science and electronic security ==
- Digest, a MIME Multipart Subtype
- Digest access authentication
- Digital Geographic Exchange Standard
- Email digest
- Message digest or hash algorithm (in cryptography)

== Other uses ==
- trade name of the drug Lansoprazole

== See also ==
=== Publications ===
- The Literary Digest
- Architectural Digest
- Writer's Digest
- Reader's Digest
- Baseball Digest
- Gun Digest
- Golf Digest
- Consumers Digest
- Inventors Digest
- Football Digest
