= John Bouvier =

American lawyer (1787–1851)

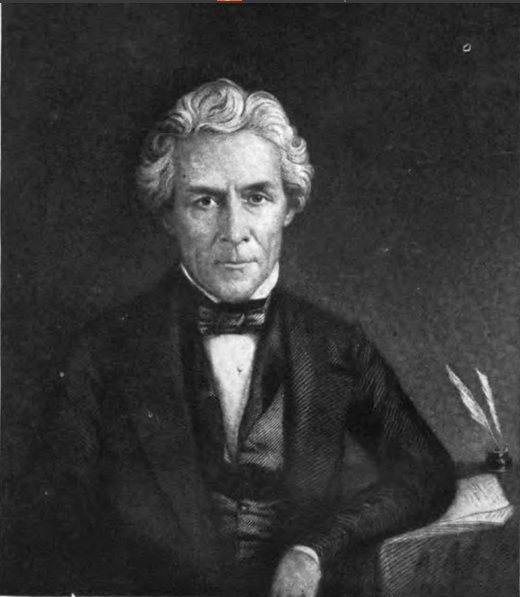
- John Bouvier
- Born: 1787; Codognan, France
- Died: November 18, 1851; Philadelphia, Pennsylvania, U.S.
- Resting place: Laurel Hill Cemetery, Philadelphia, Pennsylvania, U.S.
- Citizenship: France, United States

John Bouvier (1787 – November 18, 1851) was a French-American jurist and legal lexicographer known for his legal writings, particularly his Law Dictionary Adapted to the Constitution and Laws of the United States of America and of the Several States of the American Union (1839). It is believed to be the first legal dictionary to be based on American law, and is still in publication. It has been frequently revised and republished, and was retitled Bouvier's Law Dictionary in 1897. Bouvier also published The Institutes of American Law (1851) and an edition of Matthew Bacon's Abridgment of the Law. Women's rights and suffrage advocates Susan B. Anthony and Elizabeth Cady Stanton cited Bouvier for contributing to passage in Pennsylvania of the Married Woman's Property Act of 1848; suffragist Alice Paul cited him also for his commitment to expanding women's property rights.

== Life ==
John Bouvier was born in 1787 in Codognan, France, in the department du Gard, to Jean Bouvier (1760–1803) and Marie Benezet (1760–1823). They were members of the Quakers. John Bouvier was educated in Nimes.

In 1802, Jean and Marie Bouvier, John Bouvier, and his brother Daniel emigrated to America and settled in Philadelphia. Bouvier's father died within a year of yellow fever, and his mother later returned to France. John Bouvier was apprenticed to age 21 to a Philadelphia Quaker, Benjamin Johnson, a printer and bookseller who had known the family while traveling in France.

In 1808, John Bouvier began a printing business on Cypress Alley in west Philadelphia. In 1810, he married Elizabeth Widdifield (1789–1870), by whom he had one daughter, astronomical writer and cookbook author Hannah Mary Bouvier Peterson (1811–1870). Bouvier became a citizen of the United States in 1812.

By 1814, Bouvier was living in Brownsville, Pennsylvania, where on Wednesday, November 9, 1814, he published the first issue of The American Telegraph. In the weekly newspaper, he resolved to "discountenance factions and factious men" while following an editor's duty of "exposure and support of the truth". In 1818, Bouvier moved to Uniontown, Pennsylvania, where he joined with another periodical to publish The Genius of Liberty and American Telegraph. He continued to be involved in its publication until July 18, 1820.

== Legal career ==
While active as a printer and publisher, Bouvier began to study law, under the tutelage of Andrew Stewart. He was admitted to the bar in Fayette County, Pennsylvania, in 1818. In 1822, he was admitted to serve as an attorney in the Supreme Court of Pennsylvania. In 1823, he moved back to Philadelphia. Bouvier was appointed Recorder of the City of Philadelphia in 1836, by Governor Joseph Ritner, and became an associate justice of the court of criminal sessions of Philadelphia in 1838.

He was best known, however, for his legal writings. Having himself experienced the difficulty of studying treatises based on British laws that no longer applied to the United States, Bouvier wrote his own American law dictionary, Law Dictionary Adapted to the Constitution and Laws of the United States of America and of the Several States of the American Union (1839). He hoped that being "written entirely anew, and calculated to remedy those defects, [it] would be useful to the profession". It is believed to be the first legal dictionary to be based on American law. It was well received by bibliographer Samuel Austin Allibone and by other jurists including Chancellor James Kent of the New York Supreme Court and Justice Joseph Story of the United States Supreme Court. Bouvier himself revised and published new editions in 1843 and 1848. After his death, it continued to be updated and published, and was retitled Bouvier's Law Dictionary by Francis Rawle in 1897. Bouvier also published an edition of Matthew Bacon's Abridgment of the Law (10 volumes, 1842–1846), and a compendium of American law entitled The Institutes of American Law (4 volumes, 1851) that outlined legal principles such as bailment, contracts, and property.

Bouvier died on November 18, 1851, a week after being "stricken with apoplexy" while working at his office. He is buried at Laurel Hill Cemetery in Philadelphia.
