= Odgers =

Odgers is a surname. Notable people with the surname include:

- Candice Odgers, American psychologist
- Cathy Odgers, New Zealand–born, Hong Kong–based former blogger – "Cactus Kate"
- Gary Odgers (born 1959), Australian rules football
- George Odgers (1916–2008), Australian soldier, journalist and military historian
- Jayme Odgers (born 1939), American graphic designer
- Jeff Odgers (born 1969), Canadian professional ice hockey player
- Merle Middleton Odgers, American educator and president of Bucknell University
- William Odgers (1834–1873), British soldier and recipient of the Victoria Cross

== See also ==
- Odger
- Odgers on Libel and Slander
