= Margaret A. Wilcox =

American inventor (1838–1912)

- Born: 1838; Chicago, Illinois, US
- Died: March 30, 1912 (aged 73–74); Los Angeles, California, US
- Occupations: Inventor, mechanical engineer
- Known for: The invention of the car heater, 1893.

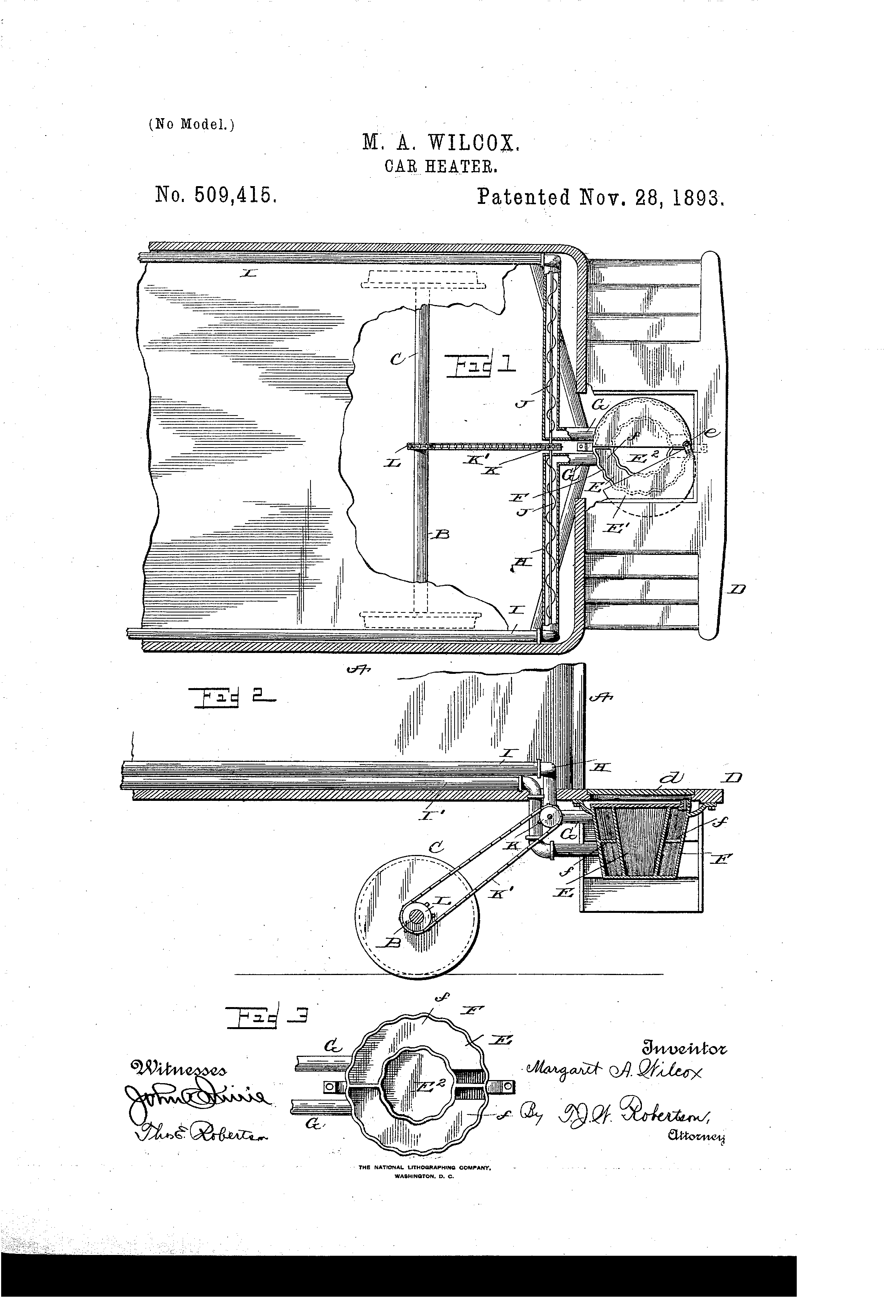
Wilcox's patent for a train car heater, 1893.

Margaret A. Wilcox (1838 – March 30, 1912) was an American mechanical engineer, inventor and entrepreneur who secured at least seven United States patents between 1890 and 1909. She is best known for inventing one of the earliest car heating systems, which she patented on November 28, 1893. She was an innovator who brought the use of interior heating to vehicles, creating the foundation for current day automative air conditioning systems. She developed several other inventions and innovations; some of which include, a multi-function stove that heated both food and water and combined washing machine for dishes and clothing.

== Early life ==
Margaret Wilcox was born in Chicago, Illinois, in 1838. Little is known about her early life, which is normal for women of her time, whose personal histories were often less documented than those of men. Some sources indicate she received technical training in mechanical engineering, though formal records of her education have not been verified. Wilcox was interested in mechanical engineering from a young age, even though the societal norms of her time often kept women from doing much but housework. Being a mechanical engineer was not common at this period, and it was even harder for women to be one. Her work came about at a time when women were not well represented in engineering and invention, and many of their achievements were not well recorded.

== Career and inventions ==
Wilcox invented the train car heater. She also patented a combined clothes washer and dishwasher.

=== Background and motivation ===
Wilcox's inventions were motivated by the desire to simplify commonplace activities. At the end of the nineteenth century, travelers traveling in railway cars through the winters of Chicago had very little shelter from the cold. During that time period, rail trains did not have insulation, and the only heating solutions that were accessible were portable devices such as lanterns and gas lights. These equipment were not only inefficient, but they also offered significant risks of fire. This restriction made early transportation systems much less practicable, particularly in colder places where extreme weather made travel uncomfortable and, at times, unsafe. The concept of harnessing the engine's leftover heat and channeling the warm air that is created by the engine back to the passenger compartments was something that Wilcox began experimenting with. The concept in question was an early attempt to recycle waste energy for human comfort, a premise that continues to play a fundamental role in contemporary engineering systems.

=== Invention of the car heater ===
In her late twenties, Wilcox identified an issue affecting all Chicago railway passengers traveling during cold weather; there was almost no heating and little to no insulation within train cars. Until the time of Wilcox’s solution, passengers endured long periods of extreme cold with nothing but warm clothing and/or other types of warming equipment (portable heaters) that provided very limited warmth. As well as being highly inconvenient and dangerous because they could cause fires.

Wilcox was aware of the fact that many different types of internal combustion engines generated large amounts of excessive waste heat. She then developed her idea for capturing the waste heat that these engines produced and utilizing it to provide warmth to the passenger area inside the railcar. Her design incorporated a combustion chamber located at the bottom of each railcar and a water jacketed casing surrounding the combustion chamber. The casing had vertical dividers and horizontal diaphragms. Hot water from the top portion of the casing traveled up the exterior walls of the railcars via pipes placed near both sides of the floor of the railcars. Return pipes carried cooler water down to the lower portions of the casing where it was heated again. The spiral conveyor connecting the axles of the wheels of the railcar circulated water through the pipes based upon how fast the train was going. This created a self-sustaining heating system that did not require any additional power sources to operate.

Although Wilcox's design represented a major advance in developing practical methods for providing heat to railroad passenger areas, one major flaw existed. There was no means of controlling the amount of heat produced by the engine. Thus, if you put the heater on low when you got onto your train, after several hours you may be sitting next to someone who is sweating profusely.

=== Patents and other inventions ===
In 1893, she successfully patented her design under her own name, as the Married Women's Property Acts—including Illinois's 1861 statute—had by then expanded women's rights to own intellectual property independently of their husbands. Her previous inventions had been filed under her husband's name due to legal restrictions that limited married women's ability to hold property and patents. She also developed several stoves and housing appliances, including a combined cooking and hot-water-heating stove designed to save fuel by efficiently utilizing the wasted heat of the stove. One of her earlier patented ideas included the combination of a clothes and dishwasher machine.

Between 1890 and 1909, Wilcox secured patents across a range of domestic and mechanical applications, including a combined clothes and dishwashing machine in 1890 (US426486A), a combined cooking and hot-water-heating stove in 1892 (US482772A), a dough mixer in 1893 (US509987A), a spring-loaded exercise swing in 1906 (US822329A), a bake pan in 1907 (US868312A), and a hot-water house heater in 1909 (US941597A). These patents demonstrated her versatility as an inventor across a range of mechanical and domestic applications.

Although these inventions were not commercially successful, they demonstrated her innovative approach to solving everyday problems and her forward-thinking in appliance design. Her inventions were not widely adopted during her lifetime, in part due to safety concerns such as overheating and the slow pace of industrial acceptance. Wilcox's contributions have received limited historical recognition, though her work represented a significant achievement for women in engineering during the nineteenth century.

== Legacy and modern impact ==
Although the original intent for Wilcox’s car heating system was designed for railway cars, when the product was applied to automobiles, the innovation became revolutionary. The first closed cab passenger vehicles went to consumers about 1907, and the first rudimentary heaters appeared around 1917. However, it would take Ford adapting Wilcox’s engine heated air idea and putting it into the Ford Model A in 1929 before passengers could have a meaningful amount of heat in their vehicle cabs.

Nowadays, nearly all passenger vehicles operating today operate with the exact same basic process invented by Wilcox. Hot coolant from the engine passes through a heater core, air blows past it, and the resulting warmed air is circulated to all parts of the cabin. This type of climate control system is used for automobiles, truck, bus, train, and airplane systems.

In addition to her car heater invention, Wilcox had also developed a multi-purpose stove which she displayed at the 1893 World's Columbian Exposition in Chicago. Many inventions made by women were showcased at this exposition. As part of the display, the Board of Lady Managers’ Patents Committee acknowledged her invention. Additionally, Inventor’s Digest has listed Margaret A. Wilcox as one of the top 10 female inventors of all time due to her 1893 automobile heater patent.

Wilcox died on March 30, 1912, in Los Angeles, California, decades before the full impact of her work would be realized in the automotive industry.

== Honors ==
In 2020, Inventor's Digest named Wilcox's patent for the car heater one of their top ten patents by women.
