= John Zane =

John Zane may refer to:

- John Peder Zane, American journalist
- John Maxcy Zane, American lawyer
