= Stephen Sheppard =

Stephen Sheppard may refer to:

- Stephen Lea Sheppard (born 1983), Canadian writer and former actor
- Stephen M. Sheppard (born 1963), law professor
