= Select Essays in Anglo-American Legal History =

1900s collection of essays

Select Essays in Anglo-American Legal History is a collection of 76 essays about the history of Anglo-American law. It was published, under the direction of a committee of the Association of American Law Schools, by Little, Brown and Company, in Boston, in three octavo volumes, from 1907 to 1909.

It is an "important publication" which is "collected with conspicuous taste and judgement".

The American Lawyer said "The wealth of material by law writers of eminence and deep research, now being gathered in these volumes, and heretofore scattered in comparatively inaccessible volumes of periodicals," possessed "a value for the professor, student, and practitioner which can hardly be overestimated."

== Volume 1 ==
=== The Development of Teutonic Law ===
This essay is by Edward Jenks. It is an extract from Law and Politics in the Middle Ages (1898).

=== The Centralization of Norman Justice under Henry II ===
This essay is by Alice Stopford. It is an extract from Henry the Second (Twelve English Statesmen) (1888).

=== The Five Ages of the Bench and Bar in England ===
This essay is by John Maxcy Zane. The first part was previously published in June 1907 in volume 2 of the Illinois Law Review, at page 1. The other four parts had not been previously published in print.

The Saturday Review said "The only hitherto unpublished essay is worthy of particular attention. In The Five Ages of the Bench and Bar in England Mr. Zane compresses into just under a hundred pages a better biographical history of the profession than might have been expected within the compass of an octavo volume. He deals with that personal element, the supreme importance of which is most apparent in a system so largely compounded of "judge-made law", developed in accordance with the principle—to quote the expression of Professor Bryce—that all law is a compromise between the past and the present, between tradition and convenience. It is difficult to conceive what might have been the development of our institutions had the English Bench departed in more than a very few isolated cases from the high traditions by which it has from the first been animated. We may remark in passing that Mr. Zane is perhaps a little too eager in his defence of the character of Jeffreys; his intellectual qualities have never lacked appreciation among those who take the trouble to read his judgments. The inclusion of such biographical matter as is contained in this essay, and of James Kent's delightful letter (reprinted from an American legal periodical) under the title of An American Law Student of a Hundred Years Ago, should give relief to those who concern themselves with the heavier matter with which the majority of the essays are concerned. Such elements serve, by the introduction of the personal element, to realise so far as is possible in dealing with legal history the truth of Carlyle's maxim that history is the essence of innumerable biographies."

Corbin said "These are entertaining popular lectures—perhaps not in a very appropriate setting here—a combination of biography, genealogy, and stories. They do not exhibit an altogether unbiased historical tone, at times showing an overreadiness either to condemn or to overpraise." The Political Science Quarterly said the essay is "long and very readable".

== Volume 2 ==
This volume includes "The Sources of English Law" by Heinrich Brunner.
