= Where to Find Your Law =

Book by Ernest Arthur Jelf

Where to Find Your Law is a book by Ernest Arthur Jelf, M.A. It is a bibliography of law.

The First Edition was published in 1897, the Second in 1900 and the Third in 1907.

In 1897, the Westminster Review said:

So vast is the body of English law that, as has been well said, the knowledge of even one of its branches requires the continuous study of a lifetime. To the general practitioner, then such specialisation is impossible, and the most that he can hope to do is to know where he may find the rule of law to fit the case presented to him. Where to Find Your Law, by Mr. E. A. Jelf, is a practical reference book for the general practitioner, giving him, under the accepted divisions of English law, the authorities contained in the statutes, reports of cases, and text-books upon each particular branch of the law. The present work, we are told, is based upon a series of articles which appeared in the Law Times from January 1895 to October 1896, and is intended as a complete guide to the books in which the law is to be found; but of course it will be of little use to the specialist, who should be already only too well acquainted with the books devoted to his subject.

In 1907, the Law Magazine and Review said of the third edition:

In his Preface the learned Author of this work states that he " has learnt that it has been in use in South Africa, Canada and New Zealand, and in other widely separated parts of the English-speaking world." It may interest him to know that both in the Supreme Court Library of Johannesburg and in the Supreme Court Library of Pretoria, in Great Britain's youngest Colony, a copy is kept, and is much appreciated by the users of both Libraries. When Where to Find Your Law first appeared there were many who said, "What a good idea, why did no one think of it before?" Well, no one did, and to Mr. Jelf belongs the kudos of originating a novel subject for one of the most useful works to be found in a lawyer's library. Many a weary lawyer must have blessed the learned Author for saving him an incalculable amount of trouble when searching for a treatise in which some particular point is dealt with. In the third edition the high standard of the first has been well maintained. It must be hard work to keep abreast of the multitude of treatises which come out every year on every conceivable branch of law. Be that as it may, we have here information concerning all the textbooks, statutes and reports of cases. He would be a daring man who attempted to preserve a tithe of this accumulation in his head; with Mr. Jelf to lead him, he can, however, place his finger on the right source for information in a very short time. After all, most lawyers do not want to burden their minds with more than an everyday fund of knowledge, but it is essential to be able to put one's finger on the law affecting any unusual point at a moment's notice. This is the practical utility of Mr. Jelf's book, and because he has fulfilled his task with ability, his book is so very popular with lawyers. The size and complexity of its contents, is an ever standing argument in favour of some sort of codification of our laws. Several branches have been codified; let us hope that the process will continue and be completed in due time. Until that much hoped-for epoch arrives, the book under review will continue to be in the future, as it has been in the past, a standard work for everyday use.

In 1914, Percy Winfield said that this book was a "valuable" guide "to the materials of English law".
