= Szladits' Bibliography on Foreign and Comparative Law =

Szladits' Bibliography on Foreign and Comparative Law is a bibliography of law. It was first compiled and edited by Charles Szladits and then edited by Vratislav Pechota. About one fifth of its entries are annotated. Pagel said it "can be helpful". Re called it "indispensable". Winterton said that it is "comprehensive" and "outstanding". Hoffman and Rumsey described it as "useful".
