= Where to Look for Your Law =

Where to Look for Your Law, commonly known as the Yellow Book, is a bibliography of law. It is "well known". It has been described as "valuable", as "an indispensable tool" and as "an old friend". By 1990, it was "very outdated".

The First Edition was published in January 1908, the Second in October 1912, the Third in October 1926, the Fourth in October 1929, the Fifth in October 1935, the Sixth in October 1938, the Seventh in March 1943, the Second Impression of that Edition in May 1943, the Eighth Edition in February 1944, the Ninth in November 1946, the Tenth in January 1948, the Eleventh in 1954, the Twelfth in 1957, the Thirteenth in 1960, and the Fourteenth in 1962.

The Seventh to Tenth Editions were by R Hilary Stevens. The Eleventh to Fourteenth Editions were by Charles William Ringrose, Librarian to the Honourable Society of Lincoln's Inn.
