= The Sources of English Law =

Essay by Heinrich Brunner

"The Sources of English Law" (as it is sometimes known) is an essay written by the German historian Heinrich Brunner and translated by others.

In 1909, it was described as a "valuable survey of the sources and literature of English law". In 1914, Winfield called it a "valuable" guide "to the materials of English law".

== Editions, reprints and translations ==
This essay was published under the title Ueberblick über die Geschichte der französischen, normannischen, und englischen Rechtsquellen in 1877 in the third edition of Encyclopädie der Rechtwissenschaft, by Franz von Holtzendorf, at pages 229 to 267, as Part II, section 4. It was reprinted in 1882, in the fourth edition of that work, at pages 277 to 317; and in 1890, in the fifth edition, at pages 303 to 347. It was omitted from the sixth edition published in 1904.

It was translated into English by W Hastie and published under the title The Sources of the Law of England at Edinburgh in 1888. This publication does not disclose the edition from which it is translated.

A translation by Ernst Freund was published under the title The Sources of English Law in volume 2 of Select Essays in Anglo-American Legal History, at pages 7 to 52. The notes to this volume say that the version contained therein is "revised, enlarged and recast" by Brunning, who has omitted so much of the essay as relates to Norman and French sources. This version was published, "with some further revision", in its German dress, under the title Geschichte der Englischen Rechtsquellen im Grundiss in Leipzig in 1909 by Duncker and Humblot. This version has been described as follows:

It is indispensable to any student of English history who wishes to make himself rapidly acquainted with the latest expert estimate of the varied materials with which the legal historian has to deal. We find here, for instance, the best succinct account of Dr. Liebermann's work on Anglo-Saxon law, with references to his numerous articles in legal and other periodicals. Another of Dr. Brunner's encyclopaedia articles, that on the 'Sources of Norman Law,' is usefully added as an appendix. The learned author does not leave much scope to the critic, but he takes, we think, rather too seriously Hoveden's loose description of Duke Henry as 'justiciar of England' in the last days of Stephen's reign.
