= Anglo-American Legal Bibliographies =

Anglo-American Legal Bibliographies: An Annotated Guide is a book written by William Lawrence Friend and published in 1944 by the United States Government Printing Office. It is a metabibliography which contains entries for 298 Anglo-American legal bibliographies.

Glanville Williams advised students, who want to conduct deeper research than an ordinary practitioner would, to look at this book.
