= John Rastell =

English printer, author, politician, and barrister (died 1536)

John Rastell (or Rastall) (c. 1475 – 1536) was an English printer, author, member of parliament, and barrister.

== Life ==
Born in Coventry, he is vaguely reported by Anthony à Wood to have been "educated for a time in grammaticals and philosophicals" at Oxford. He became a member of Middle Temple, and practised as a barrister, but established a printing business in London c.1512. He also devised pageantries for the king. Amongst works he published, in a preface to Liber assisarum et placitorum corone (1514?) he announced the forthcoming publication of Sir Anthony Fitzherbert's Abbreviamentum librorum legum Anglorum, dated 1516. Among the works issued from the "sygne of the meremayd at Powlysgate," where he lived and worked from 1520 onwards, are The Mery Gestys of the Wydow Edyth (1525), and A Dyaloge of Syr Thomas More (1529). The last of his dated publications was Fabyl's Ghoste (1533), a poem. In 1529 he became M.P. (Member of Parliament) for Dunheved, Cornwall

In 1530 he wrote, in defence of the Catholic doctrine of Purgatory, A New Boke of Purgatory (1530), dialogues on the subject between "Comyngs and Almayn a Christen man, and one Gyngemyn a Turke." This was answered by John Frith in A Disputacion of Purgatorie. Rastell replied with an Apology against John Fryth, also answered by the latter. Rastell had married Elizabeth, sister of Sir Thomas More, with whose Catholic theology and political views he was initially in sympathy. More had begun the controversy with John Frith, and Rastell joined him in attacking the Protestant writer, who, says John Foxe (Actes and Monuments, ed. G Townsend, vol. v. p. 9), did so "overthrow and confound" his adversaries that he converted Rastell to his side.

Separated from his Catholic friends, Rastell does not seem to have been fully trusted by the opposite party, for in a letter to Thomas Cromwell, written probably in 1536, he says that he had spent his time in upholding the king's cause and opposing the pope, with the result that he had lost both his printing business and his legal practice, and was reduced to poverty. He was imprisoned in 1536, perhaps because he had written against the payment of tithes. He probably died in prison, and his will, of which Henry VIII had originally been appointed an executor, was proved on 18 July 1536. He left two sons: William Rastell and John Rastell the Younger, the latter of whom accompanied Richard Hore on his ill-fated expedition. The Jesuit, John Rastell (1532-77), who has been frequently confounded with him, was no relation.

== Works ==
=== The Pastyme of People (1529) ===
Rastell's best-known work is The Pastyme of People, the Chronycles of dyvers Realmys and most specially of the Realme of England (1529), a chronicle dealing with English history from the earliest times to the reign of Richard III, edited by Thomas Frognall Dibdin in 1811.

=== Legal works: Abbreviacion (1519) and Expositiones (1527) ===
His best known legal works are The Abbreviacion of Statutis (1519) and Expositiones terminorum legum Angliae (1527). The original Law French edition of the Expositiones did not appear again. However, in 1567 it was translated into English as Expositions of the terms of the laws of England. Many editions then followed over the next 150 years. After 1620, the Expositions was known as Les Termes de la Ley.

=== The Four Elements (circa 1519) ===
Rastell was also the author of a morality play, A new Interlude and a Mery of the Elements, or The Four Elements written about 1519, which is no doubt the "large and ingenious comedy" attributed to him by Wood.

The unique copy in the British Library is incomplete, and contains neither the date nor the name of the author, identified with John Rastell on the authority of John Bale, who catalogued Natura Naturata among his works, adding a Latin version of the first line of the piece. This interlude was printed in William Carew Hazlitt's edition of Dodsley's Old English Plays, by James Orchard Halliwell-Phillipps for the Percy Soc. (Early English Poetry, vol. 22, 1848), and by Julius Fischer. See also an article by Henry R. Plomer, who unearthed in the Record Office an account of a lawsuit (1534–35) in connection with Rastell's premises at the "Mermaid". For the books issued from his press see a catalogue by Robert Proctor, in Handlists of English Printers (Bibliographical Soc., 1896).

== Printer of music ==
He was also the first English printer of polyphonic music, which he began issuing in the 1520s. The practice of printing music from a single impression i.e. using pieces of type that print staves, notes and text together, was apparently first practiced by Rastell in London about 1520. Two different broadside songsheets printed by him survive, dated to about 1523; two survivals of ephemeral unbound works from such an early date suggest that he may have printed a considerable amount of music. The texts are in English, suggesting they were for the local market, not export. After his death, the musical type were acquired by John Gough.
