= Stephen M. Sheppard =

American historian

Stephen M. Sheppard (born 1963) is an American professor of law, legal historian, and editor. He is Dean Emeritus, and Charles E. Cantú Distinguished Professor of Law Emeritus at St. Mary's University School of Law, in San Antonio, Texas.

== Education ==
Sheppard received a B.A. in Political Science from the University of Southern Mississippi followed by a J.D., L.L.M., and his doctorate, J.S.D., from Columbia University. He has also received a post-J.D. certificate in International Law from Columbia University and was made Master of Letters by Oxford University.

== Scholarship ==
Sheppard is a legal historian, with a focus on the development of the common law and of legal institutions, particularly legal education in the United States. His work in the law has been cited by courts including the Utah Supreme Court, (in State v. Reyes, 116 P.3d 305 (2005)) which changed the burden of proof for felonies in Utah citing Sheppard's law review article, "The Metamorphoses of Reasonable Doubt: How Changes in the Burden of Proof Have Weakened the Presumption of Innocence". Dr. Sheppard is credited as the General Editor of a revised edition of the American legal dictionary by John Bouvier, The Wolters Kluwer Bouvier Law Dictionary. As an editor, he has prepared new editions of several law books, including the Opera Omnia of John Selden, Bramble Bush by Karl Llewellyn, and Introduction to the Legal System of the United States by E. Allan Farnsworth.

== Professional career ==
A member of the State Bar of Texas and the Mississippi Bar, Sheppard is admitted to practice before the U.S. Supreme Court and the U.S. Tax Court.

Until 2014, he was the William H. Enfield Distinguished Professor of Law at the University of Arkansas School of Law, where he was also the Associate Dean for Research and Faculty Development.

== Sexual Assault Case ==
On April 12, 2023, Texas Rangers and University police searched Sheppard's office on the campus of St. Mary's University School of Law for evidence in the sexual assault case filed by a student against Sheppard. Sheppard was barred from campus and placed on administrative leave while the investigation took place. After the investigation, Sheppard was reinstated.

== Awards ==
- Member of the American Law Institute
- Member of the Royal Historical Society

== Publications ==
- The Selected Writings and Speeches of Sir Edward Coke, Liberty Fund, 2003, ISBN 978-0-86597-316-9
- with George P. Fletcher, American Law in a Global Context: The Basics Oxford University Press, 2005, ISBN 978-0-19516-723-8
- The History of Legal Education in the United States: Commentaries and Primary Sources Salem Press, 2005, ISBN 978-1-58477-690-1
- I Do Solemnly Swear: The Moral Obligations of Legal Officials Cambridge University Press, 2009, ISBN 978-0-52173-508-7
- General Editor, The Wolters Kluwer Bouvier Law Dictionary: Compact Edition, Kluwer, 2011, ISBN 978-0-73556-852-5
- An Introduction to the Legal System of the United States, Fourth Edition, Oxford University Press, 2010, ISBN 978-0-19973-310-1
