= Lawyers' Law Books =

First edition

Lawyers Law Books: A Practical Index to Legal Literature is a bibliography of law. The First Edition was by John Rees and Donald Raistrick. The Second and Third were by the latter author alone.

== First Edition ==
The First Cumulative Supplement to this Edition was published in 1979.

== Second Edition ==
Hines said this book might be the "most noteworthy" of the more recent general legal bibliographies. McVeigh praised it for its succinctness and called it "the best starting point".

== Third Edition ==
The preface to this edition is dated August 1996. This Edition does not include books published before 1980 unless the author considered them to be "useful". Finch and Fafinski said that this book is "extremely useful". Holborn called it "excellent".
