= Encyclopaedia of the Laws of England =

Encyclopedia of English law

Encyclopaedia of the Laws of England is an encyclopedia of English law edited by Alexander Wood Renton and (captain) Maxwell Alexander Robertson (sometimes called "Max Robertson"). The first edition was published as Encyclopaedia of the Laws of England, Being a New Abridgment, in thirteen volumes (including a supplement edited by A W Donald), from 1897 to 1903. The second edition was published as Encyclopaedia of the Laws of England, with Forms and Precedents, in seventeen volumes (including two supplementary volumes), from 1906 to 1919. Volumes one to five of the third edition, revised, edited by Ernest Arthur Jelf, were published from 1938 to 1940.

The encyclopedia has a foreword by Frederick Pollock.

Other contributors included Challis, Holland, Ilbert, Maitland, Blake Odgers, Phillimore, and "many other recognized authorities on the subjects with which they deal". "A high standard of execution is maintained throughout". Holland's account of the Civil Law has been called "admirable" and Ilbert's article on Codification has been called "brightly written" and said to do "full justice to Bentham's work as a law reformer". Jelf said the paper on "Customs", contributed to volume 4 by C J Follett was "excellent".

== First Edition ==
In 1898, the Law Quarterly Review said of volume 4 of the First Edition:

We venture to observe that, while the principal articles are well and often extremely well done, the others do not always achieve that precision and completeness which are the crown of virtue to a great book of reference. A little more space and trouble might be given to the minor and more obscure headings, at the cost, if need be, of giving a little less to those on which good text-books are available and for which, therefore, practitioners are less likely to rely on the Encyclopaedia. Thus in the article 'Debt, Action of' an awkwardly placed sentence all but commits the learned writer (who doubtless knows better) to representing the common 'indebitatus' counts in assumpsit as belonging to the action of debt; and a novice might be easily misled. And we must except, though it is really of no importance, to the medieval history which treats that eccentric book the Mirror as a fair sample of the older law books, and the modern history which supposes Macaulay's draft of the Indian Penal Code to have been later than the reports of the Criminal Law Commissioners ('Criminal Law,' pp. 37, 38).

== Second Edition ==
In 1906, the Law Quarterly Review said of volume 1 of the Second Edition:

We cannot now do more than note the appearance of the first volume of the new edition of this excellent work. All the articles have been revised and many of them enlarged. As an instance of the considerable additions made, we may mention the article on 'Appeals.' In the first edition only fifteen pages were allotted to this subject. Mr. Charles Burney's article in the present edition occupies nearly fifty pages. An especial feature of this issue is the addition of forms to many of the articles. Those in the present volume (e. g. Abstract of Title, Advowson, Allotments, Arbitration, Attestation, &c.) look eminently practical and useful, and should in most cases be sufficient for the ordinary needs of the practitioner without the necessity of consulting other works.
