= Law Books in Print =

Legal bibliography

Law Books in Print is a descriptive legal bibliography. It was published by Glanville Press. Marke, Sloan and Ryan said it is "an excellent source". S. Houston Lay said that a copy should be in the possession of all substantial law libraries. Law Books in Print is the primary series for the determination of prices and current editions. It is updated by Law Books Published.
