= David Hoffman (jurist) =

American legal scholar

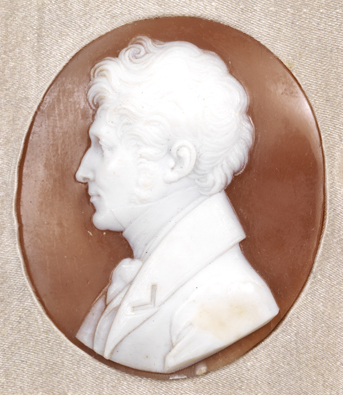
Cameo of David Hoffman, c. 1835

David Hoffman (December 24, 1784 – November 11, 1854) was an American legal scholar. He taught law at the University of Maryland from 1814 to 1843. Hoffman wrote Hoffman's Course of Legal Study, an influential early legal textbook.

Hoffman was born in Baltimore on December 24, 1784, the youngest of eight brothers, to Dorothea Stierlin Lloyd and Peter Hoffman. His father, a businessman, had emigrated from Germany to Maryland. He attended St. John's College, but left in 1802 without receiving a degree. In 1816, he married Mary McKean.

Hoffman left his professorship at the University of Maryland in 1836 to study in Europe. He received doctorates in law from the University of Maryland and the University of Oxford, and a doctorate of both laws from the University of Göttingen. He practiced law in Philadelphia from the late 1830s to 1847, when he left again for Europe.

He died in New York City on November 11, 1854.

Hoffman was influenced by the political philosopher James Harrington. He thought it was important for American lawyers to be familiar with Roman law and civil law.

== Works ==
- A Course of Legal Study (1817)
- Legal Outlines. John Miller; Joseph Neal. 1836.
- Miscellaneous Thoughts on Men, Manners, and Things, by Anthony Grumbler. Plaskitt & Cugle. 1837.
- Viator, or a Peep in My Note-book. Plaskitt & Cugle. 1841.
- Legal Hints (1846)
- Chronicles Selected from the Originals of Cartaphilus, the Wandering Jew. Thomas Bosworth. 1853. (2 volumes, 1853–55)

== Sources ==
- Ariens, Michael (2014). "Lost and Found: David Hoffman and the History of American Legal Ethics" (PDF). Arkansas Law Review. 67: 571–624.
- Bloomfield, Maxwell (1979). "David Hoffman and the Shaping of a Republican Legal Culture". Maryland Law Review. 38 (4): 673–688 – via HeinOnline.
- Shaffer, Thomas L. (1982). "David Hoffman's Law School Lectures, 1822–1833". Journal of Legal Education. 32 (1): 127–138. ISSN 0022-2208. JSTOR 42898017.
