= Bacon's Abridgement =

English law book

A New Abridgment of the Law is a legal book compiled by Mathew Bacon. The first edition dates from 1736, and the most recent English edition in 1832.

The work is an abridgement of English common law which was widely used in the United States during the early- and mid-19th century. The work was compiled by Bacon, assembled mainly from the dissertations and treatises of Baron Gilbert, either quoting them in full or providing extracts thereof. Bacon died before completing the abridgement, and the collection was completed by Sergeant Sayer and Owen Ruffhead.

== See also ==
- Anthony Fitzherbert
- Books of authority
- D'Anvers' Abridgment
- Rolle's Abridgment
- Viner's Abridgment
