= Blackacre Nature Preserve and Historic Homestead =

- Tyler Settlement Rural Historic District
- U.S. National Register of Historic Places
- U.S. Historic district
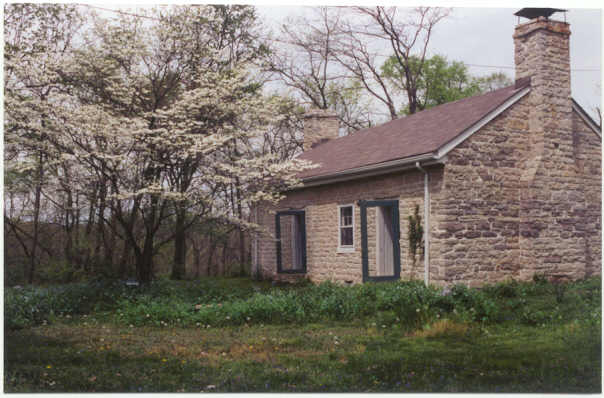
- 18th Century Historic Stone Cottage

- Location within Kentucky Location within the United States
- Location: Roughly bounded by the Southern railroad line, Taylorsville Rd., and Jeffersontown city limits, near Jeffersontown, Kentucky but within Louisville
- Coordinates: 38°11′35″N 85°32′09″W
- Area: 601.5 acres (2.434 km^{2})
- Built: 1790
- Architectural style: Greek Revival, Vernacular Greek Revival
- MPS: Jefferson County MRA
- NRHP reference No.: 86001045
- Added to NRHP: May 1, 1986

Blackacre State Nature Preserve is a 271-acre (110 ha) nature preserve and historic homestead in Louisville, Kentucky. The preserve features rolling fields, streams, forests, and a homestead dating back to the 18th century. For visitors, the preserve features several farm animals including horses, goats, and cows, hiking trails, and a visitor center in the 1844-built Presley Tyler home. Since 1981, it has been used by the Jefferson County Public Schools as the site of a continuing environmental education program. About 10,000 students visit the outdoor classroom each year.

The preserve was created in 1979 when the land was given to the Office of Kentucky Nature Preserves by Judge Macauley and Mrs. Emilie Smith creating the first nature preserve in the Commonwealth's system. The Blackacre Conservancy, founded in 1983, operates the historic homestead and conducts cultural and historical programs while the Office retains ownership of the preserve and manages its natural resources.

Blackacre is part of the old Moses Tyler farm, several original farm buildings remain, including the 1844 Presley Tyler home, an Appalachian-style barn and a reconstructed stone spring house. The entire 600-acre (240 ha) settlement has been named a national historic rural settlement. It was listed on the National Register of Historic Places as Tyler Settlement Rural Historic District in 1986.

The name Blackacre is used as a generic name in legal contexts, particularly in law school and on bar exams, to refer to a parcel of land. The Smith family gave the land the name Blackacre; previously it was known as Land O'Skye.

== History ==
Blackacre was first settled by the Tyler Family, who arrived in Louisville in 1780. Edward Tyler II purchased a Treasury Warrant allowing him to lay claim to a parcel of land. Moses Tyler was transferred, a portion of that, the 220 acres (89 ha) that now compromise the majority of Blackacre. Later the land was given to Moses's son, Presley. Moses Tyler had already built a barn, a stone cottage and springhouse, but Presley decided to add an impressive two-story farmhouse. In 1884 Presley sold the property to the Kroeger family, who owned it until 1902. After a series of other owners, the property was bought by the Smith family in 1950. In 1979 Emilie and Macauley Smith, seeing the immense beauty and value of the land, donated it to the Commonwealth of Kentucky, allowing Blackacre to become the first State Nature Preserve of Kentucky.

=== Slavery ===
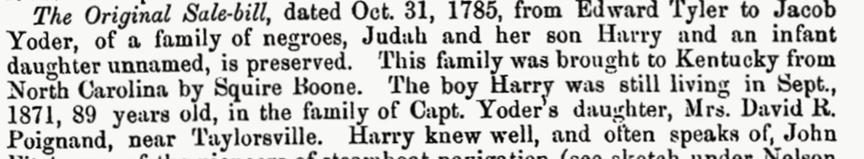
Evidence of Edward Tyler engaging in the slave trade in Kentucky

Born into a fourth-generation tobacco planting family, evidence shows that Edward Tyler II sold human chattel in both Maryland and Kentucky.

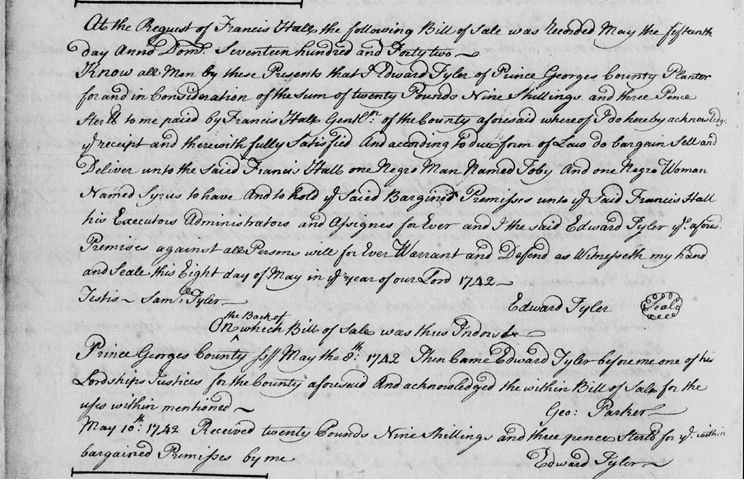
Evidence of Edward Tyler II engaging in the slave trade in Maryland.

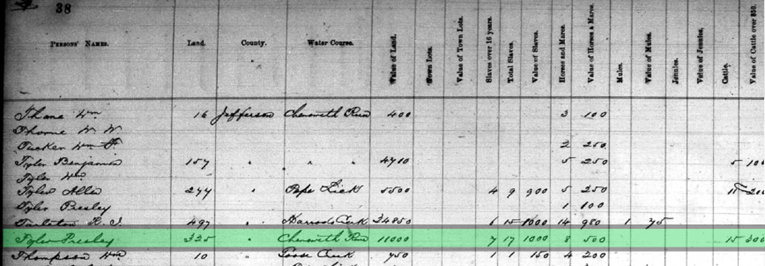
A copy of Presley Tyler's 1865 tax record (with green highlight) showing his enslavement of 17 individuals.

Presley Tyler's 1865 tax records showing he enslaved 17 individuals. Only 7 of them were above the age of 16.

==== Known enslaved individuals associated with Blackacre ====
Numerous enslaved individuals are associated with or most likely lived on the site now known as Blackacre. These include:

- Judah, Harry, and unnamed infant daughter. On October 31, 1785, records state that Edward Tyler II sold to Jacob Yoder "a family of negroes, Judah and her son Harry and an infant daughter, unnamed... This family was brought to Kentucky from North Carolina by Squire Boone." Whether these individuals lived on the Blackacre site is unclear.
- Elliott. Moses Tyler's (son of Edward Tyler II) estate inventory identifies a "negro man named Elliott", valued at $500.
- Ben. Moses Tyler's will, dated September 11, 1830, states that he leaves a "certain negro man slave for life named Ben" to his son, Presley Tyler.

== Buildings ==
The barn is one of the three original Blackacre buildings. Built in 1790, the double-crib Appalachian barn was made out of large poplar boards harvested from the Blackacre property. Today the barn displays the pre-industrial farm tools that would have been used at Blackacre.

The stone cottage is the second original 1790 building.

The springhouse is the last of the original buildings. Springhouses acted as a refrigeration unit. Perishable food that could not be salted or smoked would be stored. A second floor of the spring was built to allow residents to cool off on hot days. The spring that lies next to the springhouse is man-made.

The farmhouse was built in 1844. Architecturally, it displays the influence of Greek-revival design. The farmhouse now holds the Blackacre's Visitors' Center.

== Gallery ==
18th Century Spring house show during the wintertime

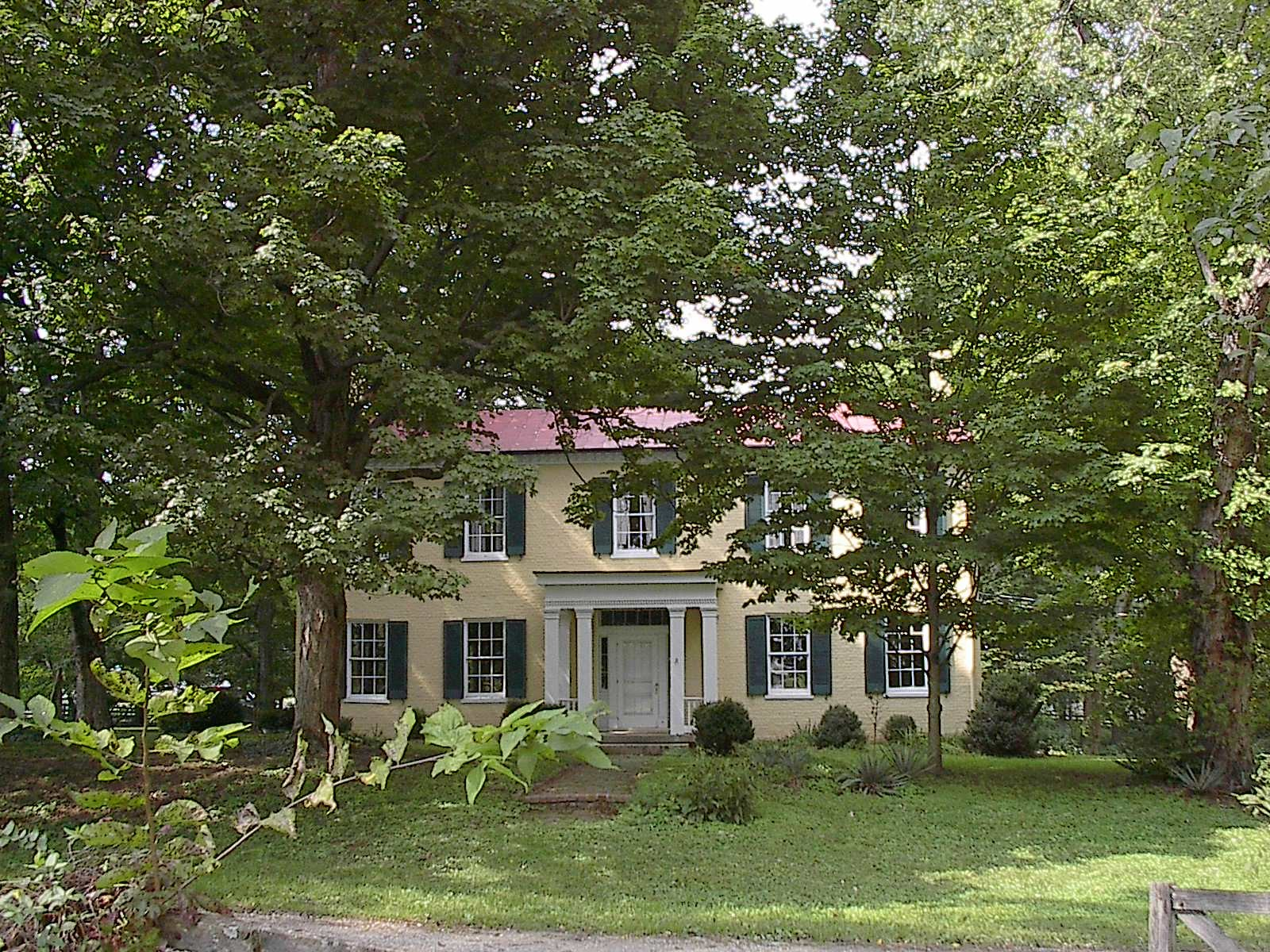
19th Century Presley Tyler Farmhouse and Historic Homestead

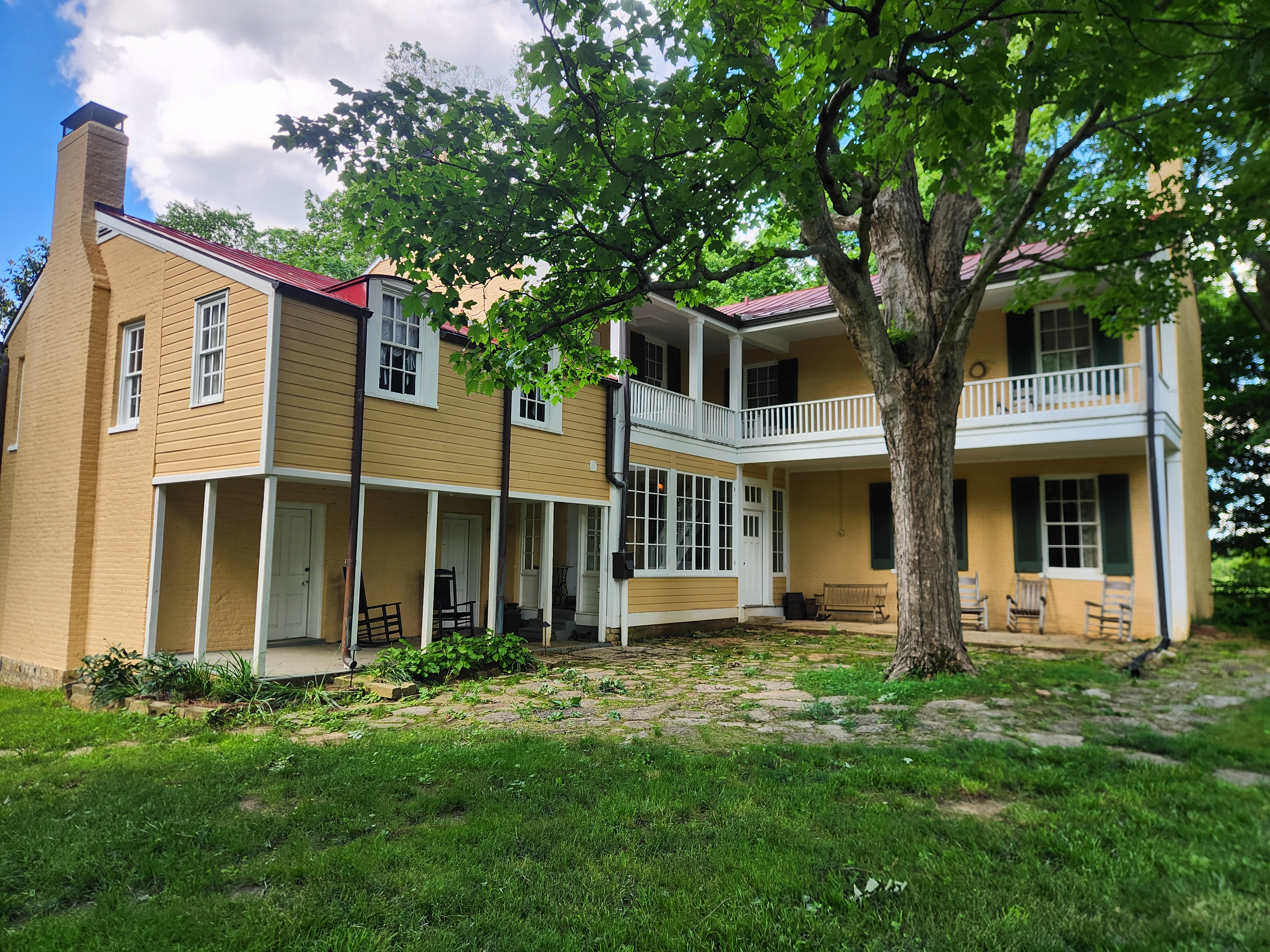
BlackAcre Tyler House Rear View

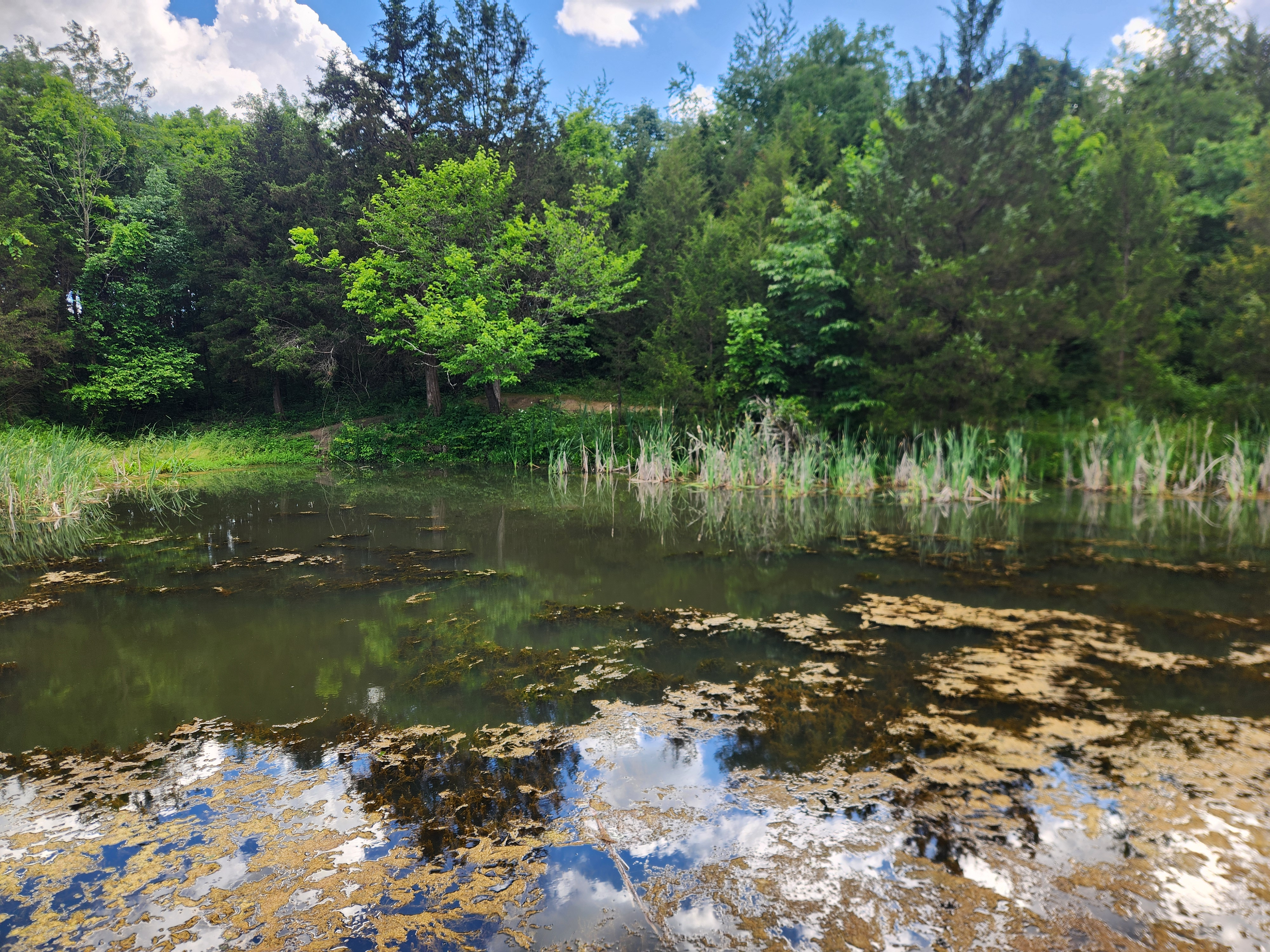
Blackacre Dragonfly pond

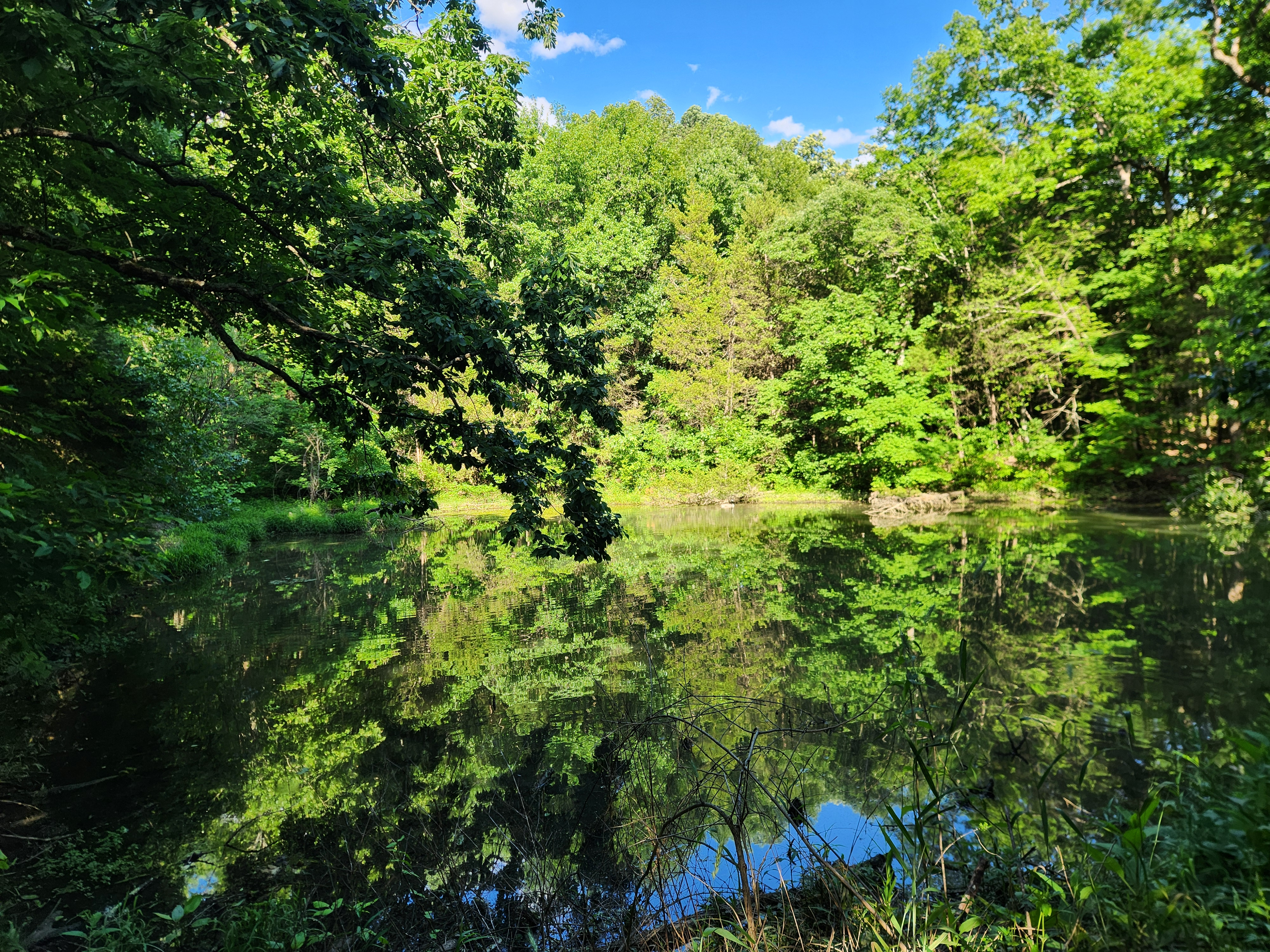
Blackacre Jackson pond

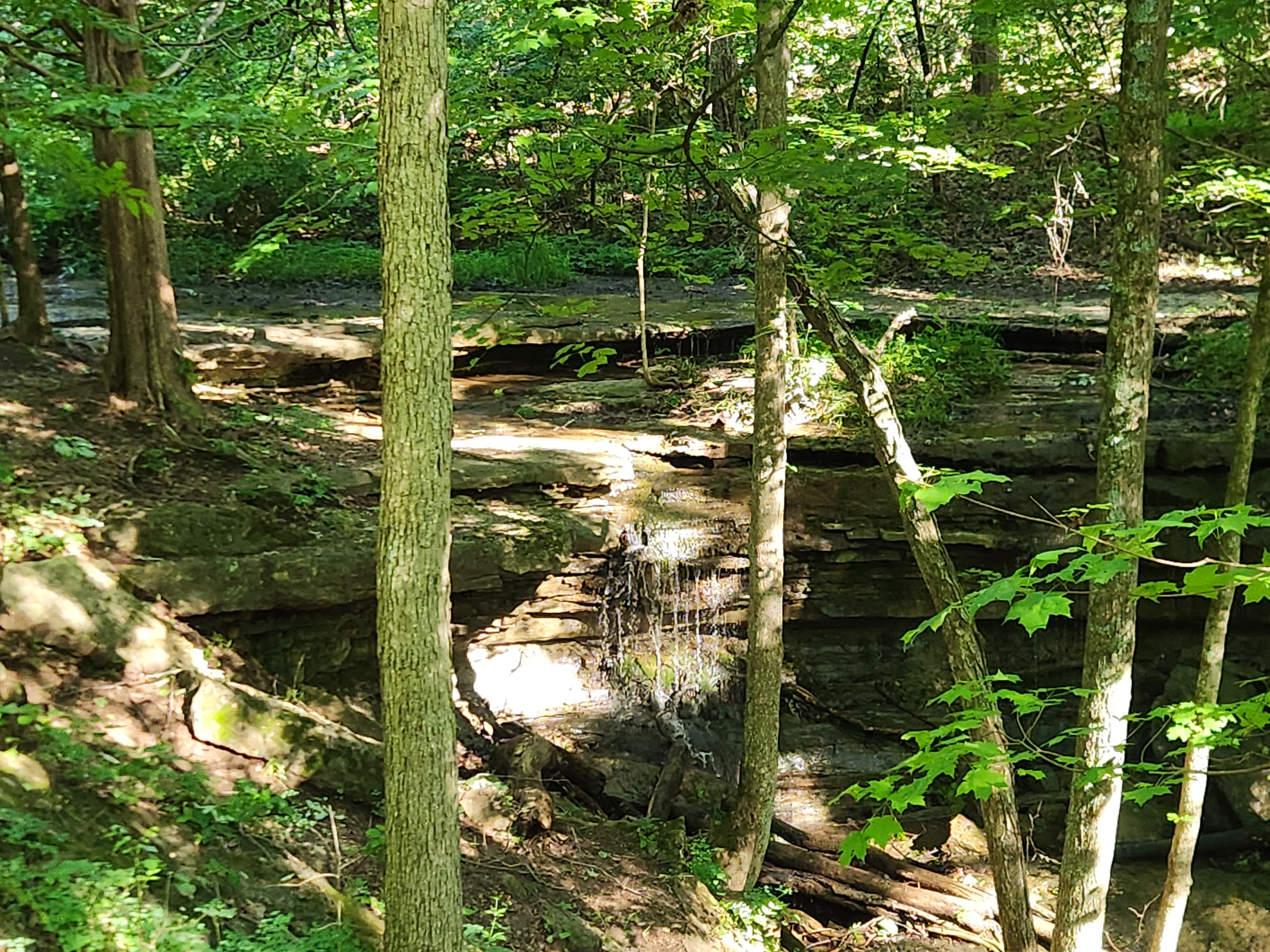
Waterfall at Blackacre Nature Preserve

Redbuds

== See also ==
- List of attractions and events in the Louisville metropolitan area
- National Register of Historic Places listings in Jefferson County, Kentucky
