= Ernst Freund =

American legal writer (1864–1932)

Ernst Freund (January 30, 1864, in New York City – October 20, 1932, in Chicago, Illinois) was a noted American legal scholar. He received a Dr. Jur. from the University of Heidelberg (1884) and a Ph.D. in political science from Columbia University (1897). He was professor of political science at the University of Chicago (1894–1902) and then professor of law at Chicago (1903–1932), serving as the John P. Wilson Professor of Law (1929–1932). Freund was principally responsible for the development of administrative law in the United States during the early twentieth century. He was one of the organizers of the Immigrants' Protective League (1908). The University of Chicago Law School has established the Ernst Freund Distinguished Service Professorship of Law and Ethics in his honor, a seat currently held by philosopher Martha Nussbaum. U.S. Supreme Court justice Felix Frankfurter described Freund as "one of the most distinguished of all legal scholars in the whole history of the legal professoriate".

== Works ==
- (1897) The legal nature of corporations. University of Chicago Press.
- (1903) Empire and sovereignty. University of Chicago Press.
- (1904) Jurisprudence and legislation.
- (1904) The Police Power: Public Policy and Constitutional Rights. University of Chicago Press.
- (1908) (with Heinrich Brunner) The Sources of English Law. Little, Brown.
- (1911) Cases on administrative law selected from decisions of English and American courts. American casebook series.
- (1914) The problem of adequate legislative powers under state constitutions. Academy of Political Science.
- (1917) Standards of American Legislation. University of Chicago Press.
- (1919) Illegitimacy laws of the United States and certain foreign countries. Govt. Print. Off.
- (1922) (with Maurice Taylor Van Hecke) The teaching of statute law. University of North Carolina Press.
- (1923) (with Robert Virgil Fletcher, Joseph Edward Davies Cuthbert Winfred Pound, John Albert Kurtz, and Charles Nagel) The growth of American administrative law. Thomas Law Book Co.
- (1928) Administrative powers over persons and property; a comparative survey. University of Chicago Press.
- (1932) Legislative Regulation: A Study of the Ways and Means of Written Law. The Commonwealth Fund, New York.
