= Rolle's Abridgment =

Law book written in Law French by Henry Rolle (1589–1656)

Un Abridgment des plusiers Cases et Resolutions del Common Ley, Alphabeticalment Digest desouth severall Titles (called Rolle's Abridgment, abbreviated Roll. Abr.) is an English law book written in Law French by Henry Rolle (1589–1656). The most recent edition was published in 1668, with an English-language preface.

Marvin's Legal Bibliography states:

C. J. Rolle's Abridgment was published under the inspection of Lord Hale who contributed an excellent Preface in English. Says Lord Hale, "I must deal plainly with the reader, and tell him, that though this book is off excellent use and worth, yet it comes far short of the abilities and worth of him that compiled it, and, therefore, is an unequal monument of him. I. The materials of this Treatise were not his own, but in a great measure collected out of the books and reports. II. It was only intended for private use, and never intended for public view. It is a posthumous work, which never underwent the last hand or pencil of the judicious author, and such works, though, when published, they may advantage others, yet they rarely come out to the due advantage of the author." It's superiority to the elder Abridgments consists in a more scientific arrangement of the materials, and a greater sub-division of the general heads. The obsolete titles of the law are omitted, and it contains a great number of Cases adjudged by the author, while Chief Justice of the King's Bench, as well as Cases from the Parliament rolls, and other sources, no where else to be found in print. "In point of method, succinctness, legal precision, and in many other respects, it is fit to be proposed as an example for other Abridgments of the Law." When an opinion of Rolls was cited by Counsel, before Twisden, J., the Court remarked, "That was Rolle's opinion, it may be, when he was a student. You have in that work of his a common place which you stand to much upon. I value him where he reports judgements and resolutions. But, otherwise, it is nothing but a collection of Year-Books and little things noted when he made his Common Place books." Rolle's Abridgment, however, is frequently cited and relied upon as an authority, even by those who have never seen the volumes, through D'Anvers and Viner. 1 Bart. Conv. 69; 1 Mod. 273; 9 Price, 618; 23 N. A. Rev. 7; 4 T. R. 64; (5)205; 1 Kent, 509; Hale's Pref.; Co. Lit. 9, a; 10 Cl. & Fin. 852.
