= Hoffman's Course of Legal Study =

Nineteenth-century legal textbook

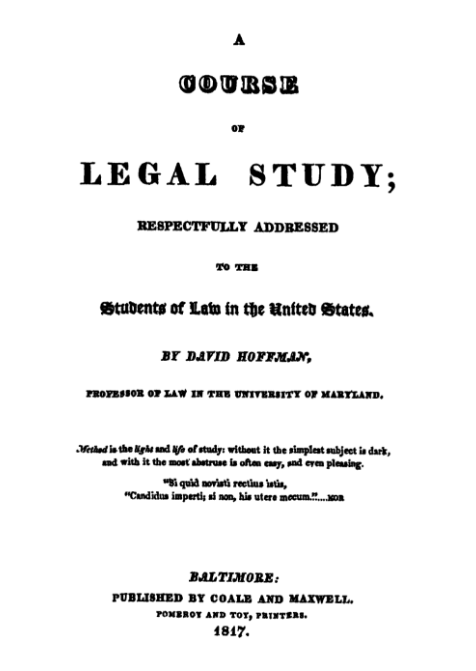
- Author: David Hoffman
- Original title: A Course of Legal Study; Respectfully Addressed to the Students of Law in the United States
- Language: English
- Subject: Law
- Publisher: Coale and Maxwell
- Publication date: 1817

Hoffman's Course of Legal Study is an 1817 legal textbook by American law professor David Hoffman that was influential in the development of America's first law school curricula. An early American law professor, Hoffman was largely forgotten for generations but has gained more attention since the 1970s and been called "the first of the systemic legal educators" and "the father of American legal ethics".

== History ==
Originally published in 1817 as A Course of Legal Study; Respectfully Addressed to the Students of Law in the United States, the book was more commonly referred to as "Hoffman's Course of Legal Study". Author David Hoffman released the book when there were 40 lawyers practicing in Baltimore and shortly after founding the University of Maryland School of Law in 1816. He republished the book in 1836 as A Course of Legal Study, Addressed to Students and the Profession Generally, around the time he was losing interest in his law school and legal practice.

The book included an extensive reading list and a guide for producing one's own series of notebooks to use while reading law. Hoffman designed the course to require between five and seven years to complete, but Supreme Court Associate Justice Joseph Story believed it should take at least seven. Hoffman's Course was influential in the development of America's first law school curricula and Hoffman has been called "the first of the systemic legal educators" and "the father of American legal ethics".

Hoffman was left out of The Bench and Bar of Maryland: A History 1634 to 1901 (1901), but his approach to legal ethics gained renewed attention in the 1970s after the Watergate scandal. The "moral crisis" that President Nixon's lawyers had "blindly followed the demands of their client" was compared to Hoffman's conclusion that "a lawyer's duty to a client was limited by his duties to society".

== Reception ==
The same year it was first published, Joseph Story recommended Hoffman's Course of Legal Study in the North American Review, and said of Hoffman that "the writers whom he recommends are of the very best authority; and his own notes are composed in a tone of the most enlarged philosophy, and abound in just and discriminating criticism, and in precepts calculated to elevate the moral as well as intellectual character of the Profession". Writer and lawyer John Neal claimed to have completed Hoffman's course in only sixteen months and he gave a positive review to the book in 1819, saying that he was "a student who ... but for that work, might have continued a student for years, without any further understanding of the science". John Gage Marvin offered praise for the book in his 1847 legal bibliography, calling it "a work of peculiar excellence ... a priceless contribution to young men just starting upon the life-long study of the law" and "truly a bibliographical treasure, that none will do without who are in downright earnest in studying the law".
