= D'Anvers' Abridgment =

Law book

A General Abridgment of the Common Law, alphabetically digested under proper titles is a book by Knightley D'Anvers.

J. G. Marvin said:

This work, so far as it goes, is a translation of Rolle's Abridgment with the addition of Cases down to the time D'Anvers wrote. For want of a suitable publisher and patronage, the Abridgment was only completed to the Title Extinguishment. When published it received the imprimatur of all the judges except Lord Holt, who disapproved of the work; but subsequently, as Mr. Viner informs us, not only paid the author a personal complement from the bench, but left him an annuity of twenty pounds per annum for life. Mr. Viner also gives the following account of its progress through the press - "I have been credibly informed that his first volume continued seven years in the press. In eight years from publication thereof came out his second volume. The next was only a single Title, Error, and which was at first entitled a continuation of the second volume, though afterwards it was new named, and then called part of the third volume; but the Title Error did not make its appearance till fourteen years after the coming of the second volume. And after another ten years respite followed the remainder of the third volume; so that from the publication of volume first to that of volume third was not less than thirty-two years complete." Pref. to vol. 18 Viner's Abridg.
