= Ernest Arthur Jelf =

English jurist and author (1868–1949)

Sir Ernest Arthur Jelf MA (1868–1949), eldest son of Arthur Richard Jelf, was King's Remembrancer from 1937 to 1943. He was knighted in 1939.

== Works ==
He was author of:

- Corrupt and Illegal Practices: The Corrupt and Illegal Practices Prevention Act 1883. First Edition, 1894. Second Edition, 1895. The Corrupt and Illegal Practices Prevention Acts of 1883 and 1895. Third Edition, London, 1905.
- Where to Find Your Law. First Edition, 1897. Second Edition, 1900. Third Edition, 1907.
- The Principles of the Law of Evidence peculiar to Criminal Cases as altered by the Criminal Evidence Act, 1898. Second Edition, 1899.
- Fifteen Decisive Battles of the Law (1903)

He edited the third edition of Encyclopaedia of the Laws of England.

== Sources ==
- "Jelf, Sir Ernest Arthur", Who Was Who, A & C Black, an imprint of Bloomsbury Publishing plc, 1920–2015; online edition, Oxford University Press, April 2014.
- "Jelf, Sir Ernest Arthur". The International Who's Who. Europa Publications Limited. 7th Edition. 1942. p 446.
- Mark Meredith. "Jelf, Ernest Arthur". Who's Who in Literature. Literary Year Books Press. 1926. p 231.
- The Literary Year-Book. 1922. p 912
- Lawrence, Martell and Pine. "Jelf, Sir Ernest Arthur" in Who Was Who among English and European Authors, 1931-1949. Gale Research. 1978. Page 763.
- (1949) 99 The Law Journal 491 Google Books
- "Obituary" (1949) 208 The Law Times and Journal of Property 160 Google Books
- (1949) 68 Law Notes 225 Google Books
- The Solicitor (14 October 1949) Vols 16–17, p 217 Google Books
- "Obituary" (1949) 113 Justice of the Peace and Local Government Review 579 Google Books
- "Sir Ernest Jelf" (1949) 93 Solicitors Journal 567 Google Books
- (1949) 65 Scottish Law Review and Sheriff Court Reports 251 Google Books
- "The King's Remembrancer" in "The Law and the Lawyers" (1943) 196 The Law Times 127
- Howard and Crisp. Visitation of Ireland. 1904. Volume 4. Page 100.
- Marke, J J. A Catalogue of the Law Collection at New York University. New York University Law Library. 1953. Page 958.
- 19 Law Quarterly Review 551
- 57 Law Quarterly Review 552
