= Codognan =

Commune in Occitanie, France

- Commune
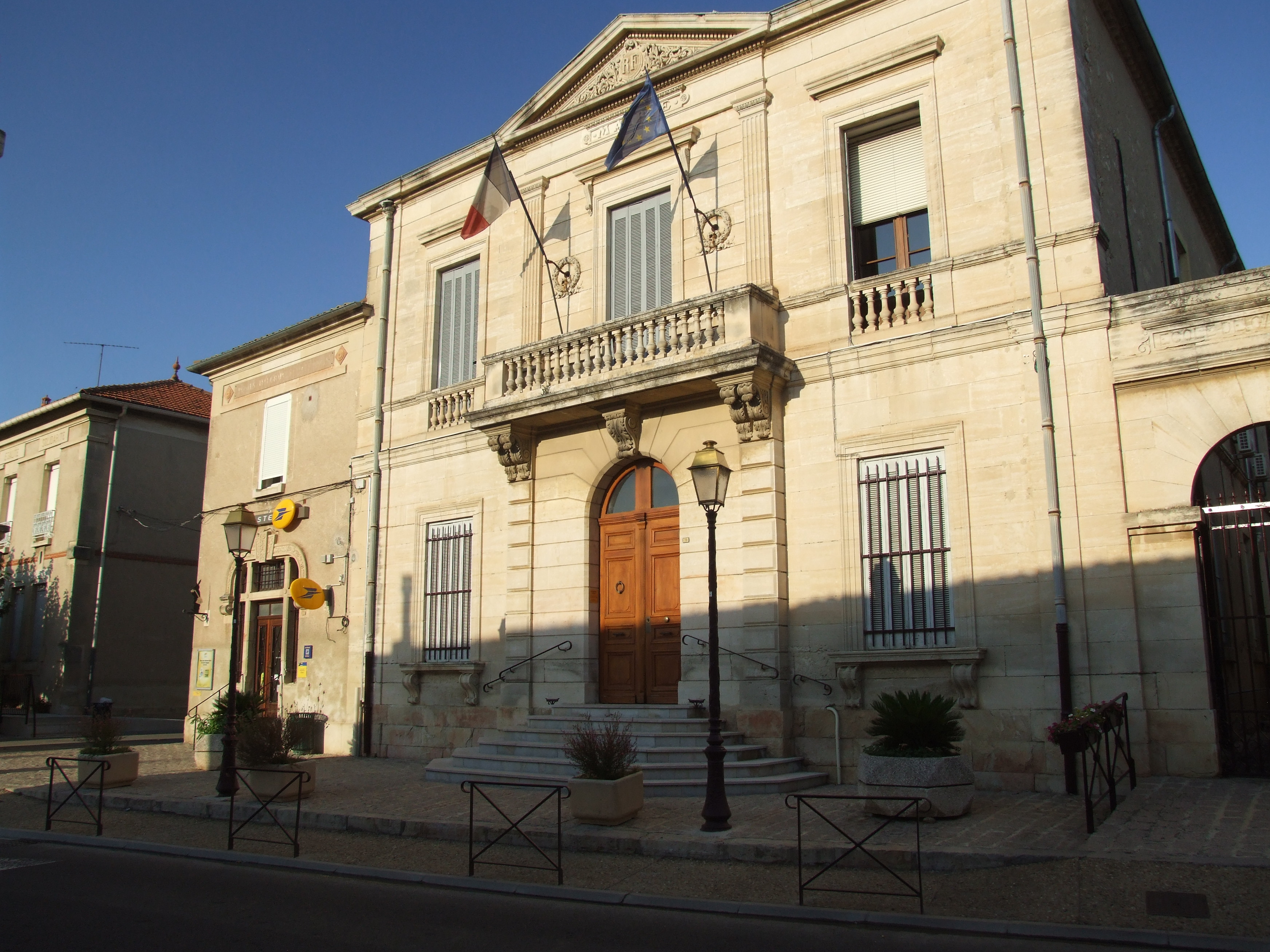
- Town hall
- Location of Codognan
- Location within France Location within Occitanie
- Coordinates: 43°43′57″N 4°13′14″E
- Country: France
- Region: Occitania
- Department: Gard
- Arrondissement: Nîmes
- Canton: Vauvert
- Intercommunality: Rhôny Vistre Vidourle

Government
  - Mayor (2020–2026): Philippe Gras
- Area^{1}: 4.65 km^{2} (1.80 sq mi)
- Elevation: 17 m (56 ft)
- Highest elevation: 21 m (69 ft)
- Lowest elevation: 10 m (33 ft)
- Population (2023): 2,529
  - Density: 544/km^{2} (1,410/sq mi)
- Time zone: UTC+01:00 (CET)
  - Summer (DST): UTC+02:00 (CEST)
- INSEE/Postal code: 30083 /30920
- ^{1} French Land Register data, which excludes lakes, ponds, glaciers > 1 km^{2} (0.386 sq mi or 247 acres) and river estuaries.

Codognan (French pronunciation: [kɔdɔɲɑ̃]; Occitan: Codonhan) is a commune in the Gard department in southern France.

== Population ==
Historical population
Year	Pop.	±% p.a.
1968	883	—
1975	1,052	+2.53%
1982	1,310	+3.18%
1990	1,760	+3.76%
1999	1,940	+1.09%
2007	2,512	+3.28%
2012	2,434	−0.63%
2017	2,423	−0.09%
2023	2,529	+0.72%
Source: INSEE

== See also ==
- Communes of the Gard department
