= The Chief Sources of English Legal History =

The Chief Sources of English Legal History is a book written by Percy Henry Winfield and published, with an introduction by Roscoe Pound, by Harvard University Press in 1925. It is "bright and lively", "eminently readable", "admirable", and of "great value and usefulness".

In 1926, the Solicitors Journal said "Dr. Winfield's lectures, here printed in book form, must of necessity be consulted by every teacher and student of English legal history for certainly the next generation, whilst the practical lawyer will find the book both interesting and useful. The plan of the work is an attempted valuation of the groups of authorities which the student of the history of English law must consult, together with an account of the more important individual sources in each group. Such is Dr. Winfield's own modest statement, but the reader is left in a state bordering on amazement. It seems almost impossible that any one man could have made himself so acquainted with the sources and their literature, not only by nature and by content, but also by value, and by the respective values of the different editions. Although the author hastens to disclaim "any pretence that this book is a bibliography", it need scarcely be added that for the careful reader who recognizes the limits which the author has set himself, the book will be widely used as a bibliography of the history of English law, and as such it is a perfect specimen of the bibliographer's art. Each "source" is examined as to its nature, value and place, before the reader is told of the various printed editions at his disposal, the commentaries thereon, and their value. The introductions to each chapter are all that could be desired, and of especial value to the researcher are the two chapters on The Statutes and on The Public Records in General. In addition to all this, however, the author prefaces the main section of his book with two chapters of a general nature on the necessary equipment of the student who would carry out research into English legal history, and on the existing bibliographical guides. It is also a pleasure to be provided with a really good index; and in this connection we would strongly support Dr. Winfield's plea for Indices Rerum in future printed sources of whatever nature (pp. 27-28). Dr. Winfield recognizes that probably his worst sins will be those of omission; but the omissions which we have noticed are almost all negligible. In the earlier sections on the equipment of the student, Capelli's Dizionario di Abbreviature and Giry's Manuel de Diplomatique might perhaps have been mentioned with advantage, whilst we believe that Brunner's Deutsche Rechtsgeschichte is a book which no student can afford to neglect. In the later sections it is possible that Miss A. J. Robertson's Laws of the Kings of England from Edmund to Henry I and Dr. W. C. Bolland's Manual of Year Book Studies came out after the book was in print, though it is difficult to see why Professor McIlwain's High Court of Parliament was not balanced by Professor Pollard's Evolution of Parliament (p. 101), and why the second volume of Petit Dutaillis, trans. W. T. Waugh, 1915, is omitted (p. 38). As it is, the book is a mine of information and a momument of learning, and Dr. Winfield has rendered a service which no serious student of his subject can lightly forget.

The Central Law Journal said "Both teachers and students in our law schools, as well as practising lawyers interested in more than the business side of their day’s work, will find Dr. Winfield’s book stimulating, interesting and reliable."
