= Odgers on Libel and Slander =

A Digest of the Law of Libel and Slander, also known as Odgers on Libel and Slander and Odgers on Libel, is a book on the law of defamation by William Blake Odgers.

According to the review of the third edition of this book in volume 16 of Law Quarterly Review, published in 1900, the Daily News called it "the best modern book on the law of libel", the Law Times called it "the most scientific of all our law books" and said that "in its new dress" it was "secure of an appreciative professional welcome", and the Law Journal said that "the general opinion of the profession" had "always accorded a high place to" this "learned work" and that the new edition could not "but enhance that opinion".

In 1907, Ernest Arthur Jelf called it "the most erudite work" on the subject of criminal libel, and said that it had "taken a secure place as the leading work" on the subjects of libel and slander.

In the humorous poem "The Hundred Best Books", Mostyn T. Piggott put this book third after the Bible and the Koran, though possibly because "Libel" rhymes with "Bible."
