= Termes de la Ley =

Expositiones terminorum legum Angliae ('Explanation of legal terms used in England') (1527) is a legal glossary compiled by John Rastell. Although the title is in Latin, the work was written in Law French. This Law French edition did not reappear. However, it was translated by his son, William Rastell, into English and published in 1563 as An Exposition of Certaine Difficult and Obscure Wordes and Termes of the Lawes of This Realme. Many editions followed through 1618. After 1620, the work was published and known as Les Termes de la Ley, and it was also often reprinted under that title.

This work and The Abbreviacion of Statutis (1519) are the best known of Rastell's legal writings. Lord Kenyon said that it is "a very excellent book".

Duke LJ. said that this book was "a work of very good authority and the application of the common law". He, and Atkin LJ, approved the definition of imprisonment contained in this book.

See also 4 Reeves 419 and 3 Dib Ames 90.

== See also ==
- Books of authority
