= A Legal Bibliography of the British Commonwealth of Nations =

A Legal Bibliography of the British Commonwealth of Nations, formerly Sweet & Maxwell's Legal Bibliography, is a bibliography of law published in London by Sweet & Maxwell.

== First Edition ==
The First Edition is called Sweet and Maxwell's Legal Bibliography. The first four volumes of that edition are also called Sweet and Maxwell's Complete Law Book Catalogue. Charles Szladits called this book "exhaustive" and "indispensable".

Volume 1 was compiled by W Harold Maxwell and published in 1925. Its subtitle is "English Law to 1650". It is "of much utility". Volumes 2 to 5 were compiled by Leslie F Maxwell. Volume 2 was published in 1931. Its title is "Bibliography of English Law, 1651 – 1800". Volume 3 was published in 1933. Its title is "Bibliography of English Law, 1801 – June 1932". Volume 4 was published in 1936. Its title is "Bibliography of Irish Law from Earliest Times to December 1935". Volume 5 was published in 1937. Its title is "Bibliography of Scottish Law from Earliest Times to November 1936, together with a list of Roman Law Books in the English Language". Volume 6 was published in 1938. Its title is "A Bibliography of the Laws of Australia, New Zealand, Fiji and the Western Pacific from Earliest Times to June 1938 with lists of Reports of Cases, Digests and Collections of Statutes and Rules". Two cumulative supplements were published from 1936 to 1939. These deal with the period down to December 1938. Another two cumulative supplements were published up to 1949. Volume 7 was compiled by Leslie F Maxwell and published in 1949. Its title is "A Bibliography of the law of British Colonies, Protectorates and Mandated Territories, being volume vii of Sweet & Maxwell's Legal Bibliography".

== Second Edition ==
The Second Edition is called A Legal Bibliography of the British Commonwealth of Nations.

This is one of the "more traditional bibliographic works". In this work, books are grouped by their subject and, within each subject, they are placed in alphabetical order according to the name of their author. Hines said this work is arguably the most complete list of legal publications, but contains "little" in the way of annotations and gives "scanty" bibliographic details for each book.

Volume 1 was compiled by W Harold Maxwell and Leslie F Maxwell and published in 1955. It deals with the law of England and Wales, the Channel Islands and the Isle of Man during the period down to the year 1800. It includes books published during that period. It also includes books dealing with period printed from 1480 to 1954. It is not complete. Volume 2 was compiled by John S James and Leslie F Maxwell and published in 1957. It deals with the law of England and Wales, the Channel Islands and the Isle of Man during the period from 1801 to 1954. Where separate editions of the same book were published respectively both before and after the end of the year 1800, or where a book deals with both periods, it is included in both volumes 1 and 2. Volume 3 was compiled by C R Brown, Percy A Maxwell and Leslie F Maxwell and was published in 1957. It deals with the law of Canada and the North American colonies and includes books published before 31 December 1956. Volumes 4 and 5 were compiled by W Harold Maxwell and Leslie F Maxwell and were published in 1957. Volume 4 deals with the law of Ireland. Volume 5 deals with the law of Scotland and includes a list of books on Roman law written in English. Volume 6 was published in 1958 and deals with the law of Australia, New Zealand and their dependencies. Part 5, which relates to New Zealand, the Cook Islands and Western Samoa was compiled by J O Wilson.
