= Gary Odgers =

Australian rules footballer

Personal information
- Full name: Gary W. Odgers
- Born: 15 December 1959 (age 66)
- Original team: Golden Point
- Height: 178 cm (5 ft 10 in)
- Weight: 75 kg (165 lb)

Playing career^{1}
Years	Club	Games (Goals)
1981–1987	St Kilda	91 (28)
- ^{1} Playing statistics correct to the end of 1987.

Gary Odgers (born 15 December 1959) is a former Australian rules footballer who played with St Kilda in the Victorian Football League (VFL).

== St Kilda career ==
Odgers came to the VFL from Ballarat club Golden Point and was used in a variety of roles by St Kilda, but mostly as a defender. He first broke into the side in 1981, playing five games that year. In 1982 he appeared in the first 17 rounds of the season, before losing his spot in the team with a shoulder injury. Over the next four seasons he was a regular fixture in the St Kilda team and probably had his best year in 1985 when he got eight Brownlow Medal votes, the only time he ever featured in the count. His 1985 season ended in style when in the final round against Footscray he kicked a 60-metre torpedo goal to seal the win, having earlier given his side the lead. It was St Kilda's only win at Moorabbin Oval that year. He was promoted to vice captain in 1986 and played 19 games that season. He only made two more appearances for St Kilda, which came in the opening two rounds of the 1987 season, but played in the St Kilda reserves grand final team that year, which lost to Carlton at the MCG.

== Ballarat Football League ==
Odgers went home to Ballarat in 1988 and was an assistant coach at Golden Point for a year, before joining East Ballarat as senior coach. In his five years coaching East Ballarat, they made the Ballarat Football League grand final four times, for three premierships, in 1989, 1990 and 1993. As a player, he won two best and fairests (1990, 1992).

== Coaching in Queensland ==
Odgers, who moved to Queensland in 1995, was an assistant coach of the Mt Gravatt team that were premiers in 2002. He was senior coach in 2003, replacing Danny Craven, but resigned during the season for business and health reasons. In 2006 he took over from David Hart as Redland coach and held the job for two years.
