= Bouvier's Law Dictionary =

American legal dictionary

Bouvier's Law Dictionary is a set consisting of two or three books with a long tradition in the United States legal community. The first edition was written by John Bouvier.

John Bouvier (1787–1851) was born in Codognan, France, but came to the United States at an early age. He became a U.S. citizen in 1812, was admitted to the bar in 1818, and began practicing law in Philadelphia. During his years of practice and study, he noticed the lack of a solid American law dictionary. He decided to fill this need, and worked on a new law dictionary incessantly for 10 years. One of his main goals was to distinguish American law from its English antecedent. He finally presented it for publication in 1839. Like many of his generation, Bouvier used his preface to justify his work, stating the irrelevance of English legal dictionaries to the American legal system of the United States. He wanted to create a new law dictionary that would address the American legal system, so he derived his definitions almost wholly from customs, court decisions, and statutes of the United States.

From his preface:

"…most of the matter in the English law dictionaries will be found to have been written while the feudal law was in its full vigor, and not fitted to the present times, nor calculated for present use, even in England. And there is a great portion which, though useful to an English lawyer, is almost useless to the American student. What, for example, have we to do with those laws of Great Britain which relate to the person of their king, their nobility, their clergy, their navy, their army; with their game laws; their local statutes, such as regulate their banks, their canals, their exchequer, their marriages, their births, their burials, their beer and ale houses, and a variety of similar subjects?"

In addition, Bouvier included entries for all the states that had formed the union as of 1839. A large 2-volume work, Bouvier's dictionary has been especially useful for understanding obsolete terms given in older authorities, amplifying their meanings in the American context.

The dictionary quickly became popular and received excellent reviews. Bouvier made significant contribution to each new edition and rewrote several articles. Many well known legal scholars have contributed to its revisions. Bouvier published three editions in twelve years and was preparing a fourth at the time of his death in 1851. By the year 1886, when it was first revised, there had been fifteen editions. The work is still widely used.

== See also ==
- Black's Law Dictionary

== Bibliographic entries ==
- A LAW DICTIONARY. Philadelphia : T. and J. W. Johnson, 1839. 2 vols.
- A LAW DICTIONARY. 4th ed. Philadelphia : Printed for the estate of John Bouvier, 1852. 2 vols.
- A LAW DICTIONARY. 5th ed. Philadelphia : Printed for the estate of John Bouvier, 1855. 2 vols.
- A LAW DICTIONARY. 6th ed. Philadelphia : Childs & Peterson, 1856. 2 vols.
- A LAW DICTIONARY. 8th ed. Philadelphia : G.W. Childs, 1859. 2 vols.
- A LAW DICTIONARY, adapted to the Constitution and laws of the United States of America, and of the several states of the American union : with references to the civil and other systems of foreign law. 14th ed., rev. and greatly enl. Philadelphia: J. B. Lippincott, 1878. 2 vols.
- BOUVIER'S LAW DICTIONARY AND CONCISE ENCYCLOPEDIA. 3rd revision (being the 8th ed.) / by Francis Rawle. Kansas City, Mo. : Vernon Law Book Co.; St. Paul, Minn. : West Pub., 1914. 3 vols.
- The Wolters Kluwer Bouvier Law Dictionary, General Editor Steve Sheppard, Kluwer, 2011, ISBN 978-0-73556-852-5
