= Butterworth's Annotated Legislation Service =

Butterworth's Annotated Legislation Service, formerly known as Butterworth's Emergency Legislation Service, contains annotated copies of certain Acts of the Parliament of the United Kingdom. It is published by Butterworths.

In 1982, Glanville Williams said that the Annotated Legislation Service was "useful" at the first appearance of an Act. It was not, however, regularly kept up to date by reissues or supplements. Williams said this was a "defect".

It has been said that "many" volumes of this work cover a single Act and have "very detailed" annotations.

Publication of this work began in 1939.

== Reprints ==
The following are reprints of Butterworth's Annotated Legislation Service:

- The Agriculture Act, 1947, by Anthony Cripps
- Town and Country Planning Act, 1947 (1948), by Harold A Hill and Daniel Patrick Kerrigan, is a reprint of number 48.
  - A supplement was to this book was published: Supplement to Hill and Kerrigan on the Town and Country Planning Act, 1947 (1949)
- The Companies Act, 1947, by S W Magnus
- The Finance Act, 1947, by H E Amos and Frank England
- The Electricity Act, 1947, by John Cornelius Dalton
- Valuation for Compensation and Development Charges (1948), by Ronald Collier
- The Finance Act, 1948, by William Lindsay
- The National Assistance Act, 1948 (1949), by R D Steele
- The Law of Merchandise Marks, including the Merchandise Marks Act, 1953 (March 1954), by H Fletcher Moulton and P C Landon-Davies
- Transport Act, 1953, by David Karmel and Kenneth Potter
- The Iron and Steel Act 1953, by Walter Gumbel and Kenneth Potter
- The Town and Country Planning Act 1954 (1955), by Daniel Patrick Kerrigan and J D James
- The Housing Repairs and Rents Act, 1954, by S W Magnus
- The Landlord and Tenant Act, 1954, by S W Magnus
- The Food and Drugs Act 1955, by J A O'Keefe
- The Sexual Offences Act, 1956, by C Bruce Orr. Leslie Boyd was consulting editor.
- The Rent Act, 1957, by S W Magnus
- Solicitors Act 1957 (1958), by Leslie J D Bunker
- The Caravan Sites and Control of Development Act 1960, by Graham Wilson
- The Road Traffic Acts, 1960 (1960), by Robert Schless, is a reprint of number 124
- Matrimonial Proceedings Before Magistrates (1961), by Leslie M Pugh and E Roydhouse, is a reprint of number 125.
- The Rating and Valuation Act, 1961, by E Roydhouse, is a reprint of number 129.
- The Public Health Act, 1961 (1962), by Graham Wilson, is a reprint of number 130
- Housing Act 1961, by Graham Wilson
- The Charities Act, 1960 (1962), by Lord Nathan, E G Nugee and J H Lidderdale, is a reprint of number 132.
- The Offices, Shops and Railway Premises Act 1963, by Ian Fife and E Anthony Machin, is a reprint of number 138.
- London Government Act 1963, by W Eric Jackson, is a reprint of number 138A.
- The Children and Young Persons Act 1963, by Robert Schless, is a reprint of number 139.
- J P Eddy and L L Loewe.
  - The New Law of Betting and Gaming. 1961. Reprint of number 122.
  - The New Law of Betting and Gaming. 2nd Edition. Reprint of number 140.
- The Finance Act, 1975, by J Jeffrey Cook, J M Rigby and G R N Cusworth.
