= Information Sources in Law =

Information Sources in Law is a book.

== First Edition ==
The first edition was edited by Robert G Logan and published by Butterworths in 1986. It is part of the series which was then known as Butterworths Guides to Information Sources. It consists of twenty-three chapters attributed to twenty contributors. The subject-matter of these chapters ranges from the general to the specialized. A book on legal research describes Information Sources in Law as being "not as useful for present purposes" as the title promises. Another described it as "good". The Solicitors' Journal expected that law libraries would find Logan's book to "prove useful". Information Sources in Law is "detailed" and its contributors are "leading experts".

== Second Edition ==
The second edition was edited by Jules Winterton and Elizabeth M Moys and published by Bowker-Saur in 1997. The series of which it was part is now known as Guides to Information Sources. It is "completely revised". It focuses on Europe, and deals with more than thirty of its jurisdictions.
