= Heinrich Brunner =

German historian (1840–1915)

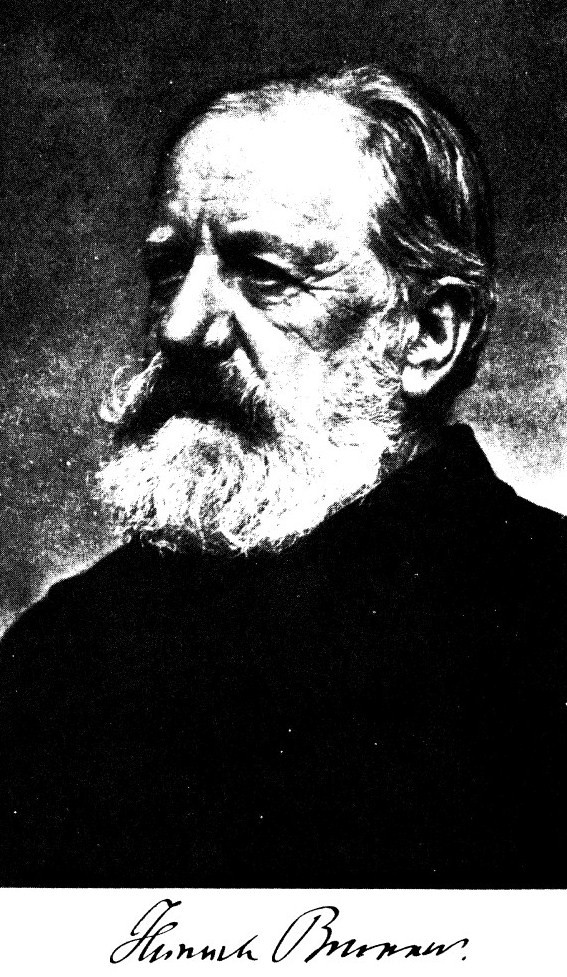
Heinrich Brunner

Heinrich Brunner (Austrian German: [ˈbrʊnɐ]; 21 June 1840 – 11 August 1915) was an Austrian legal scholar.

== Life ==
Brunner was born at Wels in Upper Austria. After studying at the universities of Vienna, Göttingen and Berlin, he became professor at the University of Lemberg in 1866, and in quick succession held similar positions at Prague, Strasbourg and Berlin.

From 1872, Brunner devoted himself especially to studying the early laws and institutions of the Franks and other antique peoples of Western Europe. In these studies, he traced the English legal system's emphasis on jury trials to the procedures of Frankish kings inspiring Henry II of England's Assize of Clarendon.

Brunner also became a leading authority on modern German law. He became a member of the Berlin Academy of Sciences in 1884, and in 1887, after the death of Georg Waitz, undertook the supervision of the Leges section of the Monumenta Germaniae Historica (MGH).

Brunner stayed with the MGH until his death in 1915 in Bad Kissingen. This was the first time that a legal scholar led a section of the MGH; Brunner oversaw an extensive overhaul of the section's program (the re-editing of the Capitularia and the Lex Alamannorum, then the Lex Burgundionum, and finally the Lex Baiuvariorum).

== Works ==
Brunner wrote:

- Die Entstehung der Schwurgerichte (Berlin, 1872)
- Zeugen und Inquisitionsbeweis der karolingischen Zeit (Vienna, 1866)
- Das anglonormannische Erbfolgesystem. Ein Beitrag zur Parentelenordnung nebst einem Exkurs über die älteren normannischen Coutumes (Leipzig, 1869)
- Zur Rechtsgeschichte der römischen und germanischen Urkunde (Berlin, 1880)
- Deutsche Rechtsgeschichte (Leipzig, 1887–1892)
- Mithio und Sperantes (Berlin, 1885)
- Die Landschenkungen der Merowinger und Agilolfinger (Berlin, 1885)
- Die Herkunft der Schoeffen (Berlin, 1888) [transl: The Origin of the Echevin]
- Das Gerichtszeugnis und die fränkische Königsurkunde (Berlin, 1873)
- Forschungen zur Geschichte des deutschen und franzsöschen Rechts (Stuttgart, 1894)
- Grundzüge der deutschen Rechtsgeschichte (Leipzig, 1901)

He is also the author of the German versions of The Sources of English Law.
