= Clarence Gabriel Moran =

Barrister and writer (died 1953)

Clarence Gabriel Moran (died 15 May 1953), barrister and writer, was educated at Wadham College, Oxford, where he obtained a third in Mods in 1897, and graduated BA in 1899 (in the second class in History). He obtained a first class pass in Roman law in the Trinity Bar Examinations, 1901. He became a barrister of the Inner Temple in January 1902. He was an examiner of the court, empowered to take examination of witnesses in all Divisions of the High Court. He was assistant deputy coroner for the South London District from 1927. He is said to have been "well known" and "noteworthy".

== Reports ==
Moran was a law reporter. He was sub editor of the Law Journal Reports, Chancery Division. He reported Divisional Court, civil paper cases and parliamentary and municipal registration appeals cases for the Justice of the Peace Reports, and House of Lords cases for the Law Times Reports. He reported cases for the Times Law Reports.

== Books and articles ==
Moran was joint author, with Herbert Walter Rowsell of A Guide to the Law of Betting, Civil & Criminal published in 1911 by Butterworth and Co.

Moran was also author of:

- The Business of Advertising (Meuthen, London, 1905, part of the "Books on Business" series)
- The Alphabet of the National Insurance Act, 1911 (Meuthen, London, 1912)
- The Boarding House Proprietor and His Guest (W Paterson, Salford, Manchester, 1925)

=== The Heralds of the Law ===
Moran was also author of The Heralds of the Law, a book on the subject of law reports, published in 1948 by Stevens and Sons Ltd in London, and by the Carswell Company Limited in Toronto. Its content includes material previously published in a series of articles in The Law Times from 1946 to 1947. This book was reprinted by Gaunt in 1996 in Holmes Beach, Florida. The periodical articles reprinted in this book are said to be "important and instructive". The book is popular has been called "delightful", "illuminating" and "well written".

Of the articles reprinted in this book: Moran's article "Law Reporting: The Headnote" has been described as "erudite". An abridged version of "Two Great Elizabethan Reporters" was published in Case and Comment.
