= Encyclopaedia of Forms and Precedents =

Legal encyclopaedia published by LexisNexis

The Encyclopaedia of Forms and Precedents (5th Edition)
- Encyclopaedia of Forms and Precedents Fifth Edition 1997 Reissue Volume 35
- Author: Tim Wakefield (Publisher)
- Language: English
- Subject: Law
- Publisher: LexisNexis Butterworths
- Publication date: 1902 – Ongoing
- Publication place: United Kingdom
- Preceded by: The Encyclopaedia of Forms and Precedents (4th Edition)

The Encyclopaedia of Forms and Precedents is a large collection of non-litigious legal forms and precedents published by LexisNexis UK.

The encyclopaedia is available in hard copy, on a searchable online database, and on CD-ROM. It currently consists of 90+ volumes which are subject to constant alteration, as volumes are regularly revised and reissued to reflect changes in the law. Subscribers are provided with frequent updates in the form of modifications to the online database, and a quarterly looseleaf service.

The encyclopaedia is most often subscribed to and utilised by legal practices and academic institutions.

The First Edition was published in 17 volumes from 1902 to 1910. The Second Edition was published in 20 volumes in 1925. The Third Edition was published in 20 volumes from 1946 to 1951.

== See also ==
- Halsbury's Laws of England
- Halsbury's Statutes
- LexisNexis Butterworths
