= The Abbreviacion of Statutis =

16th-century English legal book by John Rastell

The Abbreviacion of Statutis (1519), of which fifteen editions appeared before 1625, is a book by John Rastell. It, and Termes de la Ley, are the best known of his legal works.

It is said to be the first abridgement of the Statutes printed in English. It appears to be a translation with additions of the Abridgment des Statutes vieux.
