= A Bibliographical Guide to the Law of the United Kingdom, the Channel Islands, and the Isle of Man =

A Bibliographical Guide to the Law of the United Kingdom, the Channel Islands, and the Isle of Man is a bibliography of law. It was published by the Institute of Advanced Legal Studies of the University of London. The first edition was edited by Frederick Henry Lawson and H K Drake. It was published in 1956. It is "most comprehensive" and of "high merit and painstaking efficiency". The second edition was edited by A G Chloros and published in 1973. It is "useful".
