= Mathew Bacon =

Mathew Bacon (c. 1700 – c. 1775) was the compiler of the first three volumes, and part of the fourth volume, of the work New Abridgement of the Law known as Bacon's Abridgement. This became the standard encyclopedia of common law on both sides of the Atlantic Ocean in the 18th century.
