= Inventors Digest =

- Editor: Reid Creager
- Frequency: Monthly
- Publisher: Louis Foreman
- Founded: 1985
- Company: Enventys
- Country: USA
- Based in: Charlotte, North Carolina
- Language: English
- Website: Inventors Digest

Inventors Digest is a monthly magazine and web site devoted to promoting the interests of independent and professional inventors. It was founded in 1985 as an eight-page newsletter. The magazine is the United States' longest-running monthly magazine for inventor-entrepreneurs, and it explores the intersection of innovation and business. The magazine is part of Enventys, a product development company, which was founded by Louis Foreman. The company acquired the magazine in 2007. It is headquartered in Charlotte, North Carolina.
