= John Maxcy Zane =

American lawyer

John Maxcy Zane (March 26, 1863 – December 6, 1937) was an American lawyer.

Zane was born in Springfield, Illinois. He was admitted to the bar in 1888 and spent eleven years practicing law in the state of Utah. Zane would spend the remainder of his career in Chicago, teaching briefly at the Northwestern University School of Law and the University of Chicago.

Zane specialized in patent, trademark, and commercial law.

Zane is best known among legal historians for his highly critical review (Michigan Law Review, 13 (1915) 439-465) of George Deiser's edition of the Year Books of Richard II: 12 Richard II (A.D. 1388-1389) (Ames Foundation [Harvard Law School], 1914). That review was still being cited as an authority in Maurice Holland's edition of Year Books of Richard II: 7 Richard II (A.D. 1383-1384) (Ames Foundation, 1989), ix, n. 2; x; 3 n. 3.

== Sources ==
- Zane, John Maxcy (1998). Charles J. Reid, Jr. (ed.). The Story of Law (2nd ed.). Indianapolis, In: Liberty Fund Inc. – via Internet Archive.
- John Maxcy Zane, The Multiplication of Laws and Lawyers (1927)

John maxcy zane. (2014). Retrieved 11/21, 2014, from http://oll.libertyfund.org/people/john-maxcy-zane
