= The Digest =

Digest of case law

The Digest, formerly published as The English and Empire Digest, is a digest of case law. It is the "major modern work" of this kind. Its coverage is "wide" but incomplete, and it can be "complicated to use" if the user does not understand how the editions overlap. In 1994, it included cases from England and Wales, Scotland, Ireland, Australia, New Zealand, Canada and other parts of the Commonwealth, and from the European Communities. More than half a million cases from more than a thousand series of law reports were summarised. The work also serves as a citator and is "valuable" because of this.

== Editions ==
=== First Edition ===
The English and Empire Digest was published in 49 volumes from 1919 to 1932. This was directed by the Earl of Halsbury and Sir Thomas Willes Chitty.

=== "Blue Band" Replacement Edition ===
This edition was published in 56 volumes from 1950 to 1970.

=== "Green Band" Reissue Edition ===
Publication of the third edition, or "Green Band" Reissue Edition, began in 1971. In 1981, its name was changed to The Digest. It contains the fullest listing of the case law of the United Kingdom, including almost all reported decisions from the sixteenth century.
