= Percy Henry Winfield =

British legal scholar

Sir Percy Henry Winfield FBA (16 September 1878 – 7 July 1953) was Rouse Ball Professor of English Law between 1928 and 1943. He was born at Stoke Ferry in Norfolk. He died at his home at 13 Cranmer Road in Cambridge. He was married to Lady Helena Winfield, née Scruby (1887 - 1954). He was a fellow of St John's College, Cambridge.

== Works ==
He was the author of

- The History of Conspiracy and Abuse of Legal Procedure. 1921.
- The Present Law of Abuse of Legal Procedure. 1921.
- The Chief Sources of English Legal History. 1925.
- The Principles of International Law. By T J Lawrence. 7th Ed: 1923. Reprinted 1930, 1931.
- A Handbook of Public International Law. By T J Lawrence. 10th Ed: 1925. Reprinted 1927, 1930.
- The Province of the Law of Tort. 1931. (Tagore Lectures).
- A Text-Book of the Law of Tort. 1937. 2nd Ed: 1943. 3rd Ed: 1946. 4th Ed: 1948. 5th Ed: 1950. [Sometimes cited as "A Text-Book on the Law of Tort."] This book was subsequently edited by others and published under the title Winfield and Jolowicz on Tort.
- Cases on the Law of Tort. 1938. 2nd Ed: 1941. 3rd Ed: 1945. 4th Ed: 1948.
- Restatement of the Law of Torts, Volume III. Contemporary Law Pamphlets, Series 1, Number 23. 1939.
- Restatement of the Law of Torts, Volume IV. Contemporary Law Pamphlets, Series 1, Number 31. 1941.
- The Foundations & the Future of International Law. 1941. Sometimes cited as "The Foundations and the Future of International Law". This book is number 8 in the Current Problems series.
- The Principles of Contract. 11th Ed: 1942. Pollock's Principles of Contract. 12th Ed: 1946. 13th Ed: 1950.
- Jenks' English Civil Law. 4th Ed: 1947. Some reviewers call Winfield the editor in chief.
- The Law of Quasi-Contracts. 1952. This monograph has been described as "excellent".
- Select Legal Essays. 1952.

He was author, with Sir John William Salmond, of Principles of the Law of Contracts (1927). He was editor, with Arnold Duncan McNair, of Cambridge Legal Essays (1926). He contributed the preface to Penal Reform In England (1941. 2nd Ed: 1946.) by Radzinowicz and Turner.

== Sources ==
- Donal Nolan. "Professor Sir Percy Winfield (1878-1953)". James Goudkamp and Donal Nolan (eds). Scholars of Tort Law. Hart Publishing. 2019. Chapter 6. Pages 165 to 201.
- Bailey, S J. "Winfield, Sir Percy Henry (1878-1953)". Oxford Dictionary of National Biography (online ed.). Oxford University Press. doi:10.1093/ref:odnb/36976. (Subscription or UK public library membership required.)
- Jones, Gareth H. "Winfield, Sir Percy Henry". In A. W. B. Simpson. Biographical Dictionary of the Common Law. Butterworths. 1984. pp. 545 – 546.
- The Times. 16 July 1953.
- Connecticut Bar Journal. Volume 27. Connecticut Bar Association. 1953. Page 391.
- "Sir Percy Winfield" in "Obituary" (1953) 216 The Law Times 386 (24 July 1953)
- "The Late Professor Winfield" (1953) 97 The Solicitors' Journal 496 (18 July 1953)
