= Marvin's Legal Bibliography =

Legal Bibliography is a book by John Gage Marvin, and was his best-known work. It is a bibliography of law. It was the first publication of its kind to originate from the United States of America. Marvin was then a librarian at Harvard University and would later serve as the first California State Superintendent of Public Instruction.

This work was preceded by an 1843 edition of a work on international law by Sir James Mackintosh, with reading list, and an 1846 Catalogue of the Harvard Law Library including recent accessions. The Bibliography is in alphabetical by author, with a topical index, and includes evaluative comments on the works, drawing on numerous sources. Despite the impression given by its short title, the Bibliography was an attempt to integrate other legal works into the Anglo-American tradition.

In 1857, the Upper Canada Law Journal and Lower Courts Gazette said "Mr. Marvin's, Legal Bibliography, is by far the completest work of its kind we have had".

Harvard University Library Notes said that this book was, "for many years" after its first publication, "the best American work of its kind".

In the Proceedings of the First Annual Meeting of the Virginia State Bar Association, this book was described as "good in its day, but now more than 40 years old".

In 1914, Percy Winfield said that this book was a "valuable" guide "to the materials of English law", that it appeared to be little known in England, that the critical notes were appended to certain classics and reporters and were necessarily brief, especially in relation to the Year Books, that the book was an index of authors rather than topics, and that a new edition was needed.

In 1988, Bookman's Yearbook said that the fact that this book was still in use indicated "the sorry state" that legal bibliography was in, the book being "like a third class Lowndes or Brunet".

== Criticisms ==
The Harvard Law Review said, in relation to Year-Book bibliography, that Marvin's Legal Bibliography discloses little that is valuable and its accuracy does not stand the test of verification.

In his preface, Marvin says that upon reviewing this volume, he discovered that some titles were omitted, and that some dates were erroneous.
