= Charles Viner (jurist) =

English jurist

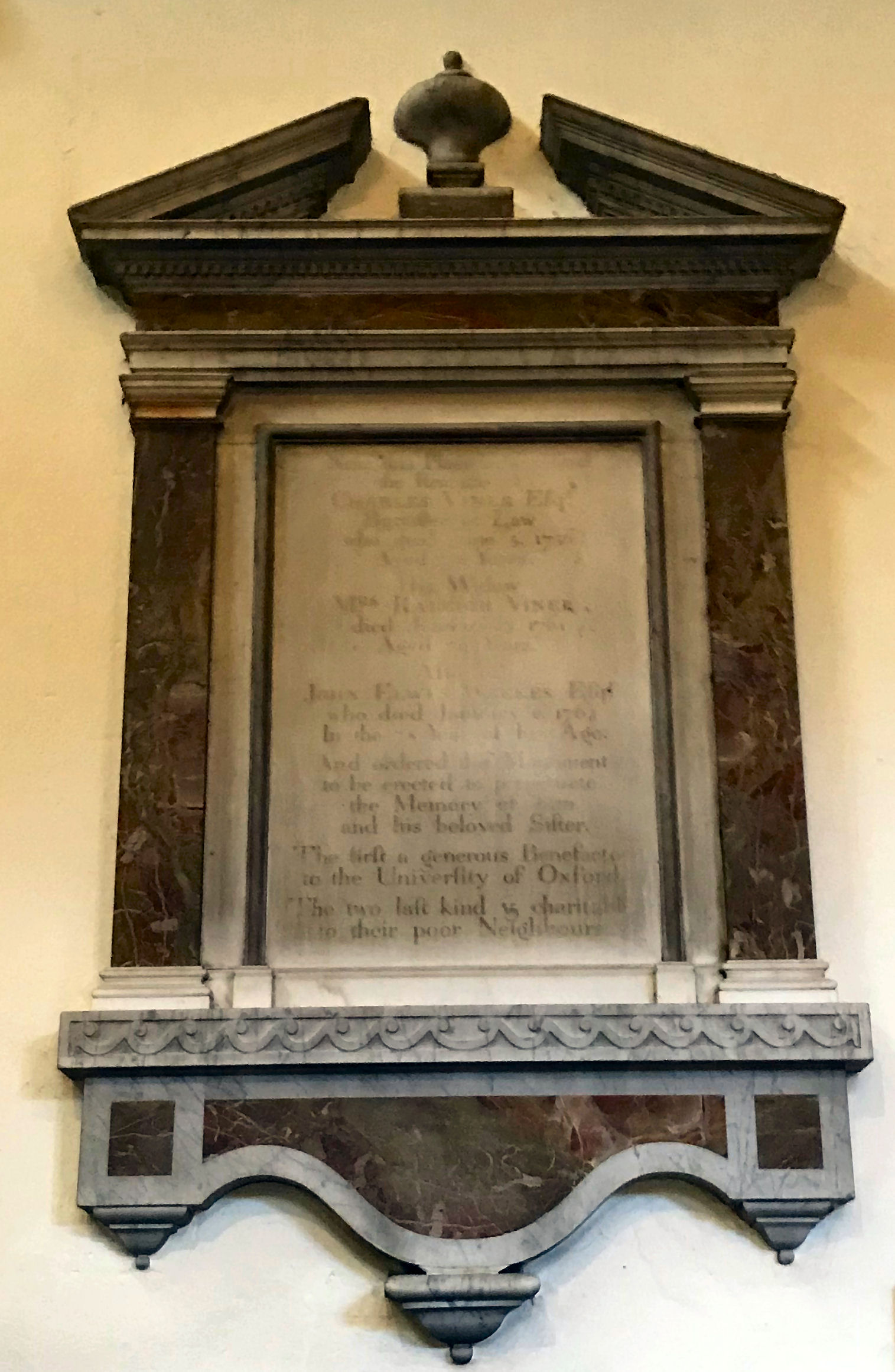
The memorial to Charles Viner, his wife Raleigh Viner and brother-in-law John Elwes Weekes in St Michael's church in Aldershot

Charles Viner (1678 – 5 June 1756) was an English jurist, known as the author of Viner's Abridgment, and the benefactor of the Vinerian chair and the Vinerian Scholarship at the University of Oxford.

== Life ==
The son of Mary and Charles Viner, a draper of Salisbury, he was baptised at the church of St Thomas, Salisbury, on 3 November 1678. He studied for a time at Oxford, where he matriculated at Hart Hall on 19 February 1695. He then resided at Aldershot, Hampshire, and had chambers in the Temple (King's Bench Walk), but was not called to the bar. He married Raleigh Weekes (1681–1761), a descendant of Walter Raleigh, on 16 November 1699 at Saint Ethelburga's church in Bishopsgate in London. There were no children from the marriage.

Viner died at Aldershot on 5 June 1756. He and his wife are buried in the churchyard of St Michael's church in Aldershot and have a memorial plaque inside the church.

== Legacy ==
By his will, dated 29 December 1755, Viner left the remainder copies of the Abridgment and his residuary real and personal estate (value about £12,000) to the University of Oxford upon trusts. Effect was given to the bequest by the endowment of the Vinerian common-law chair, scholarships, and fellowships. The first professor was Sir William Blackstone.

== Viner's Abridgment ==
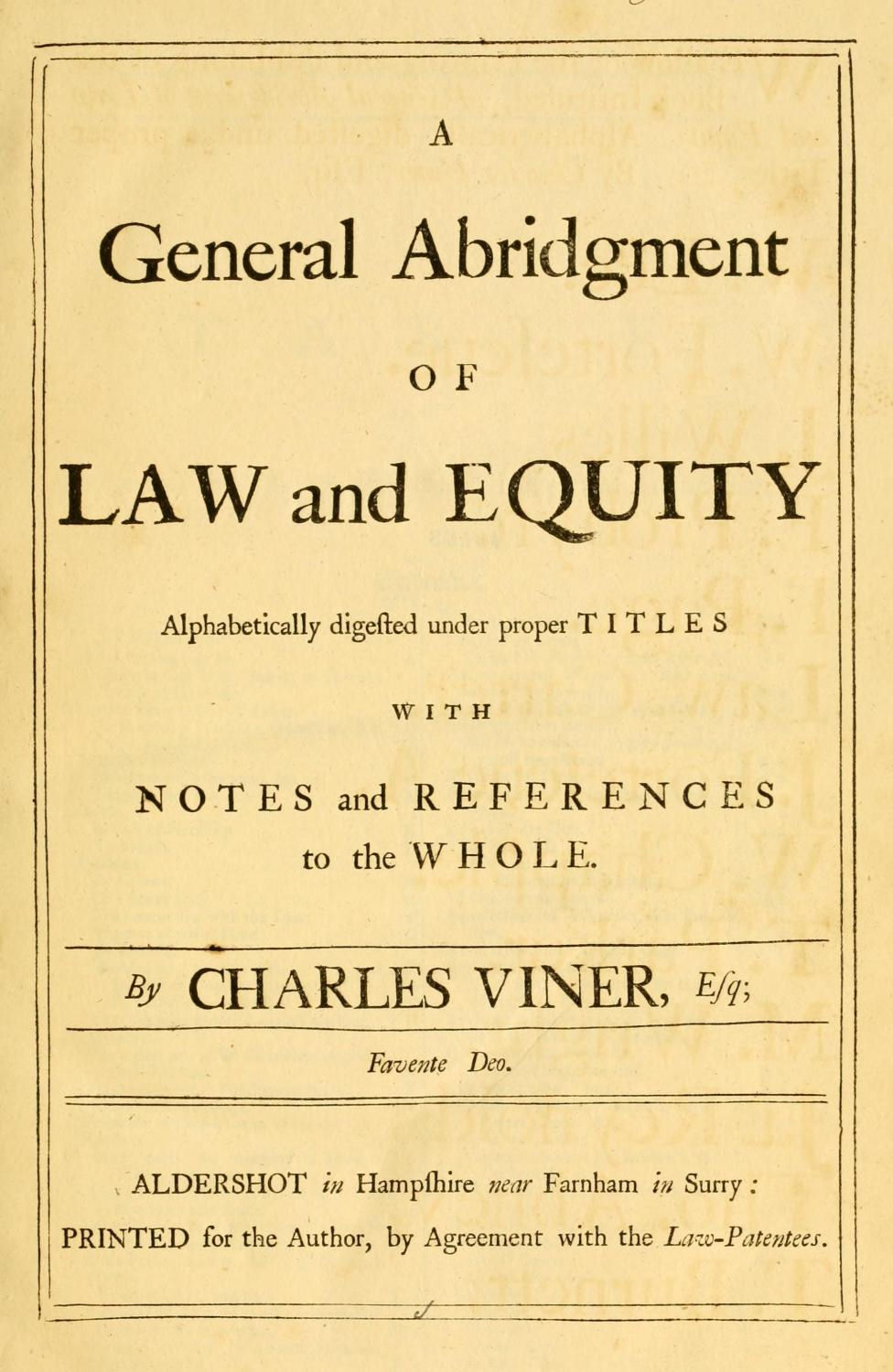
Title page of Viner's A General Abridgment of Law and Equity

Viner devoted half a century to the compilation of A General Abridgment of Law and Equity. Alphabetically digested under proper Titles, with Notes and References to the whole, Aldershot, 1742–53, 23 vols. folio. It was printed on a press at his home in Aldershot on paper manufactured under Viner's own direction with his initials 'C.V.' in the watermark.

Based on the work of Viner's predecessor Henry Rolle, but built up from other material, it is a vast encyclopædia of legal lore. An Alphabetical Index was compiled by Robert Kelham (1758). A second edition of the work, including the index, appeared at London in 1791–4, 24 vols., and was followed by a supplement by several hands, entitled An Abridgment of the Modern Determinations in the Courts of Law and Equity, London, 1799–1806, 6 vols.

J. G. Marvin wrote of it:

This laborious author spent nearly fifty years upon his Abridgment, the most voluminous production of any single individual in the whole bibliography of the Common Law. Whatever is to be found in the old Abridgments, or in all printed and several MS. Reports anterior to Geo. III., Mr. Viner has translated, abridged, remodelled, and introduced or referred to in his work. The author is thought, by Mr. Hargrave, to have erred in making Rolle's Abridgment the basis of his. The character of Mr. Viner's performance is thus given by Mr. Justice Story. "It is a cumbersome compilation, by no means accurate or complete in its citations, and difficult to use, from the irregularity with which the matter is distributed, and from the inadequacy, and sometimes the inaptness of the subdivisions. Indeed, every thing appears to have been thrown into it, without any successful attempt at method or exactness. Almost every thing valuable in the old Abridgments is, indeed, to be found in it, but sometimes so ill arranged, that the search is almost as troublesome as it would be to run over the whole title in Fitz-herbert or Brooke. Its principal merit is its extent; and, though in some points it is redundant, in others defective, and in all irregular, it is a vast Index of the law, which time and patience can master; and it often rewards the labour when all other resources have failed." As to the authority of the Abridgment, Foster, J., says - "Brother Viner is not an authority. Cite the Cases that Viner quotes—that you may do." Mr. Hoffman observes, "that Abridgments are to be regarded with a suspicion of their accuracy; and that the writer who abridges least is most to be relied on; hence Viner, as the repository of certain and ample information, is, perhaps, of all others, except the books of Reports, the safest for reference." Furthermore, there are a good many determinations in his publication, either not at all, or not so fully and accurately reported elsewhere, which are generally received as authority. The volume devoted to Evidence was separately published, of which Professor Whiteside remarks: "When a question of Evidence, of any novelty or difficulty arises, fail not to search the 12th vol., of the last edition of Viner's Abridgment." 1 Leg. Rep. 298; Pref. 18 Viner; 6 N. A. Rev. 74; (23)9; 1 Co. Lit. 45, a; 3 Co. Lit. 9 a, n 3; Woodesson's Elements, 175; 1 Kent, 510; Bridg. Bib. 350; 1 Burr. 364; 1 Hoff. Leg. Stu. 388; 2 Ves. Jr., 159; 1 Sch. & Lef. 380; Warren's L. S. 780.

== Notes ==
Attribution

This article incorporates text from a publication now in the public domain: Lee, Sidney, ed. (1899). "Viner, Charles". Dictionary of National Biography. Vol. 58. London: Smith, Elder & Co.
