= Legal bibliography =

Legal bibliography is the bibliography of law. The term has been applied to "the kinds and functions of legal materials" and to "lists of law books and related materials".

Percy Winfield said that a "perfect legal bibliography" would be "a critical and historical account of every known source of the law of the state with which it assumes to deal".

== History ==
In 1835, David Hoffman said that the legal bibliography of France and Germany, especially in the separate treatises on various branches of the law, was, by that date, "extensive, exact and learned". He also said that in England "in jurisprudence (beyond a naked catalogue) we have scarce another name than Bridgman".

Marvin's Legal Bibliography was the first publication of its kind to originate from the United States of America.

In 1988, Bookman's Yearbook said that legal bibliography was in a "sorry state".
