= List of judgments of the Supreme Court of the United Kingdom delivered in 2009 =

This is a complete list of the judgments given by the Supreme Court of the United Kingdom between the court's opening on 1 October 2009 and the end of that year. Most of the cases were heard in the House of Lords before judgments were given in the new Supreme Court. The court heard 17 cases during this time; they are listed in order of each case's Neutral citation number.

The table lists judgments made by the court and the opinions of the judges in each case. Judges are treated as having concurred in another's judgment when they either formally attach themselves to the judgment of another or speak only to acknowledge their concurrence with one or more judges. Any judgment which reaches a conclusion which differs from the majority on one or more major points of the appeal has been treated as dissent.

Because every judge in the court is entitled to hand down a judgment, it is not uncommon for groups of judges to reach the same conclusion (i.e. whether to allow or dismiss the appeal) in materially different ways, for example if a panel of 9 judges heard a case with 4 judges dismissing the appeal, 3 finding for the appellant on one point and 2 on another – the table should show 5 judges as the majority and the 4 judges who actually held the more mainstream view as dissenting. The table also does not reflect how significantly judges differed, or how much of a contribution a particular judge made to the overall judgment.

== 2009 case summaries ==
Unless otherwise noted, cases were heard by a panel of 5 judges.

Cases involving Scots law are highlighted in orange. Cases involving Northern Irish law are highlighted in green.

Case name	Citation	Decided	Legal subject	Summary of decision
R (E) v JFS	[2009] UKSC 1	14 October	Costs	
Re Sigma Finance	[2009] UKSC 2	29 October	Insolvency	
R (L) v Commissioner of Police of the Metropolis	[2009] UKSC 3	29 October	Police law, Article 8 ECHR	
Louca v Germany	[2009] UKSC 4	19 November	European Arrest Warrants	
In re B (A Child) (2009 ruling)	[2009] UKSC 5	19 November	Family law	
OFT v Abbey National	[2009] UKSC 6	25 November	Consumer rights	
PE (Cameroon) v Home Secretary	[2009] UKSC 7	26 November	Immigration	
R (A) v Croydon	[2009] UKSC 8	26 November	Family law, Article 6 ECHR	
R (Barclay) v Justice Secretary	[2009] UKSC 9	1 December	Government of Sark, Protocol 1, Article 3 ECHR	
I (A Child)	[2009] UKSC 10	1 December	Jurisdiction	
Environment Secretary v Meier & Ors	[2009] UKSC 11	1 December	Land law	
R(A) v B	[2009] UKSC 12	1 December	State secrets, Article 10 ECHR	
Barratt Homes Ltd v Welsh Water	[2009] UKSC 13	9 December	Water Industry Act 1991	
R v Horncastle	[2009] UKSC 14	9 December	Evidence, Article 6 ECHR	
R (E) v JFS	[2009] UKSC 15	16 December	Discrimination	
Mahad (Ethiopia) v Entry Clearance Officer	[2009] UKSC 16	16 December	Immigration	
Re S-B (Children)	[2009] UKSC 17	14 December	Family law	

== 2009 Opinions ==
Delivered a judgment (majority)	Concurred in the judgment of another justice (majority)	Delivered a judgment (dissenting)	Concurred in the judgment of another justice (dissent)	Did not participate in the decision

Case name	Citation	Argued	Decided	Phillips of Worth Matravers	Hope of Craighead	Saville of Newdigate	Rodger of Earlsferry	Walker of Gestingthorpe	Hale of Richmond	Brown of Eaton-under-Heywood	Mance	Collins of Mapesbury	Kerr of Tonaghmore	Clarke of Stone-cum-Ebony	Judge (Note: Non-Justice sitting as a supplementary)	Neuberger of Abbotsbury	Scott of Foscote
R (E) v JFS (Note: Procedural issue before the main appeal reported at UKSC 15)	[2009] UKSC 1	1 October	14 October
Re Sigma Finance	[2009] UKSC 2	1–2 July	29 October
R (L) v Commissioner of Police of the Metropolis	[2009] UKSC 3	13–14 July	29 October
Louca v Germany	[2009] UKSC 4	29 July	19 November
Re B (a child)	[2009] UKSC 5	14 October	19 November
OFT v Abbey National	[2009] UKSC 6	23–25 June	25 November
PE (Cameroon) v Home Secretary	[2009] UKSC 7	30 July	26 November
R (A) v Croydon	[2009] UKSC 8	20–23 July	26 November
R (Barclay) v Justice Secretary	[2009] UKSC 9	15–16 July	1 December
I (A Child)	[2009] UKSC 10	10–11 June	1 December
Environment Secretary v Meier & Ors	[2009] UKSC 11	10–11 June	1 December
R(A) v B	[2009] UKSC 12	10–11 June	1 December
Barratt Homes Ltd v Welsh Water	[2009] UKSC 13	27–28 July	9 December
R v Horncastle (Note: An augmented panel of 7 judges sat in this case)	[2009] UKSC 14	7–9 July	9 December
R (E) v JFS (Note: An augmented panel of 9 judges sat in this case)	[2009] UKSC 15	27–29 October	16 December
Mahad (Ethiopia) v Entry Clearance Officer	[2009] UKSC 16	9–11 November	16 December
Re S-B (Children)	[2009] UKSC 17	25–26 November	14 December

== Judges ==
- Lord Saville was unavailable for much of the year owing to the ongoing Bloody Sunday Inquiry, which he was chairing.
- Lord Scott of Foscote is a former Lord of Appeal in Ordinary. He did not formally accept a position in the reformed Supreme Court but was invited to take part in several cases. If Scott had accepted the position, his mandatory retirement would have been 2 October 2009 – the day after the Court officially opened.
- Lord Judge was the Lord Chief Justice and not a Justice of the Supreme Court. He sat in one case in his capacity as a senior judge.
- Lord Neuberger of Abbotsbury was the Master of the Rolls and not an official member of the Supreme Court. As a senior judge, he was entitled to sit in cases at the court's discretion.
- The other members of the court are listed in order of seniority. Lord Phillips of Worth Matravers and Lord Hope of Craighead were, respectively, the President and Deputy President throughout all of the cases in 2009.
