= Ailsa Carmichael, Lady Carmichael =

Scottish advocate and judge (born 1969)

The Right Honourable Lady Carmichael

Senator of the College of Justice
- Incumbent
- Assumed office 30 June 2016
- Nominated by: Nicola Sturgeon; As First Minister
- Monarch: Elizabeth II

Personal details
- Born: Ailsa Jane Carmichael; 26 November 1969 (age 56) Paisley, Scotland
- Spouse: Paul Barnaby (m. 1997; div. 2008) Pino Di Emidio (m. 2010)
- Children: 3
- Education: University of Glasgow
- Occupation: judge, lawyer
- Profession: Advocate

Ailsa Jane Carmichael, Lady Carmichael (born 26 November 1969) is a Scottish advocate and judge who has served as a Senator of the College of Justice since 2016. Separately, Lady Carmichael has served as President of the Investigatory Powers Tribunal since 1 November 2025 having been its vice president prior to that.

== Early life ==
Ailsa Jane Carmichael was born on 28 November 1969 in Paisley, Renfrewshire, the eldest of two daughters to Ian Henry Buist Carmichael and Jean Cowie Carmichael (née Davidson). Her father was an advocate and worked for the Scottish Legal Action Group. Carmichael's younger sister Heather is an advocate, working in Westwater Advocates.

In 1986, after leaving school from fifth year, Carmichael attended the University of Glasgow School of Law. She studied abroad at the Erasmus University in Rotterdam and worked in law firms in Amsterdam. In 1990, she graduated with an LLB (hons) (Upper Second Class specialising in Comparative Law) and gained a Diploma in Legal Practice the following year.

== Legal career ==
After receiving her Diploma in Legal Practice in 1991, she undertook a bar traineeship with Simpson & Marwick in Edinburgh after which she was admitted as an advocate in 1993, and devilled for sheriff J.A. Baird and for S.J. MacGibbon. From 2000 to 2008 she was standing junior counsel to the Home Office in Scotland, appearing in many judicial reviews and statutory appeals relating to immigration and asylum. She was junior counsel to the Fingerprint Inquiry, which investigated the use of fingerprint evidence in the case of Detective Constable Shirley McKie.

She took silk in 2008.

Carmichael specialises in public and administrative law. She served as an advocate depute, as a member of the Mental Health Tribunal for Scotland, and as a part-time sheriff.

From 2011 to 2014, Carmichael was a tutor in human rights at the Diploma in Legal Practice course at the University of Edinburgh.

In a judgement published on 21 October 2021, Carmichael found that the environmental agency NatureScot had erred in law in failing to give reasons for issuing licences for the killing of beavers.

== Senator of the College of Justice ==
On 11 May 2016, it was announced that Carmichael would be one of five new judges appointed to the College of Justice, the others being John Beckett, Alistair Clark, Frank Mulholland, and Andrew Stewart. Mulholland's appointment was not due to take effect until later in 2016, after the retirement of another judge. The other four appointees were to fill existing vacancies. Beckett, Clark and Stewart were all installed in May, however Carmichael's installation came a month later, on 30 June 2016. She took the judicial title Lady Carmichael.

== Experience of sexism, and the importance of women role models ==
Carmichael has spoken about experiencing sexism and sexual harassment in her legal training, and of the effect of being a parent on her studies. She has said:

I think that it is sometimes harder than we acknowledge to free ourselves from traditional narratives about the roles of men and women respectively in society generally, and in professional life in particular. We know intellectually that they are not true, or do not need to be true. But it is still much rarer, I am afraid, to hear a woman described as "brilliant" than it is a man. Expectations as to "soft skills" are still higher in relation to women than they are in relation to men. Even when women achieve high office, these more subtle narratives and expectations have a way of persisting. Having visible examples of women who have succeeded in law has been important to me.

— Lady Carmichael, 100 Voices for 100 Years, University of Glasgow

== Personal life ==
In 1997 she married Paul Barnaby. They had a daughter and son. Their marriage was dissolved in 2008. In 2010 she married Pino Di Emidio; they have a daughter.

== See also ==
- Scots law
- Courts of Scotland
