= Bruce Weir, Lord Weir =

Scottish lawyer and judge (born 1931)

David Bruce Weir, Lord Weir (born 19 December 1931) is a Scottish retired lawyer and judge. He was a Senator of the College of Justice in Scotland from 1985 to 1997.

== Life and career ==
The son of a marine engineer, Weir was educated at Kelvinside Academy, The Glasgow Academy The Leys School, before attending the University of Glasgow. He was admitted to the Faculty of Advocates in 1959 and was appointed an advocate depute in 1964. He became a Queen's Counsel in 1971. A keen sailor, he was a member of the Royal Naval Reserve from 1955 until 1964.

Lord Weir was appointed a Senator of the College of Justice in 1985, in succession to Lord Mackay of Clashfern. He was installed on the same day as the retirement of his father-in-law, Lord Cameron.

In 1990, he was one of three Scottish judges questioned by Lord Hope over allegations of homosexual conduct, which eventually led to the resignation of Lord Dervaird.

His son Robert Weir, Lord Weir has been a Senator of the College of Justice since 2020, having taken the same judicial title as his father.
