= Edward John Griew =

Professor Edward Griew
- Born: 1926
- Died: 1996 (aged 69–70)
- Education: UCL
- Occupations: Legal scholar, Barrister
- Organization(s): University of Leicester and University of Nottingham
- Known for: Criminal law

Professor Edward John Griew (1926–1996) was an English legal scholar, barrister and law reformer whose work bridged legal practice, academic theory, and legislative reform. His writings on theft, dishonesty, recklessness, and jury directions shaped the structure and interpretation of modern English criminal law.

He was Professor of Law at the Universities of Leicester and Nottingham, an adviser to the Judicial Studies Board and Law Commission, and a long-serving contributor to the Criminal Law Review.

== Early life and education ==
Griew was born in 1926 in England. He was educated at King Edward's School, Birmingham, and he studied law at University College London. He was called to the Bar at Gray’s Inn in 1950.

== Academic career ==
After lecturing at UCL, Griew joined the University of Leicester, later becoming Professor of Law, Pro-Vice-Chancellor (1976–1987), and Public Orator (1977–1979). In the late 1980s he moved to the University of Nottingham where he would become Emeritus Professor.

His teaching and writing covered theft, dishonesty, recklessness, mental disorder, and the moral foundations of criminal law.

Griew was a long-serving member of the Criminal Law Review editorial board and its General Editor from 1964 to 1966.

=== Criminal Code Project ===
Griew was a member of the group of academic lawyers chaired by Professor J.C. Smith (known as the "Criminal Code team") who, in the early 1980s, worked under the auspices of the Law Commission to report on consolidation and codification of the general part of the criminal law into a Criminal Code. Smith, Griew and Dr Ian Dennis (as he then was) co-authored Codification of the Criminal Law, a Report to the Law Commission (Law Com No 143, 1985).

Their analytical work from 1983–1985 was incorporated into the Commission's final report, A Criminal Code for England and Wales (Law Com No 177, 1989). Griew’s analyses of dishonesty and recklessness are cited in discussions of mens rea and general principles of criminal liability (see Part II).

For the history of consolidation and codification more generally, see Criminal Code of England and Wales.

=== Judicial Studies Board ===
Griew was an academic adviser to the Judicial Studies Board, serving on its Crown Court Committee and helping to draft the first Specimen Directions to the Jury (1984), the forerunner of the modern Crown Court Bench Book and Judicial College Crown Court Compendium.

In Summing-Up the Law [1989] Crim.L.R. 768 he argued that judges should “protect the jury from the law” by using clear, factual language—a principle adopted by the JSB in its guidance on summing-up.

=== Impact and legacy ===
Griew was an early and staunch critic of the Court of Appeal's formulation of the test of dishonesty in R v Ghosh [1982] EWCA Crim 2: see "Dishonesty—The Objections to Feely and Ghosh" [1985] Crim.L.R. 341. Ultimately, his views were vindicated when Ghosh was doubted by the Supreme Court in Ivey v Genting Casinos [2017] UKSC 67 and set aside by the Court of Appeal in R v Barton and Booth [2020] EWCA Crim 575.

His approach to jury directions, urging simplicity and moral intelligibility, underpins the Judicial College’s current model directions.

== Selected publications ==
=== Books ===
- Griew, Edward (1970-1995). The Theft Acts 1968 (and 1978) (1st-7th edns). London: Sweet & Maxwell.
- Griew, Edward (1974). Dishonesty and the Jury. Leicester: Leicester University Press.
- Griew, Edward (1977). The Criminal Law Act 1977: Commentary and Analysis. London: Sweet & Maxwell, 1977.

=== Selected journal articles ===
- Diminished Responsibility and the Trial of Lunatics Act 1883 [1957] Crim.L.R. 521.
- Imputations on the Character of the Prosecutor or the Witnesses for the Prosecution—A Restatement [1961] Crim.L.R. 142.
- Compensation for Victims of Violence [1962] Crim.L.R. 801.
- What the Butler Said He Saw [1965] Crim.L.R. 91.
- The Widgery Committee on Legal Aid in Criminal Proceedings [1966] Crim.L.R. 246.
- The Behaviour of the Jury—A Review of the American Evidence [1967] Crim.L.R. 555.
- The Order of Defence Evidence [1969] Crim.L.R. 347.
- Taking a Taxi-Driver for a Ride [1970] M.L.R. 217.
- The Law Commission’s Working Paper on Forgery: A General Comment [1970] Crim.L.R. 548.
- Directions to Convict [1972] Crim.L.R. 204.
- Two Law Reform Working Papers on Fraud [1975] Crim.L.R. 70.
- Consistency, communication and codification—reflections on two mens rea words (1978).
- Non-Fatal Offences and Self-Defence [1977] Crim.L.R. 91.
- Theft and Obtaining by Deception: R. v. Hircock [1979] Crim.L.R. 292.
- Reckless Damage and Reckless Driving: Living with Caldwell and Lawrence [1981] Crim.L.R. 743.
- Common Assault and the Statute Book [1983] Crim.L.R. 710.
- Another Nail for M'Naghten's Coffin? [1984] N.L.J. 935.
- Let's Implement Butler on Mental Disorder and Crime! [1984] C.L.P. 47.
- Dishonesty—The Objections to Feely and Ghosh [1985] Crim.L.R. 341.
- Stealing and Obtaining Bank Credits [1986] Crim.L.R. 356.
- Unauthorised overdrawing by use of cheque card abroad [1987] J.I.B.L. 116.
- The Future of Diminished Responsibility [1988] Crim.L.R. 75.
- Summing-Up the Law [1989] Crim.L.R. 768.
- Alcoholism and Diminished Responsibility: R v Tandy [1991] Journal of Forensic Psychiatry 79.
- Alcoholism and Diminished Responsibility: R v Inseal [1992] Journal of Forensic Psychiatry 331.
