= David Ormerod =

British legal academic and barrister

David Christopher Ormerod CBE, KC (Hon), DCL (Hon) is a British legal academic and barrister. He is currently the Chair of Criminal Law and a Professor of Criminal Justice at the Faculty of Laws, University College London. He served as the Criminal Law Commissioner for England and Wales from 2010 to 2019.

== Early life ==
Ormerod was born in 1966 to parents Margaret (nee Schofield) and Derek. He was the second-born of three siblings.

== Academic and legal career ==
Ormerod graduated with an LLB from the University of Essex in 1989, before working for a year as a lecturer there. He then moved to the University of Nottingham, where he worked as a lecturer and a senior lecturer, meeting Professor John Cyril Smith, who later invited him to edit Smith & Hogan's Criminal Law., which was later restyled as Smith, Hogan and Ormerod's Criminal Law . Smith died in 2003, as Ormerod took professorships at the University of Hull and University of Leeds, before moving to Queen Mary University of London in 2007. In 2010, Ormerod took up a position as Law Commissioner at the Law Commission of England and Wales, responsible for all law reform projects relating to the criminal law.

During his secondment, Ormerod was made King's (then Queen's) Counsel (honoris causa, 2013), appointed as Professor of Criminal Justice at University College London, and appointed a deputy High Court judge in 2018. Ormerod was appointed Commander of the Order of the British Empire (CBE) in the 2021 New Year Honours for services to criminal justice.

== Impact ==
Ormerod has for over two decades been editor, now with Karl Laird, of Smith, Hogan and Ormerod's Criminal Law. (Laird's name added in 2018 in the 15th Edition). Originally Smith and Hogan, this volume is considered persuasive authority in England and Wales and other common law jurisdictions. Ormerod is also editor of Blackstone's Criminal Practice, was Consultant Editor for Halsbury's Laws of England Criminal Law (2020) and Criminal Evidence and Procedure (2021), and was General Editor of the Criminal Law Review (2012-2023).

Ormerod's work at the Law Commission was varied and impactful. Reforms to the Sentencing Code led to the Sentencing Act 2020, proposals around contempt of court rules in the digital age led to reforms in the Criminal Justice and Courts Act 2015, and discussion continues about how to respond to proposals stemming from reports around misconduct in public office, offences against the person and insanity defences. In relation to the Sentencing Code, parliamentarians have described Ormerod as the "principal driver", and the work "extraordinary", "exceptional", the result of "brilliant imagination", and whose "work on this and other measures has been of singular importance in improving the quality of our criminal law".

Ormerod is widely acknowledged as a transformative force in English law. During the passage of the Domestic Abuse Act 2021, upon accepting amendments concerning strangulation and suffocation advised upon by Ormerod, the Government, through then-minister David Wolfson, Baron Wolfson of Tredegar, noted that this was "not the first time, and will not be the last, that [Ormerod] has contributed significantly to the criminal law of this country".
