= Re Sigma Finance Corp =

UK legal case

- Court: Supreme Court of the United Kingdom
- Full case name: In Re Sigma Finance Corporation (in administrative receivership)
- Argued: 1–2 July 2009
- Decided: 29 October 2009
- Neutral citation: [2009] UKSC 2
- Reported at: [2010] 1 All ER 571

Case history
- Prior history: [2008] EWCA Civ 1303 (Reversed)

Holding
- By 4:1 that the interpretation of a clause of a trust deed should be made in the context of the document as a whole, not in isolation

Case opinions
- Majority: Lords Mance and Collins (Lords Hope and Scott in general concurrence)
- Dissent: Lord Walker

Area of law
- Trusts, Insolvency, Contract

Re Sigma Finance Corporation [2009] UKSC 2 is an English contract law case and the first substantive decision in the Supreme Court of the United Kingdom concerning principles of interpretation. Lord Walker said although he "was one of those who gave permission for a further appeal (as it then was, to the Appellate Committee of the House of Lords) I find, on closer consideration, that the case involves no issue of general public importance."

== Facts ==
Sigma Finance Corporation (Sigma) was a limited purpose finance company (similar but different from a structured investment vehicle (SIV)) established to invest in certain types of asset-backed securities and other financial instruments, and aimed to profit from the difference between the cost of funding its activities and the returns made on its investment portfolio. Its activities were much like a very simplified form of banking, although with less than half the leverage of a traditional bank and without any exposure to interest rate or foreign currency exchange rate risk. However, due to the impact on the financial markets stemming from the sub-prime mortgage market in the United States of America, on the value of asset backed securities generally, despite Sigma having no exposure to US subprime mortgages, there was a "run" by short term lenders to all non-banks. This resulted in forced selling by many investors at the same time causing the value of Sigma's assets to fall short of the amount it needed to pay the secured creditors. Following an auction in December 2008 the values achieved fell far short of the amounts required to satisfy the secured creditors, let alone the unsecured creditors. All of Sigma's assets were secured under a security trust deed (STD) in favour of those creditors investing in and through Sigma.

The STD provided that in such an event there should be a 60-day realisation period during which the trustees should use Sigma's assets to create, as far as possible, two pools of funds relating to its short- and long-term liabilities. However, the final sentence in Clause 7.6 of the STD also provided that, "During the Realisation Period the Security Trustee shall so far as possible discharge on the due dates realisable or maturing Assets of the Issuer."

Various classes of creditors, both secured and unsecured, brought actions against Sigma and a dispute arose as to the correct application of the STD given that Sigma has insufficient funds to satisfy all of its creditors and had failed to meet a margin call. Certain creditors argued that the clause required Sigma's receivers to allocate assets to its short-term liabilities pari passu i.e. equally and without preference; other creditors argued that a 'pay as you go' approach should be adopted with assets allocated according to the dates on which liabilities fell due, starting with the earliest.

== Judgment ==
=== High Court ===
An application was made under Section 35 of the Insolvency Act 1986 asking for directions from the court as to how to progress.

Mr Justice Sales held that the natural meaning of Clause 7.6 was that assets were to be distributed according to the dates when the relevant debts became due within the realisation period i.e. that the 'pay as you go' approach was the correct one.

=== Court of Appeal ===
By a majority of two to one (Lord Justice Lloyd and Lord Justice Rimer in the majority; Lord Neuberger dissenting), the Court of Appeal upheld the decision of Mr Justice Sales and dismissed the appeals.

=== Supreme Court ===
By a majority of four to one, the Supreme Court allowed the appeal. The judgment of the majority (comprising Lords Mance, Hope, Scott and Collins) was given by Lord Mance with a further, brief judgment, given by Lord Collins. Lord Walker dissented.

The leading judgment was given by Lord Mance, with whom Lords Hope, Scott and Collins concurred. The principles upon which the court should interpret such a document were held to be well-established and clear. The court should look at the document as a whole rather than focus on a single phrase, including any background information which would have been available to the parties at the time the contract was agreed. Applying this principle, it was held that the court should look not at the final sentence in Clause 7.6 in isolation but at the context in which the sentenced appeared and at the scheme of the STD as a whole. Clause 7.6 appeared in the STD in the context of an assumption of a situation in which Sigma had enough assets to cover at least its secured creditors, not a situation requiring the application of priorities between creditors. The final sentence of Clause 7.6, it was held, was not intended to prioritise creditors whose debts fell due during the realisation period over other creditors. It was also held to be improbable that commercial parties would contemplate that priority would be conferred to some creditors over others by the fortuitous timing of whose debts fell due during the realisation period. Clause 7.6 was an ancillary provision which did not override the trustee's absolute discretion as to how assets were to be realised. The reasonable person's understanding of Clause 7.6 was aided by a clear basic scheme that debts arising during the realisation period were to be part of the short term pool of creditors with the assets to be distributed equally amongst all the creditors at the discretion of the trustee i.e. pari passu.

A further judgment was given by Lord Collins, with whom Lords Hope and Mance concurred. Lord Collins, in his brief judgment, offered further thoughts on the approach to interpretation. He warned against over-literal interpretation of one provision of a document without regard to the whole as risking distortion or frustration of a commercial purpose. Such an approach, which may be appropriate in interpreting tax legislation, was inappropriate in a commercial context. Detailed semantic analysis had to give way to business common sense.

Lord Walker, dissenting, argued that the case involved no issue of general public importance. The principles of construction to be applied were clear and were neatly summarised in Lord Mance's judgment. Lord Walker preferred the view taken by the majority of the Court of appeal. However arbitrary or fortuitous it might appear to the court that priority would be given to creditors whose debts fell due during the realisation period, that was nonetheless the effect of the deed and the court should not make a new contract for experienced commercial operators as advised by expert lawyers.

== See also ==
- English contract law
- English property law
- 2009 Judgments of the Supreme Court of the United Kingdom
