= Blackstone's Criminal Practice =

Manual of procedure for criminal lawyers in England and Wales

- First edition, 1991
- Author: David Ormerod KC and David Perry KC
- Language: English
- Subject: Law
- Genre: Non-fiction
- Publisher: Oxford University Press
- Publication date: 1991
- Publication place: United Kingdom

Blackstone's Criminal Practice is a book about English criminal law. The First Edition was published by Blackstone Press in 1991. The Twelfth Edition (2002) was published by Oxford University Press as "A Blackstone Press Book". The Thirty-sixth Edition (2026) was published by Oxford University Press in 2025. The editor-in-chief of the first seventeen editions (1991 to 2007) was Peter Murphy. The general editors of the Eighteenth to Twenty-fourth editions (2008 to 2014) were Sir Anthony Hooper (who was Lord Justice Hooper until 2012) and David Ormerod. The editors in chief are Professor David Ormerod KC and David Perry KC.

It is one of the "main" books that lawyers practising on the criminal side use. The Crown Prosecution Service describe this book as a "standard source" and as a "recognised legal textbook", and say that the legal guidance given on their website is no substitute for a book such as this one. By 2002, it was the "leading" work for proceedings in the magistrates' courts. It was also described as one of the main or leading practitioner treatises by Tyrer and Lawton (2000), by Griffiths (2010), by Hannibal and Mountford and by Dyson and Meyer (2022). In 2016, the Judicial Executive Board selected Blackstone's Criminal Practice 2017 as the principal practitioner text for all criminal courts in England and Wales.

Blackstone's Criminal Practice was also published on CD-ROM.

== Editions ==
- Blackstone's Criminal Practice. 1st Edition. 1991. Reprinted twice 1991.
- Blackstone's Criminal Practice 1992. 2nd Edition. 1992.
- Blackstone's Criminal Practice 1993. 3rd Edition. 1993. Reprinted 1993.
- Blackstone's Criminal Practice 1994. 4th Edition. 1994.
- Blackstone's Criminal Practice 1995. 5th Edition. 1995.
- Blackstone's Criminal Practice 1996. 6th Edition. 1996.
- Blackstone's Criminal Practice 1997. 7th Edition. 1997.
- Blackstone's Criminal Practice 1998. 8th Edition. 1998.
- Blackstone's Criminal Practice 1999. 9th Edition. 1999.
- Blackstone's Criminal Practice 2000. 10th Edition. 2000.
- Blackstone's Criminal Practice 2001. 11th Edition. 2001.
- Blackstone's Criminal Practice 2002. 12th Edition. 2002.
- Blackstone's Criminal Practice 2003. 13th Edition. 2003.
- Blackstone's Criminal Practice 2004. 14th Edition. 2003.
- Blackstone's Criminal Practice 2005
- Blackstone's Criminal Practice 2006
- Blackstone's Criminal Practice 2007. 17th Edition. 2006.
- Blackstone's Criminal Practice 2008. 18th Edition. 2007.
- Blackstone's Criminal Practice 2009
- Blackstone's Criminal Practice 2010
- Blackstone's Criminal Practice 2011
- Blackstone's Criminal Practice 2012
- Blackstone's Criminal Practice 2013
- Blackstone's Criminal Practice 2014
- Blackstone's Criminal Practice 2015
- Blackstone's Criminal Practice 2016
- Blackstone's Criminal Practice 2017
- Blackstone's Criminal Practice 2018
- Blackstone's Criminal Practice 2019
- Blackstone's Criminal Practice 2020
- Blackstone's Criminal Practice 2021
- Blackstone's Criminal Practice 2022
- Blackstone's Criminal Practice 2023

== See also ==
- Bibliography of English criminal law
- Archbold Criminal Pleading, Evidence and Practice
