= R v Horncastle =

R v Horncastle (and others)
- Court: Supreme Court of the United Kingdom
- Full case name: R. v Horncastle (Michael Christopher), R. v Blackmore (David Lee), R. v Marquis (Abijah), R. v Graham (Joseph David)
- Argued: 7–9 July 2009
- Decided: 9 December 2009
- Neutral citation: [2009] UKSC 14
- Reported at: [2010] 2 AC 373, [2010] 2 WLR 47, [2010] 2 All ER 359

Case history
- Prior history: [2009] EWCA Crim 964 (Affirmed in full)

Holding
- Appeals dismissed, When hearsay evidence was adduced in a way which complied with the statutory regimes, there was no breach of Article 6, notwithstanding that the evidence was the "sole or decisive" basis of a conviction.

Case opinions
- Majority: Lord Phillips (Lady Hale and Lords Brown, Mance, Neuberger, Kerr and Judge concurring)

Area of law
- Human Rights, Criminal Evidence

R v Horncastle & Others [2009] UKSC 14 was a decision of the Supreme Court of the United Kingdom regarding hearsay evidence and the compatibility of English hearsay law with the right to a fair trial under Article 6 of the European Convention on Human Rights (ECHR). The case represents another stage in the judicial dialogue between the European Court of Human Rights (ECtHR) and the higher courts of the United Kingdom about whether it is acceptable to base convictions "solely or to a decisive extent" on evidence made by a witness who is identified but does not appear in court (for example, in a witness statement made to the police).

A panel of 7 judges sat in the case, including the President of the Supreme Court, Lord Phillips, the Lord Chief Justice, Lord Judge and the Master of the Rolls, Lord Neuberger. The court unanimously affirmed the decision of the Court of Appeal and dismissed the appeals of several defendants who were convicted on the basis of statements of absent witnesses.

The case can be viewed as a direct response to the European Court of Human Rights ruling in Al-Khawaja v United Kingdom (2009) 1 EHRR 49 in which the facts were legally very similar. In this case the ECtHR ruled against the state and found that while it was justifiable to allow hearsay evidence in some circumstances, it was likely never permissible for a conviction to be based solely or decisively on such evidence. Al-Khawaja has been appealed by the United Kingdom and the decision by the Grand Chamber (a larger panel of judges which did not overturn the initial decision) is available. The Lords in Horncastle do not look favourably upon the decision of the Grand Chamber stating "that although the domestic court was required to take account of the jurisprudence of the European Court of Human Rights in applying principles which were clearly established, where, on rare occasions, the domestic court was concerned that the European court's decision insufficiently appreciated or accommodated particular aspects of the domestic process, it might decline to follow the decision".

== Background ==
Article 6 of the European Convention on Human Rights guarantees a fair trial to anybody charged with a criminal offence. As a subset of this general right, accused persons are entitled to benefit from a number of "minimum rights", one of which under Article 6(3)(d) is the right to cross-examine prosecution witnesses.

Previous cases in the European Court of Human Rights such as Lucà v Italy and Kostovski v Netherlands concerned trials in which either the testimony of anonymous witnesses or witness statements made by witnesses who were not called in court were accepted as evidence. The European Court accepted that while allowing this sort of evidence did prima facie breach a defendant's rights under Article 6(3)(d), this was acceptable so long as sufficient counterbalances were present. The court maintained the caveat that although this sort of evidence was normally acceptable, it was never appropriate for a conviction to be based solely or decisively on this sort of untested evidence.

In Al-Khawaja v United Kingdom (2009) 49 EHRR 1, two applications to the ECtHR were made by men who had been convicted on criminal charges on the basis of untested hearsay statements. In one case a defendant was convicted of indecent assault on the basis of the statement of a woman who had subsequently committed suicide, in the other a defendant was convicted of wounding with intent (contrary to section 18 of the Offences against the Person Act 1861) on the basis of a statement made by the victim, who had been unwilling to testify in court. The ECtHR found that in both cases the state was in breach of Article 6 by allowing convictions to be based "solely or decisively" on hearsay evidence.

== Facts ==
Two of the Appellants had been convicted of committing grievous bodily harm with intent. Their convictions were based "to a decisive extent" on a statement made by the victim of the alleged offence, who had later died (the cause of his death was "not attributable to the injuries" he suffered). The other appellants were convicted of kidnapping, in this case their conviction was found to have been based "to a decisive extent" on a statement made by the victim who had not attended the trial due to fear.

Under the Criminal Justice Act 2003, it was permissible for the trial judges in each case to allow this evidence to be presented in this way. The Act provided for a general presumption that hearsay evidence should not be allowed in criminal trials but this presumption could be defeated when witnesses were unavailable due to one of a number of prescribed reasons (including the witness having died before the trial under section 116(2)(a) or the witness being unavailable for trial due to fear under section 116(2)(e).

The Act also provided a number of safeguards and exceptions which allowed judges to exclude unsafe or unfair hearsay evidence, permitted opposing counsel additional grounds to attack the credibility of absent witnesses and gave the judge a discretionary power to stop the case if the prosecution's case was based to any extent on hearsay evidence and was not convincing. The Act did not make any mention of the evidence of absent witnesses which was the "sole or decisive" basis of a conviction, (although this rule is one of the criteria which must be considered by a judge when determining if a witness should be allowed anonymity).

In the Court of Appeal (Criminal Division) an augmented panel of five judges unanimously affirmed the convictions of the appellants, declining to follow the "sole or decisive" rule found in the ECtHR cases and expressing support for the code of statutory provisions on hearsay contained within sections 114 to 136 of the Criminal Justice Act 2003. Their reasons were often similar to those in the Supreme Court, and in his judgment Lord Phillips expressed approval of the Court of Appeal's reasoning and stated that the two rulings were best read as a whole.

== Judgment ==
Arguments were made in the House of Lords between the 7 and 9 July 2009. Senior Counsel were Tim Owen QC and Shaun Smith QC for the two sets of appellants and David Perry QC for the Crown in response. An extended panel of 7 Justices heard the case, which is common practice when a case raises important human rights issues.

On 9 December 2009, the Court ruled unanimously in favour of the crown and dismissed the appeals. The Court's President Lord Phillips gave the leading judgment, with which the rest of the court agreed, although Lord Brown added some brief comments and Lord Mance prepared an annex detailing the history of similar cases in the ECtHR.

The court began by asserting that it was not bound by the ECtHR precedent. It confirmed that under section 2 of the Human Rights Act 1998 it was required to "take into account" Strasbourg cases and this meant that on rare occasions, they did not need to be followed.

Lord Phillips then set out his reasons for dismissing the appeal. His reasoning centred around the ECtHR's perceived failure to accommodate English law, both in terms of a failure to appreciate the strengths of the common law tradition with regard to criminal evidence and those of the current law which "render the sole or decisive rule unnecessary".

The court felt that it was significant that English law had long incorporated safeguards against untested, hearsay evidence and this had ensured that the rights encompassed by article 6(3)(d) had long been protected by English law. The system in England was compared to that of France at the time of the convention's creation. In this system, and other continental criminal procedures, a formal inquisitorial process was conducted by a judge before the trial itself, which lacked, according to Lord Phillips, many of the constituent rights attached to the concept of a fair trial, for example a lack of rules of evidence and the interrogation of witnesses in the absence of the defendant. It was suggested that the purpose of the rights codified in article 6 was to prevent this type of conduct, and was not designed to have a major effect on common law systems.

The current statutory regime enacted by the Criminal Justice Act 2003 was also praised as a "crafted code" which ensured that hearsay evidence was properly admitted. It was noted that the current system was heavily influenced by the Law Commission and by consultation with experts. It was suggested that to introduce the "sole or decisive rule" without discussion or consideration would damage this code.

The court also noted that the rule would create practical difficulties in the criminal system, and that it was virtually always the case that English law did exclude evidence that fell within the "sole or decisive rule".

Another observation made was that the rule is paradoxical; it results in spurious or weak hearsay evidence which would not result in a conviction alone being admitted, while stronger, damning evidence which is likely to achieve a conviction even in the absence of further evidence being excluded. It was suggested that this approach did not make sense, and that good systems tend to exclude weak, not strong evidence.

== See also ==
- 2009 Judgments of the Supreme Court of the United Kingdom
- Hearsay in English Law
