= West v Secretary of State for Scotland =

- Court: Inner House
- Decided: 23 April 1992
- Citation: 1992 CSIH 3, 1992 SC 385, 1992 SCLR 504, 1992 SLT 636

Court membership
- Judges sitting: Lord President (Hope), Lord Cowie, Lord Mayfield

Keywords
- Judicial review, Supervisory jurisdiction

West v Secretary of State for Scotland 1992 SC 385 is a Scots administration law case dealing with judicial review. In its decision, the Inner House laid down the defining principles of judicial review in Scotland and the test for invoking the Court of Session's jurisdiction.

== Background ==
West was a prison officer at HM Young Offenders Institution, Polmont. In 1989, he was compulsorily transferred to HM Prison, Edinburgh. He complained that he had been told by the Scottish Home and Health Department that his moving expenses would be paid by that department. But they were not paid. The department, represented by Secretary of State for Scotland argued that the terms of West's employment were such that he was to be mobile, and that West was a Crown employee, the department had a discretion to decide whether any moving expenses should be paid.

== Judgment ==
The Court of Session held that does not require that the decision complained should have any public law element in order to be reviewable:

… the Court of Session has power, in the exercise of its supervisory jurisdiction, to regulate the process by which decisions are taken by any person or body to whom a jurisdiction, power or authority has been delegated or entrusted by statute, agreement or any other instrument

The public or private nature of the inferior body or tribunal is not decisive, nor is it necessary to enquire whether the decision of the inferior body or tribunal is administrative in character. The essential point is that a decision-making function has been entrusted to that body or tribunal which it can be compelled by the court to perform… The essential feature of all these cases is the conferring, whether by statute or private contract, of a decision-making power or duty on a third party to whom the taking of the decision is entrusted but whose manner of decision-making may be controlled by the court.

[per Lord President Hope at page 650, emphasis added].

Crucially, in Scots administrative law the competency of an application to the supervisory jurisdiction

… does not depend upon any distinction between public law and private law, nor is it confined to those cases which English law has accepted as amenable to judicial review...

== Significance ==
The law of Scotland is different from the law of England on this matter: see, for England, R v Chief Rabbi of the United Hebrew Congregations of Great Britain ex parte Wachmann in which Simon Brown J held that a decision of the Chief Rabbi to terminate a rabbi's employment was not reviewable: to attract the court's supervisory jurisdiction, there must be ‘not merely a public but potentially a governmental interest in the decision-making power in question.’ [at page 1046, emphasis added].

== See also ==
- UK constitutional law
- UK administrative law
