= Ian Dennis (academic lawyer) =

Ian Dennis is Professor of English Law at the University College London Law Faculty and Director of the Centre for Criminal Law. Dennis was educated at Manchester Grammar School and Queens' College, Cambridge. He joined the Faculty in 1974, becoming a Reader in 1982, and a Professor in 1987. He was called to the bar in 1971 at Gray's Inn.

His areas of expertise include comparative criminal law, criminal evidence, and criminal procedure.

== Publications ==
- Codification of the Criminal Law, a Report to the Law Commission (with J C Smith and E J Griew, 1985).
- The Law of Evidence (Sweet & Maxwell, 4th Ed, 2010)
