= David Lanham =

English legal scholar who became a leading figure in Australian criminal law

Professor David Lanham
- Education: University of Leeds, University of Oxford
- Occupation: Legal scholar
- Organization(s): University of Nottingham and University of Melbourne
- Known for: Criminal law
- Notable work: The Criminal Law Review

David Lanham is an English legal scholar who became a leading figure in Australian criminal law. He is Emeritus Professor of Law at the University of Melbourne and is known for his extensive scholarship on criminal responsibility, complicity, causation, homicide, cross-border criminal law, and administrative law.

== Early life and career in England ==
Lanham read for a LLB at the University of Leeds and the BCL at the University of Oxford. He was called to the bar by Lincoln's Inn.

He was appointed Senior Lecturer in Law at the University of Nottingham, where he taught and wrote widely on criminal law and legal doctrine. Between 1973 and 1975, he served as editor of The Criminal Law Review, one of the principal specialist journals in English criminal law.

== Academic career in Australia ==
Lanham relocated to Australia in 1975 to take up the position of Kenneth Bailey Professor of Law at the Melbourne Law School, the premier chair in public law and legal theory at the University of Melbourne. He held the position until his retirement, after which he was appointed Emeritus Professor of Law.

His scholarship in Australia addressed a wide range of criminal law subjects, including:

- homicide and partial defences;
- causation in criminal law;
- complicity and participation;
- cross-border criminal liability;
- weapons offences and self-defence;
- sentencing and cross-border conviction issues.

== Selected publications ==
=== Books ===
- Criminal laws in Australia (2006).
- Cross-Border Criminal Law (1997).
- Taming Death by Law (1993).
- Criminal Fraud (1987).
- General Principles of Administrative Law (1979, 1984, 1989) (1st-3rd edns).
- Study Guide to Criminal Law (1967).

=== Chapters ===
- Principles of causation in criminal law (2017 and first published in 2002) in Causation in Law and Medicine (1st ed.).

=== Selected journal articles ===
- Offensive weapons and self-defence (2005) Criminal Law Review (Feb) 85–97.
- Sentencing and prior cross border convictions (2003) 27 Criminal Law Journal, 23-31.
- Witness Credibility and Cross-Border Convictions (2002) 26 Criminal Law Journal, 272-278.
- Crime and Conflicting Duties Across Borders (2001) 25 Criminal Law Journal, 19-27.
- Obtaining Evidence and Conflicting Obligations (2001) 25 Criminal Law Journal, 247-259.
- Primary and derivative criminal liability: an Australian perspective (2000) Criminal Law Review (Sep) 707–718.
- Australian Perspectives on Crimes with Diminished Fault Elements (1999) 5 Global Journal of Crime and Criminal Law 91–107.
- A Tale of Two Attempt Laws (1999) 5 Global Journal of Crime and Criminal Law, 109-129.A Tale of Two Attempt Laws (1999) 5 Global Journal of Crime and Criminal Law 109–129.
- Danger down under (1999) Criminal Law Review (Dec) 960–969. Danger down under (1999) Criminal Law Review (Dec) 960–969.
- Injury, Consent and Public Policy (1999) 5 Global Journal of Crime and Criminal Law 7–18.
- Another Look at Vicarious Liability (1999) 5 Global Journal of Crime and Criminal Law 8–17.
- Criminal Liability of Corporations (1999) 5 Global Journal of Crime and Criminal Law 19–46.
- Withdrawal of Artificial Feeding from Patients in a Persistent Vegetative State (1994) 6(1) Current Issues in Criminal Justice 135-142.
- Involuntary acts and the actus reus (1993) 17(2) Criminal Law Journal 97–101.
- Refusal by agents of life-sustaining medical treatment (1992) 18(3) Melbourne University Law Review 659–675.
- Living wills and the right to die with dignity (1991) 18(2) Melbourne University Law Review 329–349.
- The right to choose to die with dignity (1990) 14(6) Criminal Law Journal 401–430.
- Three cases of accessorial absurdity? (1990) 53(1) Modern Law Review 75–77.
- Death of a qualified defence? (1988) 104(Apr) Law Quarterly Review 239–249.
- Provocation and the requirement of presence (1989) 13(2) Criminal Law Journal 133–150.
- Informal extradition in Australian law (1987) 11(1) Criminal Law Journal 3–10.
- Restitution orders (1986) 10(6) Criminal Law Journal 394–410.
- Criminal fraud and compensation orders (1986) 10(5) Criminal Law Journal 297–318.
- Wilful blindness and the criminal law (1985) 9(5) Criminal Law Journal 261–269.
- Delegation, legislation and dispensation (1984) 14(4) Melbourne University Law Review 634–659.
- Hale; misogyny and rape (1983) 7(3) Criminal Law Journal 148–166.
- Felony murder - ancient and modern (1983) 7(2) Criminal Law Journal 90–101.
- Drivers, Control and Accomplices (1982) Criminal Law Review 419.
- Accomplices and Withdrawal (1981) 97 Law Quarterly Review 575.
- Accomplices and Transferred Malice (1980) 96 Law Quarterly Review 110.
- Murder by Instigating Suicide (1980) Criminal Law Review 215.
- Accomplices, principals and causation (1980) 12(4) Melbourne University Law Review 490–515.
- Complicity, concert and conspiracy (1980) 4(5) Criminal Law Journal 276–295.
- Accomplices and constructive liability (1980) 4(2) Criminal Law Journal 78–95.
- Self-defence, prevention of crime, arrest and the duty to retreat (1979) 3(4) Criminal Law Journal 188–210.
- Murder, recklessness and grievous bodily harm (1978) 2(5) Criminal Law Journal 255–272.
- Killing the fleeing offender (1977) 1(1) Criminal Law Journal 16–24.
- Obtaining a financial advantage by deception in Victoria - the meaning of financial advantage (1977) 1(4) Criminal Law Journal 188–203.
- Larsonneur Revisited (1976: May) Criminal Law Review 276.
- Payments to Witnesses and Contempt of Court (1976) Criminal Law Review 144.
- Arresting the Insane (1974) Criminal Law Review 515.
- Arrest, Detention and Compulsion (1974) Criminal Law Review 288.
- Issue Estoppel in the English Criminal Law (1970) Criminal Law Review 428.
- Defence of Property in the Criminal Law (1966) Criminal Law Review 368, 426.

=== Conference Publications ===
- D. Lanham, 'Principles of Causation in Criminal Law' (paper presented at Deakin University Symposium on Causation in Law and Medicine, Melbourne, 26-28 November 1999).
