= Sharp v Thomson =

Sharp v Thomson 1997 SC(HL) 66 is a United Kingdom House of Lords decision regarding the status of an unrecorded disposition in Scots Property Law. The case was brought by Sharp as receivers for Albyn Construction Ltd, a building company who had sold a house in Aberdeen to the Thomsons, a brother and sister. Albyn had agreed to sell the house to the Thomsons leading to the completion of the missives and the delivery of the disposition and the payment of the purchase price. However, before the disposition was registered by the Thomsons, Albyn defaulted on a loan taken by them from the Bank of Scotland. The default lead to the attachment of a floating charge held by the bank over all of Albyn's "Property and Undertaking", and Sharp was appointed Receiver to collect this for the Bank.

Sharp raised an action before the Court of Session contesting that, since the disposition hadn't been registered, the ownership of the house remained with Albyn at the time of attachment and that it and the purchase price was available to the Bank as holder of the charge. The Thomsons responded that the act of delivering the disposition divulged Albyn of any "Beneficial Interest" in the house and that this was enough to remove it from the scope of the charge. The Inner House of the Court of Session found in favour of Sharp. In giving the leading opinion, The Lord President (Hope) drew on historical sources to argue that Scotland has, and has always had, a unitary system of property law and that ownership could only lie with the holder of the recorded title. As the Thomsons had not recorded the disposition, title remained with Albyn and so the house was available to Sharp.

The Thomsons appealed to the House of Lords. The Court overruled the Inner House and found in favour of the Thomsons. The House gave two main reasons for its decision. Lord Jauncey upheld the Thomsons' argument that, because in delivering the disposition, Albyn could no longer make use of or sell the house, it had no "Beneficial Interest" in the house and this was enough to remove it from being part of its property. Lord Jauncey commented that the ability to sell the house in fraud of the disposition did not amount to a right in property. Lord Clyde offered different reasoning. He said that the term "Property and Undertaking" used in the Charge Agreement and the legislation had to be construed in its context. He said the Court of Session was wrong to ascribe it a technical meaning. He said that a proper construction of the term was to include only what the company could make use of in its day-to-day business dealings and not all its property in a strict legal sense.

The case caused great confusion in Scottish Conveyancers and academics who saw it as over-turning the long established Scots law principle that ownership could not be divided. However, the effect of the case was greatly reduced by the House of Lords in 2004 in Burnett's Trustee v Grainger [2004] UKHL 8 where the Court held that Sharp v Thomson was authority only for holders of floating charges. For all other sales of property where the seller goes bankrupt or into sequestration, the rule that applies is that owner is the holder of the registered title.
