= John Cameron, Lord Cameron =

Scottish judge (1900–1996)

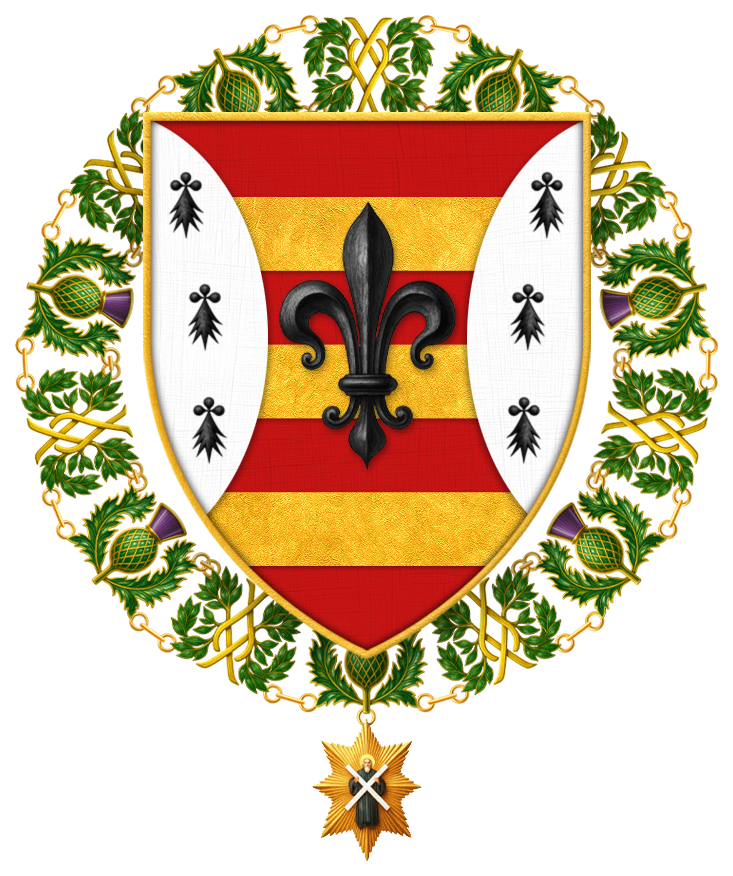
Shield of Arms of John Cameron, Lord Cameron, KT, DSC, PRSE, FBA

John Cameron, Lord Cameron, KT, DSC, PRSE, FBA (8 February 1900 – 30 May 1996) was a Scottish judge and President of the Royal Society of Edinburgh from 1973 to 1976.

== Life ==
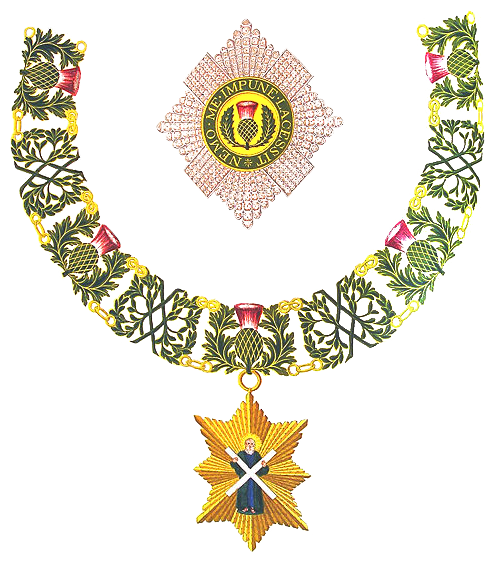
Insignia of a Knight of the Order of the Thistle, which Lord Cameron became in 1978

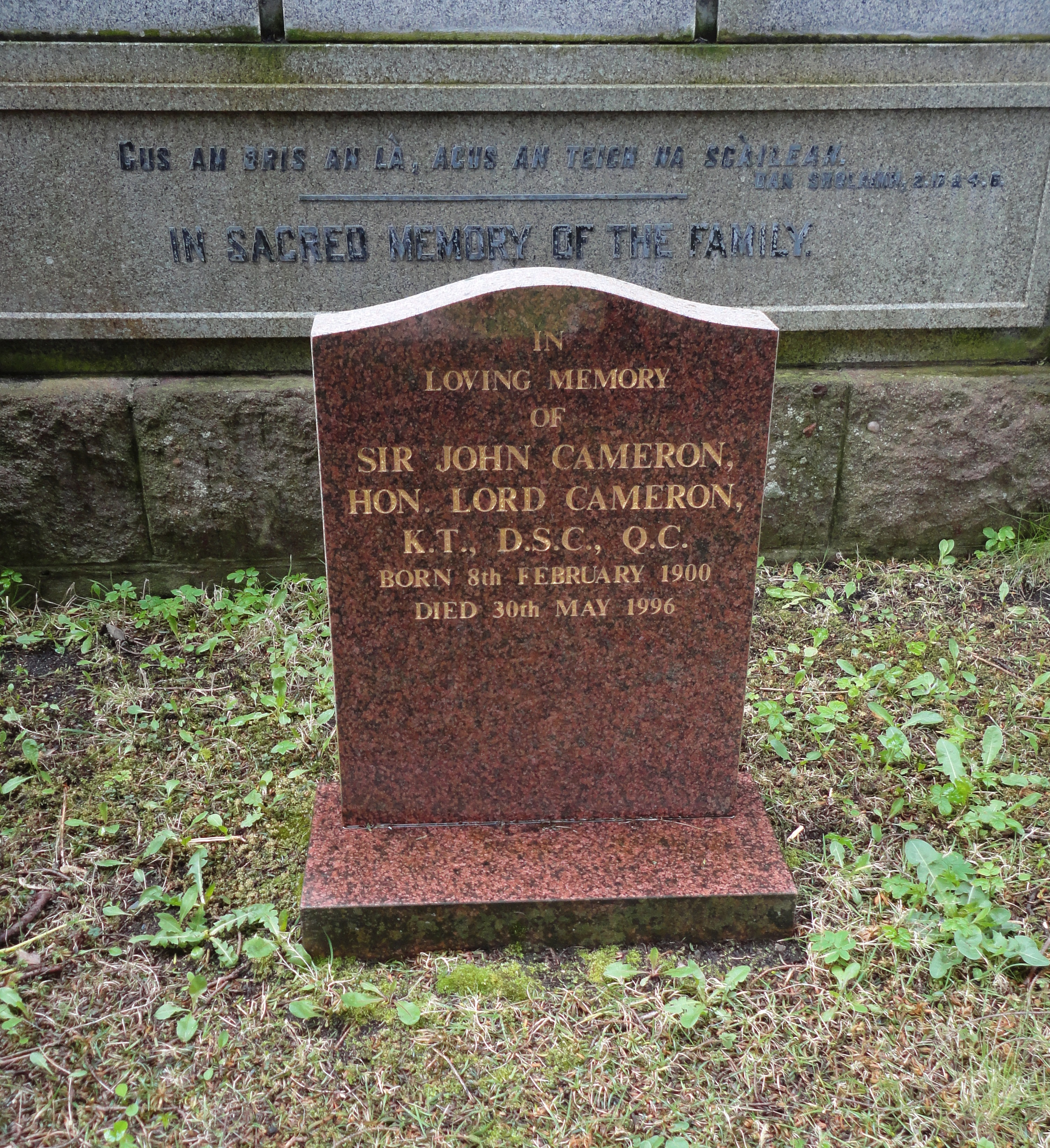
Ullapool, Mill Street Old Burial Ground: Grave of Lord Cameron KT DSC

Cameron was born in London, the son of John Cameron SSC NP, a solicitor from Edinburgh. The family lived at 13 South Charlotte Street just off Charlotte Square.

He attended Edinburgh Academy from 1910 to 1917. He then studied law at the University of Edinburgh. This was interrupted by the First World War during which he served as a midshipman in the Royal Naval Volunteer Reserve. He resumed his studies after the war and qualified as an advocate in 1924. In 1936 he rose to be King's Counsel. In the Second World War he returned to the RNVR, this time as a lieutenant-commander, and participated both in the evacuation at Dunkirk and the D-Day landings.

In 1945 he was made Sheriff of Inverness and served in this role until 1948. He returned to Edinburgh in 1948 to serve as Dean of the Faculty of Advocates. He was knighted in the 1954 Queen's Birthday Honours List and elected a Senator of the College of Justice on 5 July 1955. All Senators of the College (which includes the Supreme Courts of Scotland) have the honorific, The Honourable, and use the title Lord or Lady along with a surname or a territorial name.

In March 1969, the O'Neill ministry appointed Cameron chairman of a commission into the causes of "the violence and civil disturbance in Northern Ireland on and since 5th October 1968", whose other members were Professor Sir John Biggart, C.B.E. and James Joseph Campbell, M.A., Head of the Education Department at St. Joseph's College of Education, which trained male Catholic teachers, and Director of the Institute of Education at Queen's University Belfast. Campbell was also the author of Orange Terror: The Real Case Against Partition (1943) by Ultach (Ulsterman). The resulting "Cameron Report", titled Disturbances in Northern Ireland, was published in September 1969.

Lord Cameron continued as Senator of the College of Justice until 1985. He was elected a Fellow of the Royal Society of Edinburgh in 1949. He became their Vice-President in 1970 and President in 1973. In 1955 he became chairman of the influential conservationist organisation the Cockburn Association, retaining this position until 1968.

Lord Cameron, who had been awarded the Distinguished Service Cross as a naval officer, was also appointed a Knight of the Order of the Thistle in 1978.

He died in Edinburgh on 30 May 1996, aged 96.

== Family ==
He married twice, firstly in 1927 to Eileen Dorothea Burrell, then following her death in 1943 he remarried in 1944 to Iris Shepherd. His son Kenneth served as Lord Advocate from 1984 to 1989.

His youngest daughter, Katharine Lindsay Cameron, married David Bruce Weir, Lord Weir.
