= Peter Allsop (publisher) =

Legal publisher (1924–2010)

- Born: 22 August 1924
- Died: 4 May 2010 (aged 85)
- Education: Caius College, Cambridge
- Occupations: Legal Publisher, Barrister
- Organization(s): Sweet & Maxwell, Associated Book Publishers

Peter Allsop (22 August 1924 – 4 May 2010) was a barrister and a leading legal publisher. He served as a senior editor at Sweet & Maxwell before becoming its managing director, later taking on the roles of managing director and chairman of Associated Book Publishers.

== Life ==
Allsop was educated at Haileybury and Caius College, Cambridge, and was called to the bar in 1948 at Lincoln’s Inn.

He joined Sweet & Maxwell as an editor in 1950, taking responsibility for several publications. Notably, he was co-founding editor of The Criminal Law Review with John Burke.

Allsop became managing director of Sweet & Maxwell in 1965. The company joined the holding group Associated Book Publishers Limited (APB) in 1968, and he was appointed managing director of the group and later its chairman in 1976. In 1974 he edited ’Then and now: 1799 - 1974; commemorating 175 years of law bookselling and publishing’, a collection of essays celebrating 175 years of the company.

He served as chairman of the Book Trade Benevolent Society (now known as the Book Trade Charity) early in his career and as President of the Publishers Association from 1975 to 1977. In 1978 he led a delegation to the Soviet Union to develop relationships with Soviet publishers, and in 1982 he served as chairman of the organising committee for the UNESCO World Congress on Books in London.

ABP was acquired by the Thomson Corporation in 1987. Allsop later worked as a consultant and as a board member of other publishers.

Allsop was honoured by becoming a bencher of Lincoln's Inn.
