= In re B (A Child) (2009 ruling) =

Re B (a child)
- Court: Supreme Court of the United Kingdom
- Full case name: In re B (A Child) (2009)
- Argued: 14 October 2009
- Decided: 19 November 2009
- Neutral citation: [2009] UKSC 5
- Reported at: [2009] 1 WLR 2496, [2010] 1 All ER 223

Case history
- Prior history: [2009] EWCA Civ 545

Holding
- Appeal allowed The Family Court had not exceeded its discretion in finding for the reasons it did, the Court of Appeal erred by trying to derive a general principle regarding birth parents from Re G.

Case opinions
- Majority: Lord Kerr (Lords Hope, Collins & Clarke & Lady Hale concurring)

Area of law
- Family Law, Residence Orders

In re B (A Child) [2009] UKSC 5 was a 2009 ruling by the United Kingdom Supreme Court case concerning child welfare, family law and the correct weighting of factors to be considered by a Family Court in making a residence order. The case was the first substantive appeal to be heard in the new Supreme Court.

The case concerned a child whose parents had separated shortly before birth. The child had been raised from birth by his grandmother, with fortnightly visits to each parent. Shortly after the child's third birthday, an application by his father was heard in the Family Proceedings Court. The father sought a residence order for the child, and he was supported by the child's mother in this application. The Family Court dismissed this application, on the advice of a social care manager, holding that there were no 'compelling reasons to disrupt [the boy's] continuity of care'.

The parents appealed to the High Court who overturned the decision, describing the previous court as having been 'distracted' by the continuity of the boy's grandmothers care for him, which was ultimately not of paramount importance.

The grandmother then appealed to the Court of Appeal who agreed with the High Court, asserting that the Family Court had over-emphasised the importance of the status quo and should have given consideration to the general assumption that it is in a child's best interests to reside with their biological parents (a principle which was stated to have derived from Re G (a child) [2006] UKHL 43).

The case was then appealed to the Supreme Court. The Court unanimously overruled the decisions of the High Court and Court of Appeal and affirmed the original decision of the Family Court. Lord Kerr gave the leading judgment, holding that the Court of Appeal had made significant errors in its interpretation of Re G, which when viewed as a whole, did not introduce any general principle about the consideration to be given to biological relationships.

== See also ==
- 2009 Judgments of the Supreme Court of the United Kingdom
