= Brian Hogan (legal scholar) =

British legal scholar (1922–2003)

Professor Brian Hogan
- Born: 4 May 1932
- Died: 9 February 1996 (aged 63)
- Education: University of Manchester
- Occupations: Legal scholar, Barrister (Gray's Inn)
- Organization: University of Leeds
- Known for: Criminal law
- Notable work: Smith and Hogan's Criminal Law

Brian Hogan (4 May 1932 – 9 February 1996) was an English legal academic and Professor of criminal law at the University of Leeds from 1967-94. Together with Professor Sir John C. Smith, he wrote Smith and Hogan's Criminal Law.

== Early life and education ==
Hogan was born the son of a police officer in the North East. Graduating with first-class honours in law from Manchester in 1956 (after completing his National Service), he took up a post as a temporary assistant lecturer at the University of Nottingham. He was called to the Bar (Gray’s Inn) in 1959.

== Academic career ==
Hogan remained at the University of Nottingham until 1967, contributing to the development of its law programme and early scholarship in criminal law.

In 1967 he was appointed to the chair of Common Law at the University of Leeds, where he served until his retirement in 1994. He acted as Head of the Department of Law on three occasions and also served as the University’s Pro-Vice-Chancellor during the 1980s. From 1974 to 1976, he chaired the Board of Arts, Economic and Social Studies and Law, and in 1987 he founded the Centre for Criminal Justice Studies. He is remembered with respect and affection by former students and is commemorated by a portrait in the Stanley and Audrey Burton Gallery.

From 1966 to 1972, Hogan was editor of the leading specialist journal the Criminal Law Review.

Together with Sir John Smith, he co-authored the first seven editions (1965–1992) of Smith and Hogan’s Criminal Law. The work became the pre-eminent doctrinal authority on criminal law in England and Wales.

== Selected works ==
=== Smith and Hogan's Criminal Law ===
- Smith, J. C.; Hogan, Brian (1965–1992). Criminal law (1st-7th ed.). London: Butterworths.
- Smith, John C.; Hogan, Brian (1975–1993). Criminal Law: Cases and Materials (1st-5th ed.). London: Butterworths.

=== Journal articles ===
- Victims as Parties to Crime [1962] Crim.L.R. 683
- Blackmail—Another View [1966] Crim.L.R. 474
- Malicious Damage—the Law Commission’s Working Paper [1969] Crim.L.R. 283
- Funeral in Dublin [1970] Crim.L.R. 452
- The Brodrick Report: 3) A Note on Death [1972] Crim.L.R. 80
- The Rise and Fall of Forgery [1974] Crim.L.R. 81
- The Killing Ground 1964–73 [1974] Crim.L.R. 387
- The Mental Element in Crime: (2) Strict Liability [1978] Crim.L.R. 593
- Non-Fatal Offences [1980] Crim.L.R. 542
- The Criminal Attempts Act and Attempting the Impossible [1984] Crim.L.R. 584
- The Dadson Principle [1989] Crim.L.R. 679
