= The Criminal Law Review =

Journal of criminal law in England and Wales

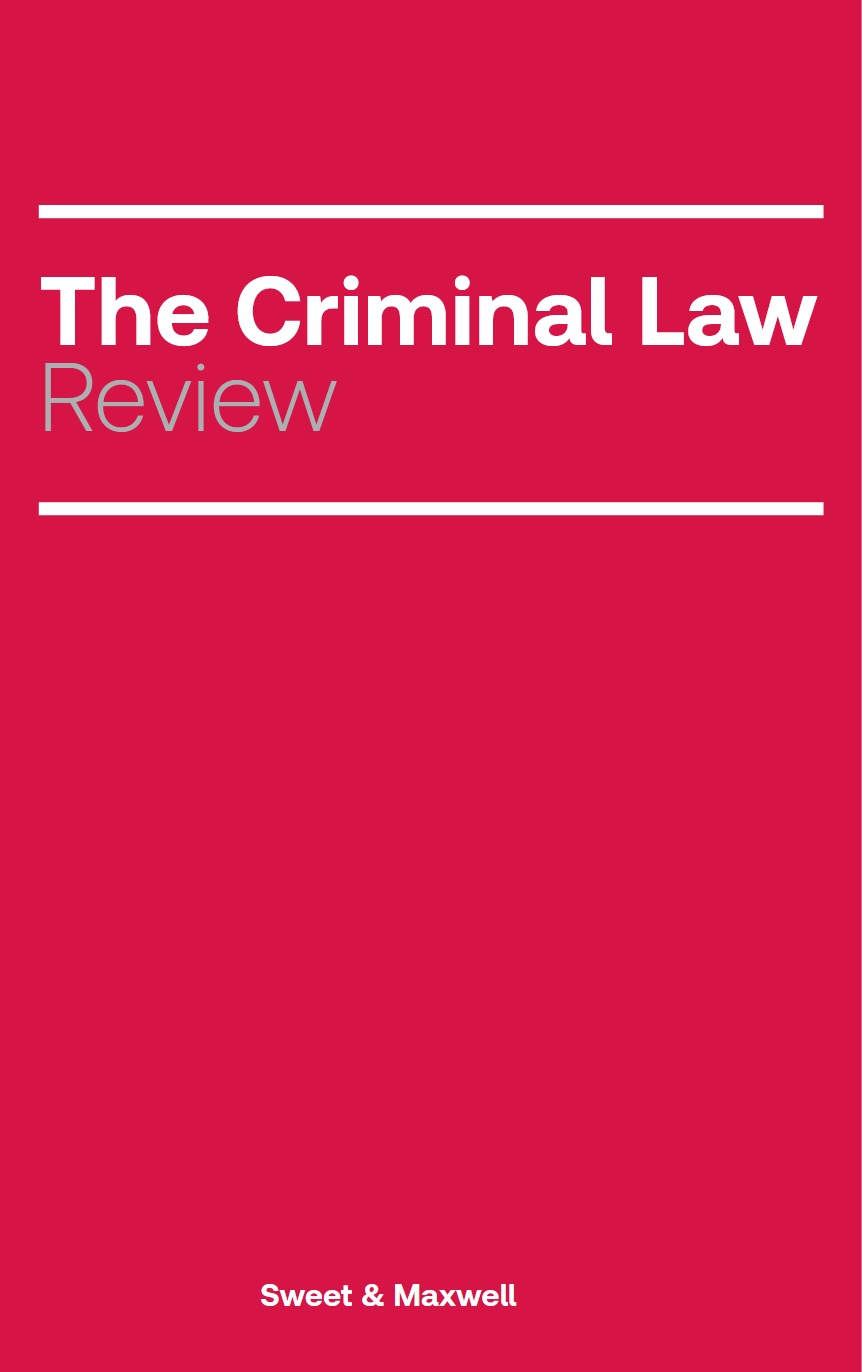
- Discipline: Criminal law of England and Wales
- Language: English
- Edited by: Hannah Quirk

Publication details
- History: Since 1954
- Publisher: Sweet & Maxwell (England and Wales)
- Frequency: Monthly

Standard abbreviations
- ISO 4: Crim. Law Rev.

Indexing
- ISSN: 0011-135X (print); 2754-1665 (web)
- LCCN: sf86007061
- OCLC no.: 880469267

Links
- Journal homepage

The Criminal Law Review is a peer-reviewed academic journal published by Sweet & Maxwell covering the full spectrum of criminal law and criminal justice, with a primary focus on the law of England and Wales. It is the leading journal of criminal law in England and Wales providing both scholarly analysis and practitioner updates. The journal holds significant influence in both academic and professional circles, and is curated to "keep criminal lawyers up to date with new developments in law and practice" while also advancing scholarly debate. The editor-in-chief is Hannah Quirk (King’s College London).

== History ==
The journal was established in January 1954. Its founding editors were John Burke and Peter Allsop.

=== Editors ===
The following persons are or have been editors-in-chief:

- Hannah Quirk (Since 2023)
- David Ormerod (2012–2023)
- Ian Dennis (1999–2011)
- Andrew Ashworth (1975–1998)
- David Lanham (1973-1975)
- Brian Hogan (1966-1973)
- Edward Griew (1964-1966)
- John Burke and Peter Allsop (1954-1964)

== Reception ==
The journal was reviewed by The Irish Law Times and Solicitors' Journal, Justice of the Peace and Local Government Review, The Solicitors' Journal, The British Journal of Delinquency, Queensland Justice of the Peace and Local Authorities' Journal and South African Law Journal.

The 1960 Special Issue on Violence was reviewed by The Solicitors Journal.

=== Abstracting and indexing ===
The journal is abstracted and indexed in EBSCO databases, ProQuest databases, and Scopus.

== See also ==
- Bibliography of English criminal law
- The Journal of Criminal Law
