= R (L) v Comr of Police of the Metropolis =

2009 UK legal case

R (L) v Metropolitan Police Commissioner
- Court: Supreme Court of the United Kingdom
- Full case name: R (on the application of L) v Commissioner of Police of the Metropolis
- Argued: 13–14 July 2009
- Decided: 29 October 2009
- Neutral citation: [2009] UKSC 3
- Reported at: [2010] 1 AC 410, [2009] 3 WLR 1056

Case history
- Prior history: [2007] EWCA Civ 168

Holding
- The police force were required to consider the implications to a person's private life before disclosing information to another body. However in this case, the information was relevant and the police had acted acceptably.

Case opinions
- Majority: Lords Hope (Lord Saville Concurring), Brown & Neuberger. Lord Scott finding for materially different reasons.

Area of law
- Human rights, respect for private life, police powers

R (on the application of L) v Commissioner of Police of the Metropolis [2009] UKSC 3, was a 2009 case heard by the Supreme Court of the United Kingdom.

== Facts ==
The appellant, L, obtained a job as a playground assistant. In connection with her employment, the police were required to provide her with an enhanced criminal records certificate (ECRC) in accordance with Section 115 of the Police Act 1997 (the 1997 Act).

ECRCs are issued by the Secretary of State, and Section 115(7) of the 1997 Act requires the chief officer of every relevant police force to provide any information which might be relevant in considering a person's suitability for a position and which ought to be included in the certificate.

In the ECRC, the police disclosed to the school that she had been accused of neglecting her child and non-cooperation with social services. As a consequence, her employment was terminated.

The appellant sought judicial review of the decision to disclose the information contained in the ECRC. This application was dismissed by the High Court in March 2006. She appealed to the Court of Appeal who dismissed the appeal in March 2007. She then appealed to the House of Lords (the body which was replaced by the Supreme Court in October 2009), claiming that the police disclosure violated her right to respect for her private life under the Human Rights Act 1998 (Article 8 of the European Convention on Human Rights).

== Judgment ==
The court unanimously dismissed the appeal. Lord Hope, with whom Lord Saville concurred, first looked at whether the issue raised was within the scope of Article 8 at all. He held that it was as:

(a) Respect for private life comprises, to a certain degree, the right to establish and develop relationships with other human beings. Excluding a person from employment in her chosen field is liable to affect her ability to develop relationships with others, and the problems that this creates with regards to the possibility of that person earning a living can have serious repercussions on the enjoyment of her private life. Dismissal could also damage her reputation and people are entitled to have their good name and reputation protected.

(b) Public information can fall into the scope of private life when it is systematically collected and stored in files held by the authorities.

(c) The relevant information in the case related to private proceedings.

Lord Hope concluded that the decisions which the chief officer of police is required to take under Section 115(7) of the 1997 Act are likely to fall within the scope of Article 8(1) in every case as the information which he would be considering has been stored in files held by the police. As such, its disclosure would be likely to affect the private life of the applicant in virtually every case.

Lord Hope then went on to determine whether the interference with her private life could be justified. In determining whether information should be provided, Section 115(7) provided for a two-stage test for the chief officer, the second of which was that the information "ought" to be included. Lord Hope determined that at this stage, the chief officer must consider whether there is likely to be an interference with the applicant's private life and, if so, whether it could be justified. Section 115(7) itself was not in contravention of Article 8 so long as it was interpreted and applied in a proportionate way. Those who apply for ECRCs do not consent to their privacy rights being violated; consent is given on the basis that the right to respect for their private life would be respected. Lord Hope concluded that the words "ought to be included" in Section 115(7) required greater attention by the police who had, so far, given priority to the social need to protect the vulnerable as opposed to the right to respect for private life of applicants. Neither consideration should be afforded precedence over the other; careful consideration was required so as to ensure that the interference with the private life of the applicant was outweighed by the risk of non-disclosure. In future, the words were to be read and given effect in a way that was compatible with the applicant's Convention right and that of any third parties who may be affected by the disclosure. Furthermore, in cases of doubt – i.e. where disclosure might be unnecessary, unreliable, or out-of-date – the applicant should be given the opportunity to make representations before the information is released.

On the facts of the case, however, Lord Hope concluded that the information that was disclosed was relevant for the purpose for which the ECRC was required. Insufficient weight was given to the appellant's right to respect for her private life when the decision to disclose was made, however, this did not change the fact that the risk to the children outweigh the prejudicial effect of disclosure.

Lord Scott concluded that the issue did not fall within the scope of Article 8, and that there had been no interference: the information was relevant to the employment position in question, and it had not been suggested that the compilation and retention by the police of the details in question constituted a breach of Article 8. On this basis, Lord Scott found it difficult to see on what basis her attack on the inclusion of the details in the certificate could succeed. Lord Scott emphasised the fact it was she who applied for the certificate, and, as such, invited the chief police officer to exercise his duty under Section 115(7). Lord Scott disagreed with Lord Hope's conclusion that applications for ECRCs are sought "only on the basis that their right to private life is respected", concluding that almost all information disclosed would be information about private life, and if it is relevant and reasonable to include it, there could be no objection to its inclusion.

Lord Brown agreed with the judgments of Lords Hope and Neuberger.

Lord Neuberger first looked at whether the operation of Section 115 of the 1997 Act fell within the reach of Article 8 and concluded that it did on for a number of reasons: first, the basis that ECRCs would often have a highly significant effect on the applicant and, if adverse, would effectively shut off forever all employment opportunities for the applicants in a large number of different fields. Second, to be excluded from a large sector of the job market would frequently have a significant effect on one's private life in terms of career satisfaction, development of personal relationships and the ability to earn a living. Third, an adverse ECRC would involve the release of information concerning the applicant which is stored on public records (regardless of the fact that some of it may be in the public domain). In the present case, some of the information in the ECRC was not publicly available and not even based on events which had taken place in public.

Lord Neuberger next looked at whether the applicant's Article 8 rights were infringed by Section 115 of the 1997 Act. Lord Neuberger concluded that were Section 115(7)(a) – that the information "might be relevant" for the purposes of Section 115(2) – the sole criterion for determining whether information be included in the ECRC then Article 8 would be infringed. However, given Section 115(7)(b) – which also requires that the information "ought to be included" – Article 8 was not infringed as this gives the opportunity for the balancing act required by Article 8 to be employed by the Chief Officer at this stage. He agreed with Lord Hope that the issue was essentially one of proportionality.

== See also ==
- 2009 Judgments of the Supreme Court of the United Kingdom
