= J & H Ritchie Ltd v Lloyd Ltd =

Scottish contract law case

J&H Ritchie Ltd v Lloyd Ltd
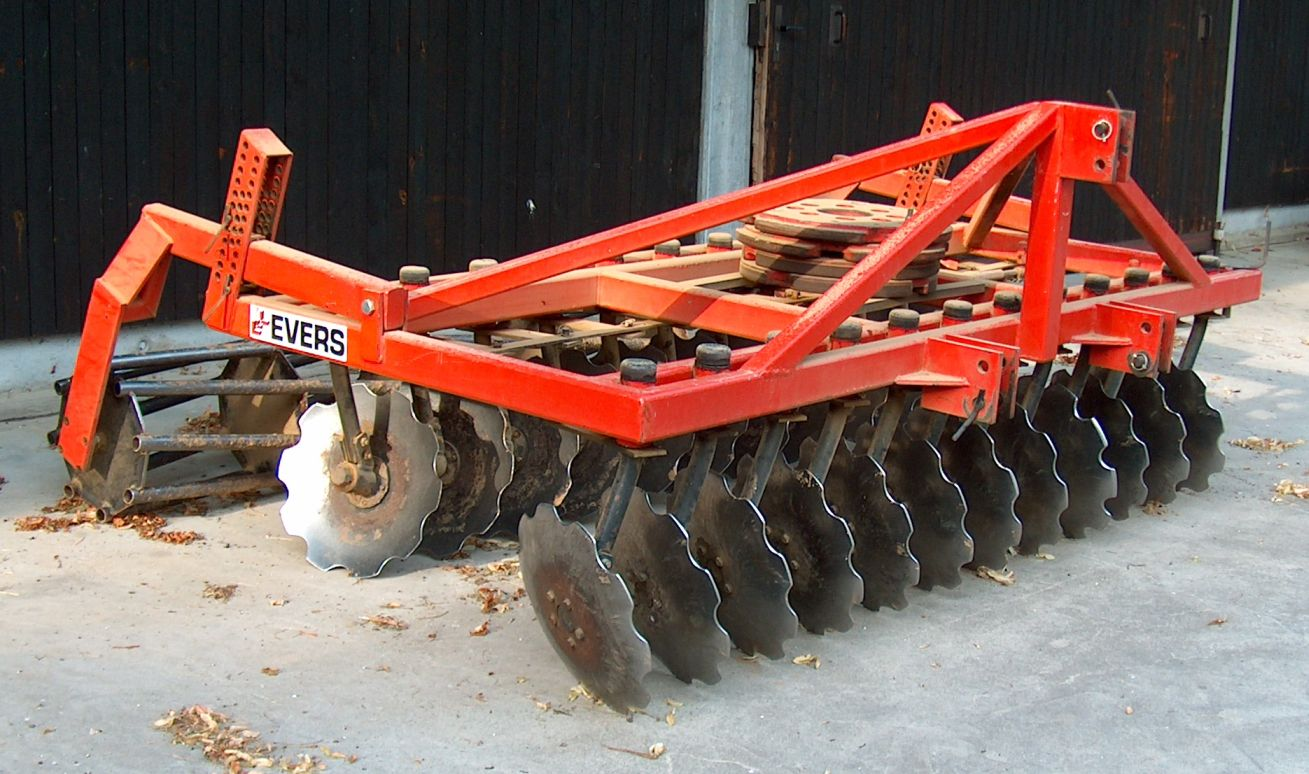
- Court: House of Lords
- Decided: 7 March 2007
- Transcript: Full text of judgment

Case history
- Prior action: [2005] 1 SC 155

Court membership
- Judges sitting: Lord Hope, Lord Scott, Lord Rodger, Lord Brown and Lord Mance

J & H Ritchie Ltd v Lloyd Ltd [2007] UKHL 9 is a Scottish contract law case, concerning the measure of damages for breach.

== Facts ==
Mr Ritchie has a business (J&H Ritchie Ltd) on North Arkleston Farm, Paisley. He bought an all in one seed drill and harrow from Lloyd Ltd, based at Hunters Hall, Kelso. It was advertised at a reduced price because it had been repossessed by the previous owner. It did not work. Lloyd Ltd agreed to take it back, investigate, and repair it. Lloyd Ltd returned it, but refused to say what the problem had been, and just said it had been repaired to "factory gate" standard. Mr Ritchie found out informally that two bearings for the rotors of the harrow had been missing. This was a serious defect. Mr Ritchie was concerned that when he had used it, further damage may have been caused, and he would not find out, because he would only start using it the next Spring. He was worried that by this time the manufacturer's guarantee would be affected. So Mr Ritchie rejected the machine.

The question was whether rejecting the equipment was permissible under s 35(6)(a) of the Sale of Goods Act 1979. This provides,

(6) The buyer is not by virtue of this section deemed to have accepted the goods merely because— (a) he asks for, or agrees to, their repair by or under an arrangement with the seller...

== Judgment ==
The House of Lords all agreed that Mr Ritchie was entitled to reject the equipment, even though it had in fact been repaired. Furthermore, Lloyd Ltd was in breach of a separate "inspection and repair agreement" by refusing to say what had been wrong with it. This had arisen when the machinery was taken away. It had to have been an implied term of that agreement that, so long as Lloyd Ltd were performing its duties, Mr Ritchie would not rescind the contract. Mr Ritchie would lose his right to reject the goods. But he could only make that choice when he was fully informed. The law has shown that this is correct.

Lord Hope's opinion went as follows:

12 The issue which lies at the heart of this case, as Lord Philip observed, is the effect of section 35(6)(a) of the Sale of Goods Act 1979, as amended, on the buyer's right to reject goods which, on delivery, are materially disconform to the contract... Prior to the introduction of that provision into the 1979 Act it was open to question whether asking the seller to have defects in the goods remedied might amount to an implied intimation of acceptance by the buyer or to an inconsistent act which would prevent him from rejecting the goods. This problem was considered by the Law Commission and the Scottish Law Commission. In a joint report on Sale and Supply of Goods (May 1987, Law Com No 160; Scot Law Com No 104) the Commissions said that they had decided not to recommend giving the seller a right to cure the goods: para 5.28. Instead they recommended that the 1979 Act should be amended so as to provide that if the buyer asks for or agrees to attempts being made to repair the goods (whether by the seller or under an arrangement with him), then this does not of itself amount to acceptance of the goods by the buyer: para 5.29:

"There may of course be other things done by the buyer which indicate that he has in fact accepted the goods, but in future he will safely be able to ask for or agree to repairs without reserving his right to reject the goods later. It does not in our view matter whether it is the seller or someone else who will attempt the repair. For example, the seller might repair the goods himself; he may have no repair facilities and send the goods way; or he may suggest that the buyer try some remedy himself (for example, changing a fuse or replacing a battery)."

13 While the solution which the Commissions recommended to encourage attempts at cure solved one problem, it is apparent from this case that it created another for which no solution was provided. What happens to the right of rejection if the repair which the buyer has asked for or agreed to is carried out? The buyer is not deemed to have accepted the defective goods merely because he asked for or agreed to their repair. But is he bound in every case to accept and pay for the goods simply because they are said by the seller, following their repair, to be conform to the contract? If not, in what circumstances does the buyer lose the right to reject, and in what circumstances does that right remain exercisable? Wisely, as it now appears, the Commissions did not attempt to grapple with this problem. A solution cannot be found in the authorities which were cited to your Lordships, none of which were concerned with it. The problem is not capable of being solved satisfactorily by a pre-ordained code. In the absence of express agreement, the answer to it must depend on what terms, if any, are to be implied into the contract at this stage, bearing in mind that the seller was in breach at the time of delivery and that the buyer retains the right to resile because the goods were not in conformity with the contract.

14 In William Morton & Co v Muir Brothers & Co, 1907 SC 1211, 1224 Lord McLaren said:

"The conception of an implied condition is one with which we are familiar in relation to contracts of every description, and if we seek to trace any such implied conditions to their source, it will be found that in almost every instance they are founded either on universal custom or in the nature of the contract itself. If the condition is such that every reasonable man on the one part would desire for his own protection to stipulate for the condition, and that no reasonable man on the other part would refuse to accede to it, then it is not unnatural that the condition should be taken for granted in all contracts of the class without the necessity of giving it formal expression."

In Liverpool City Council v Irwin [1977] AC 239, 258A-C Lord Cross of Chelsea pointed out that there was an important distinction between laying down by this means a prima face rule applicable to all cases of a defined type and cases where what the court was being in effect asked to do was to rectify a particular contract by inserting in it a term which the parties have not expressed. Dealing with the latter kind of case, he said at p. 258B-C:

"Here it is not enough for the court to say that the suggested term is a reasonable one the presence of which would make the contract a better or fairer one; it must be able to say that the insertion of the term is necessary to give - as it is put - 'business efficacy' to the contract and that if its absence had been pointed out at the time both parties - assuming them to have been reasonable men - would have agreed without hesitation to its insertion."

15 The present context is one where it would, in my opinion, be not at all out of place to resort to an implied term to fill the gap in the statutory code and govern the relationship between the parties when it was arranged that the harrow would be taken back to Kelso. What term, if any, it would be right to imply into the contract of sale at that stage will depend on the circumstances. There may be cases, for example, where the nature of the defect and exactly what needs to be done to correct it, and at what expense to the seller, are immediately obvious to both parties. It may then be said that a buyer who, having been equipped with all that knowledge, allows the seller to incur the expense of repair is under an implied obligation to accept and pay for the goods once the repair has been carried out. His right to resile will be lost when the repair has been completed. The buyer's protection is the reasonable opportunity to examine the goods after delivery which he is given by section 35(2) of the 1979 Act. Lord Marnoch said in para 14 that the doctrine of personal bar would provide the answer if the buyer claimed the right to reject in such circumstances. But, as we are dealing here with a statutory code and its consequences, I would prefer to find the solution in an implied term.

16 That however is not this case. The nature of the defect was not immediately obvious and it was not known what, if anything, could be done to correct it. But the underlying principles are the same. The effect of section 35(2)(a) is that, as the buyer is not deemed to have accepted the goods, he retains the right to reject them. That right will, of course, be lost if, at any time, he decides to accept the goods or is deemed to have accepted them. But it is a right of election which the buyer cannot be expected to exercise until he has the information that he needs to make an informed choice. The seller, for his part, cannot refuse to give him the information that he needs to exercise it. As Hale LJ said in Clegg v Andersson t/a Nordic Marine [2003] EWCA Civ 320, para 75:

"… a buyer does not accept the goods simply because he asks for or agrees to their repair: s 35(6). It follows that if a buyer is seeking information which the seller has agreed to supply which will enable the buyer to make a properly informed choice between acceptance, rejection or cure, and if cure in what way, he cannot have lost his right to reject."

17 Clegg v Andersson was a case where the buyer had asked for information which the seller agreed to give him and had not yet decided whether or not to ask for, or agree to, remedial works to the defective goods. In this case the appellants took that further step without first obtaining an undertaking from the respondents to provide them with information as to the nature of the defect once the harrow had been inspected and what had been done to repair it. It is plain that they would have been entitled to exercise their right of rejection if, on being asked to give such an undertaking in advance, the respondents had declined to do so. Should the fact that it did not occur to Mr Ritchie to obtain an express undertaking to that effect before the harrow was taken away make any difference?

18 The harrow was a complex piece of power operated agricultural machinery. Information of the kind that Mr Ritchie was asking for was obviously needed if the appellants were to make a properly informed choice between accepting and rejecting the equipment on being told that the harrow had been repaired to factory gate standard. A condition that the seller would provide this information, if it was asked for, was one which every buyer would seek for his own protection in such circumstances. It was one which no reasonable seller, who was already in breach of contract, could refuse as a condition of being given the opportunity to cure the defect and preserve the contract.

19 In these circumstances - which cannot be assumed to apply in every case - I would hold that the respondents were under an implied obligation to provide the appellants with the information that Mr Ritchie asked for. As they refused to give them that information the respondents were in breach of that obligation. The appellants were deprived of the information that they needed to make a properly informed choice. In my opinion they were entitled to reject the equipment even although, as it turned out, the respondents were able to prove afterwards that the harrow had been repaired to factory gate standard.

== See also ==
- English contract law
