= Smith, Hogan and Ormerod's Criminal Law =

Book by Sir John Smith, Brian Hogan and David Ormerod KC (Hon)

Smith, Hogan and Ormerod's Criminal Law, formerly published as Smith and Hogan's Criminal Law, and referred to as Smith and Hogan, is a doctrinal textbook on criminal law in England and Wales.

It is used in university law schools, relied upon throughout the legal profession and in the courts, and is regularly cited in the High Court of Justice, Court of Appeal (Criminal Division) and the Supreme Court of the United Kingdom.

The text was originally co-written by Professor Sir John C. Smith and Professor Brian Hogan (first to seventh editions, 1965-1992). Following the death of Hogan in 1996, Smith completed the eighth, ninth and tenth editions (1996, 1999, 2002) alone. After the publication of the tenth edition, Smith placed future editions of the work in the hands of Professor David Ormerod. Ormerod completed the eleventh, twelfth and thirteenth editions (2011, 2015, 2018) alone and was then joined by Karl Laird for the fourteenth, fifteenth and sixteenth editions (2015, 2018 and 2021). Matthew Gibson joined them for the seventeenth edition (2024).

Additional chapters are published as online only additional resources, and there are companion Cases and Materials and Essentials of Criminal Law series.

== Editions ==
=== Main Work ===
Edition	Published	Authors	Publisher	ISBN
First edition	September 1965	J. C. Smith & B. Hogan	Butterworths	N/A (pre-ISBN era)
Second edition	June 1969	J. C. Smith & B. Hogan	Butterworths	978-0-406-65802-9
Third edition	July 1973	J. C. Smith & B. Hogan	Butterworths	978-0-406-65804-3
Fourth edition	1978	J. C. Smith & B. Hogan	Butterworths	978-0-406-65805-0
Fifth edition	1983	J. C. Smith & B. Hogan	Butterworths	978-0-406-65825-8
Sixth edition	1988	J. C. Smith & B. Hogan	Butterworths	978-0-406-65813-5
Seventh edition	1992	J. C. Smith & B. Hogan	Butterworths	978-0-406-95741-2
Eighth edition	1996	J. C. Smith	Butterworths	978-0-406-08187-2
Ninth edition	1999	J. C. Smith	Butterworths	978-0-406-98383-1
Tenth edition	2002	J. C. Smith	LexisNexis Butterworths	978-0-406-94801-4
Eleventh edition	2005	D. Ormerod	OUP	978-0-406-97730-4
Twelfth edition	2008	D. Ormerod	OUP	9780199214683
Thirteenth edition	2011	D. Ormerod	OUP	978-0-19-958649-3
Fourteenth edition	June 2015	D. Ormerod & K. Laird	OUP	978-0-19-870231-3
Fifteenth edition	July 2018	D. Ormerod & K. Laird	OUP	978-0-19-880709-4
Sixteenth edition	July 2021	D. Ormerod & K. Laird	OUP	978-0-19-884970-4
Seventeenth edition	September 2024	D. Ormerod, K. Laird & M. Gibson	OUP	978-0-19-889094-2

=== Cases and Materials ===
Edition	Published	Authors	Publisher	ISBN13
1st	1975	J. C. Smith & B. Hogan	Butterworths	
2nd	1980	J. C. Smith & B. Hogan	Butterworths	
3rd	1986	J. C. Smith & B. Hogan	Butterworths	978-0-406-65825-8
4th	1990	J. C. Smith & B. Hogan	Butterworths	978-0-406-51121-8
5th	1993	J. C. Smith & B. Hogan	Butterworths	978-0-406-01480-1
6th	1996	J. C. Smith	Butterworths	978-0-406-08188-9
7th	1998	J. C. Smith	Butterworths	
8th	August 2002	J. C. Smith	LexisNexis Butterworths	978-0-406-94800-7
9th	December 2005	D. Ormerod	OUP	978-0-406-97729-8
10th	May 2009	D. Ormerod	OUP	978-0-19-921869-1
11th	July 2014	D. Ormerod & K. Laird	OUP	978-0-19-969488-4
12th	July 2017	D. Ormerod & K. Laird	OUP	978-0-19-878871-3
13th	July 2020	D. Ormerod & K. Laird	OUP	978-0-19-883194-5

=== Essentials of Criminal Law ===
Edition	Published	Authors	Publisher	ISBN13
1st	May 2015	J. Child & D. Ormerod	OUP	978-0-19-968956-9
2nd	April 2017	J. Child & D. Ormerod	OUP	978-0-19-878868-3
3rd	May 2019	J. Child & D. Ormerod	OUP	978-0-19-883192-1
4th	March 2021	J. Child & D. Ormerod	OUP	978-0-19-886996-2
5th	July 2023	J. Child & D. Ormerod	OUP	978-0-19-887309-9
6th	April 2025	J. Child & D. Ormerod	OUP	978-0-19-892504-0

== Recent Citation in Appellate Courts ==
=== Supreme Court of the United Kingdom ===
- Pwr v DPP [2022] UKSC 2
- R v Jogee [2016] UKSC 8

=== Court of Appeal (Criminal and Civil Divisions) ===
- R v Hobday [2025] EWCA Crim 46
- R v Ivanova [2024] EWCA Crim 808
- R v Drake [2023] EWCA Crim 1454
- R v Wu [2023] EWCA Crim 338
- R v Keal [2023] EWCA Crim 1454
- R v Smith [2020] EWCA Crim 38
- R v Melin [2019] EWCA Crim 557
- R v Wallace [2018] EWCA Crim 690
- R v Rejmanski [2017] EWCA Crim 2061
- Proctor v Chief Constable of Cleveland [2017] EWCA Civ 1531
- R v Ray [2017] EWCA Crim 1391
- R v Riddell [2017] EWCA Crim 413
- R v Lunn [2017] EWCA Crim 34
- R v Chapman [2015] EWCA Crim 539
- R v Gurpinar [2015] EWCA Crim 178

=== High Court ===
- Perry v Government of USA [2021] EWHC 1956 (Admin)
- Oraki v CPS [2018] EWHC 115 (Admin)
- Loake v CPS [2017] EWHC 2855 (Admin)
- Ivey v Genting Casinos UK Ltd (t/a Crockfords Club) [2014] EWHC 3394 (QB)

== See also ==
- Bibliography of English criminal law
- Ashworth's Principles of Criminal Law
- Kenny's Outlines of Criminal Law
