= John Burke (publisher) =

Legal publisher

John McDonald Burke was a barrister and legal publisher. He served as a senior editor at Sweet & Maxwell.

Burke was called to the bar at Lincoln's Inn and he joined Sweet & Maxwell, as an editor, taking responsibility for several publications.

Notably, he was co-founding editor of The Criminal Law Review with Peter Allsop. He also prepared Volume 17 (the complete index) of Sir William Searle Holdsworth's A History of English Law.
