= Jamieson v HM Advocate =

Jamieson v HM Advocate is a notable legal case which established a precedent in Scotland which held that a man does not commit rape where he honestly, albeit unreasonably, believes his victim is consenting. This was a criminal case decided by the High Court of Justiciary sitting as the Court of Criminal Appeal. The appeal case was heard before a panel of three judges with the Lord Justice-General (Lord Hope) as president, with Lord Allanbridge and Lord Cowie. The case is reported at 1994 SLT 537.

The decision relies upon the point that in Scots Law, a criminal act consists of two elements, the factual act done and the mens rea or intention of the perpetrator in carrying out that action. The crime of rape consisted, at that time, of a man having vaginal sexual intercourse with a woman without her consent, with the crime of rape being defined at common law. Therefore, it was held that the mens rea element is that the man either believes the woman is not consenting or is "reckless or indifferent to the matter of consent". Accordingly, it was held that if the man genuinely believes the woman is consenting, he is not committing the specific crime of rape. This was established law per the cited cases of Sweeney v. X 1982 S.C.C.R. 509 and Meek v. H.M. Advocate 1983 S.L.T. 280.

In Jamieson the specific point was whether this belief requires to be based on objectively reasonable grounds, or if it was sufficient that the alleged perpetrator genuinely held this belief even although another person in the same circumstances might not have the same belief. The decision was that honest belief is all that is required, although an absence of reasonable grounds to hold such a belief would affect whether a jury would accept if as a matter of fact he did genuinely believe this.

This precedent is unlikely to be considered as still 'good law' as the Sexual Offences (Scotland) Act 2009 (which provided the first statutory definition of rape and of consent) states at S.1 (1)(b) that [a person 'A' commits rape upon 'B'] "(b)without any reasonable belief that B consents".
