= BA (Nigeria) v Secretary of State =

BA (Nigeria) v Secretary of State for the Home Department and others
- Court: Supreme Court of the United Kingdom
- Decided: 26 November 2009
- Citation: [2009] UKSC 7
- Transcript: http://www.supremecourt.uk/docs/uksc_2009_0098_judgment.pdf

Court membership
- Judges sitting: Lord Hope, Lord Scott, Lord Rodger, Lady Hale and Lord Brown

BA (Nigeria) v Secretary of State was a case heard by the Supreme Court of the United Kingdom on the 30 July 2009. The justices were Lord Hope of Craighead, the Deputy President of the Supreme Court, Lord Scott of Foscote, Lord Rodger of Earlsferry, Baroness Hale of Richmond, Lord Brown of Eaton-under-Heywood.

== Facts ==
The case regards BA, a Nigerian national who first entered the United Kingdom in 1988 as a visitor and was given 6 months leave to enter. He was then later given leave to remain as a student until the end of August, 1991, and then on the 25 of May 1994, he was given permanent leave to remain, as per his being married to a British citizen. On 20 May 2005, he was served with a decision by the Secretary of State that he was to be deported following his release on licence from a 10-year sentence of imprisonment for conspiracy to import class A drugs. He appealed against the asylum and immigration tribunal on human rights grounds and failed. He was served with a deportation order on 25 May 2007. On 25 June 2007 and 8 August 2007 further submissions were made on his behalf as to why he should not be deported. The Secretary of State agreed to consider his reasons for seeking revocation of the deportation order, but she declined to revoke it. Directions were then given for him to be removed from this country on 29 December 2007.

== Judgment ==
The Supreme Court so held in dismissing an appeal by the Secretary of State for the Home Department against a decision of the Court of Appeal allowing the appeal of the claimants, BA, a Nigerian national, and PE, a national of Cameroon, from a decision of Blake J, sitting in the Administrative Court of the Queen's Bench Division [2008] 4 All ER 798, that the claimants had no right of appeal exercisable within the UK against the Secretary of State's refusal to revoke deportation orders made against them. Lord Roger and Lord Brown delivered concurring opinions, Lord Scott agreed and Baroness Hale delivered a dissenting opinion.

== Significance ==
The court ruled that, contrary to the opinion expressed by the Home Secretary in refusing to rescind the plaintiff's deportation order, an appeal of a refusal to revoke a deportation order did not have to be made from abroad.
