= Re I (a child) =

I (a child)
- Court: Supreme Court of the United Kingdom
- Decided: 1 December 2009
- Citation: [2009] UKSC 10
- Transcript: Full transcript of judgment

Court membership
- Judges sitting: Lord Hope, Lady Hale, Lord Collins, Lord Kerr and Lord Clarke

I (a child) was a case heard by the Supreme Court of the United Kingdom on the 10 and 11 June 2009 and decided upon on 1 December 2009. The case principally involves the mother (a British Citizen of Indian origin), the father (a British Citizen of Pakistani origin) and their son (a British Citizen also born in the United Kingdom). The child was born on the 27 July 2000 and was 9 years old at the time of the case.

== Facts ==
The parents separated in September 2002 and divorced in 2003, no court orders were made with regards to the child. He was admitted to hospital on the 1 November 2001 with fractures to his arms. At the fact-finding hearing in May 2002, District Judge Brasse found that the injuries were non-accidental and that the father had caused them. However, at the welfare hearing in December 2002, he reviewed that finding in the light of the new evidence which had emerged during the welfare inquiries and decided that the mother had been responsible.

In mid-2004 the father applied for leave to take the child to live in Pakistan with the father's mother and sister. On 16 September 2004, Hedley J granted that leave. At the same time, the father (who was represented by counsel at the hearing) gave the conventional undertaking to return the child to this jurisdiction when ordered to do so by the court. The order also provided for interim contact with the mother until the child left the jurisdiction. The father and the boy moved to Pakistan on the 22 December 2004, and have lived there ever since.

== Judgment ==
The supreme court case was regarding whether courts in England and Wales had jurisdiction in this case. The court ruled that courts in England and Wales did have jurisdiction in this case

== Significance ==
The case brought before the supreme court regarded the second appeal by the mother, following the father's trying before HHJ Barnett whether the court had jurisdiction, HHJ Barnett held that the court did not have jurisdiction under the Family Law Act 1986. The first appeal was before the Court of Appeal, in which the mother's legal representatives argued that article 12 of Brussels II Revised applied. Thorpe LJ found that HHJ Barnett had reached the right result.

== See also ==
- UK human rights
