= Scots administrative law =

Scots administrative law governs the rules of administrative law in Scotland, the body of case law, statutes, secondary legislation and articles which provide the framework of procedures for judicial control over government agencies and private bodies.

== See also ==
- Bannatyne v Overtoun
- Burmah Oil Co Ltd v Lord Advocate
- Judicial review in Scotland
- MacCormick v Lord Advocate
- West v Secretary of State for Scotland
