= R (E) v Governing Body of JFS =

- Court: Supreme Court of the United Kingdom
- Full case name: R (on the application of E) v Governing Body of JFS and the Admissions Appeal Panel of JFS
- Argued: 27–29 October 2009
- Decided: 14 December 2009
- Neutral citation: [2009] UKSC 15
- Reported at: [2010] 2 AC 728, [2010] 2 WLR 153

Case history
- Prior history: [2009] EWCA Civ 626 (affirmed)
- Procedural history: [2009] UKSC 1

Holding
- Appeal dismissed. The admissions process had resulted in discrimination on the grounds of race either directly (per the majority) or indirectly (per Lords Hope and Walker). Lords Rodger and Brown dissenting on both points.

Case opinions
- Majority: Lords Phillips, Mance, Clarke, Kerr & Lady Hale (finding on the issue of direct discrimination) Lords Hope & Walker (finding on the issue of indirect discrimination)
- Dissent: Lords Rodger & Brown

Area of law
- Discrimination, Education, Race Relations Act 1976

R (E) v Governing Body of JFS ([2009] UKSC 15) is a United Kingdom discrimination case, concerning the JFS's policy of denying entry to people whom they defined as not being Jewish.

The United Kingdom Supreme Court held, in seriatim judgments, by a majority of five to four that the school had discriminated against pupils, including the claimant, "E", on the basis of race under the Race Relations Act 1976. Five Justices held that the school had directly discriminated against applicant pupils and two held that the school was indirectly discriminating on grounds of race. The case was the first adjudicated by the newly established court.

== Facts ==
The defendant, JFS (formerly the Jewish Free School), is a Modern Orthodox Jewish school affiliated to the United Synagogue. It favoured applications from Jewish prospective students, as legally permitted for faith schools. The Jewish plaintiff, E, was father of a son whose mother was of Italian Catholic heritage and had converted to Judaism under the auspices of Masorti (Conservative) Judaism. The United Synagogue did not recognise her conversion, and because Jewishness is inherited from one's mother the son was likewise not considered Jewish. In October 2006, E made enquiries with the United Synagogue as to whether his son could convert under Orthodox auspices in time for entry to JFS in September 2007. He was advised the process could take several years and that such applications to JFS are very rarely successful given that the school is highly oversubscribed. He applied for his son but did not declare to the school's admissions board the mother's conversion history.

By April 2007, E had not supplied JFS with the requested information, whereupon the school advised him that, being oversubscribed that year, it was unlikely his son could be offered a place. He thereupon unsuccessfully appealed for reconsideration of his application. In July 2008, E sought to prosecute JFS in the High Court on the grounds of alleged racial discrimination, but judge James Munby ruled contrariwise, holding JFS' selection criteria were not intrinsically different from Christian or Islamic faith schools and their being declared illegal could adversely affect "the admission arrangements in a very large number of faith schools of many different faiths and denominations".

E Appealed and on 25 June 2009 the Court of Appeal reversed the verdict. The JFS appealed in turn to the Supreme Court.

== Judgment ==
Lord Phillips, Lady Hale, Lord Mance, Lord Clarke and Lord Kerr held that the school had directly discriminated on grounds of race. Lord Clarke wrote,

I do not accept they were not considering M’s ethnic origins or making a decision on ethnic grounds....As I see it, once it is accepted...that the reason M is not a member of the Jewish religion is that his forbears in the matrilineal line were not Orthodox Jews and that, in that sense his less favourable treatment is determined by his descent, it follows that he is discriminated against on ethnic grounds....The question is, in my opinion...whether it is discrimination on ethnic grounds to discriminate against all those who are not descended from Jewish women.

—

Lord Hope and Lord Walker held there had been indirect discrimination on grounds of race. Lord Hope wrote that identifying the school's admission criteria as racial, rather than religious, was to confuse the effect of this unequal treatment with the grounds for the treatment; he and Lord Walker said that the school's admission policy nonetheless put certain Jews at a disadvantage.

Lord Rodger and Lord Brown dissented. Lord Rodger said that the pupil's mother "could have been as Italian in origin as Sophia Loren and as Roman Catholic as the Pope" as long as she had converted to Judaism in a manner that satisfied the school governors. Both said that the indirect discrimination found by Lords Hope and Walker was acceptable in the service of the school's objective; Lord Brown criticized the idea of imposing a test for admission based on practice and belief as closer to the Christian definition of members of a faith, when Jewish law defines membership in the religion by birth.

== See also ==
- Who is a Jew?
- Zera Yisrael, recent genetic descendants of Jews who are not legally Jewish according to religious criteria

== Sources ==
- R (E) v Governing Body of JFS [2009] UKSC 15 (16 December 2009)
- E, R (on the application of) v Governing Body of JFS & Ors [2009] EWCA Civ 626 (25 June 2009)
- E v The Governing Body of JFS & Anor [2008] EWHC 1535 (Admin) (3 July 2008)
