= Louca v German Judicial Authority =

Louca v A German Judicial Authority [2009] UKSC 4 is an English criminal appeal, originating in the High Court and ending in the Supreme Court in 2009. The appeal came from a Cypriot national who was sought by the German authorities. In the judgment, the United Kingdom Supreme Court ruled that when a European Arrest Warrant (EAW) is issued by authorities of one Member state for execution in another, does not need to reference to other EAWs. However, the reference to a domestic arrest warrant is mandatory.

== Facts ==
Mr Louca was arrested in England for extradition to Germany for trial of six alleged offences of tax evasion, pursuant to a EAW issued on 14 July 2008 by the Office of the Public Prosecutor of Bielefeld. The offences were allegedly committed in 2003-2004. The warrant was certified by the Serious Organized Crime Agency, following the requirements under UK's domestic law which allows the UK government to extradite a person to European countries. Two previous EAWs against Louca resulted in his arrest, but were withdrawn because of minor technicalities.

Locua argued that it was unlawful to extradite him under an EAW which did not refer to all the previous EAWs, as reference to them was required under Section 2(4)(b) and 2(6)(c) of the Extradition Act, 2003.

== Judgment ==
The Supreme Court unanimously dismissed the appeal. Lord Mance gave the judgment of the court with Lords Hope, Rodger, Collins and Kerr concurring. Lord Mance started by referring to the governing sections of the Extradition Act 2003 which were to be found in Part 1 of the Act (which deals with European Arrest Warrants) and went on to look at the Council Framework Decision on the European arrest warrant issued by the European Union which was implemented in the United Kingdom via Part 1 of the Extradition Act 2003.

National courts are under an obligation to interpret national law as far as possible in the light of the wording and purpose of the European framework decision in order to attain the result which it pursues. In particular, Lord Mance looked at Articles 1(1), 2(1) and 8(1) as well as sections (b) and (f) of the annexed modern European Arrest Warrant. In particular, Article 8(1)(c) provides that, “The European arrest warrant shall contain the following information… (c) evidence of an enforceable judgment, an arrest warrant or any other enforceable judicial decision having the same effect, coming within the scope of Articles 1 and 2…”.

It had been argued before the Divisional Court that the phrase “any other warrant” in Section 2(4)(b) of the 2003 Act should include European arrest warrants. This argument was rejected on the basis of five points:

1. the Framework Decision did not use the phrase “European arrest warrant” in Article 8(1)(c) as it did elsewhere when referring to such a warrant;
2. the phrase “an enforceable judgment, an arrest warrant or any other enforceable judicial decision” could not be understood as being limited to a European arrest warrant;
3. the phrase “coming within the scope of Articles 1 and 2” meant that the enforceable judgment, arrest warrant or other enforceable judicial decision must be “for the purposes of conducting a criminal prosecution or executing a custodial sentence or detention order” (Article 1(1)) and be “issued for acts punishable by the law of the issuing Member State by a custodial sentence or a detention order for a maximum period of at least 12 months or, where a sentence has been passed or a detention order has been made, for sentences of at least four months” (Article 2(1));
4. one EAW was unlikely to be based on another;
5. there was no point in requiring such a warrant to contain information about an earlier EAW on which it was not based and on which reliance was no longer required.

On this basis, the Divisional Court held that Article 8(1)(c) and Section 2(4)(b) were concerned with domestic judgments, arrest warrants or other decisions, and not with any other EAW issued in respect of the alleged offending, still less one which had been withdrawn.

At the Supreme Court, it had been argued that the fifth point was flawed and that there was a purpose to requiring evidence of any other EAWs, even if withdrawn, in that they could constitute the basis of, or be relevant to, a decision by the executing court to set side (or consider whether to set aside) the subsisting EAW as an abuse of process.

Lord Mance rejected this argument, holding that the text in Article 8(1)(g) and section (f) of the model EAW did not oblige disclosure of previous EAWs and subsequently there was no reason to interpret Section 2(4)(b) of the 2003 Act as “intended to require the executing court to be informed by the EAW of one (and only one) point – the existence of another EAW – which might, in some conceivable case, be of some conceivable relevance to an argument of abuse of process." The appel was dismissed. The court held;

"When a European Arrest Warrant is issued by the authorities of one Member State for execution in another, it must include a reference to the domestic warrant upon which the European Arrest Warrant is based, but need not include references to any other European Arrest Warrant which may have been issued on the basis of the domestic warrant."

== See also ==
- UK human rights
