= John Murray, Lord Dervaird =

Scottish judge

John Ian Murray, Lord Dervaird (8 July 1935 – 23 December 2015) was a Scottish judge. His judicial career ended in 1989 after a scandal in which it was rumoured he had an affair with another man. Both Malcolm Rifkind and the then Lord President, Lord Hope of Craighead, were responsible for Lord Dervaird's resignation being demanded, and there has been criticism in consequence on human rights grounds by Peter Tatchell for the way the crisis was dealt with.
