= David Hope, Baron Hope of Craighead =

British judge (born 1938)

The Right Honourable The Lord Hope of Craighead KT PC FRSE
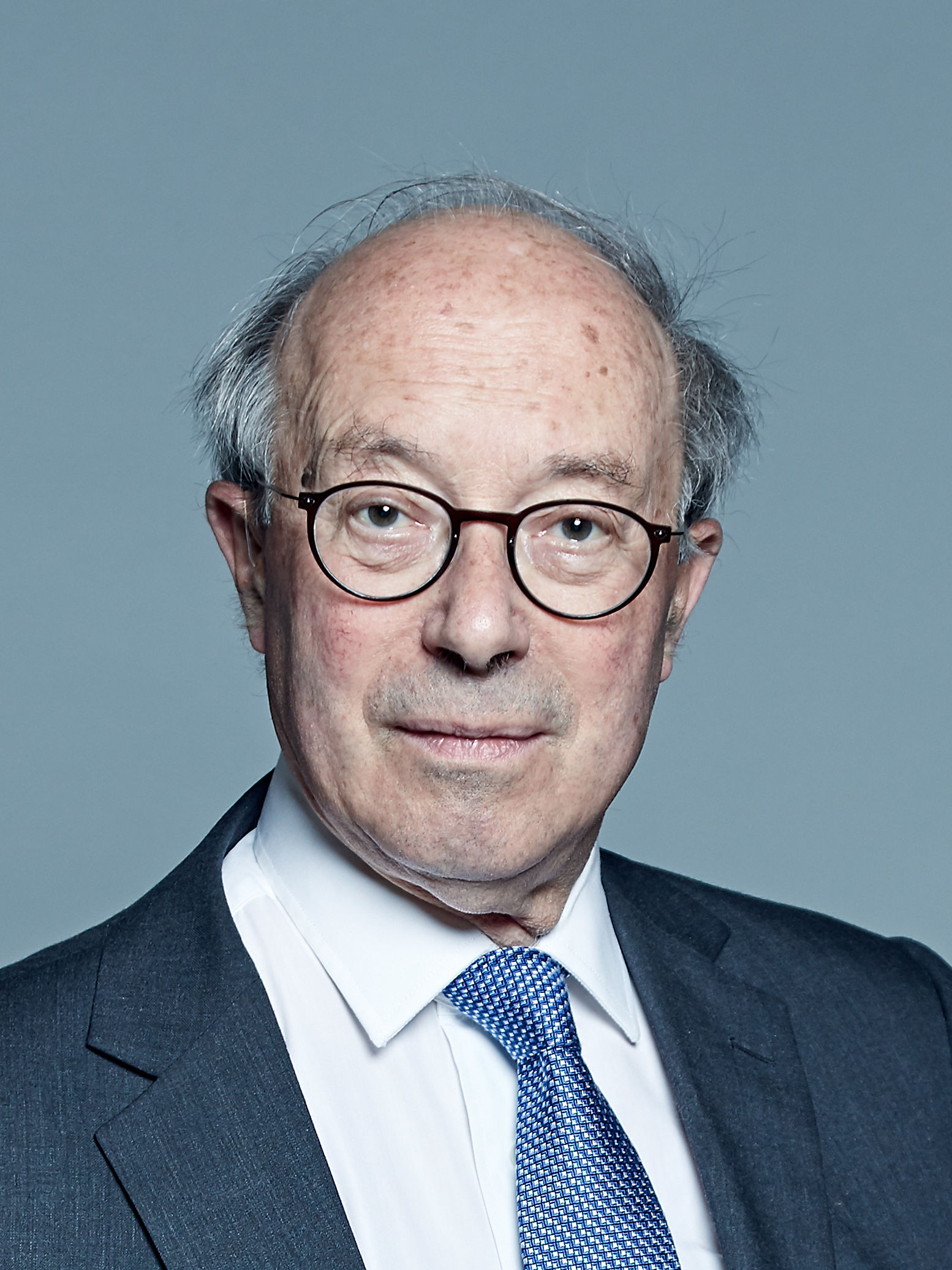
- Hope in 2018

Convenor of the Crossbench Peers
- In office 28 September 2015 – September 2019
- Preceded by: The Lord Laming
- Succeeded by: The Lord Judge

Deputy President of the Supreme Court of the United Kingdom (Note: Second Senior Lord of Appeal in Ordinary until 30 September 2009)
- In office 21 April 2009 – 26 June 2013
- Nominated by: Jack Straw
- Appointed by: Elizabeth II
- President: The Lord Phillips of Worth Matravers
- Preceded by: The Lord Hoffmann
- Succeeded by: The Baroness Hale of Richmond

Lord of Appeal in Ordinary
- In office 1 October 1996 – 1 October 2009
- Preceded by: The Lord Keith of Kinkel
- Succeeded by: Position abolished

Lord Justice General Lord President of the Court of Session
- In office 1989–1996
- Preceded by: The Lord Emslie
- Succeeded by: The Lord Rodger of Earlsferry

Chancellor of the University of Strathclyde
- In office 1998–2013
- Deputy: Sir Jim McDonald
- Succeeded by: The Lord Smith of Kelvin

Member of the House of Lords
- Lord Temporal
- Life peerage 28 February 1995

Personal details
- Born: James Arthur David Hope; 27 June 1938 (age 88)
- Party: Crossbencher
- Spouse: Katharine Mary Kerr
- Education: St John's College, Cambridge; University of Edinburgh
- Profession: Advocate

Military service
- Branch/service: British Army
- Years of service: 1957–59
- Rank: Lieutenant
- Unit: Seaforth Highlanders

James Arthur David Hope, Baron Hope of Craighead (born 27 June 1938) is a retired Scottish judge who served as the Lord President of the Court of Session and Lord Justice General, Scotland's most senior judge, and later as first Deputy President of the Supreme Court of the United Kingdom from 2009 until his retirement in 2013. He had previously been the Second Senior Lord of Appeal in Ordinary. He is the Chief Justice of Abu Dhabi Global Market Courts until his retirement from that position in March 2026.

He has published 5 volumes of his diaries, archived his papers at the National Library of Scotland, and been involved in several controversies. He continues in private practice as an arbitrator. His other appointments have included Lord High Commissioner to the General Assembly of the Church of Scotland, and Convenor of the Crossbench peers in the House of Lords.

== Background and personal ==
=== Background ===
A descendant of Charles Hope, Lord Granton, Lord President of the Court of Session from 1811 to 1841, through his third son, David Hope was born on 27 June 1938 to Edinburgh lawyer Arthur Henry Cecil Hope, OBE, WS and Muriel Ann Neilson Hope (née Collie). He was educated at Edinburgh Academy and Rugby School. He completed National Service as an officer with the Seaforth Highlanders, between 1957 and 1959, where he reached the rank of lieutenant. In 1959 he commenced his studies as an Open Scholar at St John's College, Cambridge where he read classics. He graduated with a B.A. degree in 1962. He then returned to Scotland and studied at the Faculty of Law of the University of Edinburgh, graduating LL.B. in 1965.

=== Personal ===
In 1966, Hope married Katharine Mary Kerr, daughter of solicitor Mark Kerr WS, with whom he has twin sons and a daughter. Lord Hope of Craighead resides in Edinburgh and in 2014 appeared in a television documentary programme about Moray Place.

== Career before the UK Bench ==
Hope was admitted as an advocate in 1965 and became a Queen's Counsel in 1978. He served as Standing Junior Counsel in Scotland to the Board of the Inland Revenue from 1974 to 1978, and as an Advocate Depute from 1978 to 1982, prosecuting cases on behalf of the Crown. Between 1985 and 1986, he was Chairman of the Medical Appeal Tribunal and the Pensions Appeal Tribunal. From 1986 to 1989 he was Dean of the Faculty of Advocates. He is an Honorary Bencher of Gray's Inn.

== The Bench in the UK ==
In 1989, Hope became a Senator of the College of Justice, taking the judicial title Lord Hope, and was appointed directly from the practising Bar to the offices of Lord President of the Court of Session and Lord Justice General. He was made a Privy Counsellor at this time, and was awarded a life peerage in the 1995 New Year Honours. His title was gazetted as Baron Hope of Craighead, of Bamff in the District of Perth and Kinross on 28 February 1995. In 1996, Lord Hope of Craighead retired as Lord President to become a Lord of Appeal in Ordinary, and was succeeded by Lord Rodger of Earlsferry. On 21 April 2009, he was appointed Second Senior Law Lord, succeeding Lord Hoffmann. On 1 October 2009, Hope became one of the first Justices of the Supreme Court of the United Kingdom, and its first Deputy President. He retired from that position on 26 June 2013.

== Positions after retirement from UK Bench ==
=== Private practice ===
Lord Hope of Craighead, having retired from the Bench in the UK, became available privately as a practising arbitrator. In October 2013 he joined Brick Court chambers in London as an arbitrator. Additionally he joined Terra Firma chambers in Edinburgh as an arbitrator from June 2023.

=== Abu Dhabi ===
From October 2015 until his retirement from the position in March 2026, Lord Hope of Craighead served as remunerated Chief Justice of Abu Dhabi Global Market Courts. In 2024 in the House of Lords Register of Interests he declared an income of £257,000 for the period 1 January – 31 December 2023 for performing his duties.

=== Honorary positions ===
In November 2014 it was announced that Lord Hope of Craighead would be appointed as Lord High Commissioner to the General Assembly of the Church of Scotland in 2015. This position ceased to be occupied by him after 27 May 2016.

He served as Convenor of the Crossbench peers in the House of Lords from 2015 to 2019. He has been an Honorary Fellow of St John's College, Cambridge, since 1995.

=== House of Lords ===
In 2023, Lord Hope of Craighead introduced an amendment to the Public Order Bill at the report stage, directed to the wording of the protest-related offences of locking on, tunnelling and interference with works and infrastructure in sections 1 to 8 of the Act. The amendment was adopted by the Conservative government. Police were to intervene where there was "serious disruption". The amendment widely defined this as any activity that "prevents or would hinder to more than a minor degree the individuals or the organisation from carrying out their daily activities."

On 20 March 2024, Lord Hope, as an independent peer successfully moved in the House of Lords an amendment of his own to the Safety of Rwanda (Asylum and Immigration) Bill whereby implementation of the legislation would be delayed pending the decision of a proposed panel of experts tasked with deciding whether Rwanda satisfied certain safeguarding criteria. The amendment was removed by the House of Commons on Monday 15 April 2024 but reinstated in substance once again by the House of Lords on Wednesday 17 April 2024. Speaking on the BBC radio programme "Today" on 18 April 2024, Lord Hope of Craighead defended his intervention on the basis that he was seeking to correct a defect in the legislation.

== Lord Hope of Craighead's Historical Archives ==
In November 2014, Lord Hope of Craighead donated to the National Library of Scotland 16 boxes containing 90 files spanning the period 1953 - 2014. Access to all these documents is unrestricted. The Inventory references: 1-79 Professional Papers (1-46 Advocate's Opinions, 1978–1989; 47-55 Dean of Faculty Notes and Draft Letters, 1986–1989; 56-78 Judicial Opinions, 1989–1994; 79 Financial Papers, 1965–1989); 80 Personal Papers, 1959–1962; 81-90 Ephemera, 1953–2014. The first 46 items in the Inventory, Advocate's Opinions, 1978–1989, were produced under legal professional privilege.

== Diaries ==
Starting in 2018, Lord Hope of Craighead's diaries were published in five volumes. These are:

Senior Counsel 1978–1986: Lord Hope's Diaries Volume I

Dean of Faculty 1986–1989: Lord Hope's Diaries Volume II

Lord President 1989–1996: Lord Hope's Diaries Volume III

House of Lords 1996–2009: Lord Hope's Diaries Volume IV

UK Supreme Court and Afterwards 2009–2015: Lord Hope's Diaries Volume V

The works chronicled his life, experiences and rise to the top, from Senior Counsel to his retirement from the Supreme Court. They contain observations on his judicial colleagues and disclose information as to panel deliberations, as appears in the Controversies section below.

== Controversies ==
On 22 December 1989, Lord Dervaird, a Scottish judge, resigned from the bench after two years of service. On 17 January 1990, the press reported that three senior Scottish judges had been questioned by Lord Hope, the Lord President, as to their possible involvement in vice rings or homosexual behaviour. This reportage arose because Lord Hope had called a meeting of newspaper editors at his Edinburgh home, where he detailed the rumours "unattributively" regarding three Court of Session judges (out of a total of 24 at the time). This meeting caused the scandals to be "splashed across the front pages." According to Hope's own account in his diaries, he invited Scottish radio and television editors as well as newspaper editors, and called the meeting because of pressure from politicians and from his judicial colleagues to put an end to the circulation of rumours that a ring of homosexuals in Scotland included a number of judges. He states that he set out his understanding of the facts concerning four judges, rather than three, and that the effect of the meeting was to contain the rumours, which ended shortly afterwards. By December 2016, government papers covering these events had been declassified and were now available to the public. This resulted in human rights campaigner Peter Tatchell demanding an apology from Malcolm Rifkind, the former Scottish Secretary, for his actions in forcing Lord Dervaird from judicial office because of rumours of his being homosexual.

In 2011, Lord Hope of Craighead, then Deputy President of the UK Supreme Court, allegedly suggested that Scottish Judges were somewhat hostile to cases being reviewed on appeal to the Supreme Court in London. Lucy Adams of the Glasgow Herald reported him as saying: "There is [in England and Wales] none of the feeling of antipathy towards cases being sent to London that lies just below the surface here in Scotland." The Drum reported that the Supreme Court's head of communications had said that Hope was "totally misquoted" and had been unaware that the press were present, while the journalist rejected this and publicly offered to play back the recording. In his diaries, however, Hope states that the words reported by Lucy Adams were accurate and that he has never suggested otherwise; his objection was to the way in which the words, and he himself, were portrayed on the newspaper's front page under headlines including "The Scottish Court system is corrosively anti-English" and "Shock claim by Scottish Law Lord". These words were subsequently described by Lord Hope as misreported or never said, despite the journalist publicly offering a recording. The version of the speech Lord Hope of Craighead approved for posting on the Supreme Court website does not include the contested wording. Hope states that the headlines led to a complaint against him by the Lord President on behalf of the Scottish judges and to a request that he withdraw the remark, which is why that version does not include the words that led to the headlines.He maintained, in response, a complete news blackout at a subsequent speech-giving in Glasgow a month later. This speech was also described as "an unprecedented counter-attack on the Scottish Government for its assault on the jurisdiction of the Supreme Court earlier this year." He records, at page 121 of his diaries, that the Lord Advocate told him that the Scottish Government was well aware of the treatment that the lecture would receive from the newspaper, that the Lord Advocate's advice to the First Minister, Alex Salmond, was to make no comment, and that Salmond took that advice. According to Hope, none of the other Scottish newspapers followed up the story.

Lord Hope of Craighead's diaries have been analysed by academic writer Lewis Graham. He highlights three incidents as described by the diary writer, together establishing a "deeply concerning" possibility and pattern of judges being included or excluded from hearing a case based on the expected outcomes if they were to sit on it. Graham cites consideration by Hope of excluding Northern Irish Lord Kerr of Tonaghmore from a devolution case; and successful lobbying, according to Lord Hope of Craighead, by Lord Hoffmann to exclude Baroness Hale of Richmond from a Jamaican death penalty appeal. Additionally, Lord Judge asked, according to Lord Hope of Craighead, to be included in a miscarriage of justice case to further his pre-existing views. While accepting that the account of Lord Hope of Craighead could be doubted, Graham observed that the possibility of it being correct "strikes at the heart of judicial neutrality and procedural fairness".

In 2024, the Society of Legal Scholars published the results of an academic investigation through semi-structured interviews conducted with 13 very senior judicial figures from across the United Kingdom, some attributed and some anonymous. Lord Hope of Craighead's actions in disclosing judicial panel deliberations were a focus of the study. The interviewees widely condemned Lord Hope of Craighead's disclosures as a transgression due to breach of collegiality or loyalty to other judges, and as constituting inappropriate conduct of a former judge. Additionally, the publishing of confidential deliberations was widely seen as potentially threatening "the procedural and institutional legitimacy of the court." Only one person, Lord Brown of Eaton-under-Heywood, regarded Lord Hope of Craighead's disclosures as defensible.

A review of the diaries by a former High Court judge, Sir Ross Cranston FBA, responded to this criticism. Cranston noted that confidentiality is an important value for the independence of the judiciary and for confidence in it, and that at first blush the publication of the last three volumes breaches that value, but concluded that "confidentiality is always trumped by the public interest" and that the diaries are a record of how things are done, including judicial appointments and promotions.

== Notable cases ==
As Deputy President of the Supreme Court

- R (E) v Jewish Free School [2009] UKSC 1 – discrimination in school admissions on religious grounds
- R (L) v Commissioner of Police of the Metropolis [2009] UKSC 3 – criminal records checks and right to respect for private and family life
- BA (Nigeria) v Secretary of State [2009] UKSC 7 – right of appeal against deportation orders
- Gisda Cyf v Barratt [2010] UKSC 41 – employment contracts as against general contracts
- Cadder v HM Advocate [2010] UKSC 43 – police detention of suspects
- HJ and HT v Home Secretary [2010] UKSC 31 – homosexuality in asylum claims
- HM Treasury v Ahmed [2010] UKSC 2 – strikes Treasury Orders related to UNSC 1267 Committee
- Jones v Kaney [2011] UKSC 13 – immunity from suit of expert witnesses
- Fraser v HM Advocate [2011] UKSC 24 – role of the UK Supreme Court in Scots criminal law

As Lord of Appeal in Ordinary

- R v Woollin [1999] 1 AC 82 – indirect intention
- Lubbe v Cape Plc [2000] 1 WLR 1545 – tortious liability of shareholders
- Bruton v London and Quadrant Housing Trust [2000] 1 AC 406 – rights of landlords and tenants
- White v White [2001] 1 AC 596 – distribution of property on divorce
- DGFT v First National Bank plc [2001] UKHL 52 – unfair contractual terms and the construction of unreviewable core terms
- Wilson v First County Trust Ltd (No 2) [2003] UKHL 40 – impact of the Consumer Credit Act 1974 on pawnshop dealers' human rights
- Campbell v Mirror Group Newspapers Ltd [2004] UKHL 22 – right to privacy and confidentiality
- Chester v Afshar [2004] UKHL 41 – patients' right to give fully informed consent
- Archibald v Fife Council [2004] UKHL 32 – reasonable adjustments for the disabled
- Jackson v Royal Bank of Scotland [2005] UKHL 3 – remoteness
- Re Spectrum Plus Ltd [2005] UKHL 41 – definition of "floating charge"
- Jackson v Attorney General [2005] UKHL 56 – fox hunting ban
- J & H Ritchie Ltd v Lloyd Ltd [2007] UKHL 9 – Sale of Goods Act 1979, section 35 and measure of damages for poor quality after repair
- Stack v Dowden [2007] UKHL 17 – beneficial interest in the family home on divorce
- The Achilleas [2008] UKHL 48 – remoteness
- Austin v Commissioner of Police of the Metropolis [2009] UKHL 5 – kettling of protestors
- Chartbrook Ltd v Persimmon Homes Ltd [2009] UKHL 38 – influence of pre-contractual negotiations on construction

As Lord President

- Sharp v Thomson 1997 SC(HL) 66 – Scots property law
- West v Secretary of State for Scotland 1992 SC 385 – Scots judicial review

As Lord Justice General

- Jamieson v HM Advocate 1994 JC 88 – rape and consent
- Ross v HM Advocate 1991 JC 210 – automatism

== Honours and Arms ==
The Lord Hope of Craighead became Chancellor of the University of Strathclyde in 1998 and was appointed a Fellow in 2000. He stepped down as Chancellor in October 2013. He was awarded an honorary LL.D. by the university in 1993, and by the University of Aberdeen in 1991 and the University of Edinburgh in 1995.

In 2007, he was awarded the David Kelbie Award by the Institute of Contemporary Scotland. He was formerly an Honorary Professor of Law at the University of Aberdeen, and is an honorary member of the Canadian Bar Association (1987) and of The Society of Legal Scholars (1991), an Honorary Fellow of the American College of Trial Lawyers (2000), and an Honorary Bencher of Gray's Inn (1989) and of the Inn of Court of Northern Ireland (1995). He was also, as of 2008, the Honorary President of the Edinburgh Student Law Review.

On St Andrew's Day, 30 November 2009, Lord Hope of Craighead was appointed to the Order of the Thistle by Queen Elizabeth II. The Order of the Thistle is the highest chivalric honour in Scotland. In the UK as a whole it is second only to the Order of the Garter amongst chivalric orders. The order honours Scottish men and women who have held public office or who have contributed in some way to national life. Lord Hope of Craighead represented the Order at the 2023 Coronation.

Coat of arms of David Hope, Baron Hope of Craighead
Crest A broken terrestrial sphere Proper charged with an anchor Gules surmounted by a rainbow Proper. Escutcheon Azure on a chevron Or between three bezants a bay leaf between two quill pens Vert. Supporters Two blackfaced rams Proper. Motto Spes Non Est Fracta (My Hope Is Not Broken)

== See also ==
- List of Senators of the College of Justice
- Courts of Scotland
- Abu Dhabi Global Market Courts

== Notes ==
Legal offices
Preceded by The Lord Emslie	Lord Justice General and Lord President of the Court of Session; 1989–1996	Succeeded by The Lord Rodger of Earlsferry
Preceded by The Lord Jauncey of Tullichettle	Lord of Appeal in Ordinary; 1996–2009	Abolished
Preceded by The Lord Hoffmann	Second Senior Law Lord; 2009	Abolished
New creation	Deputy President of the Supreme Court of the United Kingdom; 2009–2013	Succeeded by The Baroness Hale of Richmond
Other offices
Preceded by The Lord Laming	Convenor of the Crossbench Peers; 2015–2019	Succeeded by The Lord Judge
Orders of precedence in the United Kingdom
Preceded by The Lord Tope	Gentlemen; Baron Hope of Craighead	Followed by The Lord Blyth of Rowington
