= John Cyril Smith =

British legal scholar (1922–2003)

Sir John Cyril Smith CBE, QC, FBA
- Born: 15 January 1922; Barnard Castle, County Durham, England
- Died: 14 February 2003 (aged 81); Nottingham, Nottinghamshire, England
- Education: Downing College, Cambridge
- Occupation: Legal Academic
- Organization: University of Nottingham
- Known for: Criminal law
- Notable work: Smith and Hogan's Criminal Law
- Military career
- Allegiance: United Kingdom
- Branch: British Army
- Rank: Captain
- Units: Royal Artillery

Sir John Cyril Smith CBE QC FBA (15 January 1922 – 14 February 2003), born Barnard Castle, County Durham, was an English legal academic. Smith was an authority on English criminal law and the philosophy of criminal liability. Together with Brian Hogan he was the author of Smith & Hogan's Criminal Law, which became the leading doctrinal text on criminal law in England and Wales. The textbook has been used as persuasive authority on crimes prosecuted in the law courts of England and Wales and elsewhere in the common law world. In 1998, Lord Bingham praised Smith; "whom most would gladly hail as the outstanding criminal lawyer of our time."

== Early life and education ==
Smith was educated at St Mary's Grammar School in Darlington. Brian Hogan, with whom he authored Smith and Hogan's Criminal Law, attended the same school. Smith won a scholarship to attend the University of Oxford to read history, but chose not to take it up, instead leaving school to join his father's engineering business. Smith then enrolled in the British Army, serving in the Royal Artillery during World War II, rising to the rank of Captain. It was whilst in the army that Smith developed an interest in the law; subsequently, he helped administer courts martial. After leaving the Army in 1947, Smith read law at Downing College, Cambridge, graduating with a First. In 1950 Smith was admitted to Lincoln's Inn and called to the Bar. In 1977 he became an Honorary Bencher of Lincoln's Inn.

== Academic career ==
Smith joined the Department of Law at the University of Nottingham in 1950 as an Assistant Lecturer in Law. Smith was appointed as the Head of the Department of Law in 1956, and was promoted to Professor of Law in 1957. Smith remained Head of the department for almost thirty years, briefly serving as the Pro-Vice-Chancellor of the university from 1973 to 1977. Smith also spent a year at Harvard University after being awarded a Commonwealth Fund Fellowship. Smith's time at Harvard influenced him to write A Casebook on Contract in 1955, alongside J.A.C. Thomas. The book is now in its fourteenth edition (2021). Andrew Ashworth says Smith was 'instrumental' in creating a 'formidable reputation' for the University of Nottingham in teaching law.

In 1954, Smith became a founding member of the editorial board of the Criminal Law Review, to which he would contribute frequently throughout his career. Smith's long association with the Criminal Law Review was notable for his frequent case commentaries, wherein Smith was unafraid to strongly criticise judgments. This led to a public rebuke from Lord Justice Lawton, though Smith did not back down. Smith was notable in the area of the criminal law on theft, writing a monograph titled "The Law of Theft" in 1968, now in its ninth edition (2007).

During the 1960s Smith was a co-opted member of the Criminal Law Revision Committee, being appointed member in the late 1970s. The resulting recommendations played an important part in the development of the Theft Acts of 1968 & 1978. Smith, in several Criminal Law Review case commentaries, was notably critical of the interpretations of the Theft Acts, particularly DPP v Gomez and R v Hinks. Smith was an advocate for a criminal code of England and Wales (an English Criminal Code) working on a draft criminal code in the early 1980s, which was adopted by the Law Commission in 1989. The code has not yet been adopted, which, during his lifetime, was to the great disappointment of Professor Smith.

Smith noted that the 'only subject he had taught every year throughout his career was evidence.' Smith wrote the book "Criminal Evidence" published by Sweet & Maxwell (1 June 1995).

Smith was elected as a fellow of the British Academy in 1973. He was made QC in 1973 and knighted in 1993 for 'services to legal education.'

== Personal life and death ==
Smith was married to Shirley Walters, they had two sons and one daughter.

Smith died in Nottingham on 14 February 2003.
