= Judicial review in Scotland =

Judicial review in Scotland is a part of United Kingdom constitutional law that functions within the framework of Scots administrative law.

The power of judicial review of all actions of governmental and private bodies in Scotland is held by the Court of Session. The procedure is governed by Chapter 58 of the Rules of Court.

Approximately 600 judicial review cases are raised every year, but most are settled by agreement with only a small minority having to be decided by the court.

== Procedure ==
There is a 3-month time limit on seeking judicial review (see Courts Reform (Scotland) Act 2014), although if proper administration is prejudiced by delay on the part of the pursuer, the court may exercise its discretion and refuse to grant a review.

Despite the procedural differences, the substantive laws regarding the grounds of judicial review in Scotland are similar to those in other western legal systems, with decisions in one jurisdiction regarded as highly persuasive in the others. There is, however, one substantial difference in Scotland since there is no distinction between review of a public body and a private body, which is different from, for example, judicial review in England and Wales, where review is only possible in the case of a public body or a quasi-public body (West v. Secretary of State for Scotland).

Generally, review is confined to purely procedural grounds (the official action was illegal or improper), although the court will also sanction decisions which are, in substance, so unreasonable that no reasonable decision-maker could have reached it (so-called Wednesbury unreasonableness). A more rigorous standard of substantive review is applied where the matter complained of touches upon the pursuer's rights in terms of the Human Rights Act 1998.
