= David Perry (barrister) =

David Perry KC is a senior English criminal barrister. In January 2021 The Times repeated an assertion in its headline that he was "a source of shame" for prosecuting Hong Kong democracy campaigners. The Hong Kong Department of Justice announced on 20 January 2021 that Perry had decided to withdraw from the case.

== Biography ==
Perry graduated with an LLB from the University of Leicester, was called to the bar in 1980 at Lincoln's Inn, and took silk in 2006.

Perry is known for taking a major role in several high-profile political cases in Hong Kong. He represented the Hong Kong Department of Justice in its prosecution of former Chief Executive Donald Tsang over allegations of misconduct in public office.

=== Prosecution of Hong Kong pro-democracy activists ===
In January 2021, he was hired by the department to prosecute the case against Jimmy Lai, the media businessman and owner-publisher of the Hong Kong Apple Daily, and eight other pro-democracy opposition figures for their roles in street protests against crackdowns by the Communist government in August 2019 in light of the 2019–20 Hong Kong protests. Among the other defendants are “Father of Democracy” Martin Lee Chu-ming QC SC JP, the Tiananmen Square vigil organiser Lee Cheuk-yan, the veteran activist “Long Hair” Leung Kwok-hung who is the vice-chairman of the pro-democracy Hong Kong Labour Party and Albert Ho, a veteran liberal.

Perry's decision has been challenged by the chair of the foreign affairs select committee, Tom Tugendhat, and by the Labour peer Lord Adonis. This was followed by a joint statement on 14 January 2021 from the foreign ministers of Australia, the US, Britain and Canada expressing “serious concern” about the arrests of over 50 pro-democracy opposition figures in Hong Kong. “It is clear that the national security law is being used to eliminate dissent and opposing political views”, the countries’ four foreign ministers said.

Also on 14 January, Sir Malcolm Rifkind criticised Perry's judgment, writing that it "is clear to me from the circumstances" that the trial "is taking place because of the determination of the Chinese government to destroy the pro-democracy movement in Hong Kong." Rifkind reminded readers that "Lady Hale, the former president of the Supreme Court, admitted she would have 'a serious moral question to ask myself' if she agreed to sit on the bench in Hong Kong cases."

On 17 January, foreign secretary Dominic Raab, interviewed by Sophy Ridge on Sky, said: "I don’t understand how anyone of good conscience, from the world-leading legal profession that we have, would take a case where they will have to apply the national security legislation at the behest of the authorities in Beijing, which is directly violating, undermining the freedom of the people of Hong Kong [...] I understand in the case of Mr Perry, in relation to the pro-democracy activists, and of course from Beijing’s point of view, this would be a serious PR coup. There is no doubt in my mind that under the Bar code of ethics a case like this could be resisted and frankly, I think people watching this would regard it as pretty mercenary to be taking up that kind of case."

In a statement on 20 January, the Hong Kong Department of Justice announced that Perry had decided to withdraw from the case due to his concerns about negative responses from the British community, and the waiver of the quarantine requirement. It pointed out that "ill-informed" criticism had "conflated" the cases with the national security law, apparently referring to the statement of Raab; the cases were not to be prosecuted under that law.
