= George Andrews =

George Andrews may refer to:

== Arts and entertainment ==
- George Townsend Andrews (1804–1855), English architect noted for his railway buildings
- George Arliss (a.k.a. George Andrews, 1868–1946), English actor, playwright and filmmaker
- George Andrews (artist) (1911–1996), American self-taught artist
- Kostas Andritsos (a.k.a. George Andrews, 1916–1993) Greek film director and writer
- George Lee Andrews (born 1942), American actor and singer

== Law and politics ==
- George Andrews (barrister) (fl. 1776), English barrister
- George Rex Andrews (1808–1873), U.S. Representative from New York
- George H. Andrews (1821–1885), New York politician
- George Andrews (judge) (1826–1889), Tennessee Supreme Court justice
- George William Andrews (Canadian politician) (1869–1943), Canadian politician and real estate agent
- George W. Andrews (1906–1971), U.S. Representative from Alabama
- George Henry Andrews (1926–1997), Liberian sports journalist and politician
- George Roberts Andrews (1932–2010), American diplomat
- George Pierce Andrews (1835–1902), New York Supreme Court Justice

== Military ==
- George Leonard Andrews (1828–1899), Union army general of the American Civil War
- George Lippitt Andrews (1828–1920), United States Army officer
- George Andrews (adjutant general) (1850–1928), Adjutant General of the U.S. Army

== Sports ==
- George Grey Andrews (1880–1952), New Zealand yacht designer, racer and naval officer
- George Andrews (rugby) (1904–1989), Welsh rugby league and international rugby union player
- George "Porky" Andrews (1917–1999), Canadian basketball player
- George Andrews (footballer) (born 1942), English footballer
- George Andrews (American football) (born 1955), American football player

== Others ==
- George Andrews (bishop) (1564–1648), Anglican priest
- George Andrews (mathematician) (born 1938), American mathematician working in analysis and combinatorics
- George Reid Andrews, American historian
