= New Benloe =

Les Reports des divers resolutions et judgement donne par les de la Ley en le Temps del Reigne de Hen. VIII., Edw. VI., and Mar. Eliz. Jac. I. et Car. I. is the title of a collection of nominate reports, by Gulielme Bendloe, of cases decided between approximately 1531 and 1628. For the purpose of citation, their name may be abbreviated to "Benl". They are reprinted in volume 73 of the English Reports.

In 1847, J. G. Marvin said:

Several different copies of Bendloe's Reports have been published. It appears that extracts and abridgments from the original manuscript were made by different person's, and published as Bendloe's Reports. John Rowe, who edited Bendloe's Reports and published with them Dalison's, says of the former: "In one copy which I have there are in all two hundred and forty cases, which are many more than are in the best former edition; in another, there are but about one hundred cases, and that was my Lord Coke's own copy, which he used and noted with his own hand; and it is manifest that these different copies were but notes and extracts from the original, wherein such as collected them made use of their own judgements in the manner of abridging and in the choice of the cases." Some of the cases reported by Bendloe and Dalison, will be found at the end of Ash's Tables and Keilway's Reports. The edition of 1689, by Rowe, is the most accurate and desirable. Bendloe's Reports were formerly much cited, and that they "contain notable matters and resolutions in law, profitable to be known and fit for argument, doth evidently appear even by that great Rabbi of the law, Sir Edward Coke, in the arguing of whose reports (and also in his Institutes,) no small authority is given to those of our author." In the edition of 1661, there are several mistakes in the paging. Pref. to Bendloe and Dalison's Reports; Bridgman's Leg. Bib.; Wallaces's Reporters.

He also says of "Benloe's or Bendloe's Reports":

The first edition of Benloe's Reports was printed in 1661, and is referred to as New Benloe, to distinguish it from some cases of Benloe, before extant at the end of Ashe's Tables. The latter cases are often referred to as Old Benloe. There is some confusion in the references to the edition of 1661, and that of 1689, arising from lacuna in the paging of the older edition. N. B. Benloe is referred to both by Placitum and Page.
