= Ambler's Reports =

Reports of cases in the High Court of Chancery, with some few in other courts, from 1737 to 1783 is the title of a collection of nominate reports, by Charles Ambler, of cases decided by the Court of Chancery between approximately 1737 and 1784. For the purpose of citation their name may be abbreviated to "Amb". They are reprinted in volume 27 of the English Reports.

J. G. Marvin said:

These Reports, as originally published by the author, were not what the profession had a right to expect from a lawyer of Mr. Ambler's experience and abilities. In the preface to his Reports he says: "This work, I am aware, derives its only pretentions to merit, from being an accurate relation of facts, and opinions of great men presiding in courts of justice." The accuracy on which the reporter prides himself, has not been granted to him by the profession, which affords but another example of the inability of authors always to judge of their own productions. "His Reports are well known to be an extremely careless and imperfect production. The facts of most of the cases are stated shortly and defectively; in many, the dicta of the judges, in some, even the points themselves have been erroneously reported. The only notice which some of the most important cases in the book have received, is a short memorandum of the point determined. The notes taken in the earlier part of his life, evidently bear few marks of subsequent revision; and the frequent discovery of errors has given a reputation for inaccuracy to the publication." Mr. Blunt has corrected the errors of Ambler, by means of the Registrar's Book, and by comparing the Reports with contemparaneous manuscript reports, and thus has very much added to the reputation and authority of the work. Ambler's Reports embrace a period of forty years, and contain many of the decisions of those great Chancellors, Lords Hardwicke and Northington. Atkyns, Dickens, Barnadiston, Vessey, sen., and Eden, have also reported the decisions of these learned Chancellors. 12 Leg. Observer, 524; 1 Kent's Com. 460; Preface to Vol.1. Eden's Reports.
