= Andrews' Reports =

Reports of cases in the Court of King's Bench, in the 11 and 12 years of Geo. II. is the title of a collection of nominate reports, by George Andrews, of cases decided in the Court of King's Bench between approximately 1738 and 1739. For the purpose of citation their name may be abbreviated to "Andr". They are reprinted in volume 95 of the English Reports.

J. G. Marvin said:

Many of the cases contained in these Reports are also reported by Strange, and in cases tempore Lord Hardwicke. Andrews, however, has usually given a fuller and more satisfactory report of these cases, than is found in reports of this period. His reports are "accurate, judicious and satisfactory." The first edition was in folio, 1754. See Wallace's Reporters, 63. 2d ed.
