= Aleyn's Reports =

Collection of nominate reports, by John Aleyn

Select Cases in the K. B. in 22d, 23d, and 24th years of Charles I., with the names of the learned Counsel who argued the same is the title of a collection of nominate reports, by John Aleyn, of cases decided by the Court of King's Bench between approximately 1646 and 1649. For the purpose of citation, their name may be abbreviated to "Al". They are reprinted in volume 82 of the English Reports.

J. G. Marvin said:

These Reports consist of loose notes of cases taken during the last years of the reign of Charles I. when judicial proceedings were greatly interrupted by the troubles of the times. "During the whole period to which these Reports apply, Roll and Bacon were the only judge's of the Court of King's Bench, and in one term the former judge sat alone. Reports of legal decisions, under such circumstances, cannot, of course, be of much authority. The work is a posthumous publication, and the manuscript from which the printed copy was executed is said not to be the original." In 2 Shower, 164, Mr. Justice Dolben took occasion to say "the publisher had much wronged the author, for that he had the original manuscript, and had compared them, and found it to be mistaken in several cases, even as to the very resolutions of the Court." Of the reporter himself, nothing is known. Lord North, in his license for printing the volume, characterises Aleyn as a learned and judicious author, but from the fact that his name does not appear in the printed Reports of the time in which he lived, it is thought that he was not a man of much legal eminence. Verb. Aleyn, Biog. Dic. of Soc. W. S. Knowledge. Wallace's Reporters, 38. 2d ed.
