= Sir William Blackstone's Reports =

English legal reports, 1746–79

Reports in K.B. and C.P., from 1746 to 1779 is the title of a collection of nominate reports, by Sir William Blackstone, of cases decided between approximately 1746 and 1780. For the purpose of citation their name may be abbreviated to "Black W" or "Bl W". They are in two volumes. They are reprinted in volume 96 of the English Reports.

In 1847, John Gage Marvin said:

With respect to these reports, as they neither possess nor claim any merit other than that of fidelity and accuracy, so they are neither much better nor much worse than any other reports. The cases that compose the first volume commence with the reporter's admission to the bar, whose attendance upon the Courts was subsequently much interrupted by his call to Oxford. The second volume is by far the most valuable, since it contains an unbroken series of decisions of the Court of Common Pleas during the time the author sat as one of the judges. It is pretty much generally acknowledged that the publication of these volumes has not added much to the literary reputation of Blackstone. "The first volume is inferior to Burrows, and the second not superior to Wilson." Lord Mansfield impugned their accuracy, and Mr. Justice Lewis says of them, "though the production of an able judge, they are not of the highest authority." The last edition of these reports was ably edited by Elsley, and they are now cited with pretty general favour and respect. The editions are, 2 vols. folio, London, 1780; 2 vols., 8vo., 1781, Dublin, 1789, and the above. Wallace's Reporters, 65; 67 Monthly Review, 10; Douglas, 93, n; 1 Johnson's Cases, 45.
