= Benloe and Dalison's Reports =

Les Reports des divers Cases en le Court del Common Bank, en le several Reignes de Hen. VII., Hen. VIII., Edw. VI., et Mar. et Eliz. is a collection of nominate reports, attributed to Gulielme Benloe and Gulielme Dalison, of cases decided by the Court of Common Pleas between approximately 1486 and 1580. For the purpose of citation, their name may be abbreviated to "Ben & D". They are reprinted in volume 123 of the English Reports.

John Bouvier said "Benloe & Dalison's Reports" refers to "Reports and Pleadings in Common Pleas, in the reigns of K. Henry VII., Henry VIII., Edward VI., and Queens Mary and Elizabeth. By William Benloe and William Dalison."

J. G. Marvin said of the abbreviation "Ben & D" of "Benloe and Dalison":

Dalison's Reports are sometimes bound with Benloe's, hence this abbreviation.

== Dalison's Reports ==
J G Marvin also said, in the same book of 1847:

DALISON, GULIELME. Reports des divers Cases adjugez en la Court del Common Bank, en les regnes des Roys Hen. VIII., Edw. VI., et les Reines Marie et Eliz. fol. London. 1689. Dalison's Reports were collected and published with Benloe's by John Rowe, and some of the Cases had also previously appeared at the end of Ashe's Tables, as well as appended to Keilwey's Reports. Those at the end of Ashe, are the same as those at the end of Keilwey, but in the latter they have many references which are not in the former. Serjeant Hendon cited Dalison, from Ashe, in a case before Lord Hobart, when the judge "demanded of him by what authority those Reports of Dalison came into print." With Benloe's, they afterwards came into print under the imprimatur of Judges Wright, Herbert, and Atkins. Of Dalison little is known, and his Reports long since ranked among the antiquities of the law, and are now almost obsolete and valueless. Winch's Rep. 43; Pref. Cro. Eliz.; Pref. Benloe & Dalison; Bridg. Leg. Bib. 182.

He also said of the abbreviation "A B" of "Anonymous Benloe":

This abbreviation refers to a Collection of Cases adjudged in the reigns of Henry VIII., Edward VI., and Mary and Elizabeth. They were collected by William Dalison, and are sometimes cited as Dalison's Reports. Being frequently bound with Benloe's Reports, sufficiently explains the abbreviation. Notes of some of these cases may also be found in Ash's Tables and at the end of Keilway's Reports.
