= Henry Blackstone's Reports =

Reports in Common Pleas and Exchequer, from E.T. 28 G. III., 1788, to H.T. 36 G. III., 1796 is the title of a collection of nominate reports, by Henry Blackstone, the nephew of Sir William Blackstone, of cases decided between approximately 1788 and 1796. For the purpose of citation their name may be abbreviated to "Bl H". They are in two volumes. They are reprinted in volume 126 of the English Reports.

John Gage Marvin said:

"The reporter has uniformly confined his attention to points of real importance, and throughout his work evinces much accuracy and fidelity, with as great a degree of conciseness as is consistent with perspicuity." The editions are, 2 vols., folio, London, 1793, 1796; 3d edition, with additional notes, 2 vols., 8vo., 1701; 4th ed., 2 vols., 8vo., 1827; and 2 vols., 8vo., Philadelphia, 1808-9.

== See also ==
- Anstruther's Reports
