= Atkyns' Reports =

Reports of Cases argued and determined in the High Court of Chancery, in the time of Lord Hardwicke, from 1737 to 1754 is the title of a collection of nominate reports, by John Tracy Atkyns, of cases decided by the Court of Chancery between approximately 1736 and 1755. For the purpose of citation their name may be abbreviated to "Atk". They are in three volumes. They are reprinted in volume 26 of the English Reports.

== Authority and accuracy ==
J. G. Marvin said:

These Reports have had the misfortune to be often condemned, and yet no Equity Reports have been much oftener cited. The reporter is belabored for inaccuracy, yet he tells us, in the preface to volume second, that he has been at the trouble and expense of comparing his notes with the Register, "and have, in those instances where I thought it was necessary, taken the state of the case from thence, and in some of the nicest material, have given the substance of the decree," which examination is given by Mr. Sanders, the confessedly able editor of these Reports, who says: "The editor must take this opportunity, however, of observing, that he has frequently experienced his researches in the Register's Books anticipated by the previous labours of Mr. Atkyns. That gentleman, before the publication of his Reports, had certainly compared many of them with the records; and this is evident, not only from his own declaration in the preface to his second volume, but more especially as many of his statements of cases and decrees thereupon are taken, almost verbatim, from the Register's Books." The reporter informs us that he was not able to procure a full statement of all the cases cum aliis pertinentibus, "for where the court have been of opinion to dismiss the plaintiff's bill, the register has only made a minute of the dismission, and the case at large has not been entered in the report office, the parties in the suit choosing not to be at the expense of it." - and yet this is attributed to the reporter's inaccuracy and want of fulness in his statements of cases, which has been reiterated from the time of Lord Mansfield down to 1846, without one saving clause in the allegations. Mr. Kyd, in his sapience, has surpassed all of the villifiers of Atkyns' Reports, in his sweeping charges - "In Atkyns and Vesey there is hardly ever a state of the facts given to render the arguments of the counsel and the judgement of his lordship intelligible. The reader is left to collect, from the allusions of each, such an imperfect state of the case as he can, and frequently to supply from conjecture, something to render it consistent with itself; and his lordship's judgement is generally reported in a manner so confused, and in language so vague and incorrect, that it is difficult to establish upon it any general principle."

Any lawyer who has thumbed these Reports at all, knows that this statement must be taken cum grano salis, and from what has already been stated the reporter's conciseness, in many cases, is not his fault, and he was obliged to give such a report of them as he has given or none at all. It is possible that some of the elder remarks, versus Atkyns, were levelled at him because he did not choose to trouble the judges for their imprimatur, which was usually done by the reporters of his and the preceding time, and which was thought to be a sine qua non in order to give a sort of currency to their labours. Perhaps this will explain what Lord Mansfield is reported to have said: "Atkyns must not be cited as an authority." One can only add, Tantæne animis cælestibus iræ? Mr. Atkyns, however, very properly and frankly gives his reason for not so doing - "They (the judges) could not, from their situation, be supposed to examine the manuscript with any accuracy before it was printed; and, therefore, to solicit them to give the sanction of their names to a performance with which they were entirely unaquainted, in my opinion, would have been paying their lordships a very ill complement; and I chose rather, after a complete and candid examination of these reports, they should either rise or fall in the esteem of the public, according to their real and intrinsic merit only." Having now considered all the parties I have met with versus, let us next examine all the authorities pro Atkins. Buller, J., strongly intimates, that if there are some defects in the reports of Lord Hardwicke's decisions, the fault may not be wholly attributed to the reporters, for, says he, "perhaps even Lord Hardwicke himself, by being very diffuse, has laid a foundation for doubts which otherwise would never have existed." Chancellor Kent, after speaking of the reporters of Lord Hardwicke's decisions, concludes by saying, "yet the value of his opinions, and the great extent of his learning, and the solidity of his judgement have been sufficiently perceived and understood." In an able article reviewing I. Atkyns' Reports, the writer says, "with regard, however, to the volume now before us it is but justice to acknowledge that the cases are very fully and accurately stated." Mr. Lloyd, in his lectures on equity before the Incorporated Law Society, remarks: "But the principal and fullest reports of Lord Hardwicke's decisions, are undoubtedly to be found in Atkyns and Vesey, Sen. These are books of constant reference; in them are to be found full and elaborate expositions of the principles not only of Equity, but also many parts of the Common Law."

The editor, Mr. Sanders, who certainly had ample means of ascertaining the correctness and fidelity of the Reports under consideration, frankly gives his unequivocal testimony in Atkyns' favor. He declares that only "in some very few instances a slight alteration in the original text has been adopted, with a view of making it correspond with the Register." Lord Hardwicke, as a judge, stands unsurpassed, and with scarcely an equal in the annals of judicial history. "His decisions at this day, and in our own courts, do undoubtedly carry with them a more commanding weight of authority than those of any other judge; and the best editions of the elder Vesey and Atkyns will continue to fix the attention and study of succeeding ages."

From the foregoing illustrations I think that we may reasonably conclude that Atkyns' Reports are as correct as the records and sources from which they were prepared would admit of, and that the accuracy, fidelity, and method of the reporter have been, by certain persons, undeservedly underrated. It is perhaps needless to add, that the learned author of "Uses and Trusts" has very much increased the value of these Reports, by his labors as an editor of them. 2 Atk. Pref. 4; 1 Atk. Pref 5; 2 Atk. Pref. 4; Wallace's Reporters, 79; 2 Wooddesson's Lec. 362; 5 Taunton, 64; 1 Barn. & Ald. 742 - "part of the second edition was very incorrectly printed," which surely was not the reporter's fault; 2 Kyd on Corporations, 189, n.; 1 W. Blk. Rep. 571; 2 Atk. Pref. 5; 6 East, 29, n.; 1 Kent, 493; 33 Monthly Rev. 108; 12 Leg. Obs. 524; 1 Atk. Rep. 5; 2 Kent, 493.
