= Anstruther's Reports =

Reports of cases in the Court of Exchequer, from E.T. 32, Geo. III., to T.T. 37, Geo. III. is the title of a collection of nominate reports, by Alexander Anstruther, of cases decided by the Court of Exchequer Chamber and the House of Lords between approximately 1792 and 1797. For the purpose of citation their name may be abbreviated to "Anst". They are in three volumes. They are reprinted in volume 145 of the English Reports.

J. G. Marvin said:

In these Reports will be found some cases determined in the House of Lords, and in the Exchequer Chamber. Henry Blackstone had reported the latter, but Mr. Anstruther having taken notes of these cases, which differ somewhat from Blackstone's Reports of the same, has thought proper to insert them. Anstruther's Reports are carefully and accurately compiled, and have always been considered as good authority.
