= Barnes' Notes of Practice =

Nominate reports by Henry Barnes

Notes of Cases in points of practice, taken in the Court of Common Pleas, from M.T. 1732, to H.T. 1756, inclusive. To which is added a continuation of cases to the end of the reign of Geo. II. is the title of a collection of nominate reports, by Henry Barnes, of cases decided between approximately 1732 and 1760.

They are also known as Barnes' Notes of Practice. For the purpose of citation, their name may be abbreviated to "Barnes". They are reprinted in volume 94 of the English Reports.

J. G. Marvin said:

The cases in this volume are very briefly reported, and are not always to be relied upon. Indeed it could hardly be expected, in a volume containing more than 2500 cases, upon points of practice decided by various judges, whose opinions were not always coincident, that there would be uniformity and agreement throughout. Perhaps, therefore, the occasional inaccuracies may be in part attributed to the noddings of the Court as well as the Reporter. Barnes has the reputation of, in general, reporting the cases with accuracy, and upon points of practice he is tolerably good authority. The different editions are, 2 vols., 8vo, 1754; 56, 4to., 1772; 8vo., Dublin, 1788; 8vo., London, 1790. The paging of the octavo and quarto editions do not agree. 1 B. & P. 333, (3)245; 1 Chitty's Reports, 233; 2 Johnson's Ch. Ca. 69; 1 Wyatts, 490.
