= Nominate reports =

Collections of English law reports

The nominate reports, also known as nominative reports, named reports and private reports, are the various published collections of law reports of cases in English courts from the Middle Ages to the 1860s.

Most (but not all) are reprinted in the English Reports. They are described as "nominate" (named) in order to distinguish them from the Year Books, which are anonymous.

An example of a nominate report is Edmund F. Moore's Reports of Cases Heard and Determined by the Judicial Committee and the Lords of His Majesty's most Honourable Privy Council on Appeal from the Supreme and Sudder Dewanny Courts in the East Indies, published in London from 1837 to 1873, referred to as Moore's Indian Appeals and cited for example as: Moofti Mohummud Ubdoollah v. Baboo Mootechund 1 M.I.A. 383.

In the 1860s, law reporting in England was taken over by the Incorporated Council of Law Reporting, ending the practice of nominate reports.

== List ==
- Acton
- Addams
- Adolphus and Ellis
- Aleyn
- Ambler
- Anderson
- Andrews
- Anstruther
- Atkyns
- Barnardiston's Chancery Reports
- Barnardiston's King's Bench Reports
- Barnes
- Barnewall and Adolphus
- Barnewall and Alderson
- Barnewall and Cresswell
- Beavan
- Bell
- Bellewe
- Benloe
- Benloe and Dalison
- Best and Smith
- Bingham
- Bingham, New Cases
- Blackstone, Henry
- Blackstone, William
- Bligh
- Bligh, New Series
- Bosanquet and Puller
- Bosanquet and Puller, New Reports
- Bridgman, Sir J.
- Bridgeman, Sir O.
- Broderip and Bingham
- Brook's New Cases
- Browning and Lushington
- Brown's Chancery Cases (Belt)
- Brown's Parliament Cases
- Brownlow and Goldsborough
- Bulstrode
- Bunberry
- Burrell
- Burrow
- Calthorpe
- Campbell
- Carrington and Kirwan
- Carrington and Marsham
- Carrington and Payne
- Carter
- Carthew
- Cary
- Cases in Chancery
- Choyce Cases in Chancery
- Clark and Finelly
- Coke's Reports
- Colles
- Collyer
- Comberbach
- The Common Bench Reports
- The Common Bench Reports, New Series
- Comyns
- Cooke
- Cooper's Practice Cases
- Cooper, G
- Cooper, temp Brougham
- Cooper, temp Cottenham
- Cowper
- Cox
- Craig and Phillips
- Croke, Eliz.
- Croke, Jac.
- Croke, Car.
- Crompton and Jervis
- Crompton and Meeson
- Crompton, Meeson and Roscoe
- Cunningham
- Curteis
- Daniell
- Davis, Ireland
- Deane and Swabey
- Dearsly
- Dearsly and Bell
- De Gex, Fisher and Jones
- De Gex, Jones and Smith
- De Gex, M'Naghten and Gorden
- De Gex and Smale
- Denison
- Dickens
- Dodson
- Donnelly
- Douglas
- Dow
- Dow and Clark
- Dowling and Ryland
- Drewry
- Drewry and Smale
- Dyer
- East
- Eden
- Edwards
- Ellis and Blackburn
- Ellis and Blackburn and Ellis
- Ellis and Ellis
- Equity Cases Abridged
- Espinasse's Reports
- The Exchequer Reports (Welsby, Hurlstone and Gordon)
- Fitzgibbon
- Forrest
- Fortescue
- Foster's Crown Cases
- Foster and Finlason
- Freeman's Chancery Reports
- Freeman's King's Bench Reports
- Giffard
- Gibert's Cases in Law and Equity
- Gilbert
- Godbolt
- Gouldsborough
- Gow
- Haggard's Admiralty Reports
- Haggard's Consistory Reports
- Haggard's Ecclesiastical Reports
- Hall and Twells
- Hardes
- Hardwicke, cases temp
- Hare
- Hay and Marriott
- Hemming and Miller
- Hetley
- Hobart
- Holt, Nisi Prius
- Holt, Equity
- Holt, King's Bench
- House of Lords Cases (Clark)
- Hurlstone and Coltman
- Hurlstone and Newman
- Hutton
- Jacob
- Jacob and Walker
- Jenkins (Eight centuries of cases)
- Johnson
- Johnson and Hemming
- Jones, T
- Jones, W
- Kay
- Kay and Johnson
- Keble
- Keen
- Keilway
- Kelyng
- Kenyon
- Knapp
- Lane
- Latch
- Leach
- Lee
- Leigh and Cave
- Leonard
- Levinz
- Lewin's Crown Cases on the Northern Circuit
- Ley
- Lilly-Assize
- Littleton
- Lofft
- Lushington
- Lutwyche
- Maclaen and Robinson
- M'Cleland
- M'Cleland and Younge
- M'Naghten and Gordon
- Maddock
- Manning and Granger
- March, New Cases
- Maule and Selwyn
- Meeson and Welsby
- Merivale
- The Modern Reports
- Moody's Crown Cases Reserved
- Moody and Malkin
- Moody and Robinson
- Moore, King's Bench
- Moore, Privy Council
- Moore, Privy Council, New Series
- Moore's Indian Appeals
- Mosely
- Mylne and Craig
- Mylne and Keen
- Nelson
- Noy
- Owen
- Palmer
- Parker
- Peake
- Peake, Additional Cases
- Peere Williams
- Philimore
- Phillips
- Plowden's Commentaries
- Pollexfen
- Popham
- Port
- Precedents in Chancery (T Finch)
- Price
- The Queen's Bench Reports
- Lord Raymond's Reports
- Raymond, Sir T
- Reports in Chancery
- Reports, temp Finch
- Ridgeway, temp Hardwicke
- Robertson
- Robinson, C
- Robinson, W
- Rolle
- Russell
- Russell and Mylne
- Russell and Ryan
- Ryan and Moody
- Salkfield
- Saunders (edition by Peere Williams is called William's Saunders)
- Saville
- Sayer
- Searle and Smith
- Select Cases, temp King
- Session Cases
- Shower, House of Lords
- Shower, King's Bench
- Siderfin
- Simons
- Simons, New Series
- Simons and Stuart
- Skinner
- Smale and Giffard
- Spelman
- Spinks
- Spinks' Prize Cases
- Starkie
- The State Trials (Cobbett and Howell)
- The State Trials, New Series (Macdonell)
- Strange
- Style
- Swabey
- Swabey and Tristram
- Swanston
- Talbot, cases temp
- Tamyln
- Taunton
- The Term Reports (Durnford and East)
- Tothill
- Turner and Russell
- Vaughan
- Ventris
- Vernon
- Vesey Senior
- Vesey Senior, supplement by Belt
- Vesey Junior
- Vesey Junior, supplement by Hovenden
- Vesey and Beams
- West
- West, temp Hardwicke
- Wightwick
- Willes
- Wilmot
- Wilson
- Wilson, Chancery
- Wilson, King's Bench
- Winch
- Yelverton
- Younge
- Younge and Collyer
- Younge and Collyer C C
- Younge and Jervis

== See also ==
- Law report: England and Wales
