= Anderson's Reports =

Les Reports des mults principals cases en le temps del jadis roign Eliz., cibien en le common bank, come devant touts les Judges de cest Roialme (English: Reports of Many Principal Cases Argued and Adjudged in the Time of Queen Elizabeth, in the Common Bench) is the title of a collection of nominate reports, by Sir Edmund Anderson, of cases decided by the Court of Common Pleas between approximately 1534 and 1605. For the purpose of citation their name may be abbreviated to "And". They are in two volumes. Both volumes are reprinted in volume 123 of the English Reports.

In 1847, J. G. Marvin said:

These Reports have always been in fair repute, and are still regarded as good authority in Westminster Hall. They consist of notes of cases taken while the reporter was at the bar, and after he was raised to the bench. His report of Chudleigh's case is said to be much better than Lord Coke's. "Chief Justice Anderson was a profound and industrious lawyer; and it is evident from the reports of proceedings in the Court of Common Pleas at this time, that he was assiduous in his attendance, and singularly ready in the application of his great learning to the legal questions which were moved before him." Sugden on Powers, 6th ed. 22.
