= Barnardiston's King's Bench Reports =

Reports of Cases in the Court of King's Bench, together with some other cases from T. T. 12 Geo. I., to T. T. 7 Geo. II., from 1726 - 31 is the title of a collection of nominate reports, by Thomas Barnardiston, of cases decided by the Court of King's Bench between approximately 1726 and 1735. For the purpose of citation, their name may be abbreviated to "Barn KB". They are in two volumes. They are reprinted in volume 94 of the English Reports.

J. G. Marvin said:

These volumes have been repeatedly denounced, and yet they are frequently cited. The cases, for the most part, are briefly reported, and were taken between the years 1726 and 1734, in the early part of Barnardiston's professional life. However, the accuracy of some of the reported cases is corroborated by a comparison of contemporary reporters, and Lord Kenyon appears to have given them their true value when he observed that they were not "of much authority in general." 8 D. & E. 48; 1 East, 644, n.; Dang. 333, 689, n. n.
