= Espinasse's Reports =

Nominate reports by Isaac Espinasse

Espinasse's Reports, formally titled Reports of Cases argued and ruled at Nisi Prius, in the Courts of King's Bench and Common Pleas, from E. T., 33 Geo. III, to T. T. 47 Geo. III, is a collection of nominate reports by Isaac Espinasse, of nisi prius cases decided between 1793 and 1807. They are in six volumes. They may be cited as "Esp.".

== Reprints ==
These reports are reprinted in volume 170 of the English Reports.

== Accuracy ==
Glanville Williams said that this set of nominate reports has received more criticism related to their accuracy than any of the others. When a case from these reports was cited before Denman C.J., he said:

I am tempted to remark for the benefit of the profession, that Espinasse's Reports, in days nearer their own time, when their want of accuracy is better known than it is now, were never quoted without doubt and hesitation; and a special reason was often given as an apology for citing that particular case. Now they are often cited as if counsel thought them of equal authority with Lord Coke's Reports.

Pollock C.B. said that Espinasse only heard half of what went on in court and reported the other half. When a case from these reports was cited before Maule J. he said that he did not care for Espinasse "or any other ass".

Ashton said that:

More decorous, though not more learned judges than Maule always insisted that the fifth Espinasse must not be cited and would hardly admit even the earlier volumes.

and that Espinasse went downhill as he got older.
