= R v Pritchard =

R v Pritchard (1836) 7 C. & P. 303, remains a leading case in the law of England and Wales on assessing a defendant's fitness to plead.

The ruling reported is that of Edward Hall Alderson, cited as Alderson B. by reference to his honorary title of Baron. The case is within the Carrington & Payne's Nisi Prius Reports which are no longer widely available.

Pritchard, the defendant accused of bestiality, was deaf and mute. The importance of the case was the setting out of the following questions for the jury to answer in determining a defendant's sanity:

There are three points to be enquired into:- first, whether the prisoner is mute of malice or not; secondly, whether he can plead to the indictment or not; thirdly, whether he is of sufficient intellect to comprehend the course of the proceedings in the trial so as to make a proper defence - to know that he might challenge any of you [the jury] to whom he may object - and to comprehend the details of the evidence, which in a case of this nature must constitute a minute investigation.

— As cited in R v Moyle

If there was no sure way to communicate to the defendant the details of the evidence so that he could understand them and be able properly to advance his defence then the jury ought to find that he was not of sane mind.
