= John Shipton (surgeon) =

English surgeon (1680–1748)

- Born: 1680
- Died: 17 September 1748 (aged 67–68)
- Occupation: Surgeon

John Shipton (1680 – 17 September 1748) was an English surgeon.

== Biography ==
Shipton was the son of James Shipton, a druggist, living in Hatton Garden. He was apprenticed on 2 February 1696 for seven years to William Pleahill, paying 20l. He served his time and was duly admitted to the freedom of the Barber-Surgeons' Company on 7 March 1703. He served the office of steward of anatomy in 1704, and on 1 June 1731 he was fined rather than serve as steward of the ladies' feast. He was elected an examiner in the company on 27 August 1734, and on 17 August 1738 he became a member of its court of assistants. He then paid a fine of 30l. to avoid serving the offices of warden and master, to which he would have been elected in due course. He lived for many years in Brooke Street, Holborn, where he enjoyed a lucrative practice. He was called into consultation by John Ranby (1703–1773), when Caroline, the queen of George II, was mortally ill of a strangulated hernia. He sided in this consultation with Ranby against Busier, who was in favour of an immediate operation. Lord Hervey says of him that he was ‘one of the most eminent and able of the whole profession.’ He died on 17 September 1748.
