= Bellewe's Cases temp. Richard II =

14th century law reports

Ans du Roy Richard II., hors des les Abridgments de Statham, Fitzherbert et Brooke is the title of a collection of law reports, compiled by Richard Bellewe, of cases decided between approximately 1378 and 1400. For the purpose of citation their name may be abbreviated to "Bel". They are reprinted in volume 72 of the English Reports.

In 1847, J. G. Marvin said:

This volume of notes of cases is principally valuable from the fact of supplying, in part, a chasm in the Year Books, tem. Richard II. Bellewe collected all the cases and scattered notes to be found in print in the old reports and abridgments, which compilation forms a substitute for the Year Book of Richard II. The full reports of this reign are not in print, though Sir Matthew Hale says he had seen "the entire years and terms thereof in manuscript," out of which, or some other copy thereof, I suppose, Fitzherbert abstracted those broken cases of this reign in his abridgment. Hale's Hist. C. L. 175; 3 Reeves' Hist. Eng. L. 218; 2 Mere. & Steph. on Corp. 773.
