= Carrington and Payne's Reports =

Nominate reports by F A Carrington and J Payne

Reports of Cases at Nisi Prius, in the Queen's Bench, Common Pleas, and Exchequer, together with Cases tried in the Central Criminal Court, and on the Circuit, from Michaelmas Term, 1823, to Easter Term, 1841 is the title of a collection of nominate reports by F A Carrington and J Payne, of cases decided between approximately 1823 and 1841. They were published in nine royal octavo volumes from 1825 to 1841, by S Sweet.

They are also known as Carrington and Payne's Reports. For the purpose of citation, their name may be abbreviated to "C & P" or "Car & P".

Volume 1 of Carrington and Payne's Reports is reprinted in volume 171 of the English Reports. Volumes 2 to 6 of Carrington and Payne's Reports are reprinted in volume 172 of the English Reports. Volumes 7 to 9 of Carrington and Payne's Reports are reprinted in volume 173 of the English Reports.

In 1847, J G Marvin said:

In the Reports of Carrington and Payne, there are a considerable number of trivial and unimportant cases mixed up, we are willing to allow, with some others of a very different nature.

— 2 L. O. 35.

The Carrington and Payne's Reports reported the case of Joel v Morison.
