= Thomas Barnardiston =

Thomas Barnardiston may refer to:

- Sir Thomas Barnardiston (puritan) (1541–1619)
- Sir Thomas Barnardiston, 1st Baronet (died 1669), English politician
- Sir Thomas Barnardiston, 2nd Baronet (died 1698), English nobleman and politician
- Thomas Barnardiston (legal writer) (died 1752), English barrister and legal reporter
