= Ranby (surname) =

Ranby is a surname. Notable people with the surname include:

- John Ranby (1703–1773), English surgeon
- John Ranby (1743–1820), English pamphleteer
- Mark Ranby (born 1977), New Zealand rugby union player
- Sam Ranby (1897–1958), English footballer

== See also ==
- Randy
