= Bridgman's Legal Bibliography =

A Short View of Legal Bibliography
- Author: Richard W. Bridgman
- Language: English
- Publication date: 1807

A Short View of Legal Bibliography is a book by Richard W. Bridgman. It was first published in 1807.

In 1835, David Hoffman said this book was "wholly unworthy of the subject".

In 1847, John Gage Marvin said:

Mr. Bridgman's Treatise, though incomplete, is the best English work existing of the period embraced by his Legal Bibliography. The author's studies must have led him to a familiar acquaintance with the Reports, from which we might have expected a more enduring and satisfactory monument of research and criticism upon them, than this volume affords. This deficiency, so far as it regards the elder reporters, has recently been adequately supplied by the very judicious and able criticisms and notes of Mr. J. W. Wallace, in a work entitled, "The Reporters, chronologically arranged," &c.

In 1988, Bookman's Yearbook said that the fact that this book was still in use indicated "the sorry state" that legal bibliography was in, the book being "like a third class Lowndes or Brunet".

The Harvard Law Review said, in relation to Year-Book bibliography, that Brigdman's Legal Bibliography discloses little that is valuable and its accuracy does not stand the test of verification.
