= Barnardiston's Chancery Reports =

Reports of Cases in the High Court of Chancery, 13 and 14 Geo. II. from April 25, 1740, to May 9, 1741 is the title of a collection of nominate reports, by Thomas Barnardiston, of cases decided by the Court of Chancery, between approximately 1740 and 1741. For the purpose of citation, their name may be abbreviated to "Barn C". They are reprinted in volume 27 of the English Reports.

In 1847, J. G. Marvin said:

There has been a considerable diversity of opinion respecting the merits of the Reports. Lord Mansfield was at the bar when they were taken and knew the reporter very well, of whom and whose reports he always spoke disparagingly, and even forbid counsel to cite them in the argument of cases before him. Mr. Preston, in an argument before the Lord Chancellor remarked-"We come now, my lord, to the important case of Eliot v. Merryman, on which conveyancers have at all times relied as very material to the law affecting the case now before the court, which is in Barnardiston's Reports."

Lord Lyndhurst: "Barnardiston, Mr. Preston! I fear that is a book of no great authority; I recollect, in my younger days, it was said of Barnardiston, that he was accustomed to slumber over his note book, and the wags in the rear took the opportunity of scribbling nonsense in it." Mr. Preston; "There are some cases in Barnardiston, which, in my experience, and having had frequent occasion to compare that reporter's cases with the same cases elsewhere, I have found to be the only sensible and intelligent reports, and I trust I shall show your lordship that it may be said of Barnadiston, non omnibus dormio." Lord Manners, relying on a case in these reports, says: "Although Barnardiston is not considered a very correct reporter, yet some of his cases are very accurately reported." And Lord Elden, in reference to the same work, observed: "I take the great liberty of saying, that in that book there are reports of very great authority."

The doubts as to the accuracy of the reporter, have led, in several instances, to a comparison of the volumes with the register's book, which proves that Barnardiston, for the most part, has correctly reported the decisions of the Court. His reports have a peculiar value, from the fact of containing the decisions of the great Lord Hardwicke, and if the author has occasionally fallen into slight errors, they are neither so glaring or numerous as to detract much from their merits, or render them unworthy of a place in every lawyer's library. 2 Bur. 1142; 13 A. J. 483; 2 B. & B 386; 1 Bligh. N. S. 538; 1 East, 642; 8 D. & E. 48; 2 Bro. C. C. 36; 4 Ves. jun., 488, n.; 4 D. & E. 57; 1 Dow. & Cl. 11; Gres. Eq. Evid. 301, n.
