= Bendlowes =

Bendlowes is a surname. Notable people with the surname include:

- Edward Bendlowes (1603–1676), also rendered Edward Benlowes, English poet
- William Bendlowes (1516–1584), English sergeant-at-law, governor of Lincoln's Inn, Member of Parliament
