= General Andrews =

General Andrews may refer to:

- Avery D. Andrews (1864–1959), U.S. Army brigadier general
- Christopher Columbus Andrews (1829–1922), Union Army brigadier general and brevet major general
- Frank Maxwell Andrews (1884–1943), U.S. Army Air Forces lieutenant general
- George Andrews (adjutant general) (1850–1928), U.S. Army brigadier general
- George Leonard Andrews (1828–1899), Union Army brigadier general
- Lincoln Clark Andrews (1867–1950), U.S. Army brigadier general
- Timothy Andrews (general) (1794–1868), U.S. Army brevet brigadier general
