= Brook's New Cases =

Law reports compiled by Richard Bellewe

Ascuns novel cases de le ans et temps le Roy H. VIII., Edv. VI, and la Roygne Mary. Escrie ex la graund Abridgment, compose per Sir Robert Brooke, Chivaler, &c., la, disperse en les Titles; mes icy collect sub ans is the title of a collection of law reports, compiled by Richard Bellewe, of cases decided between approximately 1515 and 1558. They are reprinted in volume 73 of the English Reports.

J. G. Marvin said:

This is a collection of the most remarkable cases in the Common Pleas, from the 6th Hen. VIII., to the 4th Queen Mary. It has often been reprinted, and was translated into English by March. It is sometimes cited as Brooke's Cases.

He said of "Bellewe's Cases":

These cases were taken by Bellewe from Brooks's Abridgment [sic], and are sometimes referred to as Brooks's New Cases.

John Bouvier said:

Bellewe's Cases in the time of Henry VIII., Edw. VI., and 2 Mary, collected out of Brooke's Abridgment, and arranged under years, with a table, are cited as Brooke's New Cases.

For the purpose of citation, the name "Brook's New Cases" may be abbreviated to "B N C".

This collection is commonly known as "Petit Brooke" and "Petty Brook". It is also cited as "Bellewe's Cases temp. Henry VIII".
