= Solomon Sawrey =

English physician

- Born: 1765
- Died: 1825 (aged 59–60)
- Occupation: Physician

Solomon Sawrey (1765–1825) was an English physician.

== Biography ==
Sawrey was born in 1765, received his professional education from Andrew Marshal, M.D. (1742–1813), who taught anatomy privately in Bartlett's Court, Thavies' Inn, from 1785 to 1800. Sawrey attended Marshal's lectures in 1794, and attracted the attention of his master by a dissection of the nerves of the eye. He was admitted a member of the Corporation of Surgeons on 7 July 1796, and he acted for some years as demonstrator to Marshal. He lived first in Bucklersbury and afterwards in Chancery Lane. He practised his profession in both places, and in later life turned his attention more particularly to ophthalmic surgery. He died in 1825.

He wrote:

- ‘A popular View of the Effects of the Venereal Disease upon the Constitution,’ London, 8vo, 1794.
- ‘An Inquiry into some of the Effects of the Venereal Poison upon the Human Body,’ London, 8vo, 1802: the work is worthless, for the advance of knowledge has shown that its conclusions are based upon incorrect premisses.
- ‘An Account of a newly discovered Membrane in the Human Eye, to which are added some Objections to the Common Operation for Fistula Lacrymalis, and the Suggestion of a New Method of treating that Disease,’ London, 4to, 1807. The newly discovered membrane is now known as Descemet's membrane or the elder Demour's (1702–1795) membrane. The new method of treating fistula consisted in passing a probe through the nasal duct from below upwards, instead of from above downwards, as is usual. It never came into general use. He edited Marshal's ‘Morbid Anatomy of the Brain in Mania and Hydrophobia,’ with a memoir, London, 8vo, 1815.
