= Ranby =

Ranby may refer to:

- Ranby, Lincolnshire
- Ranby, Nottinghamshire
- Ranby (surname)
