= John Tracy Atkyns =

John Tracy Atkyns (died 1773) was an English barrister-at-law and compiler of the Atkyns' Reports.

== Biography ==
Atkyns was the third son of John Tracy, of Stanway, Gloucestershire, and great-grandson of the third Viscount Tracy, of Toddington. His mother was a daughter of Sir Robert Atkyns, lord chief baron, and it was probably on account of the legal eminence of his grandfather that he adopted the name of Atkyns. He entered Lincoln's Inn in 1724, and was called to the bar in 1732. He had matriculated at New College, Oxford in 1724.

In 1755 he was appointed cursitor baron of the exchequer. He had taken notes of the cases in the court of Chancery from Hilary term 1736 to Michaelmas term 1754, and he published condensed reports of them in three volumes (1765, 1667, 1668); a second edition appeared 1781/2, and a third, edited by Francis Williams Sanders, in 1794 (see Atkyns' Reports). In 1768 he made a codicil to his will under the name of Tracy. By his wife, whose name was Katherine Lindsay, he left no children. He died 25 July 1773. Lord Chief-Justice Wilmot describes him in his diary as "a cheerful, good-humoured, honest man, a good husband, master, and friend".
