= Andrew Marshal =

Scottish physician and anatomist

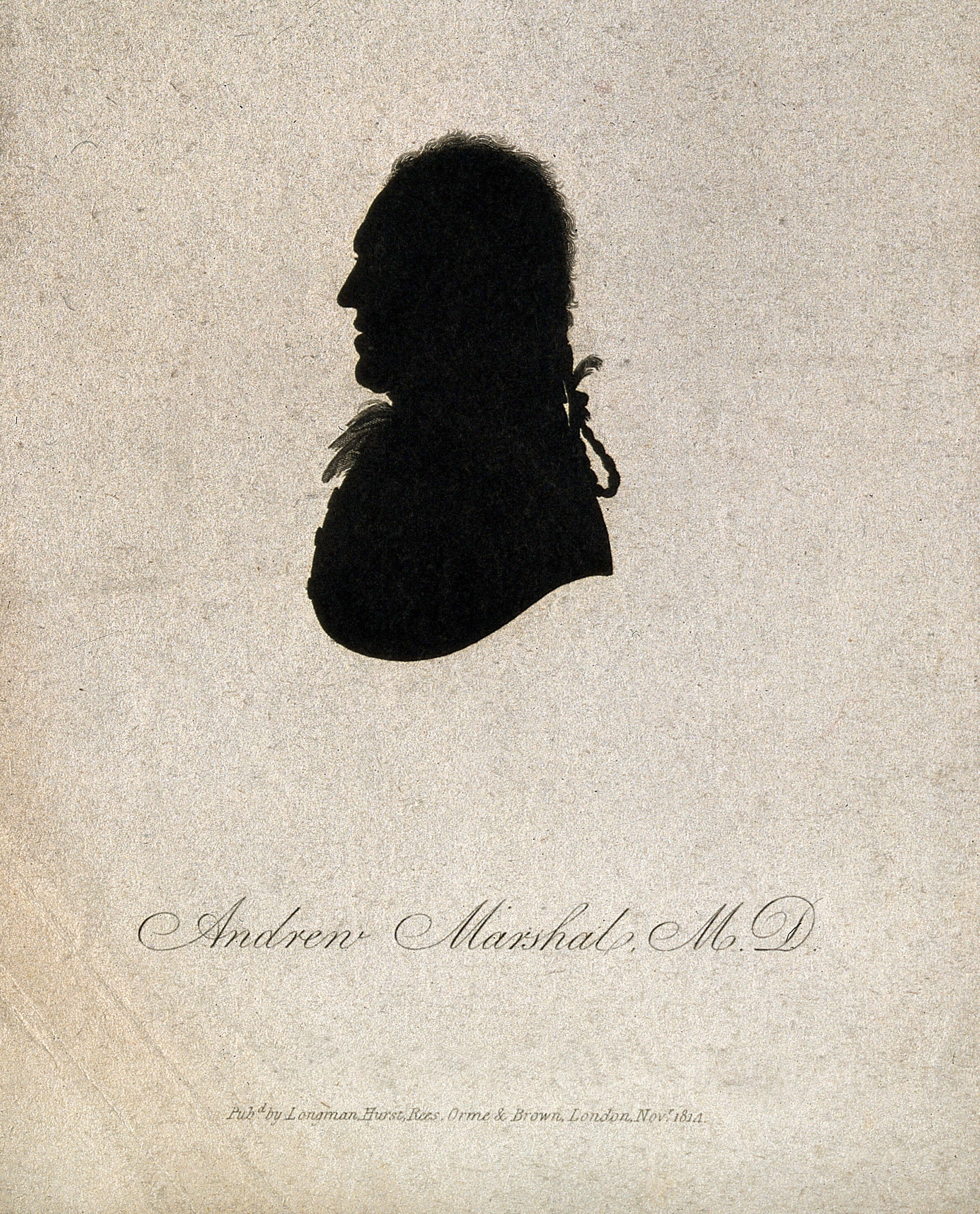
- Born: 1742; Fifeshire
- Died: 4 April 1813 (aged 70–71); Holborn
- Occupations: Physician and anatomist

Andrew Marshal (1742 – 4 April 1813) was a Scottish physician and anatomist.

== Biography ==
Marshal was born in 1742 near Newburgh in Fifeshire. He was son of a farmer. He was educated at Newburgh and Abernethy, and was at first intended for a farmer; but when he was about sixteen he decided to become a minister among the 'Seceders,' a body to which his father belonged, and which had separated from the established kirk in 1732. This plan he relinquished in consequence of his having given some trifling offence to his co-religionists, and for some time subsequently led a desultory life, without any definite and continuous employment. He was for four years tutor in a gentleman's family, carried on his studies both at Edinburgh and Glasgow while supporting himself by teaching private pupils, and travelled abroad for about a year with the eldest son of the Earl of Leven and Melville. He translated the first three books of Robert Simson's 'Conic Sections,' Edinburgh, 1775, and gave some attention to Greek, Latin, trigonometry, logic, metaphysics, and theology. At last, when thirty-five years old, he seriously adopted the medical profession, and in 1777 went to London to prosecute his studies, although he was invited to become a candidate for the professorship of logic and rhetoric at the university of St. Andrews. In London he attended the lectures of Cruikshank and the two Hunters in Great Windmill Street. In 1778 he was, through the interest of Lord Leven, appointed surgeon to the 83rd or Glasgow regiment, which he accompanied to Jersey. Here he remained till 1783, when the regiment was disbanded. He performed his duties with great zeal and ability, and with 'a rigid probity' that occasionally involved him in disputes with his commanding officers. In 1782 he graduated M.D. at Edinburgh, with an inaugural dissertation, 'De Militum Salute tuenda.' In the next year he settled in London, on the suggestion and under the auspices of Dr. David Pitcairn, who was at that time physician to St. Bartholomew's Hospital. He at first intended to practise surgery, and was admitted to the London College of Surgeons in January 1784; but he afterwards became a licentiate of the Royal College of Physicians (September 1788). For the first seventeen or eighteen years of his life in London he was known almost exclusively as a successful teacher of anatomy. His anatomical school was in Thavies Inn, Holborn, where he settled in 1785, and built a dissecting-room. It was at first intended that Marshal's lectures should form part of a scheme (suggested by Dr. Pitcairn) for establishing a kind of school of physic and surgery for the pupils of St. Bartholomew's Hospital; but this plan was, to his disappointment, given up, and he lectured on his own account. Both his figure and his voice were against him; but he was so thoroughly acquainted with his subject that the matter of his lectures was excellent, and 'the whole was given with a constant reference to the infinite wisdom of the contrivance exhibited in the structure, so as to form the finest system of natural theology.' In 1800 he gave up his lectures on account of his health, and devoted himself entirely to medical practice, which he had before neglected. He died, after much suffering, at Bartlett's Buildings, Holborn, 4 April 1813. He was unmarried. He was always of an unsocial temper, and in his later years was very much alone. He left behind him numerous papers and memorandum-books, which were entrusted to the care of Solomon Sawrey, who had been his assistant in preparing his lectures. He had also a valuable anatomical museum, of which a detailed catalogue raisonne was being prepared at the time of his death. The only papers that were found to be fit for publication were edited by Sawrey, London, 8vo, 1815, with the title, 'The Morbid Anatomy of the Brain, in Mania and Hydrophobia; with the Pathology of these two Diseases.' The book, which furnishes much valuable information, derived from accurate observation, contains four parts : I. 'That Water in the Pericardium and Ventricles of the Brain is an Effect and Evidence of Disease.' II. 'On Canine Madness.' III. ' Morbid Anatomy of the Brain in Mania,' IV. 'Observations on the Nature of Mania.'
