= William Henry Maule =

English lawyer, judge and politician (1788–1858)

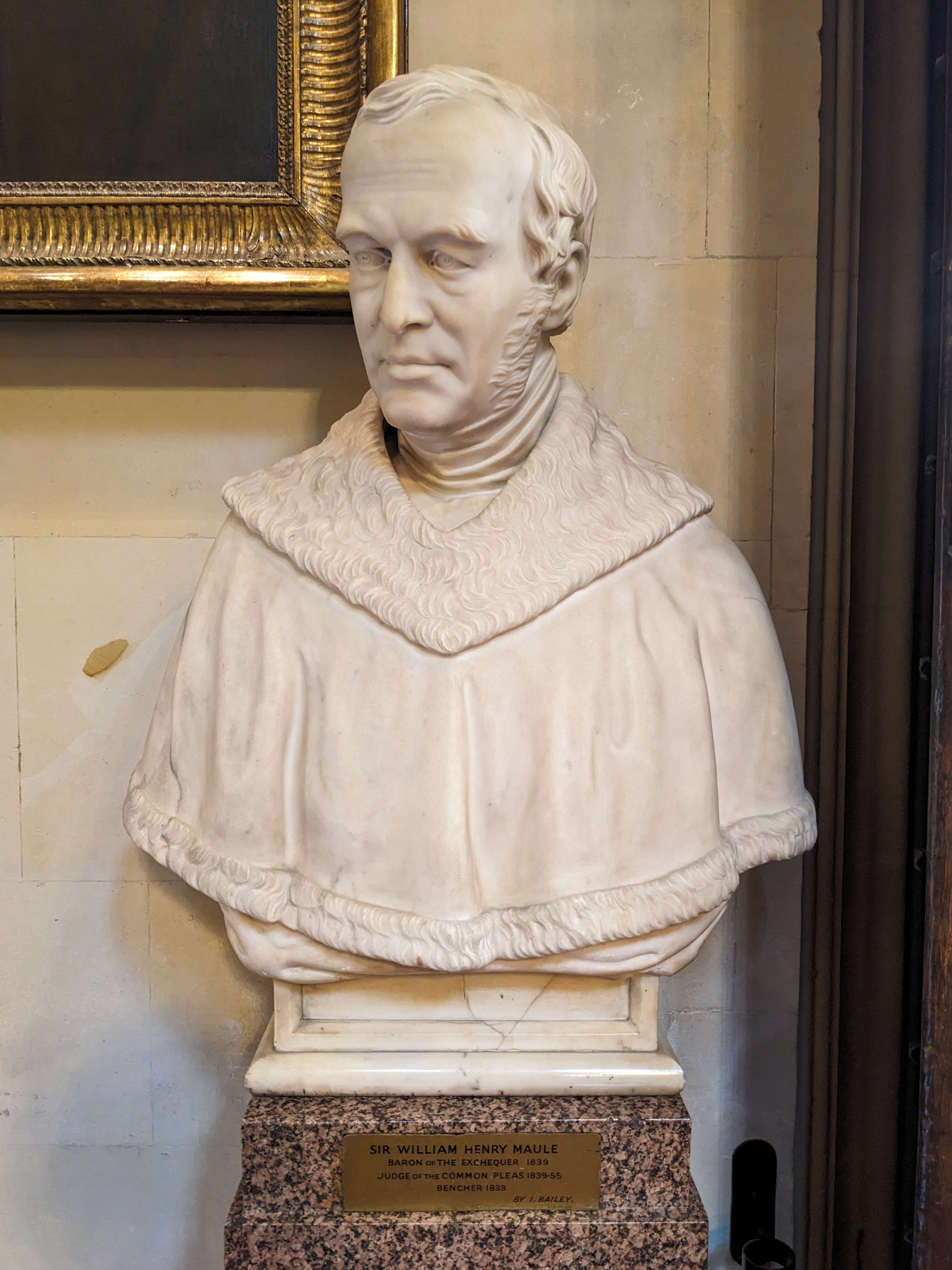
Bust of William Henry Maule at Lincoln's Inn

Sir William Henry Maule PC (25 April 1788 – 16 January 1858) was an English lawyer, Member of Parliament and judge.

== Life ==
Maule was born in Edmonton, Middlesex. His father, Henry, was a physician and his mother, Hannah née Rawson, a Quaker. He was educated at a private school and then at Trinity College, Cambridge, where he was senior wrangler and Smith's prize winner in 1810 and where he became a fellow in 1811.

He initially remained in Cambridge, where he was a close friend of Charles Babbage, and worked as a mathematics tutor, including Edward Ryan and Cresswell Cresswell among his students. He was offered the post of professor of mathematics at the East India College but, in 1810, Maule had already entered Lincoln's Inn with the intention of practising law. He was called to the bar in 1814 and began practice in commercial law, especially marine insurance, at 3 Essex Court. Maule was appointed King's Council in 1833 and in 1835 became counsel to the Bank of England, succeeding Sir James Scarlett.

His retention by the bank did not prevent him from acting for Nicholas Aylward Vigors who faced an election petition over his County Carlow by-election victory in February 1837. Maule's success established his reputation in the region and he himself was elected for Carlow in the 1837 United Kingdom general election of August.

Maule's ironic address in 1845 to a convicted bigamist was said to have contributed to the climate of opinion which led to the passage of the 1857 Divorce Act:

Prisoner at the bar, you have been convicted before me of what the law regards as a very grave and serious offence, that of going through the marriage ceremony a second time while your wife was still alive...

You plead in mitigation of your conduct that she was given to dissipation and drunkenness, that she proved herself a curse to your household while she remained mistress of it, and that she had latterly deserted you; but I am not permitted to recognise any such plea...

The law in its wisdom points out a means by which you might rid yourself from further association with a woman who had dishonoured you; but you did not think proper to adopt it. I will tell you what that process is. You ought first to have brought an action against your wife's seducer if you could discover him; that might have cost you money, and you say you are a poor working man, but that is not the fault of the law. You would then be obliged to prove by evidence your wife's criminalty in a court of justice, and thus obtain a verdict with damages against the defendant, who was not unlikely to turn out to be a pauper.

But so jealous is the law (which you ought to be aware is the perfection of reason) of the sanctity of the marriage tie, that in accomplishing all this you would only have fulfilled the lighter portion of your duty. You must then have gone, with your verdict in your hand, and petitioned the House of Lords for a divorce, it would cost you perhaps five or six hundred pounds, and you do not seem to be worth as many pence. But it is the boast of the law that it is impartial, and makes no difference between the rich and the poor. The wealthiest man in the kingdom would have had to pay no less than that sum for the same luxury; so that you would have no reason to complain. You would, of course, have to prove your case over again, and at the end of a year, or possibly two, you might obtain a decree which would enable you legally to do what you have thought proper to do without it.

You have thus wilfully rejected the boon the legislature offered you, and it is my duty to pass upon you such sentence as I think your offence deserves, and that sentence is, that you be imprisoned for one day; and inasmuch as the present assizes is three days old, the result is that you will be immediately discharged.

Maule was knighted and appointed a Baron of the Court of the Exchequer in 1839, transferring to the Court of Common Pleas later that year. He was a practical and knowledgeable judge with a fine judicial sense of humour (witness his pointed opinion in a case of wife selling, and his refusal to follow any case reported in Espinasse's Reports, on the ground that the author was "just another ass"). Maule was the only judge to dissent (in part) on the ruling in M'Naghten's Case, which laid down the legal definition of insanity.

Maule retired from the bench because of poor health in 1855 but was appointed to the Privy Council. Maule never married, sharing a house with his widowed sister, Emma Maria Leathley, and unmarried niece, Emma Leathley. He died at home in London and is buried in Kensal Green Cemetery.

== Bibliography ==
- Obituaries:
  - Law Magazine, new ser., 5 (1858), 1–34
  - Solicitors' Journal, 2 (1857–8), 236
  - Law Times (23 Jan 1858), 247–8

- FitzGerald, J. D. (2004) "Maule, Sir William Henry (1788–1858)", rev. Hugh Mooney, Oxford Dictionary of National Biography, Oxford University Press, accessed 17 August 2007 (subscription, Wikipedia Library access or UK public library membership required)
- Foss, E. (2006) [1848–64]. A Biographical Dictionary of the Judges of England: From the Conquest to the Present Time 1066-1870. ISBN 1428629599.
