= Moore's Indian Appeals =

Set of nominate reports by Edmund F. Moore

Moore's Indian Appeals is a 14-volume set of nominate reports by English barrister Edmund F. Moore, published in London from 1837 to 1872.

It was printed under the full title of Reports of Cases Heard and Determined by the Judicial Committee and the Lords of His Majesty's most Honourable Privy Council on Appeal from the Supreme and Sudder Dewanny Courts in the East Indies, but more usually referred to as Moore's Indian Appeals.

It is often abbreviated as M.I.A.

An example cited is as: Moofti Mohummud Ubdoollah v. Baboo Mootechund 1 M.I.A. 383.

The Moore's Indian Appeals carries reports published from the year 1836 to 1872 in 14 volumes. The set is supplemented by Law Reports Indian Appeals which carries judgements from the year 1873 to 1950 and published in 79 volumes.

It is available in some law school libraries as a reprint from 1927.
