= Richard Bellewe =

Richard Bellewe or Bellew (fl. 1575–1585) was a legal reporter of Irish ancestry and a member of Lincoln's Inn. He published the abridgment sometimes referred to as Brook's New Cases in 1578 and the abridgment sometimes referred to as Bellewe's Cases temp. Richard II in 1585.

He was admitted to the Society of Lincoln's Inn on 5 June 1575. There is no entry of his call to the bar by that society.
