= Richard W. Bridgman =

English attorney and legal writer (c.1761–1820)

Richard Whalley Bridgman (c.1761–1820) was an English attorney and writer on law.

== Life ==
Richard Whalley Bridgman was baptised on 9 March 1762, the son of Richard Bridgman and Sarah Whalley. He was an attorney and was employed as a clerk of the Grocers' Company in 1787. By June 1796 he had embezzled over £2,317, which he could not repay. He was declared a bankrupt and was subsequently imprisoned in Fleet jail before his release in 1804.

He was already a widower by 1797 and on 29 August 1797 he married Ann Lanty of Greenwich at St Martin in the fields. He died at Bath, Somerset 16 November 1820, in his fifty-ninth year. He was buried at St. Swithin, Walcot on 22 November 1820. The burial register states he lived in Walcot Parade (No.2), which survives as a Grade II listed building.

== Works ==
He left the following works, published between 1798 and 1813:

- Thesaurus Juridicus; containing the Decisions of the several Courts of Equity, &c., systematically digested from the Revolution to 1798, 2 vols. 1799–1800.
- Reflections on the Study of the Law, 1804.
- Dukes' Law of Charitable Uses, &c., 1805.
- An Analytical Digested Index of the Reported Cases in the several Courts of Equity, 1805, 2 vols.; 2nd edition, 1813, 3 vols.; 3rd edition, edited by his son, R. O. Bridgman, 1822, 3 vols.
- Supplement to the Analytical Digested Index, &c., 1807.
- A Short View of Legal Bibliography, to which is added a Plan for classifying a Public or Private Library, 1807.
- A Synthesis of the Law of Nisi Prius, 1809, 8vo.
- Judgment of the Common Pleas in Benyon against Evelyn, 1811.
- An annotated edition of Sir Francis Buller's Introduction to the Law relative to Trials at Nisi Prius, 1817.
