= Alexander Anstruther (judge) =

Scottish judge in India (1769-1819)

Sir Alexander Anstruther (10 September 1769 – 16 July 1819) was a Scottish judge in India during the East India Company administration of the Madras and Bombay Presidencies.

== Life ==
Anstruther was the second son of Sir Robert Anstruther, 3rd Baronet, of Balcaskie, Fife. He was called to the bar at Lincoln's Inn, and published 'Reports of Cases argued and determined in the Court of Exchequer, from Easter Term 32 George III to Trinity Term 37 George III, both inclusive,' which were published in three volumes in 1796 and 1797, and were reprinted for a second edition in 1817.

Anstruther went out to India in 1798, and was appointed Advocate-General of Madras in 1803. In March 1812 he succeeded Sir John Henry Newbolt as Recorder of Bombay, and was knighted. While on his voyage out to India he wrote a small work on Light, Heat, and Electricity.

Alexander married Sarah Prendergast, the widow of Captain William Selby of the Bombay Marine, on 14 March 1803 in Surat. They had nine children. Alexander died in Mauritius in July 1819, leaving Sarah with her seven surviving children. Sarah returned to Scotland and died at Airth Castle in 1865.
