= John Ranby (pamphleteer) =

English pamphleteer (1743–1820)

John Ranby (1743–1820) was an English pamphleteer, known for his anti-abolitionist writings. James Boswell interpolated in his Life of Johnson a reference to Ranby, his "learned and ingenious friend", as a pendant to Samuel Johnson's expressed wish for the abolition of slavery, stating that Johnson was poorly informed.

== Life ==
Born George Osborne, he was an illegitimate son of John Ranby the surgeon. He took the surname Ranby by royal licence, in 1756. He was brought up with his sister Hannah, born in 1740, in a house in Chiswick, with his father's friend William Hogarth as a neighbour. Their mother died in 1746. Hannah married the Member of Parliament Walter Waring in 1758.

Ranby was at school at Eton College, and then a student at Trinity College, Cambridge which he entered in 1761, as George Ranby. Not taking a degree, he entered Lincoln's Inn in 1762. He stated that he knew Richard Watson at Cambridge. In 1763 he was a supporter of John Wilkes.

As pamphleteer, Ranby developed into a partisan and loyalist writer in the Tory interest. In later life he resided first at Woodford in Essex, where he befriended Thomas Maurice the orientalist, and then at Bury St Edmunds, where he died on 31 March 1820. He was buried at Brent Eleigh in Suffolk, where there was a monument to him and his wife.

== Works ==
In 1791 Ranby published Doubts on the Abolition of the Slave Trade, which James Boswell commended. It was followed by Observations on the Evidence Given Before the Committees of the Privy Council and House of Commons in Support of the Bill for Abolishing the Slave Trade, also in 1791.

In 1794, during the early part of the French Revolutionary Wars, Ranby in his Short Hints on a French Invasion deprecated a general tendency to panic. He commented that the volunteer militia could be deployed against the reform society activists.

Three years later Ranby supported Bishop Richard Watson in his controversy with Gilbert Wakefield. In 1811 he attempted to undermine a Whig watchword in An Enquiry into the Supposed Increase of the Influence of the Crown. To do so, he quoted George Tierney against Henry Brougham, to good effect in suggesting Whigs were lukewarm reformers.

== Family ==
Ranby married Mary, daughter of Edward Goate and his wife Mary Barnardiston, who was sister of Thomas Barnardiston. She died on 3 January 1814.

== Notes ==
Bibliography

This article incorporates text from a publication now in the public domain: Lee, Sidney, ed. (1896). "Ranby, John". Dictionary of National Biography. Vol. 47. London: Smith, Elder & Co.
