= Sergio Cosimini =

Italian serial killer

- Born: 1963 (age 62–63); Florence, Province of Florence, Italy
- Other name: "The Madman of Florence"
- Convictions: Various, none for murder
- Penalty: Involuntary commitment (murder); Various (non-murder)

Details
- Victims: 3
- Span of crimes: 1989–1990
- Country: Italy
- States: Florence, Siena
- Date apprehended: 1 June 1990

Sergio Cosimini (born 1963), known as The Madman of Florence (Italian: Il Folle di Firenze), is an Italian serial killer who committed three murders in Tuscany between 1989 and 1990. Cosimini was later ruled to be unfit to stand trial and instead interned at a psychiatric facility.

== Early life ==
Sergio Cosimini was born in Florence in 1963 into an affluent family. His father Franco owned a furniture factory in Poggibonsi, while his mother came from a wealthy family background. The latter's death from leukemia deeply disturbed Sergio's psyche, and soon afterwards, he started showing signs of mental imbalance.

=== Worsening mental health ===
Out of "fear of being attacked", Cosimini obtained several knives and chains that he kept in his room, where he locked himself away for long periods of time. His father, who by then had remarried to a young woman from Siena, began sending Sergio to psychologists and psychiatrists for treatment, but the young man still developed a severe form of anxiety and depression.

In 1979, he committed his first robbery at an armory in Florence, stealing a gun, and began to have mystical visions claiming to see the Virgin Mary. Two years later, Cosimini enlisted in the Italian Armed Forces, but was discharged in 1983 after the Medical Officer concluded that he suffered from a schizoid personality disorder.

On 8 November 1988, Cosimini, carrying a sawed-off shotgun under his vest, was stopped on a moped. When asked why he had the weapon, he jokingly said, "I was going to do a robbery." Not long after, he began to abuse drugs and live on the streets.

== Murders ==
On 26 December 1989, a little over a year after the moped incident, Cosimini shot and killed 65-year-old Antonio Cordone, a retired soccer coach who was walking his dog in Florence. Cordone was killed with a single shot to the temple, with his killer leaving behind a letter filled with threats toward the former head of the Florence Mobile Squad, signed at the end with 666, the number of the beast. Later on, Cosimini claimed that he made two anonymous phone calls to the local police department in which he admitted to the murder, but despite efforts to identify the caller, authorities were unable to do so.

On 20 March 1990, Cosimini sexually abused two girls on the street and beat up a policeman who had arrive at the scene – he was sentenced to four months imprisonment for this crime, but was deemed "not dangerous" by the judge and thus did not serve a single day in jail. Not even two months later, on 1 June, Cosimini was riding a stolen moped on the wrong side of the road on Via dei Gazzani in Siena. Two carabinieri, 28-year-old Mario Forziero and 24-year-old Nicola Campanile, drove up to the man to question him, but the moment Cosimini saw them, he pulled out a revolver and shot them three times.

Forziero died on the spot as he bent over the steering wheel, while Campanile managed to get out of the vehicle and fire six shots before slumping to the ground. Cosimini then attempted to get away by blending in with a crowd of tourists, but was arrested. He was then taken to the nearby police station, where he confessed not only to killing the two carabinieri, but also Cordone, claiming that the man "looked at [him] wrong." He then stated that the same applied to Forziero and Campanile, adding that he "finished the job when he [got] out."

== Arrest and internment ==
During Cosimini's trial, he was declared mentally unfit and almost immediately interned at a psychiatric hospital in Montelupo Fiorentino. In this regard, his father Franco (who died in 2011) pleaded that his son never be released, leaving him out of his will.

In 1998, Cosimini was allowed to go on a short walk out of the facility in the company of two volunteers. While being walked around the Boboli Gardens, he managed to escape from the two volunteers after they went into a nearby bar to buy him something to drink. Cosimini remained a fugitive for two days before being caught in Fiesole, offering no resistance and requesting that he be taken back to prison. At the time of his arrest, Cosimini said that he had just wanted to be free for a little bit, as the hospital staff supposedly gave him too much medicine and that he was hearing voices telling him to commit suicide. Cosimini was later moved to other facilities, including one in Castiglione delle Stiviere.

On 6 January 2016, following acts of self-injury to his toes, Cosimini was admitted to the San Giuseppe Hospital in Empoli. On 2 February, following the closure of the psychiatric hospital in Montelupo Fiorentino, he was then transferred to a health-care facility in Volterra. This decision was strongly criticized by Marco Cordone, the son of Antonio Cordone and founder of the "Dalla parte di Abele" committee, a victims' rights organization advocating for effective punishments for violent offenders. In a statement concerning the decision, Mario Cordone stated that he was against the closure of the psychiatric hospitals and argued that Cosimini's transfer was shameful, as the facility had no armed security.

== See also ==
- List of serial killers by country
