= George Henry Andrews =

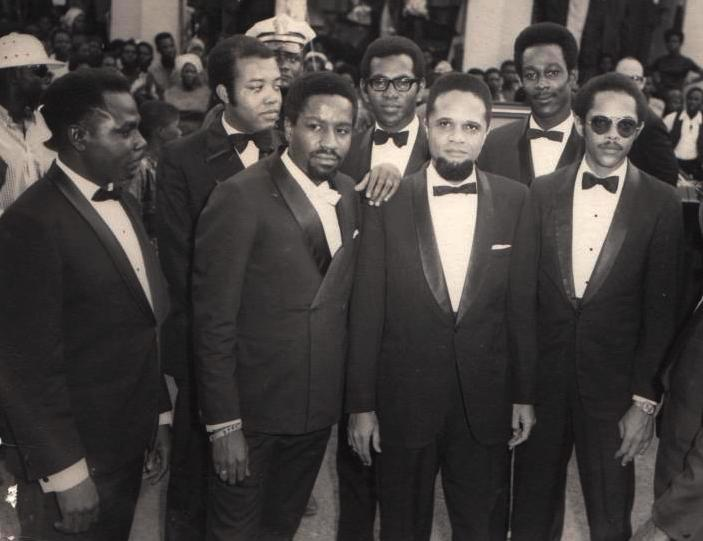
George Andrews (second from right) as Best Man at the 1965 wedding of his best friend

George Henry Andrews (1926 – September 3, 1997) was a Liberian sports journalist and later minister of Tourism and Cultural Affairs of Liberia. He presided over a pivotal election in the 1990s.

== Life ==
Andrews was born in Cape Palmas, Liberia in 1926. His father, Lawrence Andrews, had impregnated a native girl and felt too ashamed to admit being the father of the child. Lawrence condemned the girl as a liar and left the area. He would not see his son again for nearly 40 years. Andrews grew up in abject poverty, but as a descendant of Americo-Liberian, being fair skinned through the blood of his father, he managed to use the perceived social status to get a scholarship to high school.

Andrews excelled in school. Perhaps because he felt the need to nullify his father's complete rejection, he pushed himself and was valedictorian of every academic class he ever entered. His mother died in 1941 and he later said he was ashamed because part of him had always been embarrassed by the fact that his mother was an uneducated member of the ethnic and social underclass. In 1945 Andrews entered journalism school and graduated to become Liberia's most popular sports announcer. His play-by-play was so popular that there are still Liberians today who talk admiringly about his quips and speaking style.

By 1949, Andrews was tired of sports casting. He felt that Liberia did not present enough opportunities for an ambitious young man, so he applied to attend university in the US and was accepted to the University of Cincinnati, Ohio where he studied journalism. In the United States he excelled at school but was a bit of a playboy. By the end of his studies in 1954, he had gotten a son by a young African-American fellow student. Despite vowing to never do what his father had done, George denied being the father of the child and left the U.S. so that the mother could not force him to support the child.

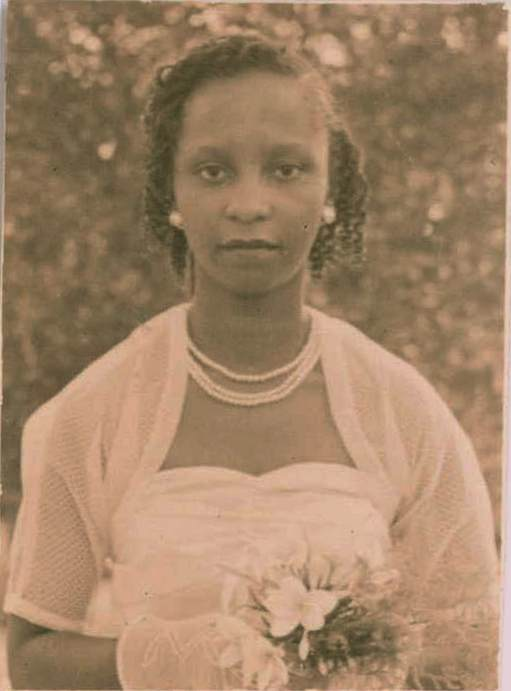
Esther Urey in formal dress at 1958

Back in Liberia, Andrews started an advertising business with the money he had saved while working in America. The business soon died from lack of prospects in the small backward African country, but through it he met R.D. Urey, the father of the woman who would later become his wife. Urey was a man of small stature but great power. He was mayor of what was at the time Liberia's second city, Careysburg. He also owned huge tracts of rubber trees leased out to the Firestone Rubber Company. The young George impressed the older Urey with his desire for learning and his drive. Soon, Andrews, with Urey, was attending meetings of Liberia's one and only political party, the True Whigs.

Andrews was an excellent speaker, having been trained as a radio announcer, and impressed the big boys of the party. He was hired in 1958 as news anchor for the then fledgling government TV station. His style and the exposure of TV brought young Andrews fame. He married Esther Urey, the 4th of R.D. Ureys seven daughters in 1960. Some say the bride was already pregnant at the wedding, but Andrews always insisted that the child was born two months premature. Now married and respectable in Liberia's conservative society, George moved up the ranks at the Ministry of Information. On the election of William R. Tolbert in 1973, Andrews was appointed to the cabinet of the president as Minister of Information, Cultural Affairs, and Tourism. He now had eight children, not all of them by his wife. His infidelity brought a souring of relations between him and his wife's powerful family. But his wife loved him and protected him after Urey had decided the brash playboy should be brought down a notch.

Andrews was now a powerful man in his own right. He built a three-story mansion in a fashionable part of Monrovia, the capital city, and moved in with his wife and all eight of his children. This was the beginning of the talk that George might be presidential material. Andrews himself made no bones that he was capable of holding any position in the government.

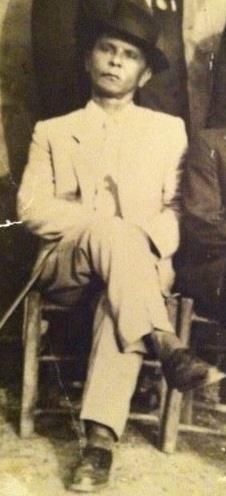
R.D. Urey in 1947.

== The turning point ==
In 1976, at the prompting of his wife, Andrews contacted his father who was now an American citizen living in Pennsylvania, U.S.A. That episode made him desire to find his roots, so he made sort of a pilgrimage to his birthplace in Liberia, Cape Palmas. The experience left him changed forever.

He saw people who had not progressed in all the time he had been gone. They lived in constant and backbreaking poverty. He would later tell his wife that all his sins came back to him then, especially how he had treated the American mother of his first child. As minister of Tourism and Cultural Affairs he was able to help his hometown, and was soon diverting government projects and aid their way. He apologized to the mother of his first child, and sent for his son in the U.S. to come and live with him in Liberia. Andrews was now preoccupied with the poverty of his hometown. He wrote in a letter to his father,

It's like I have only just awakened and am seeing all this poverty and suffering for the first time. I cannot believe people live like this, or that others allow them to.

He felt uncomfortable with his part and place in the cabinet of a political system he now thought of as evil. But with 8 children and a wife, he was torn between following his new ideals and the reality of having to support his family. In January 1980, Andrews gave an interview to Johnathan Raffle, a young man he had recruited into the ministry's broadcasting wing. The young man, knowing of Andrews' new thinking on the situation in the country, asked him point blank what he felt about the fact that the economy of the country was controlled by Lebanese traders who had settled in Liberia after fleeing war in Lebanon. It was common knowledge in the country that the Lebanese community paid off the President to keep their favored position.

Andrews felt that he could not dodge the question. He expounded a startlingly frank diatribe against the evils of a government that oppressed its own people and kept foreign parasites protected so that they could continue to "suck the blood of the people." The interview caused a sensation in the country. For the Lebanese community and the ruling class, he was a Judas, a turncoat seeking personal fame and power. To the indigenous masses, he was an instant hero, the rare man in Africa who is willing to speak the truth in public.

The president, under pressure from the Lebanese, demanded a retraction and apology from his Information Minister. Andrews refused, and in a second interview, said that "it would be as evil to apologize for truth, as it would be to lie." President Tolbert was incensed, and fired him the next day. He was blacklisted in the tiny nation and had to leave the country to find employment. In June 1980 his entire family moved to neighboring Côte d'Ivoire where he took a job as head of the secretariat for the African Development Bank. Writing to his son at this time, Andrews said what hurt him most was that through it all, not one of the friends in the cabinet he had known since his teenage years stood up to back him or support him.

Less than 7 months later, the Liberian president was dead, tortured and assassinated in his own bedroom, and the 13 ministers of his cabinet lined up and shot by a group of military men led by Samuel K. Doe, a master sergeant in the Liberian Army. A delegation from the coup leaders who had taken control of the government went to Côte d'Ivoire to offer the former minister the position as Liberian Ambassador to the United States, but Andrews declined, not wanting to work with people he believed were as oppressive as the ones they removed.

The country slowly degenerated into civil war. Prince Johnson's warring faction, the NPFL, captured Doe at the Monrovia Freeport and executed Doe in Caldwell in Monrovia. The fighting forces signed a peace deal in 1992. With that, Andrews returned home to find that his stature as an honest speaker of truth had grown. When the country decided to hold elections, it was near unanimous that he was the only person viewed by the people as having both the intelligence and the integrity to run the elections. Most historians attribute Liberia's peaceful transition into democracy to his leadership.

Andrews died on September 3, 1997, of a heart attack right after returning excess money to the Nigerian government which had partly financed the Liberian election. His decision to return the money was not viewed favorably by many in positions of power and rumors persist today that his death was not natural. Andrews will be remembered as a man who rose above his faults to become a champion of his people. He was buried at Palm Grove Cemetery in Monrovia.
