= William Bendlowes =

Member of the Parliament of England

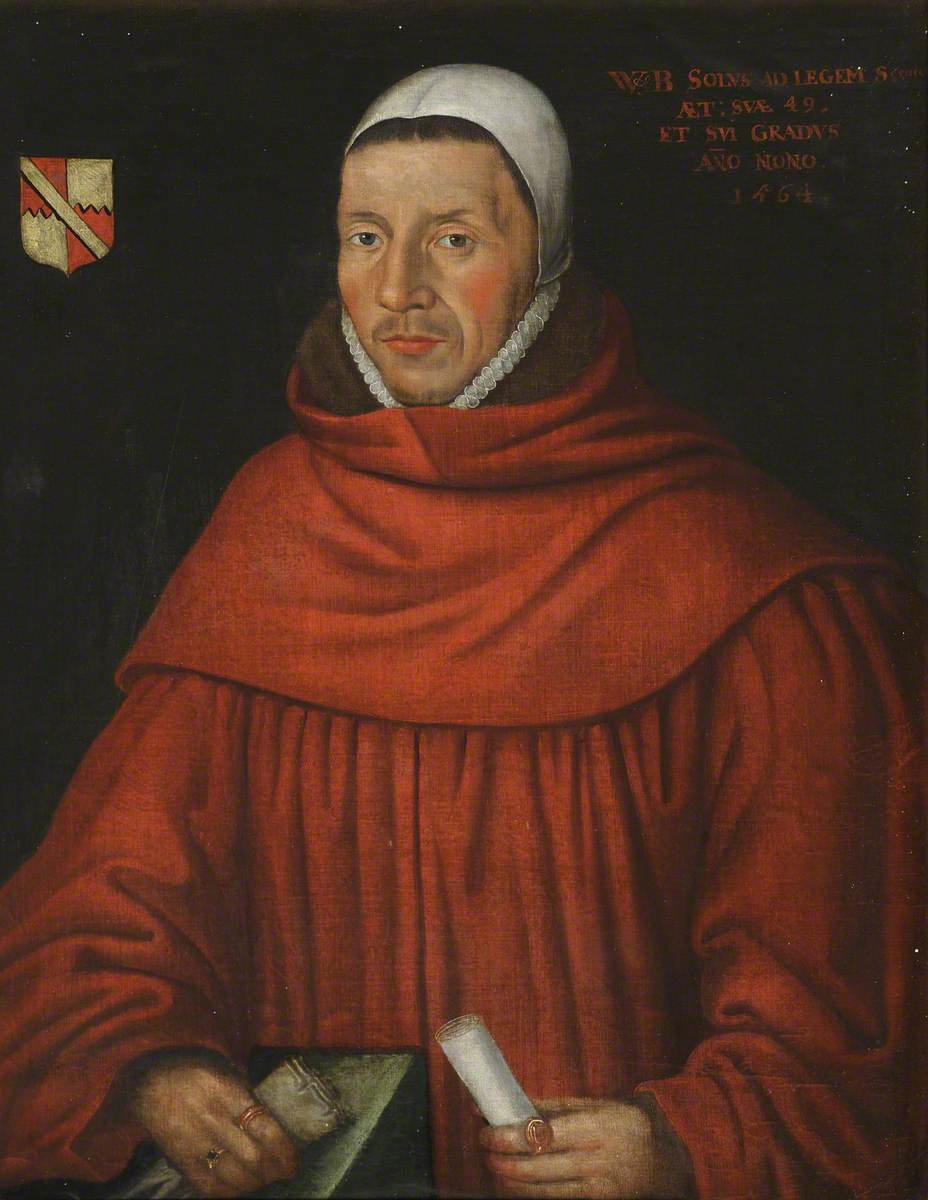
Image of William Bendlowes

William Bendlowes (1516–1584) (also Benloe, Benlow, Benlowe) was an English serjeant-at-law and legal writer. He was a Member of the Parliament of England for Helston October 1553, West Looe April 1554, and Dunheved November 1554.

== Life ==
He was the son of Christopher Bendlowes of Great Bardfield, in Essex, and his wife Elizabeth, daughter of John Ufford. He was educated for a time at St. John's College, Cambridge; but leaving the university without a degree, he became a member of Lincoln's Inn, and was called to the bar. In 1548 he was autumn reader of his inn, but did not lecture on account of the pestilence. He was again autumn reader in 1549.

He successively represented the Cornish boroughs of Helston, Penrhyn, and Dunheved in the Parliaments which met in the years 1553 to 1554. In 1555 he was double autumn reader at Lincoln's Inn, and was soon afterwards called to the degree of serjeant-at-law, he and the other serjeants included in the same call making their feast in the Inner Temple Hall on 16 October 1555. In the following year he was in a commission for the suppression of Lollards and heretics in Essex. His patrimony in that county was not inconsiderable, and he appears to have greatly increased it.

During the latter part of Queen Mary's reign, and the earlier part of Elizabeth's, Bendlowes was the only practising serjeant. He is said to have always adhered steadily to the Roman Catholic faith. In 1576 he became one of the governors of Lincoln's Inn, and he served the office in several succeeding years. The recorder Fleetwood, in a letter to Lord Burghley, relates that on the occasion of the investiture of Sir Edmund Anderson as Chief Justice of the Common Pleas, in May 1582, the Lord Chancellor (Hatton) "made a short discourse, what the dewtie and office of a good justice was"; and that after the Chief Justice was sworn, "Father Benloos, because he was auncient, did put a short case, and then myself put the next".

Bendlowes died on 19 November 1584 and was buried at Great Bardfield. In the combination room of St. John's College, Cambridge, there is a half-length portrait of Serjeant Bendlowes, "solus ad legem serviens, aet. suae 49, et sui gradus an. anno, 1564".

== Works ==
He is the author of "Le Reports de Gulielme Benloe Serjeant del Ley, des divers pleadings et cases en le Court del Comon-bank, en le several Roignes de le tres hault & excellent Princes, le Roy Henry VII, Henry VIII, Edw. VI et le roignes Mary & Elizabeth", London, 1689, folio. There is preserved in the Harleian collection of manuscripts, number 355, a paper book in folio, wherein are contained the reports of Serjeant Bendlowes, with indexes prefixed. Some reports by him were published at the end of Thomas Ashe's "Table's to the Year-books", etc., London, 1609, 12mo, and were reprinted with Robert Keilways "Reports", London, 1688, folio. Other reports by him appeared with certain cases in the times of James I and Charles I, London, 1661, folio. This latter work is cited as "New Bendlowes".

== Family ==
By his wife Eleanor, daughter of Sir Edward Palmer, of Angmering, Sussex, and widow of John Berners, he had a son, also named William Bendlowes, who appears to have been also a bencher of Lincoln's Inn and to have died in 1613.
