= Pierre Demours =

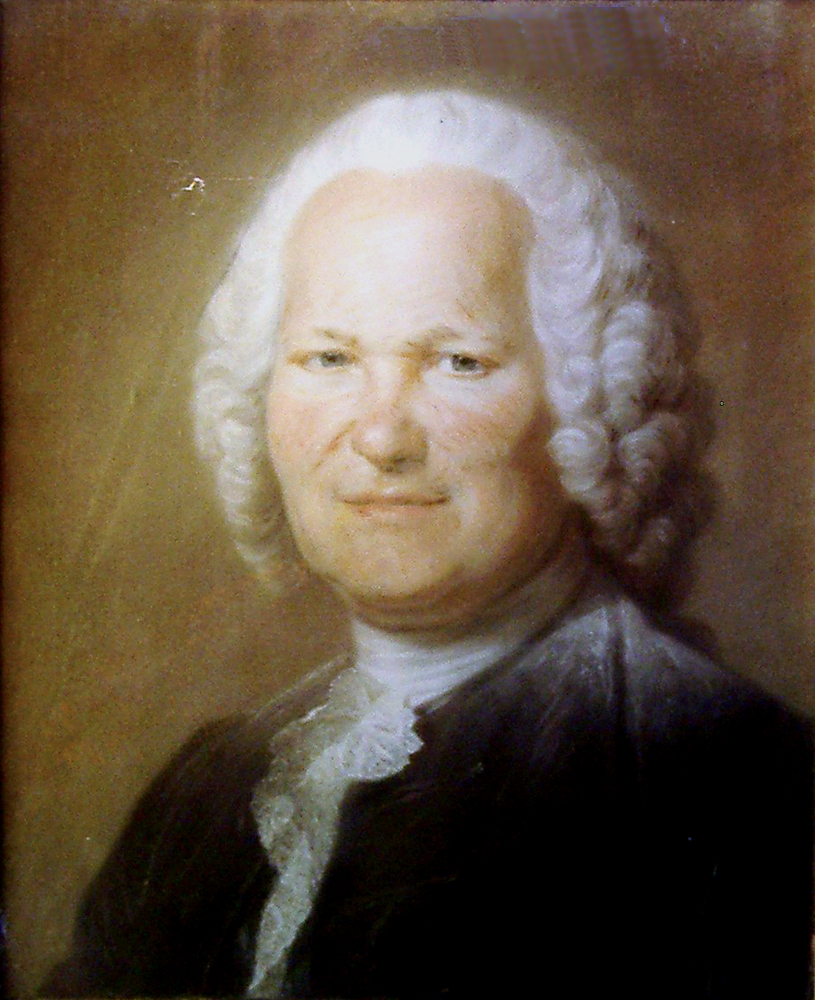
Pierre Demours, pastel by Quentin de la Tour

Pierre Demours (1702 – June 26, 1795) was a French physician, zoologist and translator.

== Biography ==
Demours was born in Marseille; his father was a pharmacist. He is not to be confused with his son, Antoine-Pierre Demours (1762–1836), also a renowned eye specialist and author.

He studied medicine in Avignon then Paris. He became a doctor in Avignon then went back to Paris for further study. Duverney chose him as his assistant. At Duverney's death (1730) Pierre Chirac chose Demours to succeed him as a demonstrator at the Jardin du Roy. He lost that position at Chirac's death two years later. He then thought of returning to Avignon but Antoine Petit made him his collaborator.

Upon advice from Petit he specialized in the anatomy and diseases of the eye and became a successful oculist. He described the membrane that is situated between the corneal "proper substance" and the endothelial layer of the cornea. He had a priority dispute over this with Jean Descemet (1732–1810). The structure which is now generally known as the membrane of Descemet is nevertheless still sometimes referred to as the membrane of Demours or Tunica Demoursii.

His description of the reproduction of the common midwife toad (Alytes obstetricans) was met with disbelief and only received credit when reactivated by Arthur de l'Isle du Dréneuf in 1872.

Demours was a very active translator from English to French. His translations included medical essays of the Philosophical Society of Edinburgh and a few volumes of the Transactions of the Royal Society. Stephen Hales' book about ventilation, which is credited for a spectacular decrease in mortality in prisons and ships, was also made available in French by Demours.

He died in Paris in 1795.

== Selected works ==
=== As an author ===
- Observations concernant l'histoire naturelle, et les maladies des yeux (1740)
- "Observations sur le crapaud mâle accoucheur de la femelle". Histoire de l'Académie royale des sciences (1741), hist. 28. The reproduction of the common midwife toad.
- Sur la structure cellulaire du corps vitré (1741)
- Observations sur la cornée (1741)

=== As an editor ===
- Table générale des matières contenues dans l'histoire et les mémoires de l'Académie royale des sciences (1747). Numerous volumes.

=== As a translator ===
- Essais et observations de medecine de la Société d'Edinbourg: ouvrage traduit de l'Anglois, & augmenté par le traducteur d'observations concernant l'histoire naturelle, & les maladies des yeux (1740–1747) OCLC 1909981
- E. Hales. Description du ventilateur … (1744) doi:10.3931/e-rara-14066
- Henry Baker. Essai sur l'histoire naturelle du polype, insecte (1744)
- John Ranby. Méthode de traiter les plaies d'armes à feu par M. J. Ranby, premier chirurgien du Roy d'Angleterre… (1745)
- Transactions philosophiques de la Société Royale de Londres. Années 1737 à 1746 (1759–1761)
