= George Andrews (barrister) =

George Andrews (fl. 1776), of the Middle Temple, was a British barrister-at-law.

Andrews was the son of George Andrews of Wells, and he was admitted to Middle Temple on 2 July 1728, and subsequently called to the English Bar on 20 June 1740.

Andrews published reports of cases argued in the court of King's Bench during the eleventh, twelfth, and thirteenth years of the reign of George II of Great Britain (1737–1740) before Sir William Lee, chief justice, and Sir Francis Page, Sir Edmund Probyn, and Sir William Chapple. He was the only son of George Andrews, of Wells; he was called to the bar in 1740.

Andrews's 'Reports' are seldom now referred to, but they had a high reputation in the last century. A folio edition was published in 1754, and an octavo edition, with some additional cases, in 1792 by G. W. Vernon of the Irish bar. They are pronounced by Marvin (Legal Bibliography, sub tit. ‘Andrews’) to be ‘accurate, judicious, and satisfactory,’ and are characterised by Rayner (Readings on the Statutes, p. 96, published 1775) as ‘very much esteemed by the profession in general.’
