= Edmund Anderson (judge) =

Chief Justice of the Common Pleas (1530–1605)

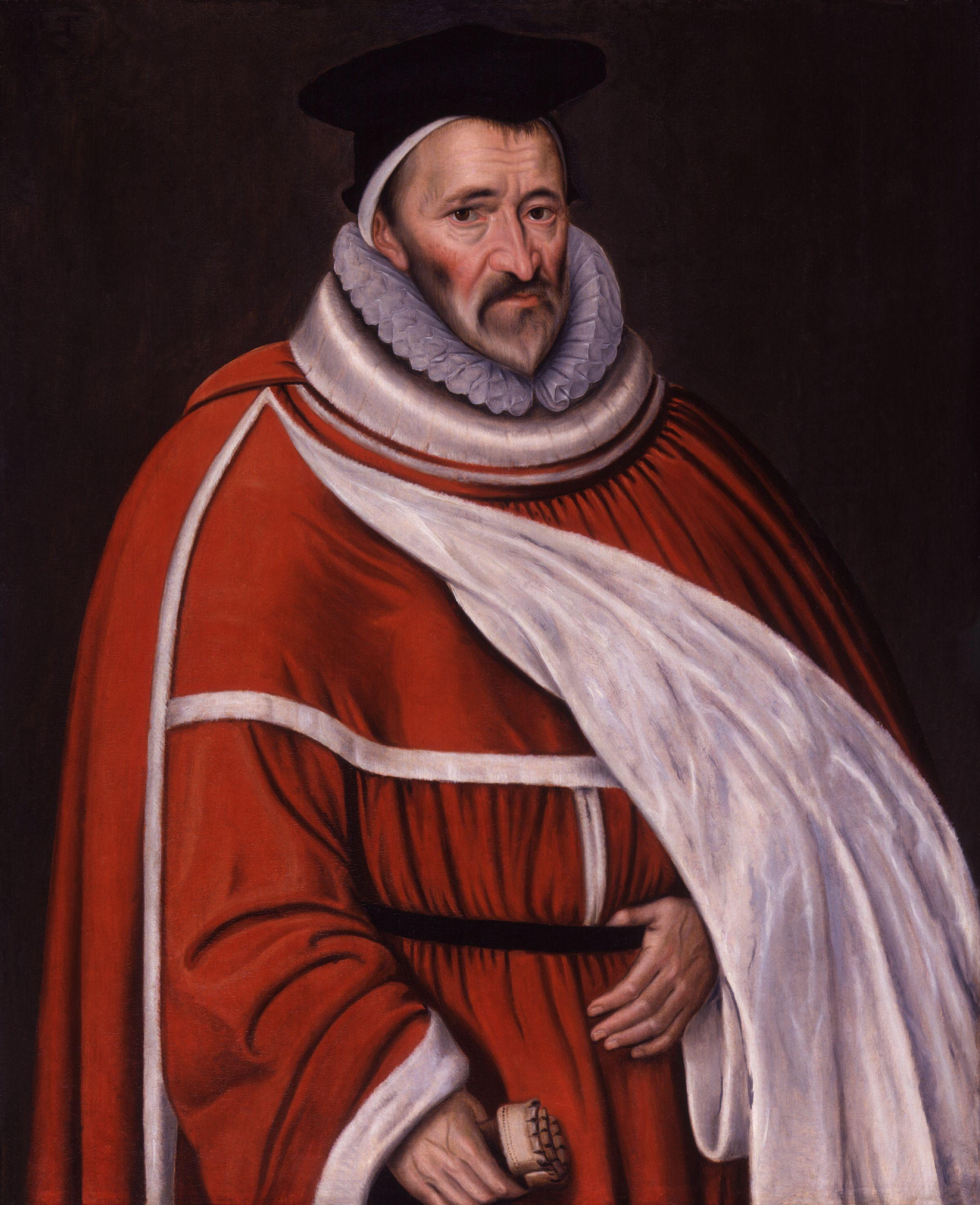
Sir Edmund Anderson

Sir Edmund Anderson (1530 – 1 August 1605), Chief Justice of the Common Pleas under Elizabeth I, sat as judge at the trial of Mary, Queen of Scots.

== Life ==
The Anderson family originated in Scotland and then came to Northumberland. They settled in Lincolnshire in the 14th century and became a prominent family there.

Sir Edmund Anderson, son of Edward Anderson, was born in Flixborough in Lincolnshire c. 1530. He received the first part of his education in the country and then spent a brief period at Lincoln College, Oxford, before entering the Inner Temple in June 1550. He is recorded to have matriculated at St John's College, Cambridge, in 1549.

In 1577, Anderson was created Serjeant-at-Law and in 1578 he was appointed Queen's Sergeant. In 1581 he was appointed Justice of Assize on the Norfolk circuit and tried Edmund Campion and others for high treason in November 1581, securing an unexpected conviction. This set the pattern for the rest of his career: as a judge, he was notorious for severity to Catholics and non-conformists, markedly so in the cases of John Perrot and John Udall, the puritan minister.

On the back of that success, Anderson was made Chief Justice of the Common Pleas in 1582 and was knighted. He was reappointed by James I and held office until his death. Throughout his career he played a prominent role in some of the most important political trials of Elizabeth's reign including that of Mary, Queen of Scots, and Sir Walter Raleigh. Sir Edmund also presided over the trial of William Davison, the Queen's secretary who was accused of erroneously issuing the warrant for the execution of Mary, Queen of Scots.

In 1588 he was sent to Ireland, where he headed a judicial commission to deal with the flood of litigation which followed the forfeiture of the lands of the Earl of Desmond. Its findings were something of a foregone conclusion, since the judges had instructions to find in favour of the English Crown in all disputed cases, and duly did so. This however was untypical, as in civil cases he usually went to great lengths to be impartial.

Anderson died on 1 August 1605 at Eyeworth in Bedfordshire.

== Assessments ==
Anderson was often described as a strict lawyer who was "completely governed by the law". He even stated at an important trial that, "I sit here to judge of law, not logic". Yet he also had a reputation for deciding cases according to reason, without overreliance on the precedents. He was highly praised for his efficient dispatch of business: it was said that he wrote more orders in a morning then most of his predecessors had in a week.

In Sir Edward Coke and the Elizabeth Age by Allen D. Boyer, Sir Edmund is described as "the monster: an angry man in the courtroom and a resentful man afterward, an advocate who begrudged other lawyers' victories". On the other hand, Francis Bacon praised him as a great judge.

== Works ==
Anderson wrote two books, Reports of Many Principal Cases Argued and Adjudged in the Time of Queen Elizabeth, in the Common Bench 1644 and Resolutions and Judgments on the Cases and Matters Agitated in All the Courts of Westminster, in the latter end of the reign of Queen Elizabeth 1653, which are still today very influential legal references.

== Family ==
Anderson married Magdalen Smyth from Annables, Hertfordshire, daughter of Christopher Smyth and Margaret Hyde. They had 9 children, 3 sons and 6 daughters. Anderson became lord of the parish of Eyeworth, Bedfordshire, and his family remained the local gentry for many generations. He also bought Arbury Priory, which he demolished and replaced with Arbury Hall.

== Sources ==
Legal offices
Preceded by Sir James Dyer	Chief Justice of the Common Pleas; 1582–1605	Succeeded by Sir Francis Gawdy
