= George Grey Andrews =

Yacht designer, builder and racer, engineer, naval officer (1880–1952)

George Grey Andrews (17 May 1880 – 19 January 1952) was a New Zealand yacht designer, builder and racer, engineer, naval officer. He was born in Christchurch, North Canterbury, New Zealand on 17 May 1880.
