= George Lippitt Andrews =

- Born: April 22, 1828; Providence, Rhode Island
- Died: July 19, 1920 (aged 92); Washington, D.C.
- Spouse(s): Alice Beverly Potter; Emily Kemble Brown
- Military career
- Branch: United States Army
- Service years: 1861-1892
- Rank: Brigadier general

George Lippitt Andrews (April 22, 1828 – July 19, 1920) was an officer of the United States Army, who commanded the African-American 25th Infantry Regiment for 20 years.

== Early life and education ==
Andrews was born in Providence, Rhode Island, on April 22, 1828. He was educated in the grammar schools of Providence.

== Personal life ==
He was first married to Alice Beverly Potter. He was married a second time to Emily Kemble (Oliver) Brown on May 13, 1874. His son was George Andrews who became Adjutant General of the United States Army with the rank of brigadier general.

== Career ==
Andrews started a career in business in Providence in 1841, and moved to St. Louis, Missouri, in 1858.

Andrews was appointed lieutenant colonel of the 1st Missouri Infantry at the start of the American Civil War in 1861. While with this regiment, he was picked by his commander, Union Brigadier General, U.S. Volunteers, Nathaniel Lyon, to lead the 3rd Brigade which fought at the Battle of Wilson's Creek in Missouri on August 10, 1861.

He was mustered out of volunteer service in September 1861 and was commissioned in the Regular Army as the major of the 17th Infantry to rank from May 14 of the same year.

In June 1863, he was in command of Fort Preble in South Portland, Maine, during an action called the Battle of Portland Harbor.

He was promoted to lieutenant colonel on October 14, 1864, and was assigned to the 13th Infantry.

He was reassigned as lieutenant colonel of the 25th Infantry on December 15, 1870. On January 1, 1871, he was promoted to colonel and assigned as commander of the 25th Infantry. He commanded the 25th Infantry for 21 years until he retired from the Army in 1892.

He was a Veteran Companion of the District of Columbia Commandery of the Military Order of the Loyal Legion of the United States and a Compatriot of the Rhode Island Society of the Sons of the American Revolution.

In 1904, in recognition of his long and distinguished career, he was promoted to the rank of brigadier general on the retired list.

After retiring from the Army, General Andrews made his home in Washington, D. C. He died at his home there on July 19, 1920. He is buried in Arlington National Cemetery.
