= Thomas Barnardiston (legal writer) =

- Died: 14 October 1752
- Resting place: Chelsea, London
- Occupations: Barrister, legal reporter
- Known for: Barnardiston's Chancery Reports; Barnardiston's King's Bench Reports

Thomas Barnardiston (died 1752) was an English barrister and legal reporter, infamous for the inaccuracy of his law reports.

== Life ==
Barnardiston the eldest child of Thomas Barnardiston (born 1677), of Wyverstone and Bury St Edmunds, and his wife Mary, daughter of Sir George Downing, 1st Baronet., who married on 28 June 1705. His sister Elizabeth married John Ewer, and his sister Mary married Edward Goate. After Bury school, he was admitted to Clare College, Cambridge in 1722, and to the Middle Temple in 1723.

Barnardiston was created a serjeant-at-law on 3 June 1735. He died on 14 October 1752, and was buried on the 20th at Chelsea, London.

== Works ==
His reports in Chancery were published in 1740, 1741, and 1742; and his Reports of Cases adjudged in the King's Bench, from 12 Geo. I to 7 Geo. II, were published in two volumes in 1744. The Chancery reports are important for containing the decisions of Lord Hardwicke.

== Reputation ==
Sir James Burrow said that Lord Mansfield forbade the citing of Barnardiston's reports in Chancery, for fear of misleading students, since none of his reports were correct throughout. In the following century Lord Lyndhurst recalled that when he was a young barrister it was said that the reports were actually nonsense scribbled by a practical joker in the Serjeant's notebook while he was taking a nap. Lord Manners, on the other hand, said: "Although Barnardiston is not considered a very correct reporter, yet some of his cases are very accurately reported;" and Lord Eldon said that some of the reports were "of very great authority".

Barnardiston's King's Bench reports have also been repeatedly denounced, but also frequently cited.
