= John Ranby =

English surgeon and writer (1703–1733)

John Ranby (1703–1773) was an English surgeon, who served in the household of King George II and wrote books on surgery. His influence helped to instigate a corporation of surgeons distinct from barbers.

== Life ==
The son of Joseph Ranby of St. Giles-in-the-Fields in Middlesex, an innholder, he put himself apprentice to Edward Barnard, foreign brother of the Company of Barber-Surgeons, on 5 April 1715. On 5 October 1722 he was examined on his skill in surgery. His answers were approved, and he was ordered the seal of the Barber Surgeons Company as a foreign brother.

He was elected a Fellow of the Royal Society on 30 November 1724. He was appointed surgeon-in-ordinary to the king's household in 1738, and in 1740 he was promoted sergeant-surgeon to George II. He became principal sergeant-surgeon in May 1743, and in this capacity accompanied the king in the German campaign of that year. He was present at the battle of Dettingen, and there had as a patient Prince William, Duke of Cumberland, the king's second son.

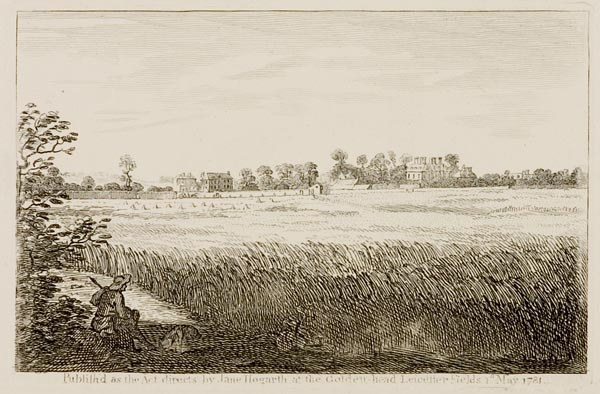
Engraving by William Hogarth from the 1750s, view of John Ranby's house at Chiswick.

In 1745 Ranby's interest with the king and the government of the day helped the passing of the act of parliament constituting a corporation of surgeons distinct from that of the barbers. He was the nominated as the first master of the newly founded surgeons' company, though he had held no office in the old and united company of Barber-Surgeons. Joseph Sandford, the senior warden of the old company, and William Cheselden, the junior warden, took office under him as the first wardens. He was re-elected master of the company in 1751, when the company entered into occupation of their new theatre in the Old Bailey, and for a third time in 1752. Ranby was appointed surgeon to the Chelsea Hospital on 13 May 1752 in succession to Cheselden.

John Ranby died on 28 August 1773, after a few hours' illness, at his apartments in Chelsea Hospital, and was buried in the south-west portion of the burying-ground attached to the hospital, in a square sandstone tomb with a simple inscription.

== Reputation ==
Ranby had a large surgical practice, and Henry Fielding introduced him into Tom Jones. He was a man of strong passions, harsh voice, and inelegant manners. Queen Caroline of Ansbach called him "the blockhead" before submitting to an operation for hernia, of which she died.

Messenger Monsey, a fellow medic, had a low moral opinion of him: "Ra[i]nby was the only man I ever heard coolly defend the use of laudanum in effecting his designs on women, which he confessed he had practised with success."

== Works ==
- The Method of Treating Gunshot Wounds. London, 1744, 2nd edit. 1760; 3rd edit. 1781; an account of some of the surgical cases which came under Ranby's care when he served under Lord Stair in the German campaign up to the battle of Dettingen. He extols the use of Peruvian bark in the suppuration following upon gunshot wounds, and makes observes that its virtue is increased if the elixir of vitriol be given with it; he thus anticipates the use of quinine. He also gives a detailed account of a wound in the leg sustained by the Duke of Cumberland; and relates cases of death from tetanus occurring after gunshot wounds. The book was translated into French by Pierre Demours a year after its first edition.
- A Narrative of the last illness of the Earl of Orford, from May 1744 to the day of his decease, 18 March following, London, 1745; 2nd edit. 1745. This pamphlet, relating to the last illness of Sir Robert Walpole, gave offence to the physicians, for utterly condemning the use of the lithontryptic lixivium in the treatment of the stone.
- The True Account of all the Transactions before the Right Honourable the Lords and others Commissioners for the affairs of Chelsea Hospital as far as relates to the Admission and Dismission of Sam. Lee, Surgeon, London, 1754. This work mentions the methods adopted by a hernia-curing quack to whom the government of the day had paid large sums of money.
- Three Curious Dissections by John Ranby, esq., Surgeon to His Majesty's Household and F.R.S. 1728, printed in William Beckett's ‘Collection of Chirurgical Tracts, London, 1740.
- Paper in the Philosophical Transactions, 1731, vol. xxxvii.

== Family ==
Ranby married, in 1729, Jane, the elder daughter of the Hon. Dacre Barrett-Lennard. An illegitimate son, John Ranby (1743–1820), became known as a pamphleteer. His daughter Hannah married Walter Waring, MP for Bishops Castle and Coventry.

== Notes ==
Attribution

This article incorporates text from a publication now in the public domain: Lee, Sidney, ed. (1896). "Ranby, John". Dictionary of National Biography. Vol. 47. London: Smith, Elder & Co.
