= George Andrews (adjutant general) =

United States Army general

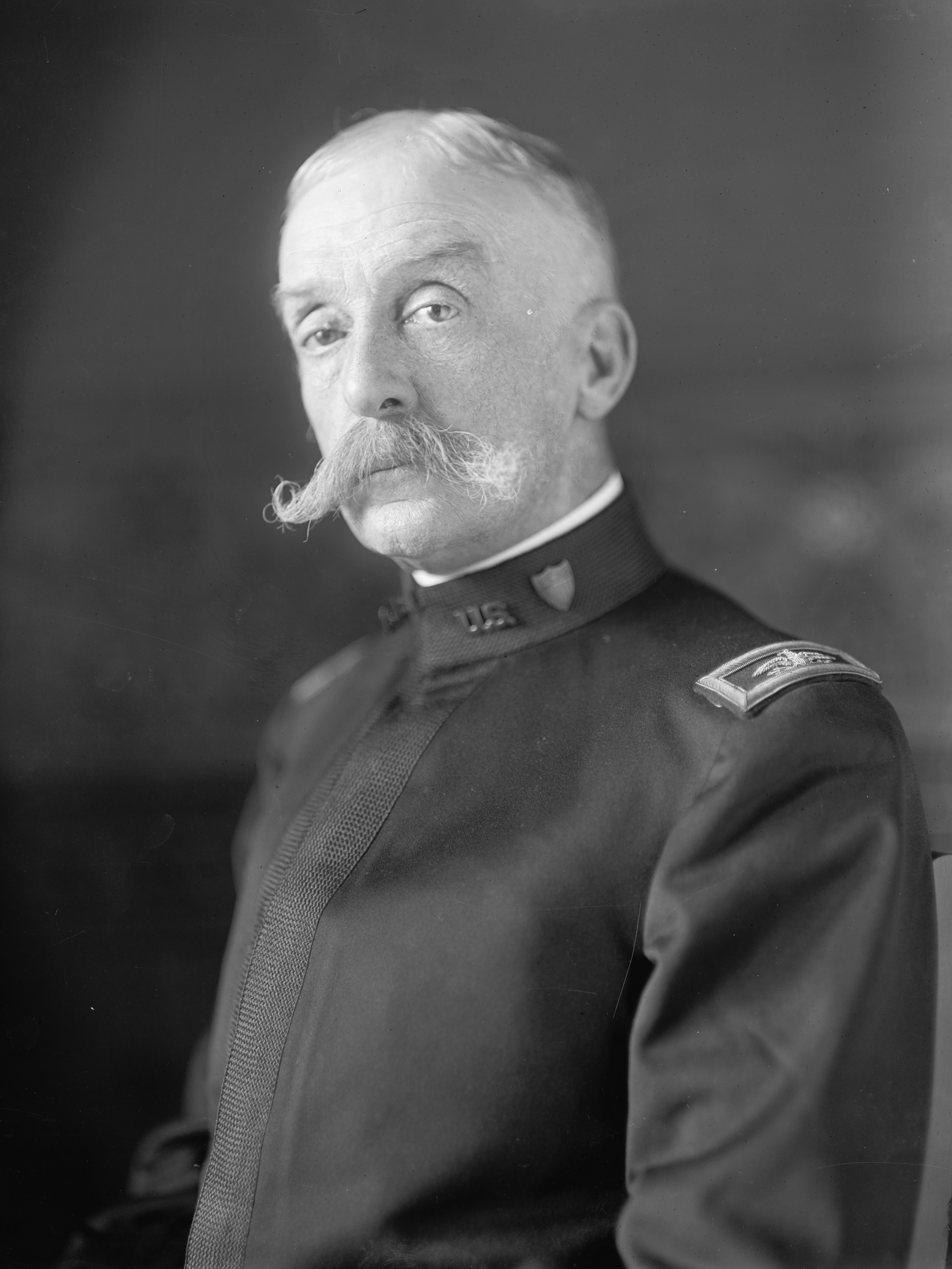
- George Andrews
- Born: August 26, 1850; Providence, Rhode Island, US
- Died: September 10, 1928 (aged 78); Washington, D.C., US
- Burial place: Arlington National Cemetery
- Military career
- Allegiance: United States of America
- Branch: United States Army
- Service years: 1876–1914
- Rank: Brigadier General
- Commands: Adjutant General of the U.S. Army
- Conflicts: American Indian Wars; Spanish–American War

George Andrews (August 26, 1850 – September 10, 1928) was an American military officer who was Adjutant General of the United States Army from 1912 to 1914.

== Life and career ==
Andrews was born in Providence, Rhode Island, the son of Colonel George Lippitt Andrews.

He graduated from the United States Military Academy in 1876, and was commissioned a second lieutenant in the 25th Infantry, serving at Fort Davis, Texas and Fort Randall, South Dakota.

He served as Professor of Military Science and Tactics at Brooks Military Academy of Ohio from 1881 to 1883, being promoted to first lieutenant in February 1883. Rejoining the regiment at Fort Snelling, Minnesota in September 1883, he became the regimental adjutant in August 1886. The regiment moved to Fort Missoula, Montana in September 1889, and Andrews was promoted to captain in September 1892. He served on duty with the Ohio Army National Guard from 1896 to 1898.

In February 1898 Andrews transferred to the Adjutant General's Department and was promoted to major, serving as adjutant general for the Department of the Missouri, and later for the Department of the East and in Cuba. He served in the Adjutant General's Office in Washington, D.C. from September 1900 to October 1902, and was promoted to lieutenant colonel in February 1901. He served as adjutant general for the Department of California from October 1902 to January 1904, receiving a promotion to colonel in August 1903. He then served as adjutant general for the Pacific Division from January 1904 to November 1905 when he became adjutant general for the Philippines Division.

He was a Hereditary Companion of the California Commandery of the Military Order of the Loyal Legion of the United States and a Compatriot of the Rhode Island Society of the Sons of the American Revolution.

Andrews continued to serve in various departmental adjutant roles from 1908 to August 1912 when he was appointed as Adjutant General of the United States Army with the rank of brigadier general.

He retired in August 1914, and died in September 1928 in Washington, D.C. He is buried in Arlington National Cemetery.

== See also ==
- List of Adjutant Generals of the U.S. Army

Military offices
Preceded by William P. Hall	Adjutant General of the U. S. Army; August 5, 1912 – August 27, 1914	Succeeded by Henry P. McCain
