= The Reporters (book) =

The Reporters is a book on the subject of law reporters, written by John William Wallace.

== Nineteenth-century reviews ==
In 1847, J. G. Marvin said of the second edition, revised, of this book:

Mr. Wallace has embodied, in one hundred pages, more useful information respecting the Reporters, than can be found in any single publication whatever. Mr. Sumner contributed two articles in the 8th and 12th volumes of the American Jurist, upon Legal Bibliography, and Mr. Ram, in his work entitled The Science of Legal Judgement, collects many judicial criticisms upon the Reports and elementary law book, but in point of fulness of illustration, and appropriateness of comment, Mr. Wallace's volume, as to the Reporters, surpasses all that had previously been done. He confines his illustrations chiefly to the Reports, from the earliest period of reporting in England, to the close of the reign of Geo. II. Prefixed to the more immediate subject matter of the work, are some remarks upon the value to be placed upon the incidental observations of the Bench upon the merits of the Reporters, the original language in which the Reports were taken, the sources from whence the MSS. of the published volumes were obtained, and a general survey of the laborers in the "old fields, out of which the new corn must come." The work is written in a peculiar, and happy style, and impresses the reader favourably with the author's abundant reading, and aptness for communicating this species of information. The volume lacks only one thing, an Index. 6 L. R. 425.

In 1882, the New Jersey Law Journal said of the fourth edition, revised and enlarged, of this book:

A new edition of The Reporters is of real importance as a means of keeping alive a knowledge of the old reports. In the multiplication of law reports, made almost by machinery, there is a danger that the younger Bar will overlook the old Reporters and miss the treasures which they contain, and so have no acquaintance with the sources of the law. The Reporters is a delightful book - the last edition is even more entertaining than the others - and if it is only to be easily obtained it cannot fail of being generally read.

== Twentieth-century reviews ==
In 1988, Bookman's Yearbook said that this book was "well worth using".

Glanville Williams described this book as a "detailed monograph".

The Harvard Law Review said, in relation to Year-Book bibliography, that this book discloses little that is valuable and its accuracy does not stand the test of verification.
