= English Reports =

Collection of English law reports

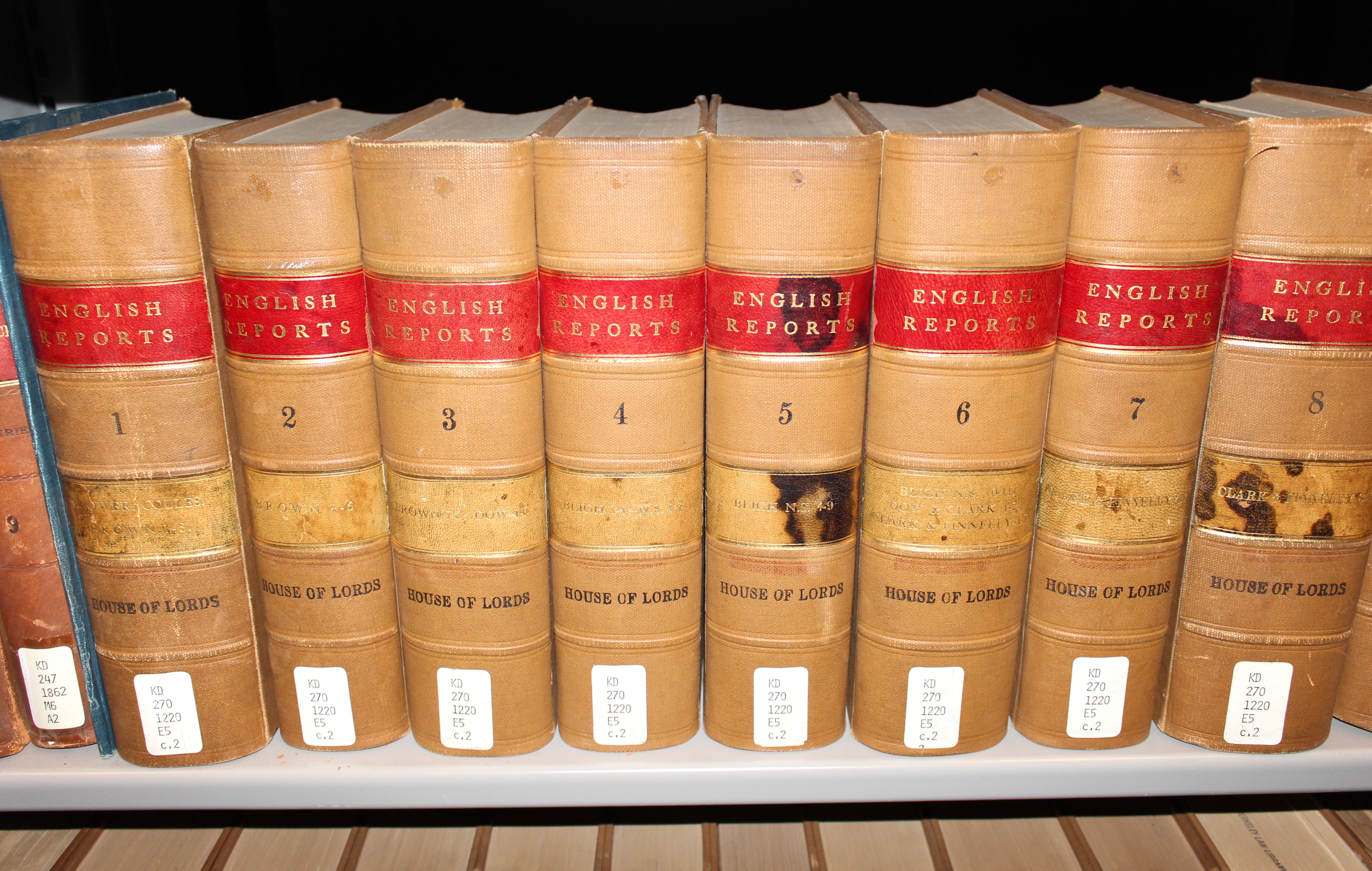
A few volumes of the English Reports at a law library

The English Reports is a collection of judgments of the higher English courts between 1220 and 1866.

== Overview ==
The reports are a selection of most nominate reports of judgments of the higher English courts between 1220 and 1873. They reproduce many reports not from their original editions but from dependable, although not always verbatim, later editions and give a nominate report citation.

It was published in 178 volumes gradually from 1900 to 1932 by Stevens & Sons in London and by William Green & Sons in Edinburgh.

== Citation of these reports ==
For citation in most Commonwealth countries it is cited in written form as "ER", as in Planché v Colburn (1831) 131 ER 305. Sometimes the original nominate report citation is also used in parallel.

The compendium is sometimes cited in U.S. courts, where it is normally cited by using the original nominate report citation then Eng. Rep., as in Planché v. Colburn, 8 Bing. 14, 131 Eng. Rep. 305 (C.P. 1831).

== Index chart ==
Its 1930 index chart details where each volume of the nominate reports is drawn upon for the 13-category series the work creates. This named each by their most popular title — many bore several and were frequently and variously abbreviated. A full, disambiguatory chart is published by Professional Books.

== Series ==
Volumes	Series	Period covered
1 to 11	House of Lords	1694 to 1866
12 to 20	Privy Council (includes Indian Appeals)	1809 to 1865
21 to 47	Court of Chancery (includes Collateral Reports)	1557 to 1865
48 to 55	Rolls Court	1829 to 1865
56 to 71	Vice-Chancellors' Courts	1815 to 1865
72 to 122	Court of King's Bench (or Queen's Bench)	1378 to 1865
123 to 144	Court of Common Pleas	1486 to 1865
145 to 160	Court of Exchequer	1220 to 1865
161 to 167	Ecclesiastical	1752 to 1857
161 to 167	Admiralty	1776 to 1840
161 to 167	Probate and Divorce	1858 to 1865
168 and 169	Crown Cases Reserved	1743 to 1865
170 to 176	Nisi Prius	1688 to 1867
177 and 178	Index of Cases	N/A

== See also ==
- Law report: England and Wales
