= John Gage Marvin =

American lawyer and bibliographer (1815–1855)

John Gage Marvin (1815–1855) was an American lawyer, legal bibliographer and figure in the history of California.

== Early life and education ==
He was born in Le Raysville, Pennsylvania and was educated at Wesleyan University in Connecticut. He then taught at Athens Academy, Athens, Pennsylvania from 1840. Three of his brothers attended the school, and a fourth worked the farm at Le Raysville.

In 1842, Marvin enrolled at Harvard Law School from an address given in Towanda, Pennsylvania, and was there for four years, studying under Simon Greenleaf, Joseph Story and Charles Sumner. He graduated LL.B. in 1846, having served as Librarian. Marvin was the last beneficiary (1843–5) of a system of student librarians, set up in 1830, who had a rent-free room in Dane Hall and received payment for their services to the Harvard Law Library.

== In California ==
Towards the end of the Mexican–American War, Marvin left his Boston law practice for the West Coast. He was with the Quartermaster Corps of the United States Army. He left the military in 1849, becoming editor of the Sonora Herald, and settling in Tuolumne County. Known locally as "Judge Marvin", he became a prominent citizen and part-time official.

Marvin laid out the settlement of Empire City on the Tuolumne River in Stanislaus County, California (at that time in Tuolumne County). It became the county seat of the new Stanislaus County in 1854, and an army supply center.

Marvin was the first California State Superintendent of Public Instruction. He came to San Jose at the end of 1850 to assume the position, finding nothing of which he could take charge. There was a legislative vacuum, which he proceeded to fill through the state legislature in stop-gap fashion, having consulted John C. Pelton who had recently set up a school in San Francisco. A clumsy and much amended school bill of 1851 was signed into law by Governor John McDougall, as California's first schools legislation.

Financial problems remained for public education, and Marvin had the state vote $50,000 in 1852. A second school law created a board of education. At the 1853 state Democratic convention, Paul K. Hubbs was nominated for Superintendent of Public Instruction ahead of Marvin. A John G. Marvin Elementary School is now in San Diego, founded in 1956.

Concurrently with his activities on behalf of education, Marvin associated with Jim Savage. At the end of the Mariposa War, he became quartermaster of the King's River Reservation, and business partner of Savage. Marvin was present at the quarrel between Savage and Walter Harvey in 1852, when Harvey shot Savage dead.

== Death ==
He died in the Kingdom of Hawaii in 1855 or 1857, depending on the source.

== Works ==
- Edition of a work on international law by Sir James Mackintosh, with reading list (1843)
- Catalogue of the Harvard Law Library including recent accessions (1846)
- Legal Bibliography, or A thesaurus of American, English, Irish, and Scotch law books (1847) - This is his best known work and is alphabetical by author, with a topical index, and includes evaluative comments on the works, drawing on numerous sources. Despite the impression given by its short title, the Bibliography was an attempt to integrate other legal works into the Anglo-American tradition.
