= Smith's Prize =

Prize from University of Cambridge in mathematics and theoretical physics

Smith's Prize was the name of each of two prizes awarded annually to two research students in mathematics and theoretical physics at the University of Cambridge from 1769. Following the reorganization in 1998, they are now awarded under the names Smith-Knight Prize and Rayleigh-Knight Prize.

== History ==
The Smith Prize fund was founded by bequest of Robert Smith upon his death in 1768, having by his will left £3,500 of South Sea Company stock to the University. Every year two or more junior Bachelor of Arts students who had made the greatest progress in mathematics and natural philosophy were to be awarded a prize from the fund. The prize was awarded every year from 1769 to 1998 except 1917.

From 1769 to 1885, the prize was awarded for the best performance in a series of examinations. In 1854 George Stokes included an examination question on a particular theorem that William Thomson had written to him about, which is now known as Stokes' theorem. T. W. Körner notes

Only a small number of students took the Smith's prize examination in the nineteenth century. When Karl Pearson took the examination in 1879, the examiners were Stokes, Maxwell, Cayley, and Todhunter and the examinees went on each occasion to an examiner's dwelling, did a morning paper, had lunch there and continued their work on the paper in the afternoon.

In 1885, the examination was renamed Part III, (now known as the Master of Advanced Study in Mathematics for students who studied outside of Cambridge before taking it) and the prize was awarded for the best submitted essay rather than examination performance. According to Barrow-Green

By fostering an interest in the study of applied mathematics, the competition contributed towards the success in mathematical physics that was to become the hallmark of Cambridge mathematics during the second half of the nineteenth century.

In the twentieth century, the competition stimulated postgraduate research in mathematics in Cambridge and the competition has played a significant role by providing a springboard for graduates considering an academic career. The majority of prize-winners have gone on to become professional mathematicians or physicists.

The Rayleigh Prize was an additional prize, which was awarded for the first time in 1911.

The Smith's and Rayleigh prizes were only available to Cambridge graduate students who had been undergraduates at Cambridge. The J.T. Knight Prize was established in 1974 for Cambridge graduates who had been undergraduates at other universities. The prize commemorates J.T. Knight (1942–1970), who had been an undergraduate student at Glasgow and a graduate student at Cambridge. He was killed in a motor car accident in Ireland in April 1970.

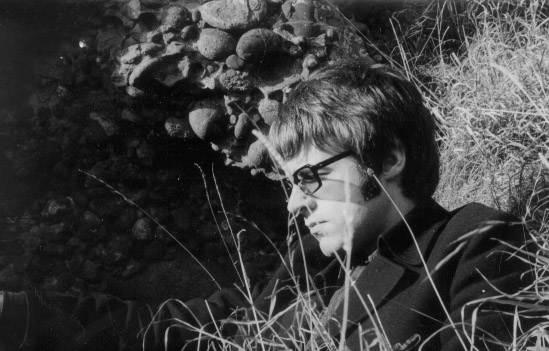
J.T. Knight

=== Value of the prizes ===
Originally, in 1769, the prizes were worth £25 each and remained at that level for 100 years. In 1867, they fell to £23 and in 1915 were still reported to be worth that amount. By 1930, the value had risen to about £30, and by 1940, the value had risen by a further one pound to £31. By 1998, a Smith's Prize was worth around £250.

In 2007, the value of the three prize funds was roughly £175,000.

=== Reorganization of prizes ===
In 1998 the Smith Prize, Rayleigh Prize and J. T. Knight Prize were replaced by the Smith-Knight Prize and Rayleigh-Knight Prize, the standard for the former being higher than that required for the latter.

== Smith's Prize recipients ==
For the period up to 1940 a complete list is given in Barrow-Green (1999) including titles of prize essays from 1889 to 1940. The following includes a selection from this list.

=== Awarded for examination performance ===
- 1769 George Atwood, Thomas Parkinson
- 1770 William Smith, James Oldershaw
- 1771 Thomas Starkie, Roger Keddington
- 1772 George Pretyman Tomline, John Lane
- 1773 John Jelland Brundish, George Whitmore
- 1774 Isaac Milner, Humphrey Waring
- 1775 Samuel Vince, Henry William Coulthurst
- 1776 John Oldershaw, W. Wright
- 1777 David Owen, John Baynes
- 1778 William Farish, William Taylor
- 1779 Thomas Jones, Herbert Marsh
- 1780 St John Priest, William Frend
- 1781 T. Catton, Henry Ainslie
- 1782 James Wood, John Hailstone
- 1783 Francis John Hyde Wollaston, Joseph Proctor
- 1784 Robert Acklom Ingram, John Holden
- 1785 William Lax, John Dudley
- 1786 John Bell, George Hutchinson
- 1787 Joseph Littledale, Algernon Frampton
- 1788 John Brinkley, Edmund Outram
- 1789 William Millers, Joseph Bewsher
- 1790 Bewick Bridge, Francis Wrangham
- 1791 Daniel Mitford Peacock, William Gooch
- 1792 John Palmer, George Frederick Tavel
- 1793 Thomas Harrison, Thomas Strickland
- 1794 George Butler, John Singleton Copley
- 1795 Robert Woodhouse, William Atthill
- 1796 John Kempthorne, William Dealtry
- 1797 John Hudson, John Lowthian
- 1798 Thomas Sowerby, Robert Martin
- 1799 William Fuller Boteler, John Brown
- 1800 James Inman, George D’Oyley
- 1801 Henry Martyn, William Woodall
- 1802 Thomas Penny White, John Grisdale
- 1803 Thomas Starkie, Charles James Hoare
- 1804 William Albin Garratt, John Kaye
- 1805 Samuel Hunter Christie, Thomas Turton Ð
- 1806 J. F. Pollock, Henry Walter
- 1807 Henry Gipps, John Carr
- 1808 Henry Bickersteth, Miles Bland
- 1809 Edward Hall Alderson, G. C. Gorham, John Standly
- 1810 William Henry Maule, Thomas Shaw Brandreth
- 1811 Thomas Edward Dicey, William French
- 1812 Cornelius Neale, Joseph William Jordan
- 1813 John Herschel, George Peacock
- 1814 Richard Gwatkin, Henry Wilkinson
- 1815 Charles George Frederick Leicester Frederick Calvert
- 1816 Edward Jacob, William Whewell
- 1817 John Thomas Austen, Temple Chevallier
- 1818 John George Shaw-Lefevre, John Hind
- 1819 Joshua King, George Miles Cooper
- 1820 Henry Coddington, Charles Smith Bird
- 1821 Henry Melvill, Solomon Atkinson
- 1822 Hamnett Holditch, Mitford Peacock
- 1823 George Biddell Airy, Charles Jeffreys
- 1824 John Cowling, James Bowstead
- 1825 James Challis, W. Williamson
- 1826 William Law, William Henry Hanson
- 1827 Thomas Turner, Henry Percy Gordon
- 1828 Charles Perry, John Bailey
- 1829 William Cavendish, Henry Philpott
- 1830 Edward Horatio Steventon, James William Lucas Heaviside
- 1831 Samuel Earnshaw, Thomas Gaskin
- 1832 Douglas Denon Heath, Samuel Laing
- 1833 Alexander Ellice, Joseph Bowstead
- 1834 Philip Kelland, Thomas Rawson Birks
- 1835 Henry Cotterill, Henry Goulburn
- 1836 Archibald Smith, John William Colenso
- 1837 William Nathaniel Griffin Edward Brumell
- 1838 Thomas John Main James George Mould
- 1839 Percival Frost Benjamin Morgan Cowie
- 1841 George Gabriel Stokes
- 1842 Arthur Cayley
- 1843 John Couch Adams
- 1845 William Thomson and Stephen Parkinson
- 1848 Isaac Todhunter and Alfred Barry
- 1852 Peter Guthrie Tait and Steele
- 1853 Thomas Bond Sprague and Robert Braithwaite Batty
- 1854 James Clerk Maxwell and Edward John Routh
- 1860 James Stirling
- 1861 William Steadman Aldis
- 1863 Robert Romer
- 1865 John Strutt
- 1868 John Fletcher Moulton and George Howard Darwin
- 1869 John Eliot
- 1870 Alfred George Greenhill and Richard Pendlebury
- 1872 Horace Lamb
- 1874 W. W. Rouse Ball
- 1875 William Burnside (first ) and George Chrystal (second)
- 1878 John Edward Aloysius Steggall
- 1880 Joseph Larmor and J. J. Thomson

=== Awarded for essay ===
- 1885 Robert Lachlan
- 1886 Robert Franklin Muirhead
- 1888 Alfred Dixon
- 1889 Henry Baker
- 1891 Hector Munro Macdonald and R. A. Sampson
- 1895 George Thomas Manley
- 1896 W.S.Adie, Archibald Young Gipps Campbell and F. W. Lawrence
- 1897 E. T. Whittaker
- 1898 Ernest Barnes and Richard Cockburn Maclaurin
- 1901 G. H. Hardy and James Hopwood Jeans (equal)
- 1904 Ebenezer Cunningham
- 1905 Harry Bateman
- 1906 George Rivers Blanco White
- 1907 Arthur Stanley Eddington
- 1908 J. E. Littlewood and James Mercer
- 1909 Herbert Turnbull and George Neville Watson
- 1910 William Edward Hodgson Berwick
- 1911 George Henry Livens
- 1912 E. H. Neville, Louis Mordell
- 1913 Sydney Chapman
- 1914 Bhupati Mohan Sen
- 1915 Harold Jeffreys
- 1918 Edward Lindsay Ince and K. Ananda Rau
- 1921 Albert Ingham and William Michael Herbert Greaves
- 1922 Edward Arthur Milne
- 1923 John Charles Burkill
- 1925 Llewellyn Hilleth Thomas
- 1927 Sydney Goldstein
- 1929 John Macnaughten Whittaker and Harold Douglas Ursell
- 1930 John Arthur Todd and Raymond Paley
- 1931 H.S.M Coxeter
- 1935 Henry G. Booker and Leslie Howarth
- 1936 Alan Turing and E.A. Green
- 1937 E.R. Love and H.R. Pitt
- 1938 Fred Hoyle
- 1939 T.A. Easterfield and HNV Temperley
- 1940 I. J. Good and R. E. Macpherson
- 1949 Derek Taunt
- 1950 Abdus Salam and Brian Haselgrove
- 1952 Michael P. Drazin
- 1957 Philip Gerald Drazin, John Robert Ringrose
- 1960 Keith Moffatt and Ian Hacking
- 1962 Jayant Narlikar and John Kingman
- 1967 Stephen Watson
- 1969 C.J.S. Clarke, P.G. Dixon, C.J. Myerscough, A.R. White and J.S. Wilson
- 1970 Gordon Douglass James
- 1971 Douglas C. Heggie
- 1972 Brian L. N. Kennett and Andrew Ranicki
- 1975 Brian D. Ripley
- 1976 Roger Heath-Brown and Bernard Silverman
- 1978 James Stirling
- 1988 Andrew W Woods
- 1994 Group 1: G.J. McCaughan. Group 2: P.A. Shah and S.M. Tobias. Group 3: R.A. Battye and D.R.D. Scott.
- 1996 Gordon Ian Ogilvie and Stephen Hewson
- 1998 S. M. Blanchflower and J. A. Dee

== Rayleigh Prize recipients ==
A more complete list of Rayleigh prize recipients is given in Appendix 1 ("List of Prize Winners and their Essays 1885–1940") of

- 1913 Ralph H. Fowler
- 1923 Edward Collingwood
- 1927 William McCrea
- 1930 Harold Davenport
- 1937 David Stanley Evans
- 1951 Gabriel Andrew Dirac
- 1980 David Benson
- 1982 Susan Stepney
- 1994 Group 4: J.D. King, A.P. Martin. Group 5: K.M. Croudace, J.R. Elliot.
- 1998 P. Bolchover, O. T. Johnson, R. W. Verrill, R. Bhattacharyya, U. A. Salam, S. A. Wright and T. J. Hunt

== J. T. Knight Prize recipients ==
- 1974 Cameron Leigh Stewart Allan J. Clarke
- 1975 Frank Kelly and Ian Sobey
- 1976 Trevor McDougall
- 1977 Gerard Murphy
- 1981 Bruce Allen and Philip K. Pollett
- 1983 Ya-xiang Yuan
- 1985 Reinhard Diestel
- 1987 Qin Sheng (mathematician)
- 1988 Somak Raychaudhury
- 1989 Giampiero Esposito
- 1990 Darryn W. Waugh
- 1991 Renzo L. Ricca
- 1992 Grant Lythe, Christophe Pichon, Henrik O. Rasmussen
- 1993 Anastasios Christou Petkou
- 1994 Group 1: M. Gaberdiel, Y. Liu. Group 3: H.A. Chamblin. Group 4: P.P. Avelino, S.G. Lack, A.L. Sydenham. Group 5: S. Keras, U. Meyer, G.M. Pritchard, H. Ramanathan, K. Strobl. Group 6: A.O. Bender, V. Toledano Laredo.
- 1996 Conor Houghton, Thomas Manke
- 1997 Arno Schindlmayr
- 1998 A. Bejancu, G. M. Keith, J. Sawon, D. R. Brecher, T. S. H. Leinster, S. Slijepcevic, K. K. Damodaran, A. R. Mohebalhojeh, C. T. Snydal, F. De Rooij, O. Pikhurko, David K. H. Tan, P. R. Hiemer, T. Prestidge, F. Wagner, Viet Ha Hoàng, A. W. Rempel and Jium-Huei Proty Wu

== Smith–Knight Prize recipients ==
- 1999 D. W. Essex, H. S. Reall, A. Saikia, A. C. Faul, Duncan C. Richer, M. J. Vartiainen, T. A. Fisher, J. Rosenzweig, J. Wierzba and J. B. Gutowski
- 2001 B. J. Green, T A. Mennim, A. Mijatovic, F. A. Dolan, Paul D. Metcalfe and S. R. Tod
- 2002 Konstantin Ardakov, Edward Crane and Simon Wadsley
- 2004 Neil Roxburgh
- 2005 David Conlon
- 2008 Miguel Paulos Civil servant Wilalop Senajamnong
- 2009 Olga Goulko
- 2010 Miguel Custódio
- 2011 Ioan Manolescu
- 2014 Bhargav P. Narayanan
- 2016 Julius B. Kirkegaard
- 2018 Theodor Bjorkmo, Muntazir Abidi, Amelia Drew, Leong Khim Wong
- 2020 Jef Laga, Kasia Warburton, Daniel Zhang, Shayan Iranipour
- 2021 David Gwilym Baker, Hannah Banks, Jason Joykutty, Andreas Schachner, Mohammed Rifath Khan Shafi

== Rayleigh–Knight Prize recipients ==
- 1999 C. D. Bloor, R. Oeckl, J. Y. Whiston, Y-C. Chen, P. L. Rendon, C. Wunderer, J. H. P. Dawes, D. M. Rodgers, H-M. Gutmann and A. N. Ross
- 2001 A. F. R. Bain, S. Khan, S. Schafer-Nameki, N. R. Farr, J. Niesen, J. H. Siggers, M. Fayers, D. Oriti, M. J. Tildesley, J. R. Gair, M. R. E. H. Pickles, A. J. Tolley, S. R. Hodges, R. Portugues, C. Voll, M. Kampp, P. J. P. Roche and B. M. J. B. Walker
- 2004 Oliver Rinne
- 2005 Guillaume Pierre Bascoul and Giuseppe Di Graziano
- 2007 Anders Hansen and Vladimir Lazić

== See also ==
- List of mathematics awards
