= Senior Wrangler =

Top mathematics undergraduate at Cambridge University

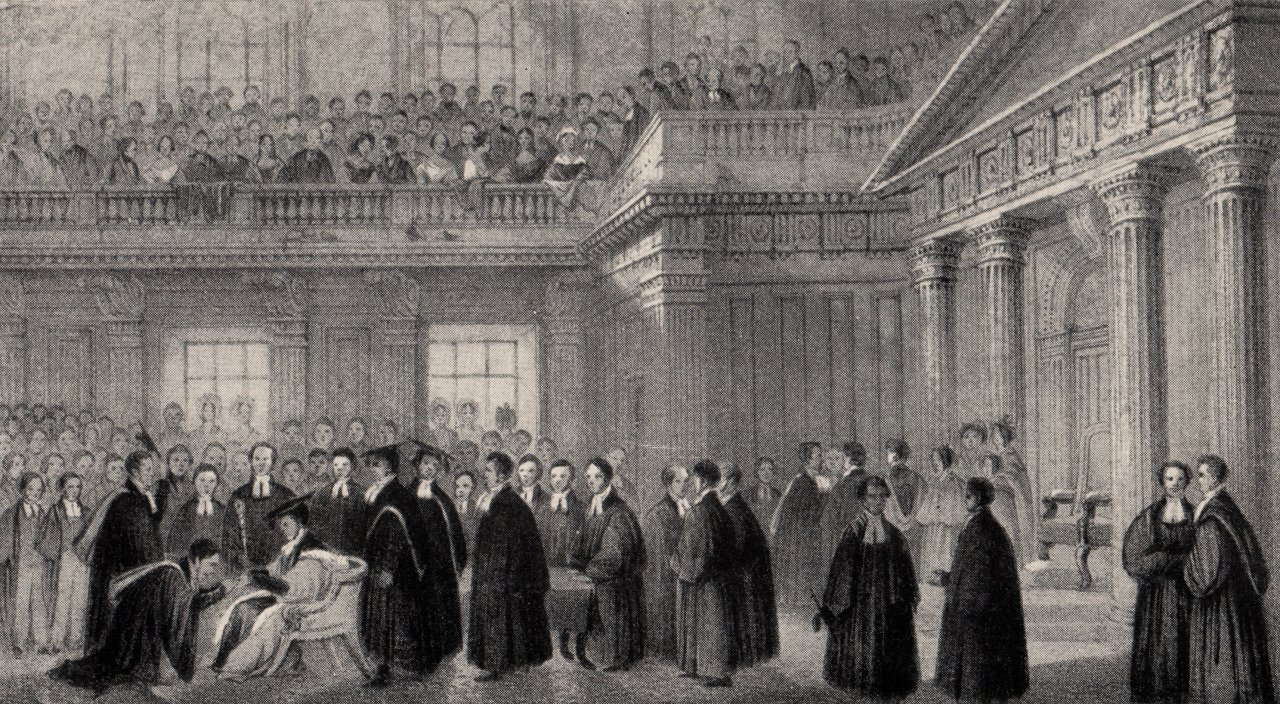
1842 in the Senate House, Cambridge: the Senior Wrangler, achiever of "academic supremacy" (here, Arthur Cayley), is admitted to his degree as the top scorer in the university's final-year examinations in mathematics.

2013 in the same room: the examiner announces the results of the same examinations. In keeping with recent tradition, he raises his academic cap to identify the Senior Wrangler (here, Arran Fernandez); at the end he follows the older tradition of throwing printed notices of the results from the balcony.

The Senior Wrangler is the top mathematics undergraduate at the University of Cambridge in England, a position which has been described as "the greatest intellectual achievement attainable in Britain".

Specifically, it is the person who achieves the highest overall mark among the Wranglers – the students at Cambridge who gain first-class degrees in mathematics. The Cambridge undergraduate mathematics course, or Mathematical Tripos, is famously difficult.

Many Senior Wranglers went on to become prominent figures in mathematics and other sciences. They include astronomers Sir John Herschel and Sir George Biddell Airy; physicists Sir Gilbert Walker, Sir George Stokes and Lord Rayleigh; and pure mathematicians such as Arthur Cayley, Ben Green and John Edensor Littlewood.

Senior Wranglers were once fêted with torchlit processions and took pride of place in the university's graduation ceremony. Years in Cambridge were often remembered by who had been Senior Wrangler that year.

The annual ceremony in which the Senior Wrangler becomes known was first held in the 18th century. Standing on the balcony of the university's Senate House, the examiner reads out the class results for mathematics, and printed copies of the results are then thrown to the audience below. The examiner no longer announces the students' exact rankings, but they still identify the Senior Wrangler, nowadays tipping their academic hat when reading out the person's name.

== Others who finished in the top 12 ==
Those who have achieved second place, known as Second Wranglers, include Alfred Marshall, James Clerk Maxwell, J. J. Thomson, Lord Kelvin, William Clifford, and William Whewell.

Those who have finished between third and 12th include Archibald Hill, Karl Pearson and William Henry Bragg (third), George Green, G. H. Hardy, and Alfred North Whitehead (fourth), Adam Sedgwick (fifth), John Venn (sixth), Bertrand Russell, Nevil Maskelyne and Sir James Timmins Chance (seventh), Thomas Malthus (ninth), and John Maynard Keynes and William Henry Fox Talbot (12th).

== History ==
Between 1748 and 1909 the university publicly announced the ranking, which was then reported in newspapers such as The Times. The examination was considered to be by far the most important in Britain and the Empire. The prestige of being a high Wrangler was great; the respect accorded to the Senior Wrangler was immense. Andrew Warwick, author of Masters of Theory, describes the term 'Senior Wrangler' as "synonymous with academic supremacy".

Since 1910 successful students in the examinations have been told their rankings privately, and not all Senior Wranglers have become publicly known as such. In recent years, the custom of discretion regarding ranking has progressively vanished, and all Senior Wranglers since 2010 have announced their identity publicly.

The youngest ever Senior Wrangler was Arran Fernandez in 2013, aged 18 years and 6 days. The previous youngest was probably James Wilkinson in 1939, aged 19 years and nine months. The youngest up to 1909 were Alfred Flux in 1887, aged 20 years and two months and Peter Tait in 1852, aged 20 years and eight months.

Two individuals have placed first without becoming known as Senior Wrangler. One was the student Philippa Fawcett in 1890. (She could not receive a degree from Cambridge due to being a woman, and so she could not be the senior wrangler. Cambridge did not offer degrees to women until 1948, and no woman became the senior wrangler until Ruth Hendry in 1992.) The other was the mathematics professor George Pólya. As he had contributed to reforming the Tripos with the aim that an excellent performance would be less dependent on solving hard problems and more so on showing a broad mathematical understanding and knowledge, G.H. Hardy asked Pólya to sit the examinations himself, unofficially, during his stay in England in 1924–5. Pólya did so, and to Hardy's surprise, received the highest mark, an achievement which, had he been a student, would have made him the Senior Wrangler.

== Derived uses of the term ==
Senior Wrangler's Walk is a path in Cambridge, the walk to and along which was considered to be sufficient constitutional exercise for a student aspiring to become the Senior Wrangler. The route was shorter than other walks, such as Wranglers' Walk and the Grantchester Grind, undertaken by undergraduates whose aspirations were lower.

Senior Wrangler sauce is a Cambridge term for brandy butter, a type of hard sauce made from brandy, butter, and sugar, traditionally served in Britain with Christmas pudding and warm mince pies.

Senior Wrangler is also the name of a solitaire card game, alternatively known as Mathematics and Double Calculation, played with two decks of cards and involving elementary modular arithmetic.

== Literary references ==
Fictional Senior Wranglers appearing in novels include Roger Hamley, a character in Elizabeth Gaskell's Wives and Daughters, and Tom Jericho, the cryptanalyst in Robert Harris's novel Enigma, who is described as having been Senior Wrangler in 1938. In Catherine Hall's The Proof of Love, Victor Turner is listed as having been Senior Wrangler in 1968.

In George Bernard Shaw's play Mrs. Warren's Profession, the title character's daughter Vivie is praised for "tieing with the third wrangler," and she comments that "the mathematical tripos" means "grind, grind, grind for six to eight hours a day at mathematics, and nothing but mathematics."

In Ford Madox Ford's Parade's End, the character Christopher Tietjens is described as having settled deliberately for only being Second Wrangler, to avoid the weight of expectation that the title would create.

In his Discworld series of novels, Terry Pratchett has a character called the Senior Wrangler, a faculty member at the Unseen University, whose first name is Horace.

The compiler of crosswords for The Leader in the 1930s used "Senior Wrangler" as a pseudonym.

== Coaches ==
The two most successful 19th-century coaches of Senior Wranglers were William Hopkins and Edward Routh. Hopkins, the 'Senior Wrangler Maker', who himself was the 7th Wrangler, coached 17 Senior Wranglers. Routh, who had himself been the Senior Wrangler, coached 27. Another, described by his student (and Senior Wrangler) J.E. Littlewood as "the last of the great coaches", was another Senior Wrangler, Robert Alfred Herman.

== Senior Wranglers and runners up, 1748–1909 ==
During 1748–1909 the top two colleges in terms of number of Senior Wranglers were Trinity and St John's with 56 and 54, respectively. Gonville and Caius was third with 13.

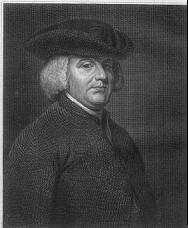
William Paley, Senior Wrangler, 1763.

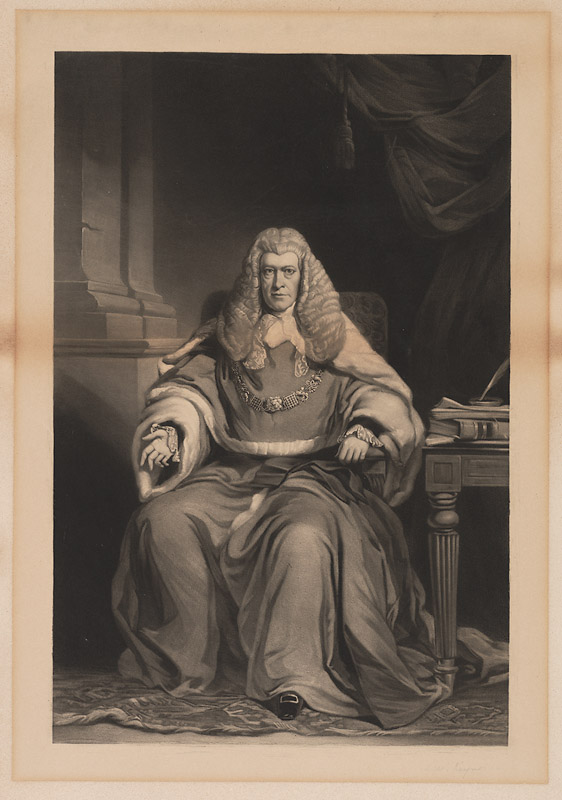
Sir Frederick Pollock, 1st Baronet, Senior Wrangler, 1806.

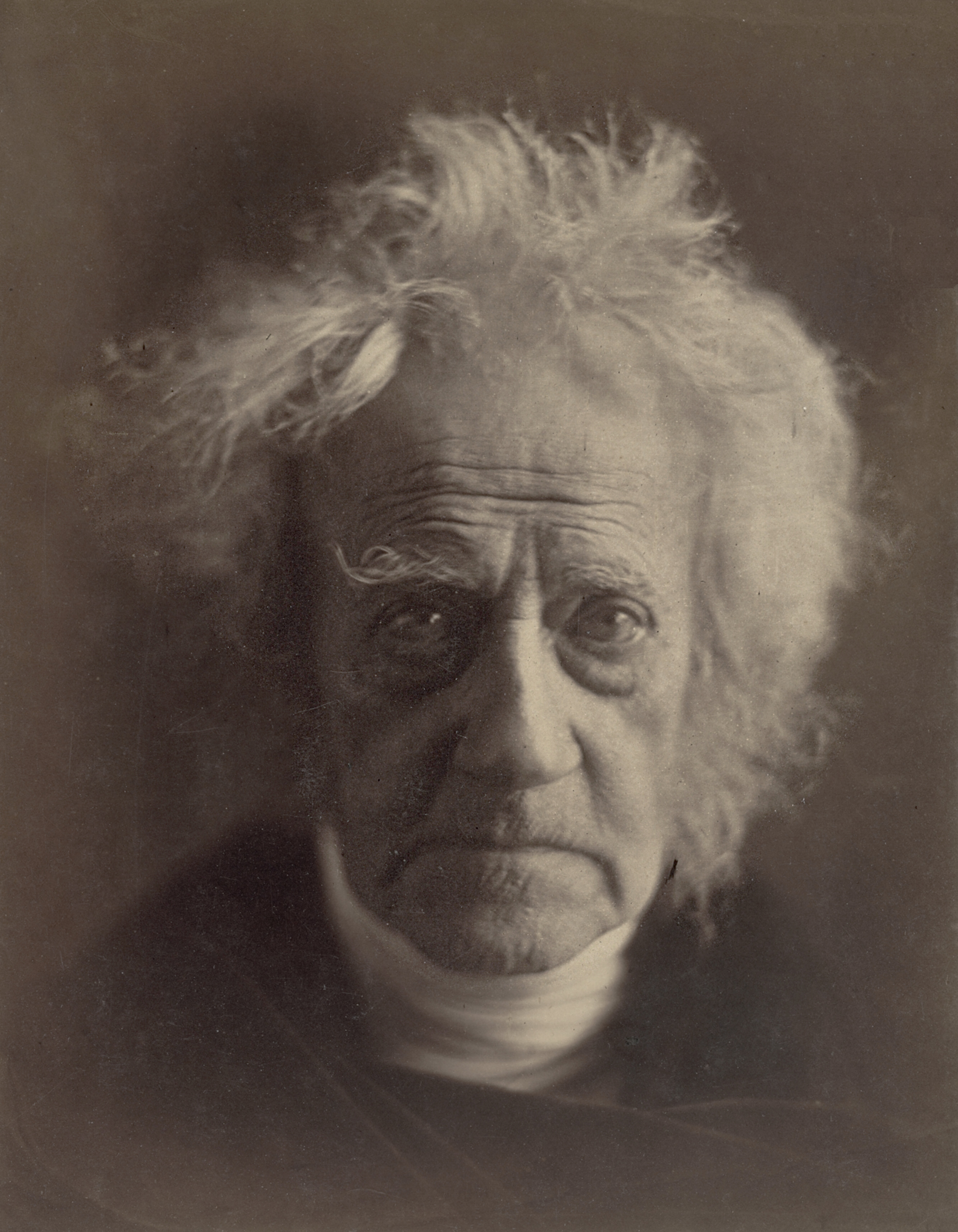
John Herschel, Senior Wrangler, 1813.

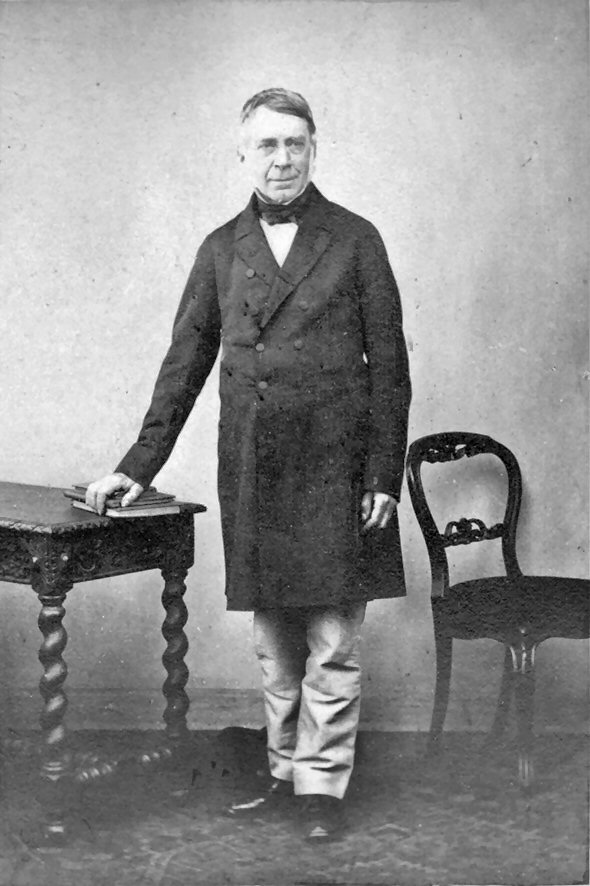
George Biddell Airy, Senior Wrangler, 1823.

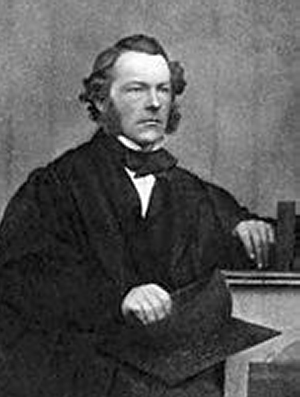
George Gabriel Stokes, Senior Wrangler, 1841.

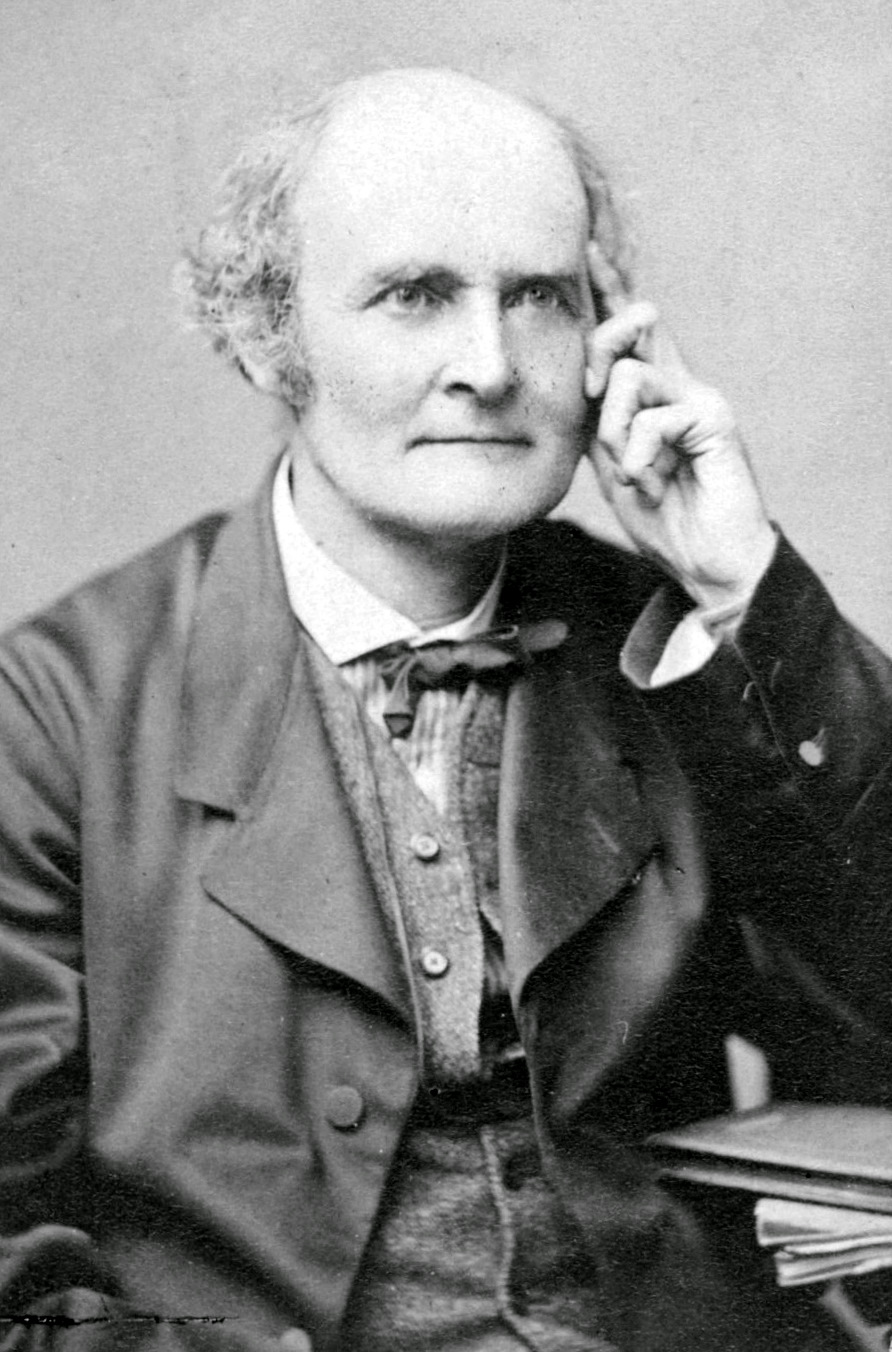
Arthur Cayley, Senior Wrangler, 1842.

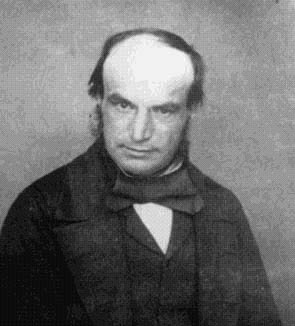
John Couch Adams, Senior Wrangler, 1843.

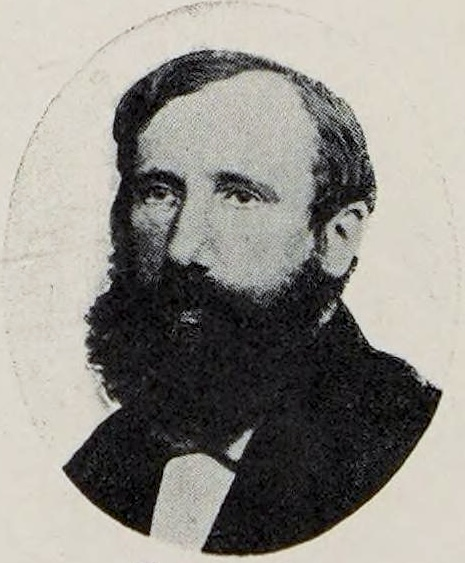
Isaac Todhunter, Senior Wrangler, 1848.

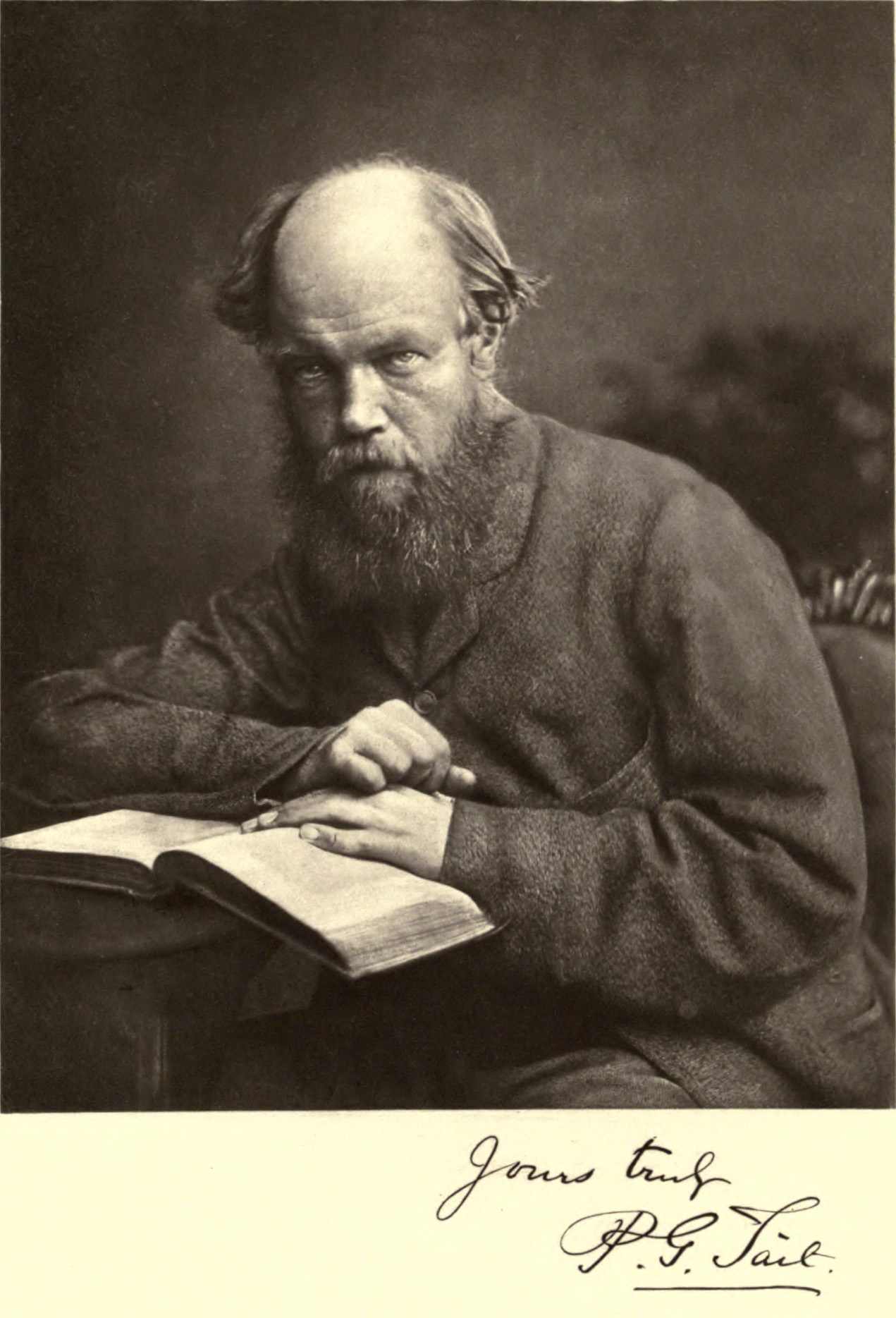
Peter Guthrie Tait, who at 20 years 8 months in 1852 was younger than all previous Senior Wranglers.

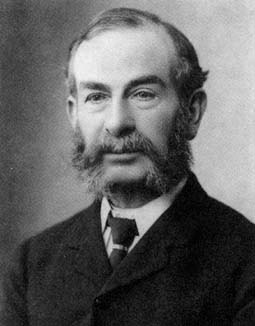
Edward Routh, Senior Wrangler in 1854 and coach to many subsequent Senior Wranglers.

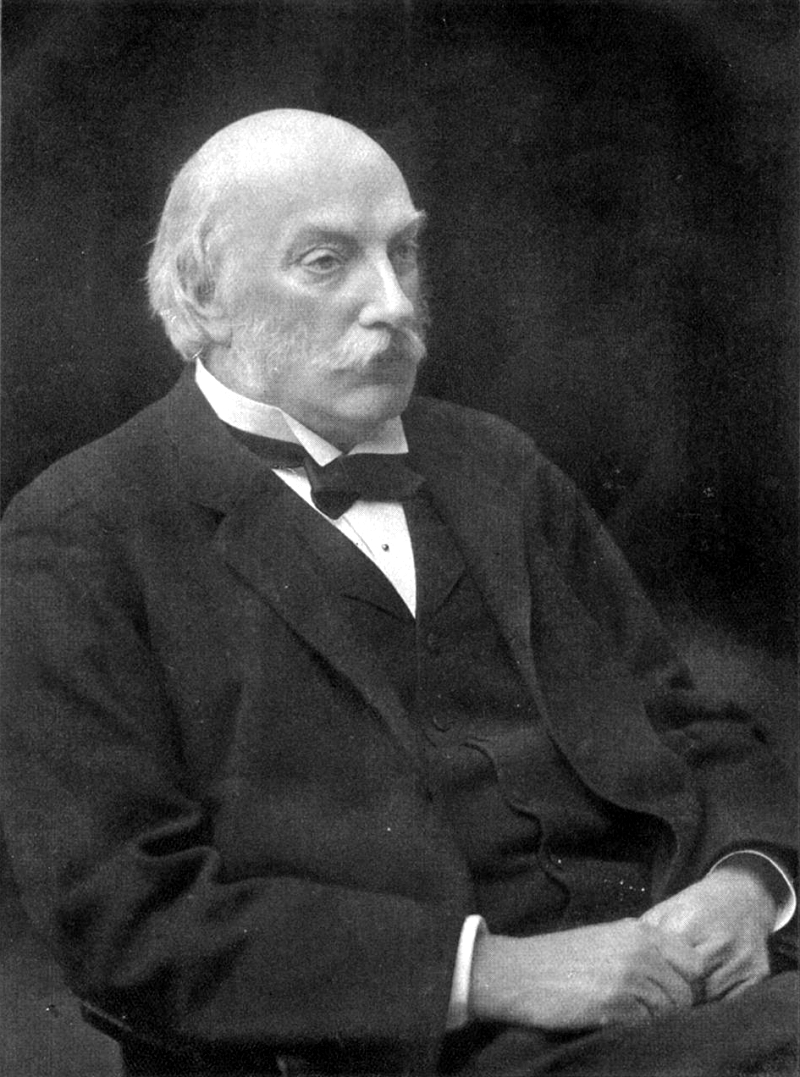
John Strutt, 3rd Baron Rayleigh, Senior Wrangler, 1865.

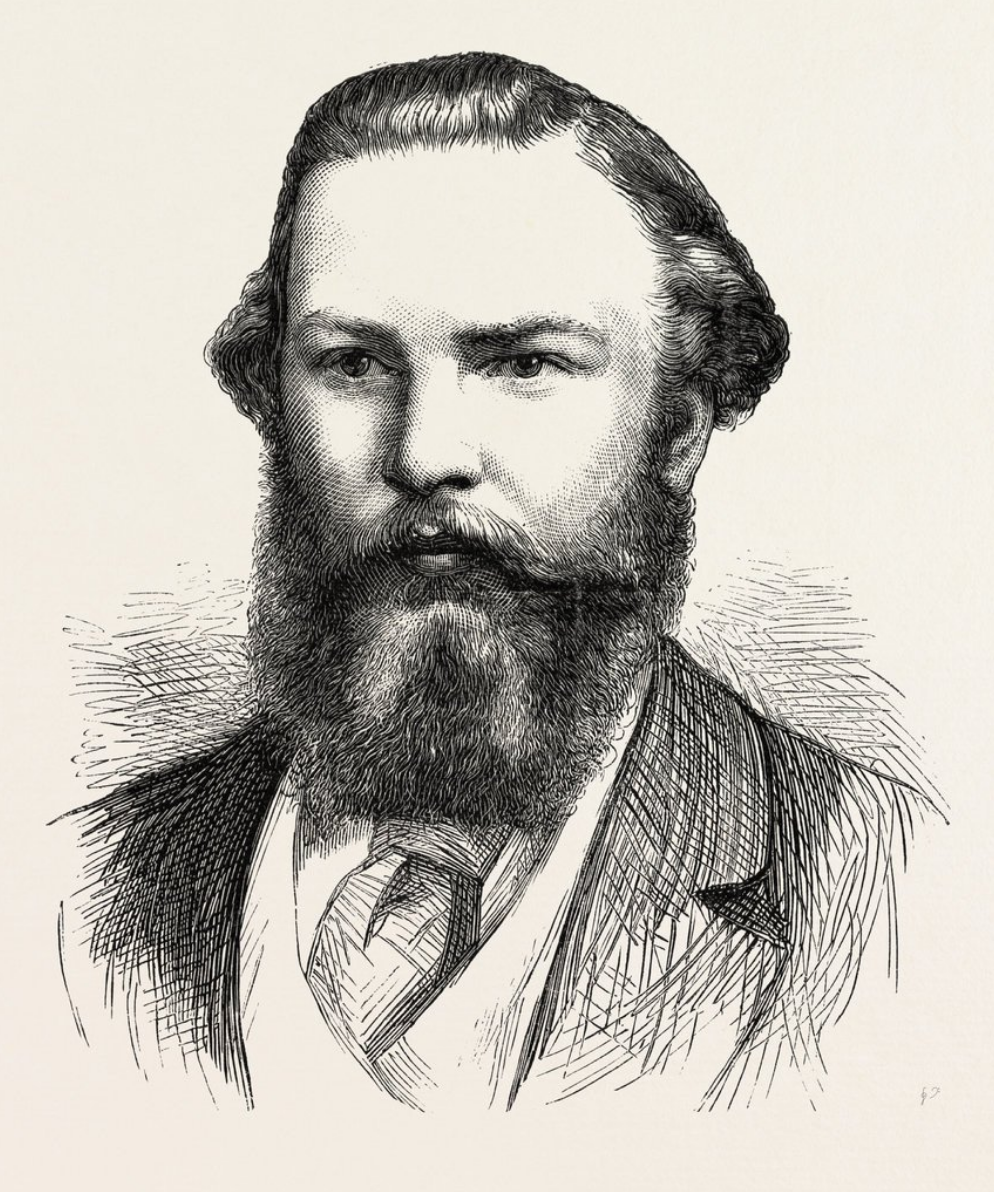
Thomas Oliver Harding, Senior Wrangler, 1863.

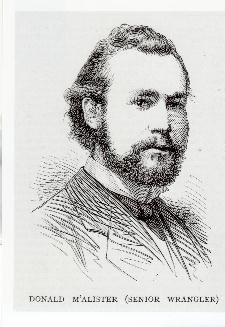
Donald MacAlister, Senior Wrangler, 1877. The postcard portrait is a sign of the fame associated with the position of Senior Wrangler.

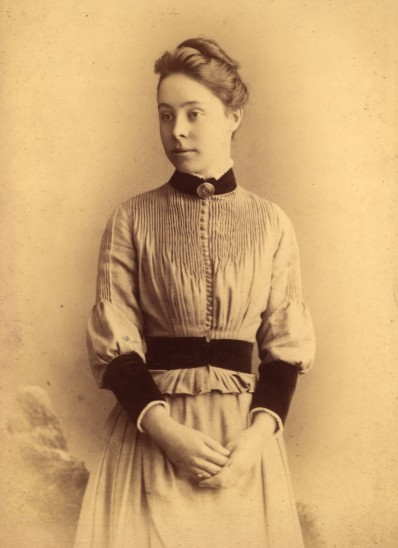
Philippa Fawcett, scored above the Senior Wrangler in 1890.

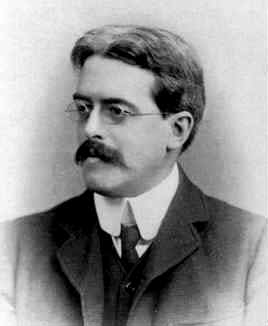
Thomas John I'Anson Bromwich, Senior Wrangler, 1895.

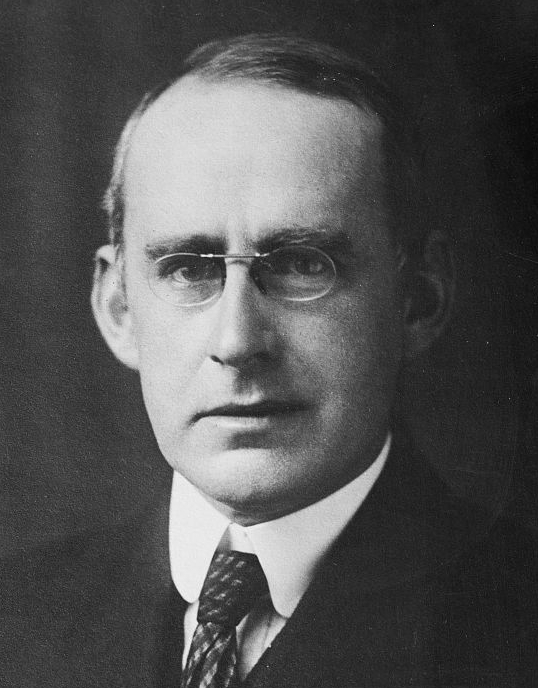
Arthur Eddington, Senior Wrangler, 1904

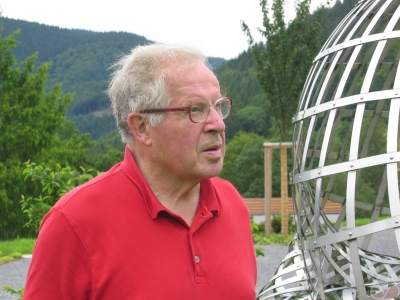
Peter Swinnerton-Dyer, Senior Wrangler in the 1940s

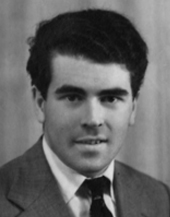
Michael Edward Ash, Senior Wrangler, 1948

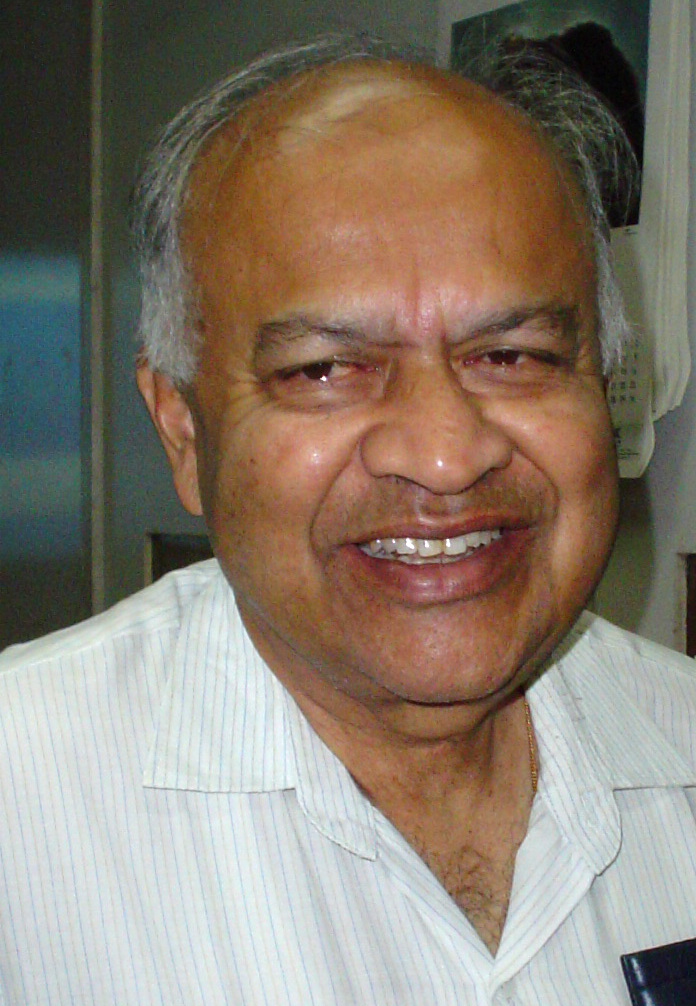
Jayant Narlikar, Senior Wrangler, 1959

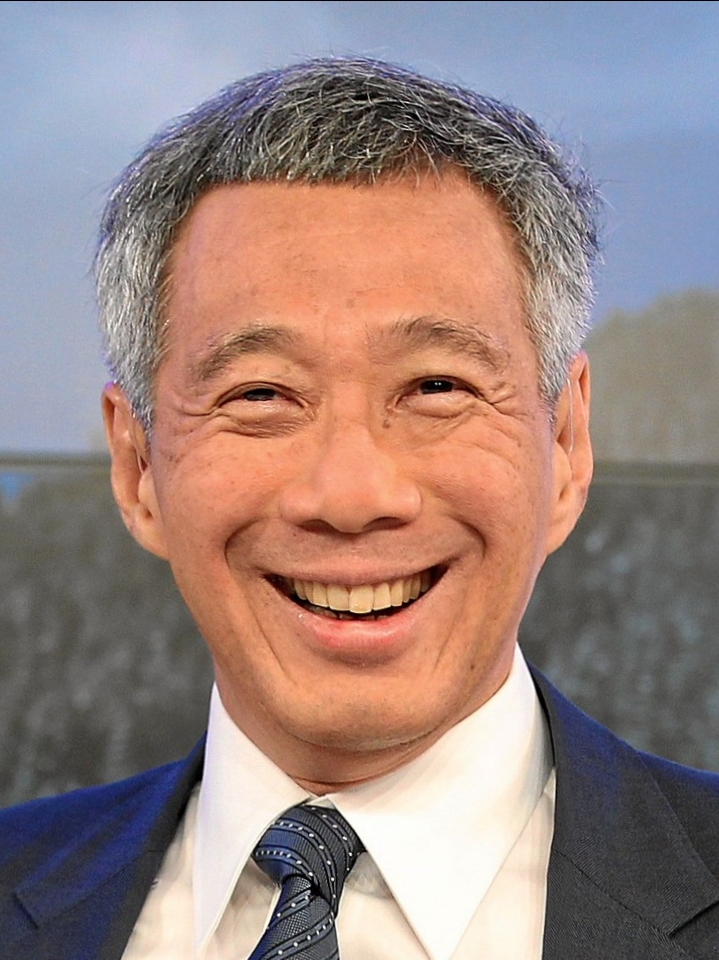
Lee Hsien Loong, Senior Wrangler, 1973

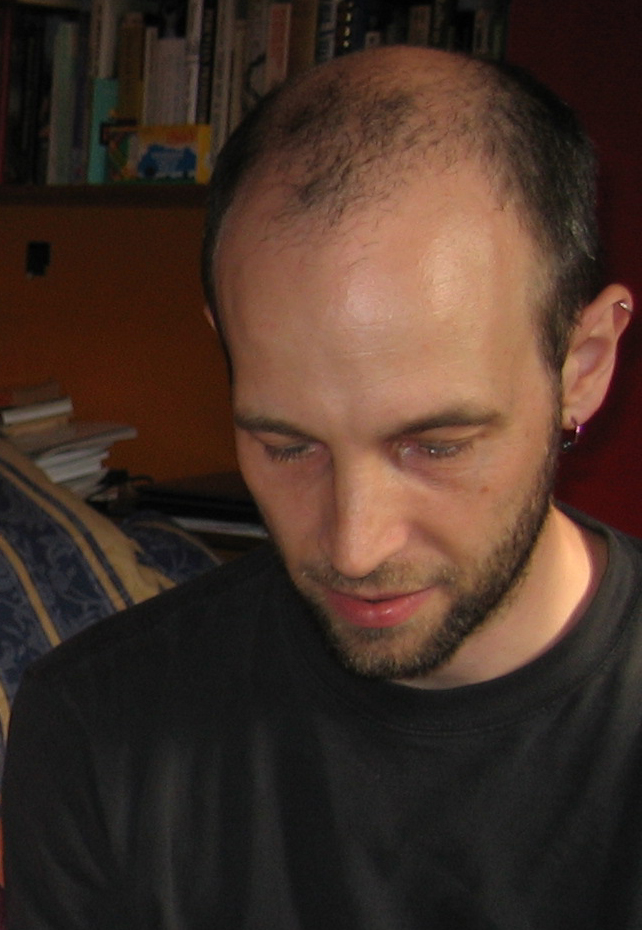
Kevin Buzzard, Senior Wrangler, 1990

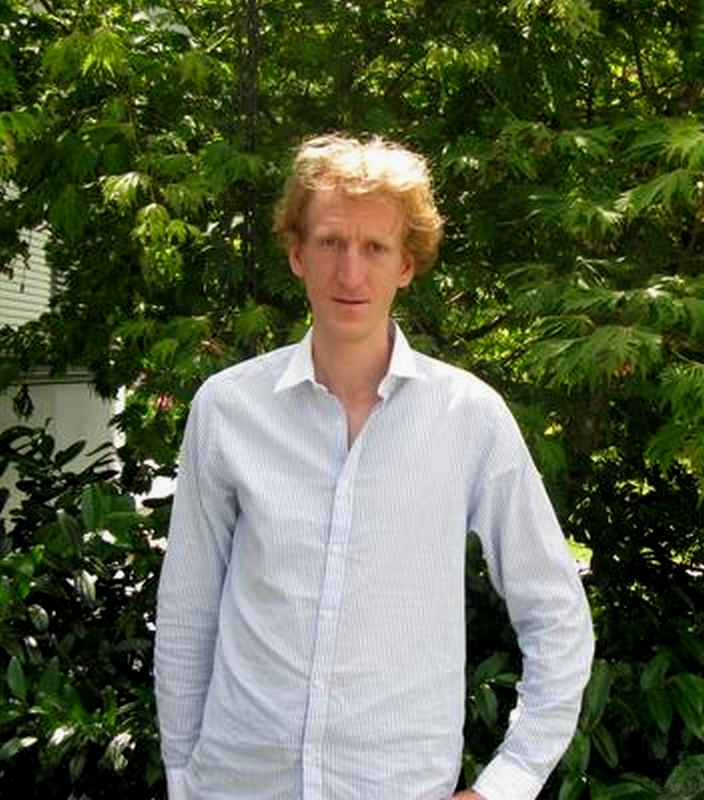
Ben Joseph Green, Senior Wrangler, 1998

Year	Senior Wrangler(s) (Note: In years where there was a tie, individuals tied have been shown as Senior Wrangler, with the next placed candidate(s) as Proxime Accessit; strictly speaking, if n individuals are tied as Senior Wrangler, any runner up is (n+1)-st Wrangler .)	College	Proxime accessit/accesserunt (runner(s) up)	College
1748	John Bates	Gonville and Caius	John Cranwell	Sidney Sussex
1749	John Greene	Corpus Christi	Francis Coventry	Magdalene
1750	William Hazeland	St John's	John Gooch	Gonville and Caius
1751	John Hewthwaite	Christ's	William Cardale	Pembroke
1752	Henry Best	Magdalene	John Cay	Clare
1753	William Disney	Trinity	William Preston	Trinity
1754	William Abbot	St John's	Samuel Hallifax	Jesus
1755	Thomas Castley	Jesus	John Hatsell	Queens'
1756	John Webster	Corpus Christi	William Bearcroft	Peterhouse
1757	Edward Waring	Magdalene	John Jebb	Peterhouse
1758	Robert Thorp	Peterhouse	George Wollaston	Sidney Sussex
1759	Joshua Massey	St John's	Richard Watson	Trinity
1760	George Cross	Clare	Anthony Hamilton	Corpus Christi
1761	John Wilson	Peterhouse	Timothy Lowten	St John's
1762	Richard Haighton	Christ's	Jeremiah Pemberton	Pembroke
1763	William Paley	Christ's	John Frere	Gonville and Caius
1764	Luke Heslop	Corpus Christi	John Fairfax Francklin	Emmanuel
1765	John White	Gonville and Caius	John Clement Ives	Gonville and Caius
1766	William Arnald	St John's	John Law	Christ's
1767	Joseph Turner	Pembroke	George Dutens	Queens'
1768	Thomas Kipling	St John's	George Fielding	Trinity
1769	Thomas Parkinson	Christ's	William Burslem	St John's
1770	Lewis Hughes	St John's	William Smith	St John's
1771	Thomas Starkie	St John's	Roger Kedington	Gonville and Caius
1772	George Pretyman Tomline	Pembroke	Mark Anthony Stephenson	Clare
1773	John Jelland Brundish	Gonville and Caius	George Whitmore	St John's
1774	Isaac Milner	Queens'	George Mounsey	Peterhouse
1775	Samuel Vince	Gonville and Caius	Henry William Coulthurst	St John's
1776	John Oldershaw	Emmanuel	Gilbert Wakefield	Jesus
1777	David Owen	Trinity	Thomas Cautley	Trinity
1778	William Farish	Magdalene	William Taylor	Emmanuel
1779	Thomas Jones	Trinity	Herbert Marsh (Note: Thomas Jones, the Senior Wrangler that year, acted as his tutor.)	St John's
1780	St John Priest	Pembroke	William Frend	Christ's
1781	Henry Ainslie	Pembroke	Montague Farrer Ainslie & George Henry Law	Trinity & Queens'
1782	James Wood	St John's	John Hailstone	Trinity
1783	Francis John Hyde Wollaston	Sidney Sussex	Richard Buck	Magdalene
1784	Robert Acklom Ingram	Queens'	John Holden	Sidney Sussex
1785	William Lax	Trinity	John Dudley	Clare
1786	John Bell	Trinity	Edward Otter	Jesus
1787	Joseph Littledale	St John's	Algernon Frampton	St John's
1788	John Brinkley	Gonville and Caius	Edmund Outram	St John's
1789	William Millers	St John's	Joseph Bewsher	Trinity
1790	Bewick Bridge	Peterhouse	Fletcher Raincock	Pembroke
1791	Daniel Mitford Peacock	Trinity	William Gooch	Gonville and Caius
1792	John Palmer	St John's	George Frederick Tavel	Trinity
1793	Thomas Harrison	Queens'	Thomas Strickland	Trinity
1794	George Butler	Sidney Sussex	John Singleton Copley	Trinity
1795	Robert Woodhouse	Gonville and Caius	William Atthill	Gonville and Caius
1796	John Kempthorne	St John's	William Dealtry	Trinity
1797	John Hudson	Trinity	John Lowthian	Trinity
1798	Thomas Sowerby	Trinity	Robert Martin	Trinity
1799	William Fuller Boteler	St John's	John Brown	Trinity
1800	James Inman	St John's	George D'Oyly	Corpus Christi
1801	Henry Martyn	St John's	William Woodall	Pembroke
1802	Thomas Penny White	Queens'	John Grisdale	Christ's
1803	Thomas Starkie	St John's	Charles James Hoare	St John's
1804	John Kaye	Christ's	William Albin Garratt	Trinity
1805	Thomas Turton	St Catharine's	Samuel Hunter Christie	Trinity
1806	Frederick Pollock	Trinity	Henry Walter	St John's
1807	Henry Gipps	St John's	John Carr	Trinity
1808	Henry Bickersteth	Gonville and Caius	Miles Bland	St John's
1809	Edward Hall Alderson	Gonville and Caius	John Standly	Gonville and Caius
1810	William Henry Maule	Trinity	Thomas Shaw Brandreth	Trinity
1811	Thomas Edward Dicey	Trinity	William French	Caius
1812	Cornelius Neale	St John's	Joseph William Jordan	Trinity
1813	John Herschel	St John's	George Peacock	Trinity
1814	Richard Gwatkin	St John's	Henry Wilkinson	St John's
1815	Charles George Frederick Leicester	Trinity	Frederick Calvert	Jesus
1816	Edward Jacob	Gonville and Caius	William Whewell	Trinity
1817	John Thomas Austen	St John's	Temple Chevallier	Pembroke
1818	John George Shaw-Lefevre	Trinity	John Hind	St John's
1819	Joshua King	Queens'	George Miles Cooper	St John's
1820	Henry Coddington	Trinity	Watkin Maddy	St John's
1821	Solomon Atkinson	Trinity	Henry Melvill	St John's
1822	Hamnett Holditch	Gonville and Caius	Mitford Peacock	Corpus Christi
1823	George Biddell Airy	Trinity	Charles Jeffreys	St John's
1824	John Cowling	St John's	James Bowstead	Corpus Christi
1825	James Challis	Trinity	William Williamson	Clare
1826	William Law	Trinity	John Hymers	St John's
1827	Henry Percy Gordon	Peterhouse	Thomas Turner	Trinity
1828	Charles Perry	Trinity	John Baily	St John's
1829	Henry Philpott	St Catharine's	William Cavendish	Trinity
1830	Charles Thomas Whitley	St John's	James William Lucas Heaviside	Sidney Sussex
1831	Samuel Earnshaw	St John's	Thomas Gaskin	St John's
1832	Douglas Denon Heath	Trinity	Samuel Laing	St John's
1833	Alexander Ellice	Gonville and Caius	Joseph Bowstead	Pembroke
1834	Philip Kelland	Queens'	Thomas Rawson Birks	Trinity
1835	Henry Cotterill	St John's	Henry Goulburn (Note: Also senior classic.)	Trinity
1836	Archibald Smith	Trinity	John William Colenso	St John's
1837	William Nathaniel Griffin	St John's	James Joseph Sylvester	St John's
1838	Thomas John Main	St John's	James George Mould	Corpus Christi
1839	Benjamin Morgan Cowie	St John's	Percival Frost	St John's
1840	Robert Leslie Ellis	Trinity	Harvey Goodwin	Caius
1841	George Gabriel Stokes	Pembroke	Henry Cadman Jones	Trinity
1842	Arthur Cayley	Trinity	Charles Turner Simpson	St John's
1843	John Couch Adams	St John's	Francis Bashforth	St John's
1844	George Wirgman Hemming	St John's	William Bonner Hopkins	Gonville and Caius
1845	Stephen Parkinson	St John's	William Thomson (later known as Lord Kelvin) (Note: According to legend, Kelvin was so confident he had come top that he asked his servant to run to the Senate House and check who the Second Wrangler was. The servant returned and told him, "You, sir!" Kelvin was reportedly beaten largely on the basis of Parkinson's superior exam technique. The result was reversed in the Smith Prize. This story has also been attributed to J.J. Thomson in 1880, and others.)	Peterhouse
1846	Lewis Hensley	Trinity	John Alfred Lumb Airey	Pembroke
1847	William Parkinson Wilson	St John's	Robert Walker	Trinity
1848	Isaac Todhunter	St John's	Charles Mackenzie	Gonville and Caius
1849	Morris Birkbeck Pell	St John's	Henry Carlyon Phear	Gonville and Caius
1850	William Henry Besant	Corpus Christi	Henry William Watson	Trinity
1851	Norman Macleod Ferrers	Gonville and Caius	William Charles Evans	St John's
1852	Peter Guthrie Tait	Peterhouse	William John Steele	Peterhouse
1853	Thomas Bond Sprague	St John's	Robert Braithwaite Batty	Emmanuel
1854	Edward Routh (Note: Routh found more fame subsequently as a coach of other Senior Wranglers. Indeed for twenty-two consecutive years from 1862, one of his pupils was Senior Wrangler, and he coached twenty-seven in all. His first pupil in 1856 was Third Wrangler, and in 1858 both the Senior and Second Wrangler were coached by him.)	Peterhouse	James Clerk Maxwell	Peterhouse & Trinity
1855	James Savage	St John's	Leonard Courtney	St John's
1856	Augustus Vaughton Hadley	St John's	John Rigby	Trinity
1857	Gerard Brown Finch	Queens'	Thomas Savage	Pembroke
1858	George Middleton Slesser	Queens'	Charles Abercrombie Smith	Peterhouse
1859	James Wilson	St John's	Frederick Brown & Anthony William Wilson Steel	Trinity & Gonville and Caius
1860	James Stirling	Trinity	Walter Baily	St John's
1861	William Steadman Aldis	Trinity	John Bond	Magdalene
1862	Thomas Barker	Trinity	John George Laing	St John's
1863	Robert Romer	Trinity Hall	Edward Tucker Leeke	Trinity
1864	Henry John Purkiss	Trinity	William Peverill Turnbull	Trinity
1865	John Strutt (Lord Rayleigh)	Trinity	Alfred Marshall	St John's
1866	Robert Morton	Peterhouse	Thomas Steadman Aldis	Trinity
1867	Charles Niven	Trinity	William Kingdon Clifford	Trinity
1868	John Fletcher Moulton	St John's	George Darwin	Trinity
1869	Numa Edward Hartog (Note: First Jewish Senior Wrangler. A special grace was passed to allow him to be graduated using a special form of the wording to not offend his religious beliefs.)	Trinity	John Eliot	St John's
1870	Richard Pendlebury	St John's	Alfred George Greenhill	St John's
1871	John Hopkinson	Trinity	James Whitbread Lee Glaisher	Trinity
1872	Robert Rumsey Webb	St John's	Horace Lamb	Trinity
1873	Thomas Oliver Harding	Trinity	Edward John Nanson	Trinity
1874	George Constantine Calliphronas	Gonville and Caius	W. W. Rouse Ball	Trinity
1875	John William Lord	Trinity	William Burnside & George Chrystal	Pembroke & Peterhouse
1876	Joseph Timmis Ward	St John's	William Loudon Mollison	Clare
1877	Donald MacAlister	St John's	Frederic Brian De Malbisse Gibbons	Gonville and Caius
1878	E. W. Hobson	Christ's	John Edward Aloysius Steggall	Trinity
1879	Andrew James Campbell Allen	Peterhouse	George Francis Walker	Queens'
1880	Joseph Larmor	St John's	J. J. Thomson	Trinity
1881	Andrew Forsyth (Note: Forsyth was one of the men who were principally responsible for the reform of the Tripos system that led to the end of the Tripos ranking.)	Trinity	Robert Samuel Heath	Trinity
1882	Robert Alfred Herman	Trinity	John Shapland Yeo	St John's
1882 (Note: Regulations were changed to split the class list into Parts I & II, and Part III. The examinations for the former were held in June and retained the ordered class list (in contrast to Part III), so two sets of results exist for this year.)	William Welsh	Jesus	Herbert Hall Turner	Trinity
1883	George Ballard Mathews	St John's	Edward Gurner Gallop	Trinity
1884	William Fleetwood Sheppard	Trinity	Walter Percy Workman	Trinity
1885	Arthur Berry	King's	Augustus Edward Hough Love	St John's
1886	Alfred Cardew Dixon	Trinity	William Charles Fletcher	St John's
1887	H. F. Baker, Sir Alfred William Flux, John Henry Michell & John Cyril Iles	St John's, St John's, Trinity & Trinity	James Bennet Peace	Emmanuel
1888	William McFadden Orr	St John's	William Edwin Brunyate	Trinity
1889	Gilbert Walker	Trinity	Frank Watson Dyson & Percy Cory Gaul	Trinity & Trinity
1890	Geoffrey Thomas Bennett; Philippa Fawcett (Note: Fawcett was the first woman to obtain the top score in the Cambridge Mathematical Tripos exam, but since she could not receive a degree from Cambridge due to being a woman, she could not be the senior wrangler. Cambridge did not offer degrees to women until 1948, and no woman became the Senior Wrangler until Ruth Hendry in 1992..)	St John's (Fawcett: Newnham)	Hugh William Segar	Trinity
1891	James Goodwillie	Corpus Christi	David Beveridge Mair & Robert Hume Davison Mayall	Christ's & Sidney Sussex
1892	Philip Herbert Cowell	Trinity	Francis Robert Sharpe	Christ's
1893	George Thomas Manley	Christ's	Gilbert Harrison John Hurst & Charles Percy Sanger	King's & Trinity
1894	Walter Sibbald Adie & William Fellows Sedgwick	Trinity & Trinity	William Edward Philip	Clare
1895	Thomas John I'Anson Bromwich	St John's	John Hilton Grace & E. T. Whittaker	Peterhouse & Trinity
1896	William Garden Fraser	Queens'	Ernest William Barnes, George Edward St Lawrence Carson & Algernon Charles Legge Wilkinson	Trinity, Trinity & Trinity
1897	William Henry Austin	Trinity	Francis John Welsh Whipple	Trinity
1898	Ronald William Henry Turnbull Hudson	St John's	John Forbes Cameron & James Hopwood Jeans	Gonville and Caius & Trinity
1899	George Birtwhistle & R. P. Paranjpye (Note: First Indian Senior Wrangler.)	Pembroke & St John's	Samuel Bruce McLaren	Trinity
1900	Joseph Edmund Wright	Trinity	Arthur Cyril Webb Aldis	Trinity Hall
1901	Alexander Brown	Gonville and Caius	Herbert Knapman	Emmanuel
1902	Ebenezer Cunningham	St John's	Frank Slator	St John's
1903	Harry Bateman & Philip Edward Marrack	Trinity & Trinity	James Sidney Barnes, Ernest Gold, George Frederic Sowden Hills and Sidney Hill Phillips	Trinity, St John's, Trinity and St John's
1904	Arthur Stanley Eddington (Note: Eddington was the first person to be Senior Wrangler after only two years of study.)	Trinity	G. R. Blanco White	Trinity
1905	John Edensor Littlewood & James Mercer	Trinity & Trinity	H. Smith	Trinity Hall
1906	Arunachala Tyaga Rajan & Clarence John Threlkeld Sewell	Trinity & Trinity	W. J. Harrison	Clare
1907	G. N. Watson	Trinity	Herbert Western Turnbull	Trinity
1908	Selig Brodetsky & A. W. Ibbotson	Trinity & Pembroke	H. Minson	Christ's
1909	Percy John Daniell	Trinity	E. H. Neville	Trinity

== Senior Wranglers since 1910 ==
Year	Senior Wrangler	College
1912	Bhupati Mohan Sen	King's
1914	Brian Charles Molony	Trinity
1915	Francis Puryer White	St. John's
1923	Frank Ramsey	Trinity
1928	Donald Coxeter	Trinity
1930	Jacob Bronowski	Jesus
1934	David Scott Dunbar	Clare
1939	James Wilkinson	Trinity
1940	Hermann Bondi	Trinity
1944	Denis Sargan	St John's
1945	John Shepherdson	Trinity
1948	Michael Edward Ash	Trinity
1952	John Polkinghorne	Trinity
1953	Crispin Nash-Williams	Trinity Hall
1959	Jayant Narlikar	Non-collegiate
1964	Geoffrey Fox	Trinity
1966	Nigel Kalton	Trinity
1967	Colin Myerscough	Churchill
1970	Derek Wanless	King's
1972	Gordon Woo	Christ's
1973	Lee Hsien Loong	Trinity
1975	Peter J. Young	St John's
1977	Glyn Moody	Trinity
1981	Mike Giles	Churchill
1982	Christopher Budd	St John's
1983	John Lister	Trinity
1985	Nick Mee	Trinity
1988	Andrew Peter Weir	Trinity
1990	Kevin Buzzard	Trinity
1991	Nicholas Barberis	Jesus
1992	Ruth Hendry	Queens'
1993	Ian Dowker	Trinity
1994	Wee Teck Gan	Churchill
1995	Balazs Szendroi	Trinity
1996	David W. Essex	Trinity
1997	Alexander G. Barnard	Trinity
1998	Ben Joseph Green	Trinity
1999	Paul Russell	Peterhouse
2000	Toby Gee	Trinity
2001	Mohan Ganesalingam	Trinity
2002	Jeremy Young	Trinity
2003	Thomas Barnet-Lamb	Trinity
2004	David Loeffler	Trinity
2005	Tim Austin	Trinity
2006	Antonio Lei	Trinity
2007	Paul Jefferys	Trinity
2008	Le Hung Viet Bao	Trinity
2009	Thomas Beck	Trinity Hall
2010	Zihan Hans Liu	Trinity
2011	Sean Eberhard	Gonville and Caius
2012	Sean Moss	Trinity
2013	Arran Fernandez	Fitzwilliam
2014	Yang Li	Downing
2015	Timothy Large	Trinity
2016	Leo Lai	Churchill
2017	Jonathan Zheng	Trinity
2018	Barnabas Janzer	Trinity
2019	Warren Li	Trinity
2020	Exam cancelled due to COVID-19 outbreak	N/A
2021	Alejandro Epelde Blanco	Trinity
2022	Gheehyun Nahm	Trinity
2023	Ruby Khondaker	Trinity
2024	Timur Pryadilin	St John's
2025	Fredy Yip	Trinity
2026	Eaton Liu	Magdalene

Senior Wranglers since 1910 also include:

- David Hobson (Christ's College) (1940s)
- Peter Swinnerton-Dyer (Trinity College) (1940s)
- Jack Leeming (St John's College)
- Michael Hall (Trinity College) (1950s)

== See also ==
- Wooden spoon (award)

== Bibliography ==
- Galton, Francis (2000). "Classification of Men According to their Natural Gifts". In James Roy Newman (ed.). The World of Mathematics. Vol. 2. Courier Dover Publications. ISBN 0-486-41150-8.
- ed. H.C.G Matthew and Brian Harrison, ed. (2004). Oxford Dictionary of National Biography. Oxford University Press.
- Tanner, Joseph Robson (1917). The historical register of the University of Cambridge, being a supplement to the Calendar with a record of University offices, honours and distinctions to the year 1910 (PDF). Cambridge University Press.
- Venn, John (1922–27). Alumni Cantabrigienses. Cambridge University Press.
- Paul, Margaret (2012). Frank Ramsey (1903–1930): A Sister's Memoir. Smith-Gordon.
