= Thomas Barker (mathematician) =

Scottish mathematician

Thomas Barker (9 September 1838 – 20 November 1907) was a Scottish mathematician, professor of pure mathematics at Owens College.

== Life ==
Born 9 September 1838, he was son of Thomas Barker, farmer, of Murcar, Balgonie, near Aberdeen, and of his wife Margaret. Three other children died in infancy. He was educated at Aberdeen Grammar School, and at King's College in the same town, where he graduated in 1857 with distinction in mathematics.

Barker entered Trinity College, Cambridge as minor scholar and subsizar in 1858. He became foundation scholar in 1860, Sheepshanks astronomical exhibitioner in 1861, and came out in the Mathematical Tripos of 1862 as senior wrangler; he was also first Smith's prizeman. He was elected to a fellowship in the autumn of 1862, and was assistant tutor of Trinity till 1865, when he was appointed professor of pure mathematics in Owens College, Manchester. He held this post for twenty years.

Barker was a follower of Augustus De Morgan and George Boole. He was interested in the logical basis rather than in the applications of mathematics, and was an austere teacher. He disliked publication.

After resigning his chair in 1885, Barker lived in retirement, first at Whaley Bridge and then at Buxton. He pursued the study of cryptogamic botany. He died unmarried at Buxton on 20 November 1907, and was buried in Southern Cemetery, Manchester.

== Pupils ==
Barker had a number of distinguished mathematicians and physicists as pupils: they included John Walton Capstick, John Hopkinson, John Henry Poynting, Arthur Schuster, and Joseph John Thomson.

== Legacy ==
By his will Barker provided for the foundation in the University of Manchester of a professorship of cryptogamic botany, and for the endowment of bursaries in mathematics and botany.

== Notes ==
Attribution

This article incorporates text from a publication now in the public domain: Lee, Sidney, ed. (1912). "Barker, Thomas". Dictionary of National Biography (2nd supplement). Vol. 1. London: Smith, Elder & Co.
