= Mary Rickett =

British mathematician (1861–1925)

Mary Ellen Rickett
- Born: March 4, 1861
- Died: March 20, 1925 (aged 64)
- Education: Bedford College, London; Newnham College, University of Cambridge
- Occupation: Mathematician
- Known for: First Wrangler of Newnham

Mary Ellen Rickett (4 March 1861 – 20 March 1925) was a British mathematician who lectured in mathematics at Newnham College, University of Cambridge for more than twenty years. She was also the Vice-Principal of Old Hall from 1895 until her death in 1925. She was the first woman to win Bedford College's Gold Medal when she graduated with her bachelor's degree, and the first Wrangler of Newnham College.

== Life ==
Rickett was born on 4 March 1861. She was educated by private tutors, and then at a private school in Brighton, and at Priory School in Dover. Rickett earned a bachelor's degree in French and German from Bedford College, London, part of the University of London, in 1881, and was the first woman to win the gold medal of the University of London.

She studied at Newnham College beginning in 1882, and took both the Classical Tripos in 1884 and the Mathematical Tripos in 1885 and 1886. In the Mathematical Tripos, her score was next after the 24th Wrangler (and before the 25th Wrangler), making her the first Wrangler of Newnham. In 1893, she was elected one of the first thirty associates of the college.

She became a lecturer in mathematics at Newnham College in 1886, associate of the college in 1893, acting vice-principal of Old Hall in 1889, and permanent vice-principal in 1895. Rickett was regarded as an "especially successful teacher", whose approach was "precise and clear". In Newnham, she coached Philippa Fawcett to become the first woman to get the highest score on the Mathematical Tripos, 1890. Rickett retired in 1908, and died on 20 March 1925, aged 64.
