= R. W. H. T. Hudson =

British mathematician

- Ronald William Henry Turnbull Hudson
- Born: 16 July 1876; Cambridge, England
- Died: 20 September 1904 (aged 28); Devil's Kitchen, Twll Du Snowdonia, Wales
- Education: University of Cambridge; University of London
- Awards: Smith's Prize (1900)
- Scientific career
- Fields: Mathematician
- Workplaces: University of Liverpool

Ronald William Henry Turnbull Hudson (16 July 1876 – 20 September 1904) was a British mathematician.

Hudson was born into a family of mathematical talents. He was the oldest of four children of William Henry Hoar Hudson, Professor of Mathematics at King's College London, and his mother read mathematics at Newnham College, Cambridge. Both of his sisters became mathematicians.

Hudson read mathematics in St John's College, Cambridge, beginning in 1895, and became senior wrangler in 1898. In the same year he was elected as a Fellow of St John's. He moved to University College, Liverpool as a lecturer in 1902, and defended a doctorate (D.Sc.) at the University of London in 1903.

In 1904, Hudson died in a mountaineering accident in Snowdonia at the age of 28.

In 1905, his posthumously-published book Kummer's Quartic Surface has gone on to become one of the most foundational texts in geometry.

== Publications ==
- Hudson, R. W. H. T. (1905), Kummer's Quartic Surface, Cambridge University Press. Reprinted as part of the Cambridge Mathematics Library with an added foreword by R. Barth, 1990, ISBN 0-521-39790-1, MR 1097176.
