= George Wirgman Hemming =

English law reporter and barrister

George Wirgman Hemming, KC (1821–1905) was an English law reporter and barrister.

== Life ==
Born on 19 August 1821, he was the second son of Henry Keene Hemming of Grays, Essex, by his wife Sophia, daughter of Gabriel Wirgman of London. Educated at Clapham grammar school, he went to St John's College, Cambridge, where in 1844, he was senior wrangler and first Smith's prizeman and was elected to a fellowship.

Hemming entered Lincoln's Inn in 1844 but was not called to the bar until 3 May 1850, meanwhile continuing mathematical studies. His work as a reporter in the chancery courts began in 1859 and continued without a break until 1894. From 1871 to 1875, when he took silk, he was junior counsel to the treasury—generally a stepping-stone to the bench. From 1875 to 1879, he was standing counsel to his university and was appointed a commissioner under the Universities of Oxford and Cambridge Act 1877 (40 & 41 Vict. c. 48). As a Q.C., he practised before Vice-chancellor James Bacon and, in 1887, was appointed an official referee. Elected a bencher in 1876, he 1897 served as treasurer of Lincoln's Inn.

Hemming died at 2 Earl's Court Square, South Kensington, on 6 January 1905 and was buried in old Hampstead church.

== Works ==
Hemming wrote An Elementary Treatise on the Differential and Integral Calculus (Cambridge, 1848; 2nd edit. 1852); First Book on Plane Trigonometry (1851); and Billiards Mathematically Treated (1899; 2nd edit. 1904). He published Reports of Cases adjudged in the High Court of Chancery before Sir William Page Wood for 1859–62 (2 vols. 1861–3, with Henry Robert Vaughan Johnson); and for 1862–65 (2 vols. 1864–5, with Alexander Edward Miller). On establishing the Council of Law reporting, Hemming acted as an editor of the Equity Cases and Chancery Appeals, subsequently merged in the chancery division series of the Law Reports. He was a regular contributor to the Saturday Review from which a pamphlet on the Fusion of Law and Equity was reprinted in 1873.

== Family ==
Hemming married in 1855 his second cousin Louisa Annie, daughter of Samuel Hemming of Merrywood Hall, Bristol, and had four sons and four daughters. The eldest son, Harry Baird (b. 1856), was law reporter to the House of Lords; a daughter, Fanny Henrietta (1863–1886), exhibited at the Royal Academy.

== Notes ==
Attribution

This article incorporates text from a publication now in the public domain: Lee, Sidney, ed. (1912). "Hemming, George Wirgman". Dictionary of National Biography (2nd supplement). Vol. 12. London: Smith, Elder & Co.
