= Robert Rumsey Webb =

Mathematics coach for Tripos at Cambridge

Robert Rumsey Webb (9 July 1850 – 29 July 1936), known as R. R. Webb, was a successful coach for the Cambridge Mathematical Tripos. Webb coached 100 students to place in the top ten wranglers from 1865 to 1909, a record second only to Edward Routh.

== Biography ==
Webb was born on 9 July 1850 in Monmouth. He was the son of Thomas Webb (born 1812) and Hannah Edwards. He graduated from the Monmouth Grammar School and entered St John's College, Cambridge in 1868. Webb was Senior Wrangler and Smith's Prize winner in 1872, when he obtained a Fellowship to St John's College.

Webb was lecturer at both St John's (1877 to 1911) and Emmanuel College (1878 to 1893). He produced memorable lectures on the theory of elasticity. Students recalled that "jokes were repeated", seasoning his lectures with "attic salt", though they "retained their freshness". Webb became a Fellow of the Royal Astronomical Society on 18 November 1879.

As senior wrangler himself, Webb attracted students with similar aspirations. "He succeeded Dr. Routh as the most brilliant, and most successful, mathematical coach of his day." When Andrew Warwick reviewed the record for his book Masters of Theory, his tally of top ten wranglers placed Webb second. Though the Tripos results were prominent news at the time, Webb's "real memorial lies in the careers of his pupils." When A. R. Forsyth recalled his experience preparing for Tripos, he wrote of Webb:

Much junior in standing, a superb teacher, a man (I believe) whose powers would have taken him far as a pioneer into the domain of new knowledge had they been devoted to research rather than coaching.

Forsyth also found that Routh was not the ideal teacher of rigid dynamics:

In that subject I went to a course at St. John’s by R.R. Webb, a master in its range: and his course was superb.

Webb "was fond of travel, and interested in painting and music. During the latter part of his life he went in for linguistic studies over a wide range." Webb died in Cambridge on 29 July 1936. His papers, containing notes for coaching students, are stored at St John's College Library. A mathematical scholarship in Robert Webb's name was maintained by the William Jones Schools Foundation.

== Papers ==
R. R. Webb published the following articles in the Messenger of Mathematics:

- 1879: volume 9, pages 6 to 9: "On a certain system of simultaneous differential equations"
- 1879: volume 9, page 124: "On an elementary integral"
- 1879: volume 9, pages 125,6; "On Legendre's coefficients"
- 1879: volume 9, pages 151 to 158: "The brachistochrone problem of a system"
- 1879: volume 9, pages 170 to 178: "Some applications of a theorem in solid geometry"
- 1880: volume 10, pages 150 to 156: "On a theorem in statics"
- 1881: volume 11, pages 146 to 155: "Stress and strain in cylindrical and polar coordinates"
- 1881: volume 11, pages 150 to 156: "On the equilibrium of a bent plate"
