= Thomas Oliver Harding =

Senior Wrangler at Cambridge; schoolmaster

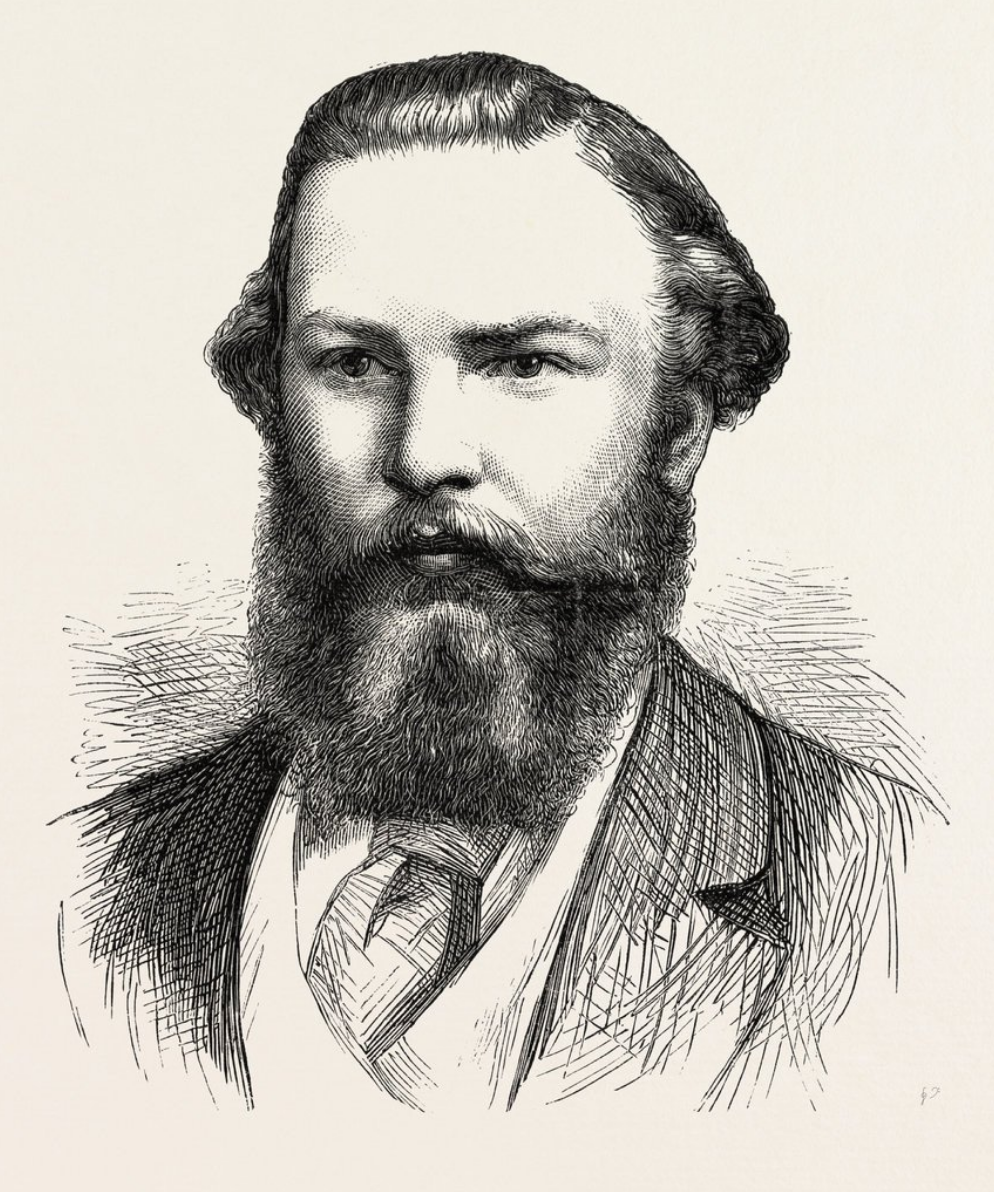
- As Senior Wrangler, 1873
- Born: 5 January 1850; Watford, England
- Died: 17 October 1896 (aged 46)
- Known for: Senior Wrangler at Cambridge University

Thomas Oliver Harding (5 January 1850 – 17 October 1896) was Senior Wrangler at Cambridge University in 1873.

Harding was the son of the Reverend Thomas Harding, a Wesleyan minister, of Whitehaven. He received his early education at Kingswood Wesleyan School near Bath, followed by studies at King's College, London, and then at Trinity College, Cambridge where he took the Mathematical Tripos. The College awarded him the senior mathematical minor scholarship, and elected him to a foundation scholarship in 1871. He was a first-class prizeman in 1870, 1871 and 1872, graduating as Senior Wrangler in 1873 and receiving his MA in 1876.

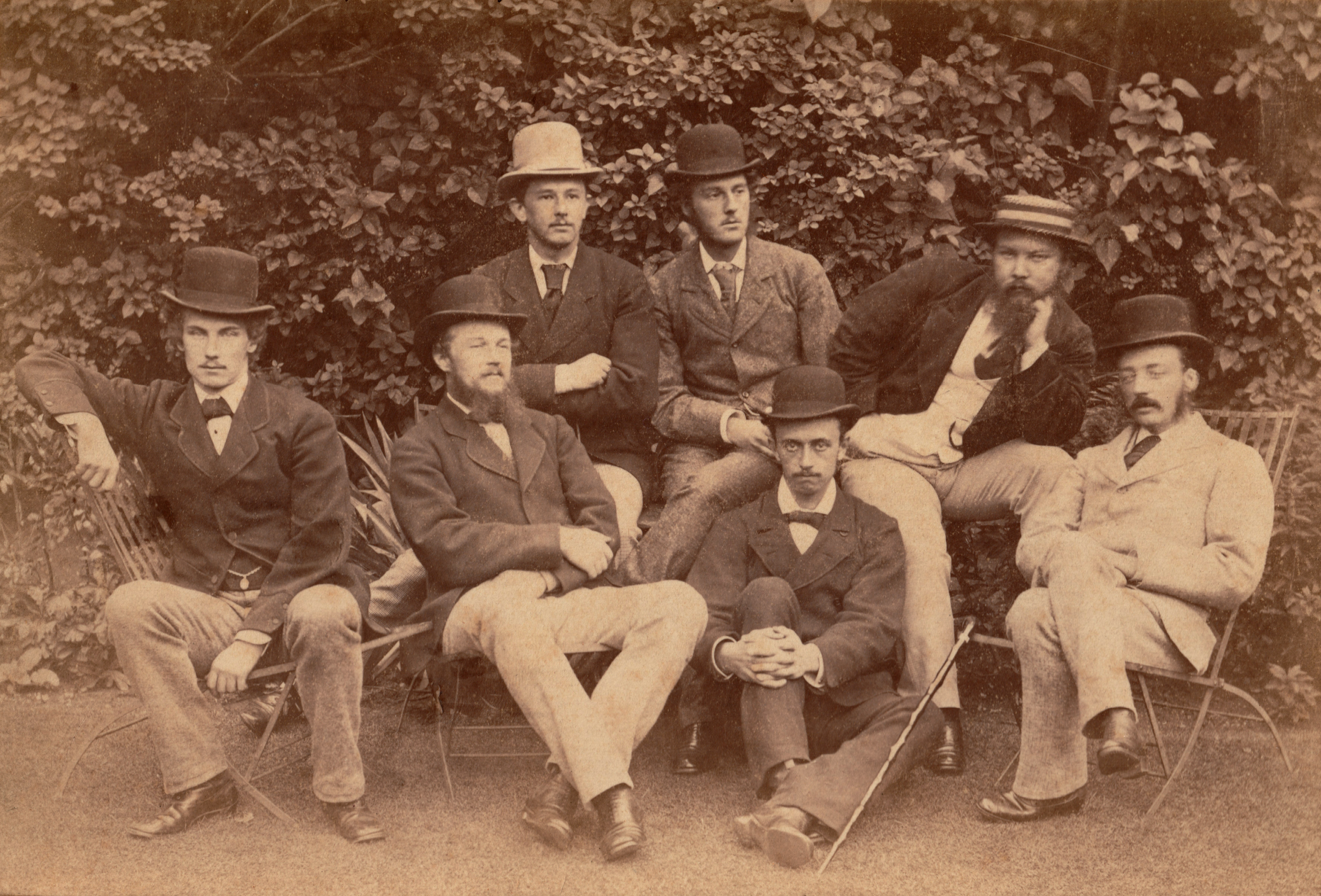
Harding (right of back row) in 1873, the year he became Senior Wrangler; Shakespeare Society, Trinity College, Cambridge

Harding was elected to the Cambridge Apostles in 1872, and as an undergraduate was a keen oarsman and swimmer. He was also elected President of the Cambridge Union. After graduation he became a schoolmaster at Marlborough College, and (according to one source) a barrister.

He died in 1896.
