= William Edward Hodgson Berwick =

British mathematician (1888–1944)

W.E.H. Berwick
- Born: 11 March 1888; Bradford, England
- Died: 13 May 1944 (aged 56); Bangor, Gwynedd, Wales
- Occupation: Mathematician
- Awards: Smith's Prize (1910)

William Edward Hodgson Berwick (11 March 1888 in Dudley Hill, Bradford – 13 May 1944 in Bangor, Gwynedd) was a British mathematician, specializing in algebra, who worked on the problem of computing an integral basis for the algebraic integers in a simple algebraic extension of the rationals.

== Academic career ==
Berwick was educated at a small private school before entering Bradford Grammar School. He completed his schooling in 1906, securing a Brown Scholarship to assist him in his university studies; he was also awarded an Entrance Scholarship by Clare College, Cambridge, where he went to study the Mathematical Tripos. He took Part I of the degree in 1909, placing joint fourth in the class, and Part II in 1910.

During his undergraduate years, under the tutelage of G. B. Mathews, Berwick became interested in number theory. He submitted an essay entitled An illustration of the theory of relative corpora for the Smith's Prize in 1911; the essay was placed second in the prize competition. He then co-wrote, with Matthews, a paper On the reduction of arithmetical binary cubics which have a negative determinant: it was published after Berwick had left Cambridge to take up an assistant lectureship at the University of Bristol, and was the only paper Berwick co-authored in his career.

Berwick taught at Bristol until 1913 when he took up another lectureship at the University College of Bangor. With the outbreak of the First World War in 1914 Berwick began war work on the Technical Staff of the Anti-Aircraft Experimental Section of the Munitions Inventions Department at Portsmouth. For the 1919–20 academic year Berwick was appointed acting head of the Bangor mathematics department; he then took up a lectureship at the University of Leeds, earning promotion to a Readership in Mathematical Analysis there in 1921. He was also elected to a fellowship at Clare College, Cambridge, in 1921.

In 1926, with thirteen research papers to his name, Berwick returned to Bangor to serve as Chairman of Mathematics. He had in 1925 become a member of the Council of the London Mathematical Society; in 1929 he was appointed Vice-President. He retired the post in 1941, at which point he was created Emeritus Professor.

== Research and publications ==
Berwick was an algebraist, and worked on the problem of computing an integral basis for the algebraic integers in a simple algebraic extension of the rationals, and studied rings in algebraic integers. In 1927 he published Integral Bases, an ambitious account that used heavy numerical computations in place of practical proofs. It was reprinted in 1964.

He published sixteen papers, ten of them — including a 1915 paper giving sufficient conditions for a quintic expression to be solved by radicals — in Proceedings of the London Mathematical Society.

== Personal life ==
Berwick was described as a tall man with a distinctive voice and forthright personal style. He was a keen chess player, participating in the clubs at his various universities. He had a keen interest in teaching, publishing a number of mathematical recreation articles and giving several addresses at meetings of the British Association.

In 1923, while living in Leeds, Berwick married Daisy May Thomas, the daughter of Dr W R Thomas. His health began to fail after his 1926 return to Bangor; he published only five further papers after taking up this position. He died in Bangor in 1944.

== Legacy ==
Berwick endowed funds for two prizes to the London Mathematical Society; after his death they were used to create the Senior Berwick prize and Junior Berwick prize, both of which are still awarded.
