= Stephen Parkinson =

Stephen Parkinson may refer to:

- Stephen Parkinson (mathematician) (1823–1889), British mathematician and academic
- Stephen Parkinson (lawyer) (born 1957), English barrister, solicitor, and head of the Crown Prosecution Service
- Stephen Parkinson, Baron Parkinson of Whitley Bay (born 1983), British Conservative member of the House of Lords and former lobbyist
