= Arran Fernandez =

British mathematician (born 1995)

- Born: 14 June 1995 (age 31); Glasgow, United Kingdom
- Education: Home-educated; University of Cambridge (BA, MMath, PhD)
- Scientific career
- Fields: Fractional calculus
- Workplaces: Eastern Mediterranean University
- Thesis: Analysis in Fractional Calculus and Asymptotics Related to Zeta Functions (2018)
- Doctoral advisor: Athanassios S. Fokas

Arran Fernandez (born June 1995) is a British mathematician, an associate professor at the Eastern Mediterranean University, and a researcher in fractional calculus. After setting various age records for British academic qualifications, starting as a young child, he became Senior Wrangler at Cambridge University at the youngest age ever - 18 years and 6 days. (Note: The previous youngest was probably James Wilkinson in 1939, aged 19 years, 9 months. Up to 1909, the youngest was Peter Guthrie Tait in 1862, aged 20 years, 8 months.)

== Early life and education ==
Starting in 2000 (aged five), Fernandez had several sequences published in the On-Line Encyclopedia of Integer Sequences (OEIS), the number theory database established by Neil Sloane.

Prior to university, Fernandez was educated at home, predominantly by his father, the radical educationalist Neil Fernandez. In 2001, he broke the age record for gaining a General Certificate of Secondary Education (GCSE), the English academic qualification usually taken at age 16, for which he sat the examinations aged five. In 2003, he became the youngest person ever to gain an A* grade at GCSE, also for Mathematics.

In 2001, Fernandez appeared as a "Person of the Week" on Frank Elstner's talk show on German TV. In 2003, he appeared on Terry Wogan's and Gaby Roslin's The Terry and Gaby Show on British TV, when he beat mathematics populariser Johnny Ball in a live mental arithmetic contest, successfully extracting the fifth roots of several large integers.

Fernandez believes it was his exceptional environment, rather than exceptional nature, that enabled him to achieve his academic successes. "Everything I achieved is because of my education and the opportunities I had. And the big part of my story is that I never went to school. My parents never believed in the official education system." In a 2020 interview with Raidio Teilifis Eireann, he stated his opinion that a large number of people could achieve at the same level if they had the same opportunities as he did, and that those opportunities "would have to start at a very young age", such as at two years old.

In October 2010, when Fernandez began studying the Cambridge Mathematical Tripos aged 15 years and 3 months, he was the youngest University of Cambridge undergraduate since William Pitt the Younger in 1773. In June 2013, he became that year's Senior Wrangler.

== Academic career ==
In September 2018, having completed master's and doctoral degrees at the University of Cambridge, Fernandez joined the faculty of the Eastern Mediterranean University in Northern Cyprus as an assistant professor of mathematics, where in 2022 he became an associate professor. He also spent one academic year at Sultan Qaboos University in Oman, also as an associate professor of mathematics.

Since 2017, he has published several articles in peer-reviewed international journals each year. He is also an associate editor in some mathematical journals, including the journal of Fractional Calculus and Applied Analysis.

His main research area is fractional calculus, and much of his research involves connecting this field with other branches of mathematics, such as abstract algebra, analytic number theory, and Clifford analysis. His research accomplishments include applying Mikusiński’s operational calculus to fractional PDEs, expressing the Riemann zeta function in terms of fractional operators applied to elementary functions, and defining fractional Wirtinger derivatives.
