= Robert Alfred Herman =

English mathematician at Cambridge (1861 to 1927)

Robert Alfred Herman (1861–1927) was a fellow of Trinity College, Cambridge, who coached many students to a high wrangler rank in the Cambridge Mathematical Tripos. Herman was senior wrangler in 1882.

== Coaching and Tripos rankings ==
In the early days of Tripos, coaches were in private business in rooms off-campus. In the 1880s and 1890s instruction at college improved to the point that coaches merely supervised their students’ progress. Under these conditions the tradition of private coaching fell away, and fellows such as Herman coached students.

In 1895 C. Godfrey, who counted Herman as coach, ranked fourth wrangler, and in 1897 when P. H. Ezechiel also came in fourth. In 1898 Herman coached A. H. Pocck who came eighth and C. S. Lloyd who came tenth. In 1899 his students included seventh, ninth, and tenth wranglers. In 1900 senior wrangler J. E. Wright was his student, and his textbook A Treatise on Geometrical Optics was published.

In 1903 Harry Bateman was senior, P. E. Marrak second, and G. F. S. Hills fifth under Herman’s coaching. Arthur Eddington was senior wrangler in 1904, and Herman had four other students in the ranks of the top ten wranglers. J. E. Littlewood (1905) and Arunachala Tyaga Rajan (1906) were senior wranglers, E. H. Neville came second in 1909, and many other students of Herman made it into the top ranks of wranglers before the ranking was abolished.

== Subjects taught and notable students ==
Each year Herman gave a course in differential geometry. His students James Jeans, Harry Bateman, and Arthur Eddington, among others, later proved their facility with methods of differential geometry as they developed the theories of electromagnetism and relativity of spacetime.

== Legacy and personal life ==
Andrew Forsyth reviewed the history of Tripos, and wrote, "my old friend, R. A. Herman, who died a few years ago, a man of unusual manipulative skill, a great and stimulating teacher, the last of the great coaches." Herman married in 1888 and died in 1927.
