= Sarah Woodhead =

English teacher & school principal

Sarah Woodhead (1851–1912) was the first woman to take and pass a Tripos examination. In particular, she was the first woman to take, and to pass, the Mathematical Tripos exam, which she did in 1873.

== Education ==
Woodhead’s family had long belonged to the Society of Friends, so she was able to attend Ackworth School, a Quaker school that accepted daughters of Friends as well as their sons.

Woodhead later studied at Girton College, the first women's college to be founded at Oxford or Cambridge. As the physical college had yet to be built, she attended courses set up by Girton founder Emily Davies at Benslow House, Hitchin. In 1873, Woodhead took the same Mathematical Tripos examination as the male students, having already gained a first at Part I, and was classed equivalent to Senior Optime in mathematics. She was the first woman to take, and to pass, the Mathematical Tripos exam. This also made her the very first of the first three women to complete any Tripos at Girton College. The three "honorary" (rather than actual) graduates became known as "Woodhead, Cook and Lumsden, the Girton Pioneers".

== Later life and death ==
Woodhead married architect Christopher Corbett, after which she ran her own school in Bolton. She then became the second headmistress of Bolton School, known then as Bolton High School for Girls. After her husband moved the family back to Manchester to take over his family firm, she found employment as an inspector of schools.

Widowed in her fifties, she moved to Harrogate and died there in July, 1908, aged fifty-seven.

== See also ==
- Philippa Fawcett, the first woman to obtain the top score on the Mathematical Tripos.
