= Andrew James Campbell Allen =

Andrew James Campbell Allen (born 9 February 1856 in Belfast, died 16 November 1923 at Grove Park railway station) was a Northern Irish mathematician and educational administrator whose career was spent in England and whose last three decades were spent as an Anglican clergyman. Campbell Allen was one of only four Irish students to achieve Senior Wrangler status in the Cambridge mathematical tripos.

He was the son of William John Campbell Allen (whose wealth derived from railways and banking) and Isabella Marshall.

The younger Campbell Allen attended school at the Royal Belfast Academical Institution and earned mathematics degrees from Queen's College, Belfast (BA and MA, in 1875 and 1877, respectively). He then matriculated at Peterhouse in Cambridge, and in 1879 became Senior Wrangler at the mathematical tripos. The only other Irishmen to achieve that distinction were Stokes, Larmor and William M. Orr.

He was a Fellow and Tutor at Peterhouse (1879–84), and Principal of Chester Training College (1886–90), where he tried (with mixed success) to usher in a new era of liberalisation and modernisation. He finally resigned out of frustration with the governors. Having taken holy orders in 1880, in 1892 Campbell Allen was appointed Vicar of St Mary the Less, Cambridge. He also later served as Rural Dean of Cambridge.

Campbell Allen authored several religious books and also published numerous papers on trigonometry, geometry, optics and electricity. Some sources list Campbell Allen as having the last name "Allen".
