= John Oldershaw =

John Oldershaw (died 1847) was a British clergyman.

He entered Emmanuel College, Cambridge University in 1771 and was senior wrangler and 1st Smith's prizeman in 1776. He received an M.A. in 1779, a B.D. in 1786.

He was Archdeacon of Norfolk from 1797 to 1847.
