= Sakura Schafer-Nameki =

German mathematical physicist

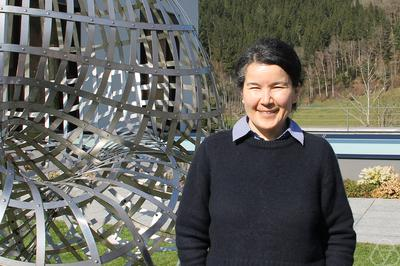
- Schafer-Nameki at Oberwolfach in 2026
- Education: University of Stuttgart, University of Cambridge
- Scientific career
- Workplaces: University of Oxford
- Thesis: D-Branes in Boundary Field Theory (2003)
- Doctoral advisor: Peter Goddard
- Website: www.maths.ox.ac.uk/people/sakura.schafer-nameki

Sakura Schafer-Nameki is a German mathematical physicist working in string theory and supersymmetric gauge theory. She works at the University of Oxford as a Professor of Mathematical Physics in the Mathematical Institute and as a senior research fellow of Wadham College, Oxford.

== Early life and education ==
Although partly of Japanese descent, Schafer-Nameki is originally from Swabia in Germany. She studied both physics and mathematics at the University of Stuttgart from 1995 to 1998. After coming to the University of Cambridge for the Mathematical Tripos, which she passed with distinction in 1999, she remained at Cambridge for doctoral studies. She completed her Ph.D. in 2003; her dissertation, D-Branes in Boundary Field Theory, was supervised by Peter Goddard.

== Career ==
After completing her doctorate, Schafer-Nameki became a postdoctoral researcher at the University of Hamburg, a Postdoctoral Prize Fellow at the California Institute of Technology, and a senior postdoctoral fellow at the Kavli Institute for Theoretical Physics. She took a position as a lecturer at King's College London in 2010, and was promoted to reader in 2014. In 2016 she moved to Oxford as Professor of Mathematical Physics and Tutorial Fellow of Wadham College, becoming a senior research fellow at the college in 2020.

Her research combines string theory and geometry. She was the principal investigator for the five-year European Research Council project "Higgs bundles: Supersymmetric Gauge Theories and Geometry" which began in 2016. In 2020 she joined the Simons Collaboration on Special Holonomy in Geometry, Analysis, and Physics as one of its Principal Investigators.
