= Bewick Bridge =

English vicar and mathematical author (1767–1833)

Bewick Bridge (1767, Linton, Cambridgeshire – 15 May 1833, Cherry Hinton) was an English vicar and mathematical author.

In 1786, he was admitted as a sizar to study mathematics at Peterhouse, Cambridge, where he graduated as senior wrangler and won the Smith's Prize in 1790.

In October 1790, he was ordained a deacon at Ely, and became a priest in 1792; in the same year he became a Fellow at Peterhouse, during which he spent time as both as college moderator and as proctor. From 1806 until 1816, he was Professor of Mathematics at the East India Company College, Haileybury. He wrote a number of mathematical texts: his Algebra achieved international circulation. He became a Fellow of the Royal Society in 1812.

From 1816 until 1833, he was vicar of Cherry Hinton in Cambridge, where in 1818 he built the vicarage, and he founded the village school in 1832 (now a Church of England PrimarySchool). He died on 15 May 1833, aged 66. In September 2011 the Cherry Hinton Community Junior School was named after Bewick, becoming Bewick Bridge Community Primary School.
