= John Kempthorne (hymnwriter) =

John Kempthorne (24 June 1775, Plymouth Dock, Devon – 9 November 1838, Gloucester) was an English clergyman and hymnwriter.

== Life ==
He was the son of Vice-Admiral James Kempthorne (1735–1808). He graduated from St John's College, Cambridge as Senior Wrangler and Smith's Prizeman in 1796, and was elected fellow of St John's from 1796 to 1802.

In his church career he was a protegee of the Hon. Henry Ryder, Bishop of Gloucester from 1815 to 1824 and Bishop of Lichfield and Coventry from 1824 to 1836. Kempthorne was Vicar of Northleach (1816–38), vicar of Preston (1817–20), Rector of St Michael's and St Mary-de-Grace, Gloucester (1825–38), chaplain to the Bishop of Lichfield and Coventry (1824–38) and Prebendary of Lichfield (1825–38). He was an evangelical hymn-writer, credited with composing Praise the Lord, ye heavens adore him. He was opposed to fairs and public entertainments.

The architect Sampson Kempthorne was his son.

== Publications ==
- Select portions of psalms, (London: Hatchard, 1810)
- A warning against attendance at the theatre, the fair, and the race-course, being the substance of a sermon preached last year in the parish church of St. Michael, in the city of Gloucester, previous to the annual recurrence of revelry in or near that city (Gloucester: Verrinder, 1831)
- The Church's self-regulating privilege, (London: Hatchard, 1835)
