= Thomas Parkinson (priest) =

English clergyman

Thomas Parkinson (1744 or 1745 – 13 November 1830) was an English clergyman.

He was born in Kirkham, Lancashire.

He entered Christ's College, Cambridge University in 1764 at age 19 and was senior wrangler and 2nd Smith's prizeman in 1769. He received an M.A. in 1772, a B.D. in 1789, and a D.D. in 1795.

He was Rector of Kegworth, Leicestershire, from 1789 until his death. He became Archdeacon of Huntingdon from 1794 to 1812 and Archdeacon of Leicester from 1812 until his death in 1830.

He was the author of A System of Mechanics and Hydrostatics and was elected a Fellow of the Royal Society in 1786.

He died in Kegworth in 1830.
