= John Hudson (mathematician) =

English mathematician and clergyman

- Born: 1773
- Died: 31 October 1843 (aged 69–70); Haverbrack, England
- Education: Trinity College, Cambridge
- Awards: Smith's prize (1797)
- Scientific career
- Fields: Mathematician
- Workplaces: Trinity College, Cambridge
- Academic advisors: Thomas Jones
- Notable students: Charles James Blomfield; George Peacock

John Hudson (1773 – 31 October 1843) was an English mathematician and clergyman. He was notable for being a senior wrangler as well as the tutor of George Peacock.

== Early life ==
John Hudson was the son of John Hudson, a farmer at Haverbrack in the parish of Beetham. He attended Heversham School and entered Trinity College, Cambridge in 1793. He became senior wrangler in 1797, also winning the Smith's prize in that year, and obtained his MA in 1800.

== Career ==
He became a Fellow, in 1798, and tutor, in 1807, of Trinity College, Cambridge, where he notably tutored George Peacock: he also tutored John Martin Frederick Wright. In 1815, he became the vicar of Kendal, Westmoreland. In 1815, he married the daughter of an army officer by the name of Culliford.

At Cambridge, Hudson also tutored Charles James Blomfield who became a prominent bishop. As a bishop, Blomfield visited Hudson's parish and at a dinner party declared "I remember well, Mr. Hudson, how much I stood in awe of you at College." To which Hudson retorted, "Perhaps so, but your Lordship has turned the tables on me now."

Hudson died at Haverbrack, Tuesday, 31 October 1843 at the age of 71 and was buried in the interior of the parish church at Kendal.
