= Thomas Gaskin =

English clergyman and academic

Thomas Gaskin (1810–1887) was an English clergyman and academic, now known for contributions to mathematics.

== Life ==
After being educated at Sedbergh School between 1822 and 1827, he was admitted a sizar of St John's College, Cambridge in 1827. He was Second Wrangler in the Mathematical Tripos in 1831, behind Samuel Earnshaw. He was then a Fellow of Jesus College, Cambridge from 1832 to 1842, when he married. He became a Fellow of the Royal Astronomical Society in 1836, and of the Royal Society in 1839. In 1840 Gaskin and his fellow examiner J. Bowstead unilaterally abolished the Tripos system of viva voce examinations in Latin, which had become an obsolete formality.

Gaskin spent the latter part of his career as a private coach, moving to Cheltenham in 1855.

== Works ==
Gaskin is now remembered for his work on the equation for the figure of the Earth, of Pierre-Simon Laplace. While it was important for geodesy, from a Cambridge point of view its introduction to the syllabus of the Tripos, as intended by William Whewell, proved troublesome. Whewell had George Biddell Airy write on it in his 1826 Tracts, but the solution of the equation appeared unmotivated. John Henry Pratt in Mathematical Principles of Mechanical Philosophy (1836) returned to the topic, clarifying it. Alexander John Ellis worked on the solution of the equation in 1836, as an undergraduate. Then in 1839 Gaskin produced a solution procedure by a differential operator method, setting the result of his investigation as a Tripos question. It immediately gained textbook status in the Differential Equations of John Hymers. The work proved seminal, influencing Robert Leslie Ellis to further developments of symbolic methods; and is credited with a stimulus to the On A General Method of Analysis (1844), the paper making the reputation of George Boole.

Gaskin published little original mathematics by the conventional route of the learned journal; but made his research public in Tripos questions (he was an examiner six times between 1835 and 1851). Later Edward Routh commented on the extensive adoption of Gaskin's problems into the common fund of understanding of the subject.
