= Thomas Penny White =

Thomas Penny White (1777, Marylebone, London – 24 July 1845, Winchester) was an English clergyman.

Thomas Penny White was born in 1777 in Marylebone, London. He attended Queens' College, Cambridge and graduated B.A. 1802 (Senior Wrangler) and M.A. 1805. He became a Fellow of the College and presented a £30 annual prize. He was Minister of St John the Baptist's Chapel, Winchester, Rector of Droxford, Hampshire.

On 3 December 1812 he married Charlotte Eliza Channing - she was born in 1791 - at St Mary's Church, Marylebone Road, London. They had at least two sons, one, Arthur David White, born 1815 who died in 1899.

Thomas Penny died at his house in Winchester on 24 July 1845. Charlotte outlived him by nearly sixteen years dying at Notting Hill, London on 16 January 1861.
