= Robert Acklom Ingram =

English mathematician, clergyman and political economist

Robert Acklom Ingram (1763–1809) was an English mathematician, clergyman and political economist.

== Life ==
He was born on 6 June 1763 (others say 6 July 1761) in Wormingford, the son of Rev. Robert Ingram (1727–1804) of Boxted, Essex and Katherine Acklom (1727–1809). He went to school in Dedham, Essex and graduated Senior Wrangler from Queens' College, Cambridge in 1784, becoming a fellow and was tutor of the college (1785–1802). He was also rector of Seagrave, Leicestershire from 1803 to 1809.

Ingram died on 5 February 1809 in Seagrave.

== Works ==
As a political economist Ingram was concerned with poverty and the welfare of the working classes. He is noted for his tract Disquisitions on Population (London, 1808) opposing the views of Malthus as expressed in An Essay on the Principle of Population.

His major works are:

- The Necessity of introducing Divinity into the regular Course of Academical Studies considered, Colchester, 1792.
- An Enquiry into the present Condition of the Lower Classes, and the means of improving it; including some Remarks on Mr. Pitt's Bill for the better Support and Maintenance of the Poor: in the course of which the policy of the Corn Laws is examined, and various other important branches of Political Economy are illustrated, London, 1797. Ingram argued that wages had been driven down by additions to the agricultural labour force.
- A Syllabus or Abstract of a System of Political Philosophy; to which is prefixed a Dissertation recommending that the Study of Political Economy be encouraged in our Universities, and that a Course of Lectures be delivered on that subject, London, 1800.
- An Essay on the importance of Schools of Industry and Religious Instruction; in which the necessity of Promoting the good Education of poor Girls is particularly considered, London, 1801.
- The Causes of the Increase of Methodism and Dissension, and of the Popularity of what is called Evangelical Preaching, and the means of obviating them, considered in a Sermon [on Rom. xiv. 17, 19]. To which is added a Postscript … on Mr. Whitbread's Bill … for encouraging of Industry among the Labouring Classes, London, 1807.
- Disquisitions on Population, in which the Principles of the Essay on Population, by T. R. Malthus, are examined and refuted, London, 1808.

== Family ==
Ingram married Matilda Springthorpe (1779–1859), daughter of Richard Springthorpe (b 1743) of Ashby-de-la-Zouch, Leicestershire and Matilda Allsopp (d 1811), on 25 Apr 1805 at Rempstone, there were three children by this marriage. The eldest, daughter Matilda (1806–1886), married Dixon Robinson (1795–1878) of Clitheroe Castle, Lancashire. The second Robert (1807-1879) also became a clergyman, the first vicar of Chatburn Lancashire. The youngest, daughter Catherine Ann (1808-1888), married John Johnson of Ashby de la Zouch.
