= Philippa Fawcett =

English mathematician and educator (1868–1948)

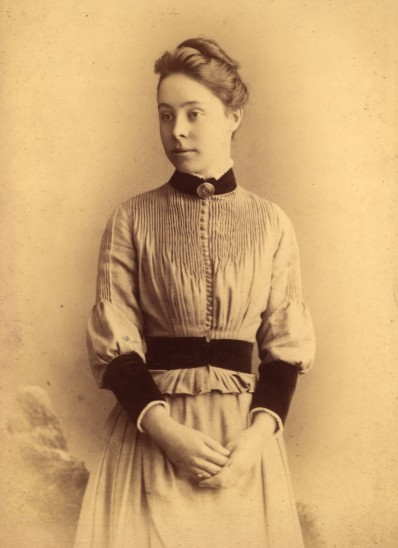
- Fawcett in 1891
- Born: Philippa Garrett Fawcett; 4 April 1868; Pimlico, England
- Died: 10 June 1948 (aged 80); Hendon, England
- Education: Newnham College, Cambridge; Bedford College, London
- Known for: First woman ranked "above Senior Wrangler"
- Scientific career
- Fields: Mathematics
- Workplaces: London County Council
- Academic advisors: Ernest William Hobson

Philippa Garrett Fawcett (4 April 1868 – 10 June 1948) was an English mathematician and educator. She was the first woman to obtain the top score in the Cambridge Mathematical Tripos exams. She taught at Newnham College, Cambridge, and at the normal school (teacher training college) in Johannesburg, and she became an administrator for the London County Council.

== Family ==
Philippa Garrett Fawcett was born on 4 April 1868, the daughter of the suffragist Millicent Fawcett (née Garrett) and Henry Fawcett MP, Professor of Political Economy at Cambridge and Postmaster General in Gladstone's second government. Her aunt was Elizabeth Garrett Anderson, the first English female doctor. When her father died, she and her mother went to live with Millicent's sister Agnes Garrett, who had set up an interior design business on Gower Street, Bloomsbury.

== Education ==
Philippa Fawcett was educated at Bedford College, London (now Royal Holloway), and Newnham College, Cambridge, which had been co-founded by her mother.

In 1890, Fawcett became the first woman to obtain the top score in the Cambridge Mathematical Tripos exam, but since she could not receive a degree from Cambridge due to being a woman, she could not be the senior wrangler. Cambridge did not offer degrees to women until 1948. No woman became the senior wrangler until Ruth Hendry in 1992.

An anonymous poem written in 1890 paying tribute to Fawcett's Tripos achievement climaxes with the following two stanzas, mentioning the other respected mathematicians Arthur Cayley and George Salmon:

Curve and angle let her con and
Parallelopipedon and
Parallelogram
Few can equal, none can beat her
At eliminating theta
By the river Cam.

May she increase in knowledge daily
Till the great Professor Cayley
Owns himself surpassed
Till the great Professor Salmon
Votes his own achievements gammon
And admires aghast.

Coming amidst the women's suffrage movement, Fawcett's feat gathered worldwide media coverage, spurring much discussion about women's capacities and rights. The lead story in the Telegraph the following day said:

Once again has woman demonstrated her superiority in the face of an incredulous and somewhat unsympathetic world ... And now the last trench has been carried by Amazonian assault, and the whole citadel of learning lies open and defenceless before the victorious students of Newnham and Girton. There is no longer any field of learning in which the lady student does not excel.

== Career ==
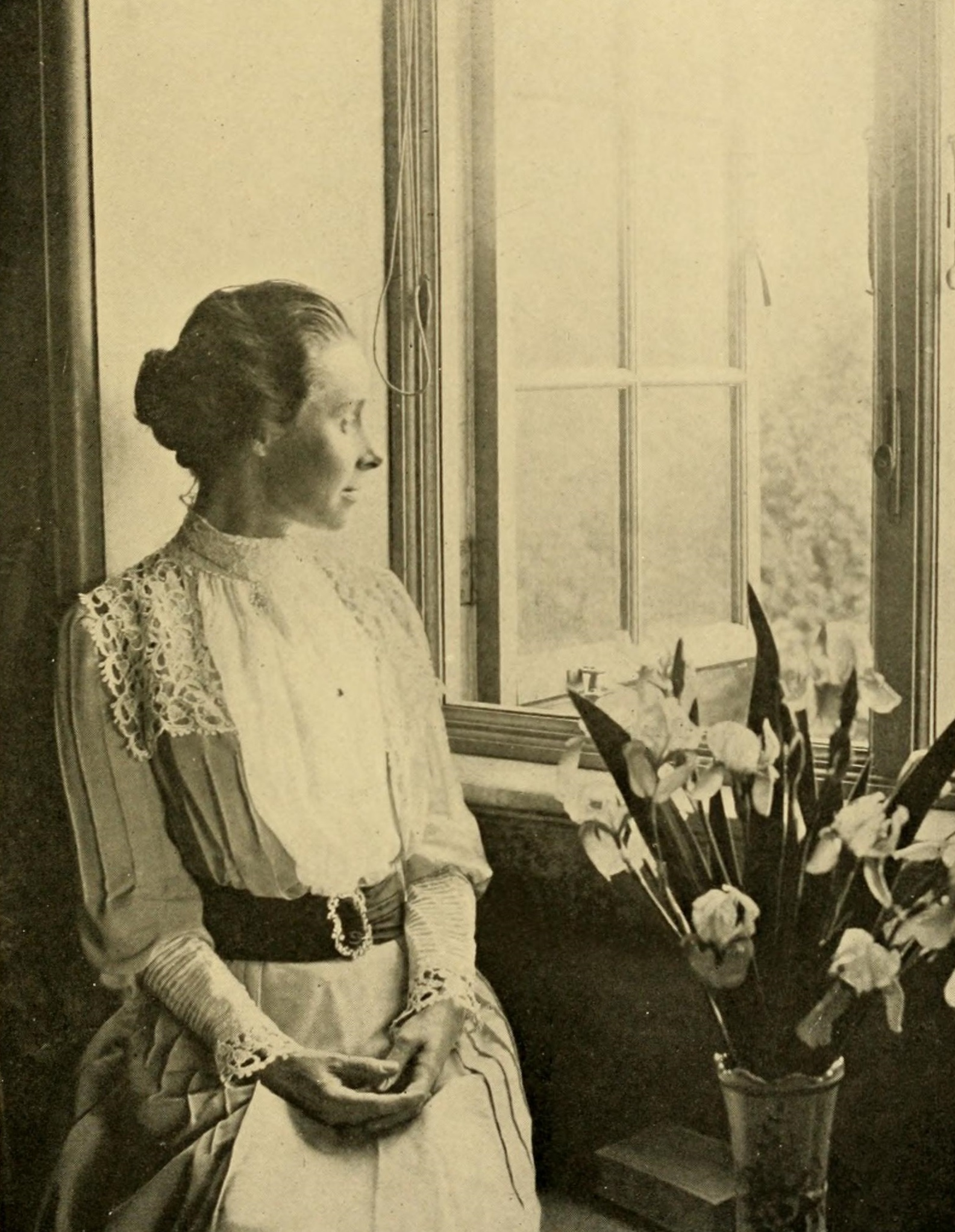
Fawcett in her room at Newnham College (1891)

Following Fawcett's achievement in the Tripos, she won the Marion Kennedy scholarship at Cambridge through which she conducted research in fluid dynamics. Her published papers include "Note on the Motion of Solids in a Liquid". She was appointed a college lecturer in mathematics at Newnham College, a position she held for 10 years. In this capacity, her teaching abilities received considerable praise. One student wrote:

What I remember most vividly of Miss Fawcett's coaching was her concentration, speed, and infectious delight in what she was teaching. She was ruthless towards mistakes and carelessness ... My deepest debt to her is a sense of the unity of all truth, from the smallest detail to the highest that we know

Fawcett left Cambridge in 1902, when she was appointed as a lecturer to train mathematics teachers at the Normal School (teacher training college) in Johannesburg, then in Transvaal Colony, now part of the University of Pretoria, South Africa. She remained there, setting up schools throughout the country, until 1905, when she returned to Britain to take a position in the administration of education for London County Council. At the LCC, in her work developing secondary schools, she attained a high rank. Denied a Cambridge degree by reason of her sex, she was one of the steamboat ladies who travelled to Ireland between 1904 and 1907 to receive an ad eundem University of Dublin degree at Trinity College.

Fawcett maintained strong links with Newnham College throughout her life. The Fawcett building (1938) was named in recognition of her contribution to the college, and that of her family. She died in Hendon on 10 June 1948, two months after her 80th birthday, a month after the Grace that allowed women to be awarded the Cambridge BA degree received royal assent (see women's education at the University of Cambridge).

== Legacy ==
The Philippa Fawcett Internship Programme is a summer research program at the Centre for Mathematical Sciences in the University of Cambridge. It received its first group of interns in 2020.

On the University of Cambridge's West Cambridge site, Philippa Fawcett Drive sits alongside roads named after other celebrated contributors to STEM subjects, such as Ada Lovelace, Charles Babbage, and J. J. Thomson.

The Philippa Fawcett Teaching College was named after her.

== See also ==
- Sarah Woodhead, the first woman to attempt, and to pass, the Cambridge Mathematical Tripos exam
- Timeline of women in mathematics
- Timeline of women in science
