= John Bell (barrister) =

18th and 19th century English barrister and equity lawyer

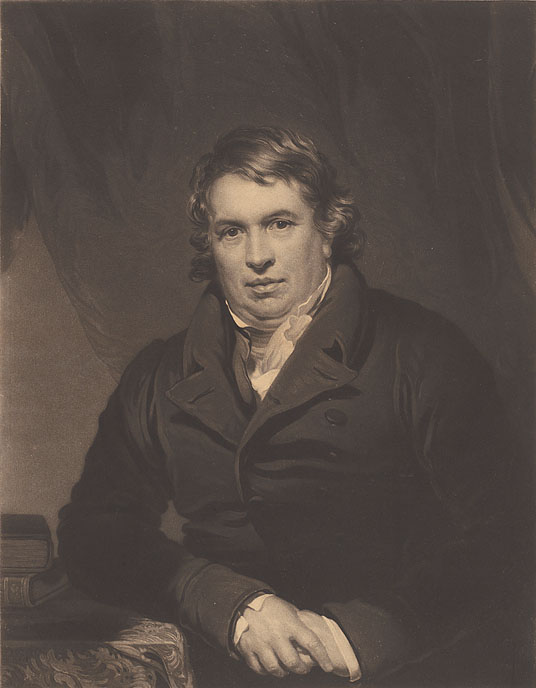
Bell in an 1832 mezzotint by Samuel Cousins from a portrait by Thomas Stewardson.

John Bell, KC, FRS (23 October 1764 – 6 February 1836) was an English barrister and equity lawyer.

Born in Kendal, Westmoreland, Bell was educated at Trinity College, Cambridge, graduating senior wrangler in 1786 and becoming a fellow. He entered Gray's Inn in 1789, a pupil of Samuel Romilly, and was called to the bar in 1792. He entered Lincoln's Inn in 1797, became a bencher of Gray's Inn in 1813 and became King's Counsel in 1816.

Despite being a notoriously poor speaker, he attained distinction as an equity lawyer at the Court of Chancery. Lord Eldon called him the best equity lawyer in England, though he could "neither read, write, walk, nor talk". Bell gave extended evidence to the Chancery Commissioners in 1824–5, and published Thoughts on Alterations in the Court of Chancery in 1830. Amongst his professional pupils was Henry Bickersteth, later Master of the Rolls and created Lord Langdale.

He was elected a Fellow of the Royal Society in 1824.

He died in 1836 at his home in Bedford Square, London.
