= Miles Bland =

English cleric and mathematician

Miles Bland (11 October 1786 – 27 December 1867) was an English cleric and mathematician.

== Life ==
Bland was educated at Sedbergh School and thereafter at St John's College, Cambridge, where he graduated B.A. in 1808, as second wrangler and Smith's prizeman. He was then elected fellow (5 April 1808) and tutor of his college, and acted as moderator (1814, 1815, 1816) and public examiner (1817–1818) in mathematics.

Bland became rector of Lilley, Hertfordshire, in 1823, and a prebendary of Wells Cathedral in 1826, when he proceeded D.D. He was a fellow of the Royal Society, of the Society of Antiquaries of London, and of the Royal Astronomical Society. He died 27 December 1867 in Ramsgate, Kent.

== Works ==
Bland's main works were:

- Geometrical Problems . . . from the first six books of Euclid . . . with the elements of Plane Trigonometry, Cambridge, 1819, 2nd edit. 1821, 3rd edit. 1827.
- Algebraical Problems, a schoolbook, first published in 1812, 9th edit. 1849.
- The Elements of Hydrostatics, 1824, 1827.
- Annotations on the Historical Books of the New Testament; vol. i. St. Matthew's Gospel (1828), vol. ii. St. Mark's Gospel (1828), Mechanical and Philosophical Problems,' 1830.

== Notes ==
Attribution

This article incorporates text from a publication now in the public domain: Stephen, Leslie, ed. (1886). "Bland, Miles". Dictionary of National Biography. Vol. 5. London: Smith, Elder & Co.
