= Stephen Parkinson (mathematician) =

British mathematician (1823–1889)

Stephen Parkinson, FSA (1 August 1823 – 2 January 1889) was a British mathematician.

== Early life and education ==
Born in Keighley, West Yorkshire, Parkinson went up to St John's College, Cambridge, as a sizar in 1841 and graduated as Senior Wrangler in 1845, beating William Thomson (later to become Lord Kelvin). He was elected to a Fellowship at St John's in the same year. He was ordained in 1851, made BD in 1855 and DD in 1869.

== Life ==
He was College lecturer in mathematics, tutor and President (1865–89). He was made a Fellow of the Royal Society in 1870.

Parkinson was the author of two mathematical textbooks, Elementary Treatise on Mechanics (1855) and A Treatise on Optics (1859).
