= Percival Frost =

British mathematician

Percival Frost (1817–1898), was an English mathematician.

== Life ==
Percival Frost was born at Kingston upon Hull on 1 September 1817, the second son of Charles Frost. He was educated at Beverley and Oakham, and entered St. John's College, Cambridge, in October 1835, graduating B.A. as second wrangler in 1839 and M.A. in 1842. He was chosen first Smith prizeman in 1839, beating the senior wrangler, Benjamin Morgan Cowie, his fellow-collegian, and he was elected to a fellowship at St. John's College on 19 March. In 1841 he was ordained deacon, and in the same year vacated his fellowship by marriage. He held a mathematical lectureship in Jesus College from 1847 to 1859, and in King's College from 1859 to 1889; but his chief work consisted in the tuition of private pupils, among whom were John Rigby, William Kingdon Clifford, and Joseph Wolstenholme.

He was a man of wide interests and varied attainments, an accomplished pianoforte player, and a successful painter in water-colours. On 2 June 1841 he was married at Finchley to Jennett Louisa, daughter of Richard Dixon of Oak Lodge, Finchley.

In 1854, Frost edited the first three sections of Philosophiae Naturalis Principia Mathematica by Isaac Newton. New editions were published in 1863, 1878, and 1883. In 1863 he prepared, in conjunction with Joseph Wolstenholme, A Treatise on Solid Geometry, of which second and third editions, by Frost alone, appeared in 1875 and 1886. Hints for the Solution of Problems in the Third Edition of Solid Geometry was published in 1887. His third work, An Elementary Treatise on Curve Tracing, appeared in 1872.

On 7 June 1883, Frost was admitted as a fellow of the Royal Society, and in the same year he was elected by King's College, Cambridge, to a fellowship, which he retained until his death. In 1883 Frost proceeded to the recently established degree of Doctor of Science.

Frost died at Cambridge on 5 June 1898, at his house in Fitzwilliam Street, and was buried on 10 June in the Mill Road cemetery, Cambridge.

Besides the works already mentioned, Frost was the author of numerous papers in the Cambridge Mathematical Journal, the Oxford and Cambridge Journal of Mathematics, and the Quarterly Journal of Mathematics.

== Works ==
- 1854: Newton's Principia, sections I, II, III with Notes and Illustrations and a Collection of Problems, link from Internet Archive.
- 1863: (with Joseph Wolstenholme) A Treatise on Solid Geometry, link from Hathitrust
- 1872: An Elementary Treatise on Curve Tracing, link from HathiTrust.
