= Mathematical Tripos =

Mathematics course taught in the Faculty of Mathematics, University of Cambridge

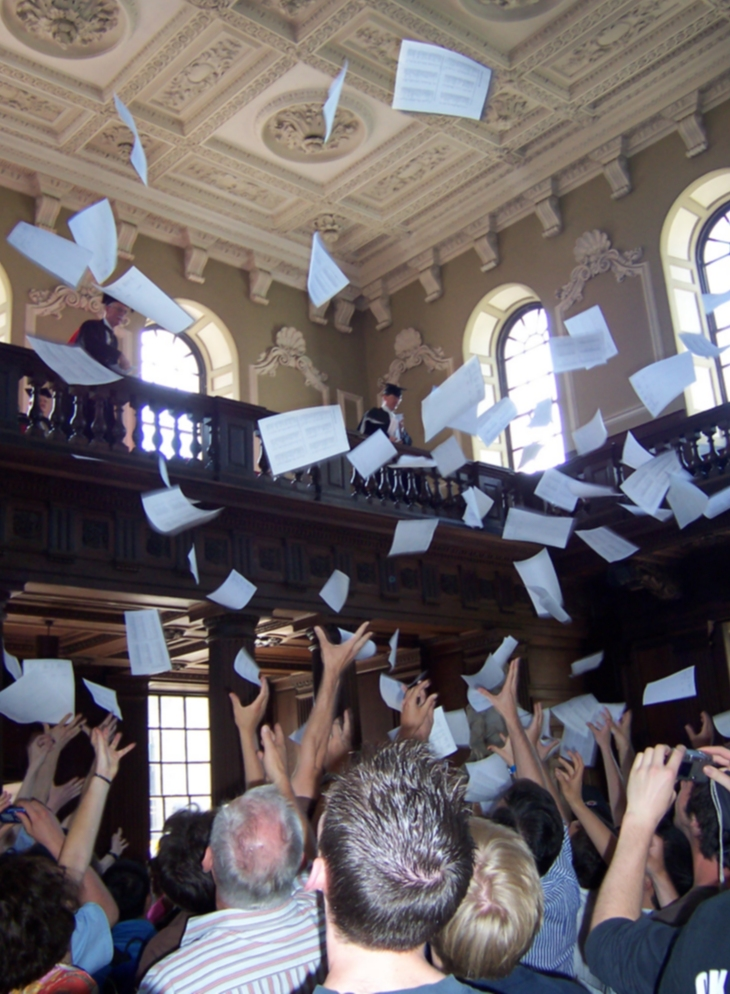
- Results for parts II and III of the Mathematical Tripos are read out inside the Senate House, Cambridge, and then, tossed from the balcony.
- Type: Bachelor of Arts (BA) degree; Master of Mathematics (MMath) degree; Master of Advanced Study (MASt) degree
- Skills tested: Mathematics
- Duration: 3 or 4 years
- Regions: University of Cambridge
- Languages: English language
- Website: maths.cam.ac.uk/undergrad

The Mathematical Tripos is the mathematics course that is taught in the Faculty of Mathematics at the University of Cambridge.

== Origin ==
In its classical 19th century form, the tripos was a distinctive written examination of undergraduate students of the University of Cambridge. Prior to 1824, the Mathematical Tripos was formally known as the "Senate House Examination". From about 1780 to 1909, the "Old Tripos" was distinguished by a number of features, including the publication of an order of merit of successful candidates, and the difficulty of the mathematical problems set for solution. By way of example, in 1854, the Tripos consisted of 16 papers spread over eight days, totalling 44.5 hours. The total number of questions was 211. It was divided into two parts, with Part I (the first three days) covering more elementary topics.

The actual marks for the exams were never published, but there is reference to an exam in the 1860s where, out of a total possible mark of 17,000, the senior wrangler achieved 7,634, the second wrangler 4,123, the lowest wrangler around 1,500 and the lowest scoring candidate obtaining honours (the wooden spoon) 237; about 100 candidates were awarded honours. The 300-odd candidates below that level did not earn honours and were known as poll men.

The questions for the 1841 examination may be found within Cambridge University Magazine (pages 191–208). Questions from 1876 are reprinted in Lord Rayleigh's collected works.

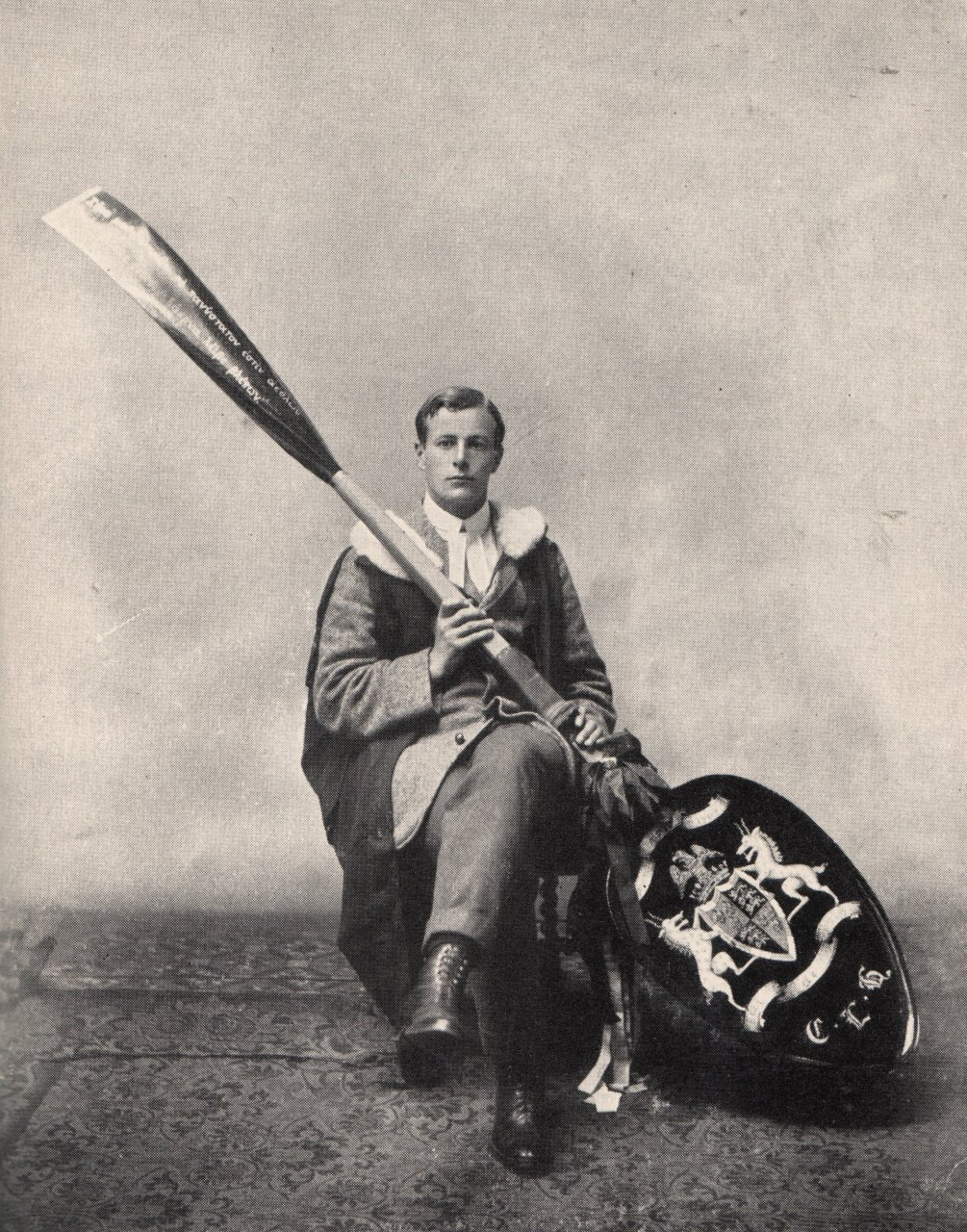
Wooden Spoon award, 1910

=== Influence ===
According to the study Masters of Theory: Cambridge and the Rise of Mathematical Physics by Andrew Warwick during this period the style of teaching and study required for the successful preparation of students had a wide influence:

- on the development of 'mixed mathematics' (a precursor of later applied mathematics, descriptive geometry and mathematical physics, with emphasis on algebraic manipulative mastery)
- on mathematical education
- as vocational training for fields such as astronomy
- in the reception of new physical theories, particularly in electromagnetism as expounded by James Clerk Maxwell

Since Cambridge students did a lot of rote learning called "bookwork", it was noted by Augustus De Morgan and repeated by Andrew Warwick that authors of Cambridge textbooks skipped known material. In consequence, "non-Cambridge readers ... found the arguments impossible to follow".

From the 1820s to the 1840s, analytic topics such as elliptical integrals were introduced to the curriculum. Under William Whewell, the Tripos' scope changed to one of 'mixed mathematics', with the inclusion of topics from physics such as electricity, heat and magnetism. Students would have to study intensely to perform routine problems rapidly.

=== Early history ===
The early history is of the gradual replacement during the middle of the eighteenth century of a traditional method of oral examination by written papers, with a simultaneous switch in emphasis from Latin disputation to mathematical questions. That is, all degree candidates were expected to show at least competence in mathematics. A long process of development of coaching—tuition usually outside the official University and college courses—went hand-in-hand with a gradual increase in the difficulty of the most testing questions asked. The standard examination pattern of bookwork (mostly memorised theorems) plus rider (problems to solve, testing comprehension of the bookwork) was introduced.

=== Wranglers and their coaches ===
The list of wranglers (the candidates awarded a first-class degree) became in time the subject of a great deal of public attention. According to Alexander Macfarlane

To obtain high honours in the Mathematical Tripos, a student must put himself in special training under a mathematician, technically called a coach, who is not one of the regular college instructors, nor one of the University professors, but simply makes a private business of training men to pass that particular examination. Skill consists in the rate at which one can solve and more especially write out the solution of problems. It is excellent training of a kind, but there is not time for studying fundamental principles, still less for making any philosophical investigations. Mathematical insight is something higher than skill in solving problems; consequently the senior wrangler has not always turned out the most distinguished mathematician in after life.

William Hopkins was the first coach distinguished by his students' performances. When he retired in 1849, one of his students, Edward Routh, became the dominant coach. Another coach, William Henry Besant, published a textbook, Elementary Hydrostatics, containing mathematical exercises and solutions such as would benefit students preparing for Tripos. After Routh retired in 1888, Robert Rumsey Webb coached many of the top wranglers. Warwick notes that college teaching improved toward the end of the 19th century:

The expansion of intercollegiate and university lectures at all levels through the 1880s and 1890s meant that, by 1900, it had become unnecessary for coaches either to lecture students or even to provide them with manuscripts covering the mathematical methods they were required to master. The prime job to the coach now was to ensure that students were attending an appropriate range of courses and that they understood what they were being taught. … This curtailment of responsibility made it virtually impossible for a private tutor to dominate undergraduate training the way that Hopkins, Routh, and Webb had done.

A fellow of Trinity College, Robert Alfred Herman, then was associated with several of the top wranglers as their coach.

When A. R. Forsyth wrote his retrospective in 1935, he recalled Webb, Percival Frost, Herman, and Besant as the best coaches. Other coaches that produced top wranglers include E. W. Hobson, John Hilton Grace, H. F. Baker, Thomas John I'Anson Bromwich, and A. E. H. Love.

=== Athletics ===
Apart from intellectual preparation, the challenge of Tripos was its duration: "The examinations themselves were intended partly as tests of endurance, taking place on consecutive mornings and afternoons for four and five days together." Brisk walking was taken up by many candidates to build up their stamina. As the nineteenth century progressed walking turned to athletics and other competitive sports including rowing and swimming. The coaches set the example: Routh had a two-hour constitutional walk daily, while "Besant was a mountaineer, Webb a walker, and Frost was extremely proficient in cricket, tennis, running and swimming." By 1900, there were twenty-three recognized sports contested at Cambridge.

=== Women ===
In 1873, Sarah Woodhead became the first woman to take, and to pass, the Mathematical Tripos.

In 1880, Charlotte Angas Scott obtained special permission to take the Mathematical Tripos, as women were not normally allowed to sit for that exam. She came eighth on the Tripos of all students taking them, but due to her sex, the title of "eighth wrangler", a high honour, went officially to a male student. At the ceremony, however, after the seventh wrangler had been announced, all the students in the audience shouted her name. Because she could not attend the award ceremony, Scott celebrated her accomplishment at Girton College where there were cheers and clapping at dinner, a special evening ceremony where the students sang "See the Conquering Hero Comes", received an ode written by a staff member, and was crowned with laurels.

Since 1881 women were allowed to take the Mathematical Tripos, and their exam scores listed, although separately from the men's and thus not included in the rankings. Women obtaining the necessary score also received a special certificate instead of the BA degree with honours.

In 1890, Philippa Fawcett became the first woman to obtain the top score in the Mathematical Tripos, but since she could not receive a degree from Cambridge due to being a woman, she could not be the senior wrangler. Cambridge did not offer degrees to women until 1948.

No woman became the senior wrangler until Ruth Hendry in 1992.

== 1909 reforms ==
Reforms were implemented in 1909. The undergraduate course of mathematics at Cambridge still reflects a historically broad approach; and problem-solving skills are tested in examinations, though the setting of excessively taxing questions has been discouraged for many years.

Example questions from 1881, before the reforms, are quoted in A Mathematician's Miscellany:

(b) A sphere spinning in equilibrium on top of a rough horizontal cylinder is slightly disturbed; prove that the track of the point of contact is initially a helix. (c) If the sphere has a centrally symmetrical law of density such as to make the radius of gyration a certain fraction of the radius then, whatever the spin, the track is a helix so long as contact lasts. (Marked at 200; a second part about further details carried another 105.)

== The modern tripos ==
As of 2018, the Mathematical Tripos course comprises three undergraduate years (Parts IA, IB and II) which qualify a student for a BA degree, and an optional one year masters course (Part III) which qualifies a student for a Master of Mathematics (MMath) degree (with BA) if they are a Cambridge fourth year student or a Master of Advanced Study (MASt) degree if they come from outside just to do Part III. Assessment is mostly by written examination at the end of each academic year, with some coursework elements in the second, third and fourth years.

During the undergraduate part of the course, students are expected to attend around 12 one-hour lectures per week on average, together with two supervisions. Supervisions are informal sessions in which a small group of students—normally a pair—goes through previously completed example sheets under the guidance of a faculty member, college fellow or graduate student.

During the first year, Part IA, the schedule of courses is quite rigid, providing much of the basic knowledge requisite for mathematics, including algebra, analysis, methods in calculus, and probability. The second year, Part IB, contains no mandatory content but it is recommended that students do particular courses as they are essential prerequisites for further courses. A range of pure courses, such as geometry, complex analysis and a course studying group theory, rings and modules are on offer as well as applied courses on electromagnetism, quantum mechanics and fluid dynamics. In Part II, students are free to choose from a large number of courses over a wide range of mathematical topics; these are separated into more accessible C courses and D courses which are more involved. Some students choose to exchange 25% of the first-year mathematics options in exchange for the Physics option of first-year Natural Sciences Tripos with the possibility of changing to Natural Sciences at the end of the first year.
