= Charles Babbage =

English mathematician, philosopher, and engineer (1791–1871)

Charles Babbage KH FRS
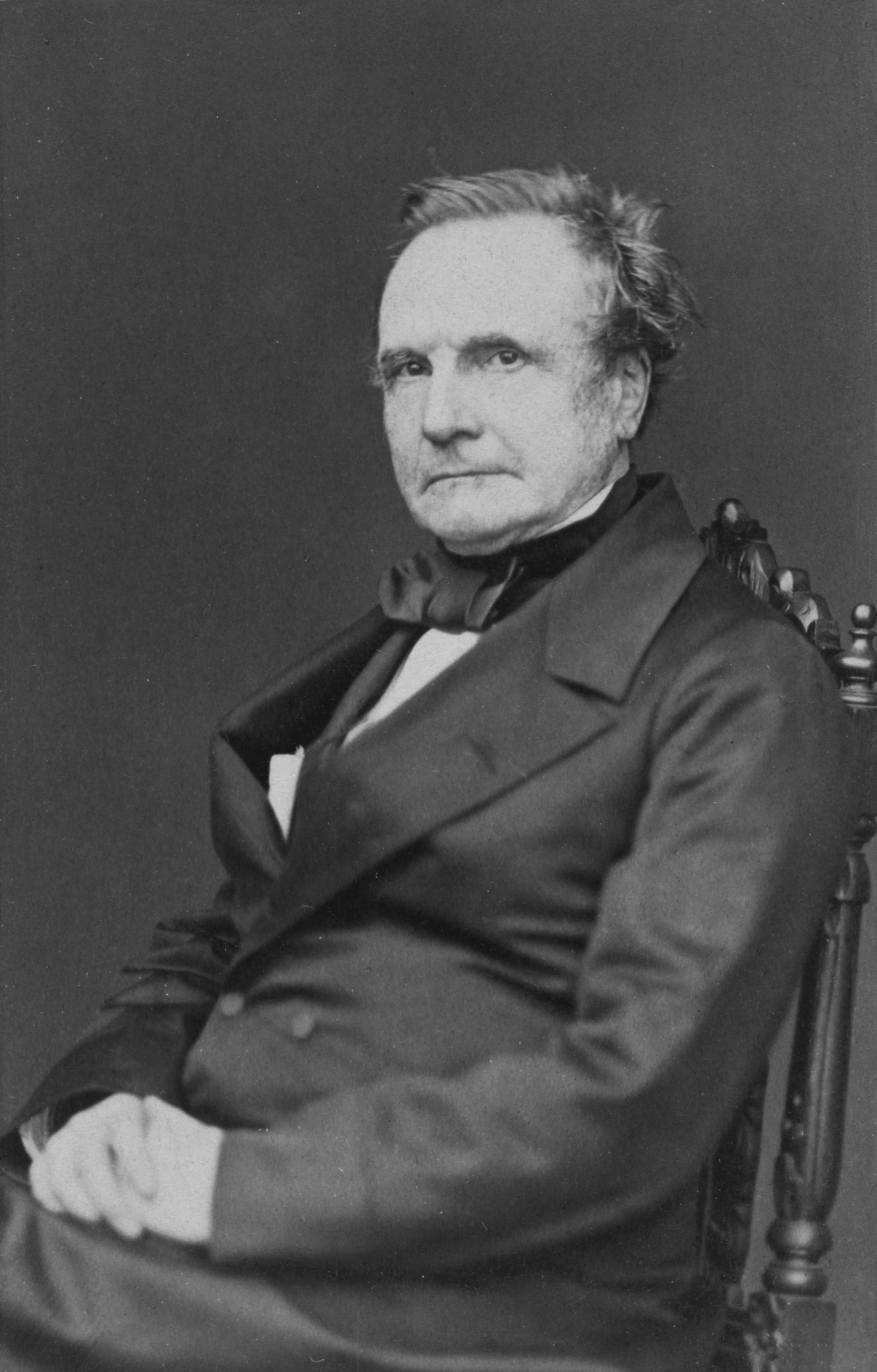
- Babbage in 1860
- Born: 26 December 1791; London, England
- Died: 18 October 1871 (aged 79); Marylebone, London, England
- Education: Peterhouse, Cambridge
- Known for: Analytical engine Difference engine
- Spouse: Georgiana Whitmore (m. 1814; died 1827)
- Children: 8, including Benjamin Herschel Babbage and Henry Prevost Babbage
- Relatives: William Wolryche-Whitmore (brother-in-law)
- Awards: Gold Medal of the Royal Astronomical Society (1824)
- Scientific career
- Fields: Mathematics, engineering, political economy, computer science
- Workplaces: Trinity College, Cambridge, Peterhouse, Cambridge

Charles Babbage (/ˈbæbɪdʒ/; 26 December 1791 – 18 October 1871) was an English polymath. A mathematician, philosopher, inventor and mechanical engineer, Babbage originated the concept of a digital programmable computer.

Babbage is considered by some to merit the title of "father of the computer". He is credited with inventing the first mechanical computer, the difference engine, that eventually led to more complex electronic designs, though all the essential ideas of modern computers are to be found in his analytical engine, programmed using a principle openly borrowed from the Jacquard loom. As part of his computer work, he also designed the first computer printers. He had a broad range of interests in addition to his work on computers, covered in his 1832 book Economy of Manufactures and Machinery. He was an important figure in the social scene in London, and is credited with importing the "scientific soirée" from France with his well-attended Saturday evening soirées. His varied work in other fields has led him to be described as "pre-eminent" among the many polymaths of his century.

Babbage, who died before the complete successful engineering of many of his designs, including his Difference Engine and Analytical Engine, remained a prominent figure in the ideating of computing. Parts of his incomplete mechanisms are on display in the Science Museum in London. In 1991, a functioning difference engine was constructed from the original plans. Built to tolerances achievable in the 19th century, the success of the finished engine indicated that Babbage's machine would have worked.

== Early life ==
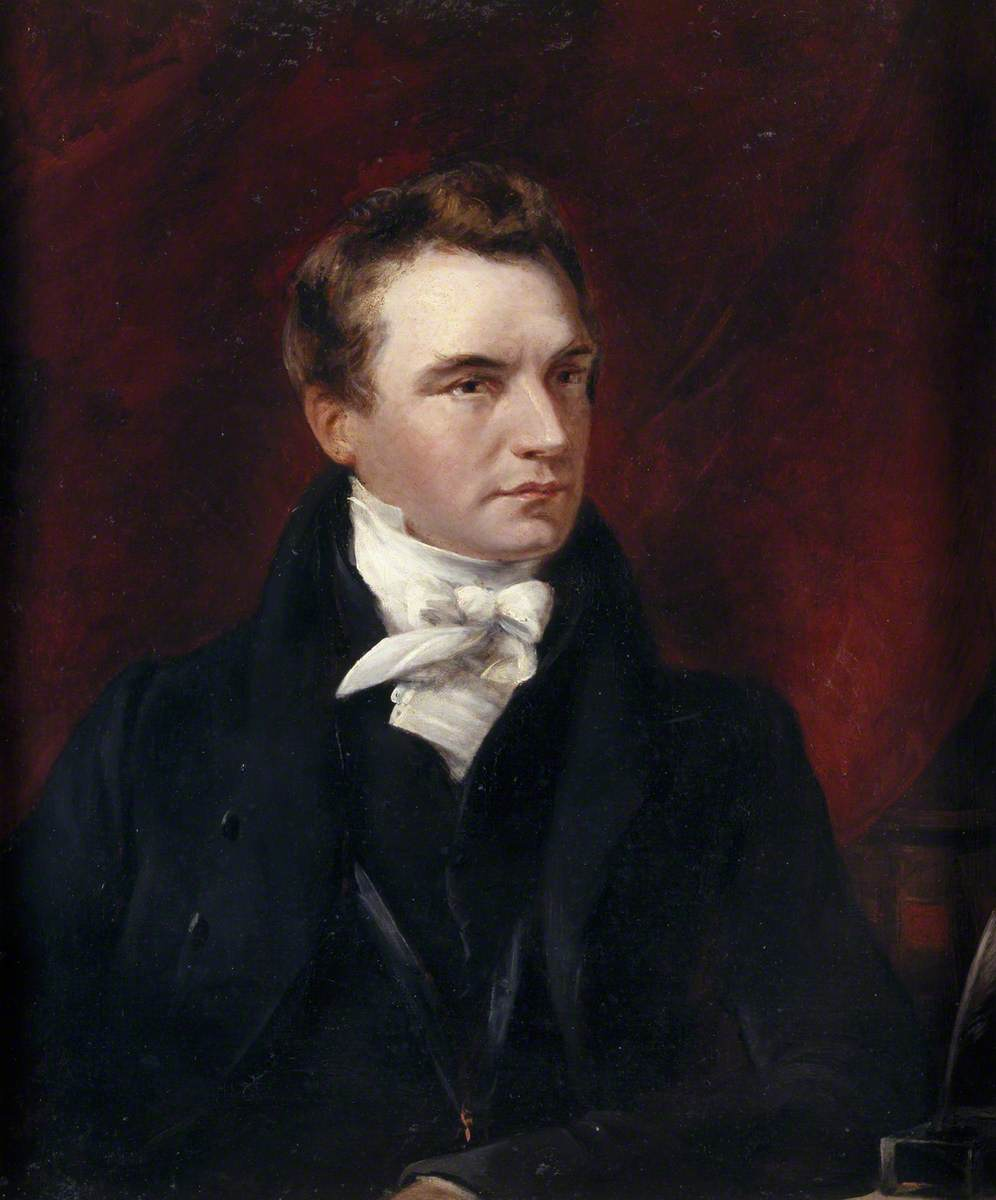
Portrait of Charles Babbage (c. 1820)

Babbage's birthplace is disputed, but according to the Oxford Dictionary of National Biography he was most likely born at 44 Crosby Row, Walworth Road, London, England. A blue plaque on the junction of Larcom Street and Walworth Road commemorates the event.

His date of birth was given in his obituary in The Times as 26 December 1792; but then a nephew wrote to say that Babbage was born one year earlier, in 1791. The parish register of St. Mary's, Newington, London, shows that Babbage was baptised on 6 January 1792, supporting a birth year of 1791.

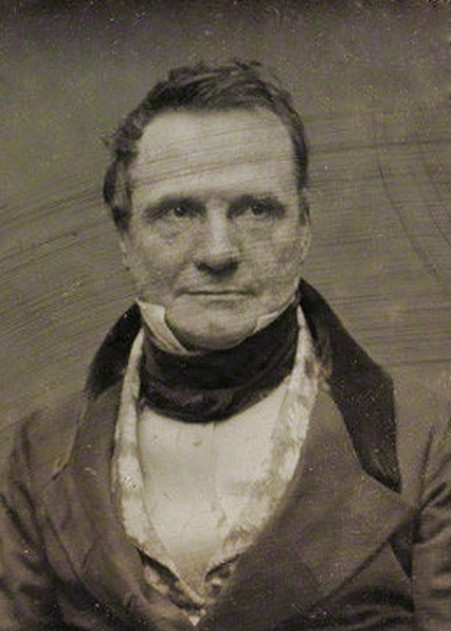
Babbage c. 1850

Babbage was one of four children of Benjamin Babbage and Betsy Plumleigh Teape. His father was a banking partner of William Praed in founding Praed's & Co. of Fleet Street, London, in 1801. In 1808, the Babbage family moved into the old Rowdens house in East Teignmouth. Around the age of eight, Babbage was sent to a country school in Alphington near Exeter to recover from a life-threatening fever. For a short time, he attended King Edward VI Grammar School in Totnes, South Devon, but his health forced him back to private tutors for a time.

Babbage then joined the 30-student Holmwood Academy, in Baker Street, Enfield, Middlesex, under the Reverend Stephen Freeman. The academy had a library that prompted Babbage's love of mathematics. He studied with two more private tutors after leaving the academy. The first was a clergyman near Cambridge; through him Babbage encountered Charles Simeon and his evangelical followers, but the tuition was not what he needed. He was brought home, to study at the Totnes school: this was at age 16 or 17. The second was an Oxford tutor, under whom Babbage reached a level in Classics sufficient to be accepted by the University of Cambridge.

== At the University of Cambridge ==
Babbage arrived at Trinity College, Cambridge, in October 1810. He was already self-taught in some parts of contemporary mathematics; he had read Robert Woodhouse, Joseph Louis Lagrange, and Maria Gaetana Agnesi. As a result, he was disappointed in the standard mathematical instruction available at the university.

Babbage, John Herschel, George Peacock, and several other friends formed the Analytical Society in 1812; they were also close to Edward Ryan. As a student, Babbage was also a member of other societies such as The Ghost Club, concerned with investigating supernatural phenomena, and the Extractors Club, dedicated to liberating its members from the madhouse, should any be committed to one.

In 1812, Babbage transferred to Peterhouse, Cambridge. He was the top mathematician there, but did not graduate with honours. He instead received a degree without examination in 1814. He had defended a thesis that was considered blasphemous in the preliminary public disputation, but it is not known whether this fact is related to his not sitting the examination.

== After Cambridge ==
Considering his reputation, Babbage quickly made progress. He lectured to the Royal Institution on astronomy in 1815, and was elected a Fellow of the Royal Society in 1816. After graduation, on the other hand, he applied for positions unsuccessfully, and had little in the way of a career. In 1816 he was a candidate for a teaching job at Haileybury College; he had recommendations from James Ivory and John Playfair, but lost out to Henry Walter. In 1819, Babbage and Herschel visited Paris and the Society of Arcueil, meeting leading French mathematicians and physicists. That year Babbage applied to be professor at the University of Edinburgh, with the recommendation of Pierre Simon Laplace; the post went to William Wallace.

With Herschel, Babbage worked on the electrodynamics of Arago's rotations, publishing in 1825. Their explanations were only transitional, being picked up and broadened by Michael Faraday. The phenomena are now part of the theory of eddy currents, and Babbage and Herschel missed some of the clues to unification of electromagnetic theory, staying close to Ampère's force law.

Babbage purchased the actuarial tables of George Barrett, who died in 1821 leaving unpublished work, and surveyed the field in 1826 in Comparative View of the Various Institutions for the Assurance of Lives. This interest followed a project to set up an insurance company, prompted by Francis Baily and mooted in 1824, but not carried out. Babbage did calculate actuarial tables for that scheme, using Equitable Society mortality data from 1762 onwards.

During this whole period, Babbage depended awkwardly on his father's support, given his father's attitude to his early marriage, of 1814: he and Edward Ryan wedded the Whitmore sisters. He made a home in Marylebone in London and established a large family. On his father's death in 1827, Babbage inherited a large estate (value around £100,000, equivalent to £9.14 million or $12.5 million today), making him independently wealthy. After his wife's death in the same year he spent time travelling. In Italy he met Leopold II, Grand Duke of Tuscany, foreshadowing a later visit to Piedmont. In April 1828 he was in Rome, and relying on Herschel to manage the difference engine project, when he heard that he had become a professor at Cambridge, a position he had three times failed to obtain (in 1820, 1823 and 1826).

=== Royal Astronomical Society ===
Babbage was instrumental in founding the Royal Astronomical Society in 1820, initially known as the Astronomical Society of London. Its original aims were to reduce astronomical calculations to a more standard form, and to circulate data. These directions were closely connected with Babbage's ideas on computation, and in 1824 he won its Gold Medal, cited "for his invention of an engine for calculating mathematical and astronomical tables".

Babbage's motivation to overcome errors in tables by mechanisation had been a commonplace since Dionysius Lardner wrote about it in 1834 in the Edinburgh Review (under Babbage's guidance). The context of these developments is still debated. Babbage's own account of the origin of the difference engine begins with the Astronomical Society's wish to improve The Nautical Almanac. Babbage and Herschel were asked to oversee a trial project, to recalculate some part of those tables. With the results to hand, discrepancies were found. This was in 1821 or 1822, and was the occasion on which Babbage formulated his idea for mechanical computation. The issue of the Nautical Almanac is now described as a legacy of a polarisation in British science caused by attitudes to Sir Joseph Banks, who had died in 1820.

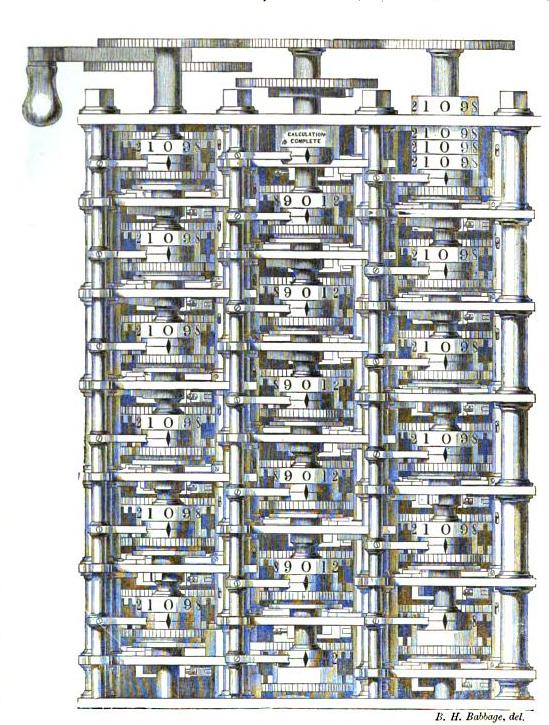
A portion of the difference engine

Babbage studied the requirements to establish a modern postal system, with his friend Thomas Frederick Colby, concluding there should be a uniform rate that was put into effect with the introduction of the Uniform Fourpenny Post supplanted by the Uniform Penny Post in 1839 and 1840. Colby was another of the founding group of the Society. He was also in charge of the Survey of Ireland. Herschel and Babbage were present at a celebrated operation of that survey, the remeasuring of the Lough Foyle baseline.

=== British Lagrangian School ===
The Analytical Society had initially been no more than an undergraduate provocation. During this period it had some more substantial achievements. In 1816, Babbage, Herschel and Peacock published a translation from French of the lectures of Sylvestre Lacroix, which was then the state-of-the-art calculus textbook.

Reference to Lagrange in calculus terms marks out the application of what are now called formal power series. British mathematicians had used them from about 1730 to 1760. As re-introduced, they were not simply applied as notations in differential calculus. They opened up the fields of functional equations (including the difference equations fundamental to the difference engine) and operator (D-module) methods for differential equations. The analogy of difference and differential equations was notationally changing Δ to D, as a "finite" difference becomes "infinitesimal". These symbolic directions became popular, as operational calculus, and pushed to the point of diminishing returns. The Cauchy concept of limit was kept at bay. Woodhouse had already founded this second "British Lagrangian School" with its treatment of Taylor series as formal.

In this context function composition is complicated to express, because the chain rule is not simply applied to second and higher derivatives. This matter was known to Woodhouse by 1803, who took from Louis François Antoine Arbogast what is now called Faà di Bruno's formula. In essence it was known to Abraham De Moivre (1697). Herschel found the method impressive, Babbage knew of it, and it was later noted by Ada Lovelace as compatible with the analytical engine. In the period to 1820 Babbage worked intensively on functional equations in general, and resisted both conventional finite differences and Arbogast's approach (in which Δ and D were related by the simple additive case of the exponential map). But via Herschel he was influenced by Arbogast's ideas in the matter of iteration, i.e. composing a function with itself, possibly many times. Writing in a major paper on functional equations in the Philosophical Transactions (1815/6), Babbage said his starting point was work of Gaspard Monge.

== Academic ==
From 1828 to 1839, Babbage was Lucasian Professor of Mathematics at Cambridge. Not a conventional resident don, and inattentive to his teaching responsibilities, he wrote three topical books during this period of his life. He was elected a Foreign Honorary Member of the American Academy of Arts and Sciences in 1832. Babbage was out of sympathy with colleagues: George Biddell Airy, his predecessor as Lucasian Professor of Mathematics at Trinity College, Cambridge, thought an issue should be made of his lack of interest in lecturing. Babbage planned to lecture in 1831 on political economy. Babbage's reforming direction looked to see university education more inclusive, universities doing more for research, a broader syllabus and more interest in applications; but William Whewell found the programme unacceptable. A controversy Babbage had with Richard Jones lasted for six years. He never did give a lecture.

It was during this period that Babbage tried to enter politics. Simon Schaffer writes that his views of the 1830s included disestablishment of the Church of England, a broader political franchise, and inclusion of manufacturers as stakeholders. He twice stood for Parliament as a candidate for the borough of Finsbury. In 1832 he came in third among five candidates, missing out by some 500 votes in the two-member constituency when two other reformist candidates, Thomas Wakley and Christopher Temple, split the vote. In his memoirs Babbage related how this election brought him the friendship of Samuel Rogers: his brother Henry Rogers wished to support Babbage again, but died within days. In 1834 Babbage finished last among four. In 1832, Babbage, Herschel and Ivory were appointed Knights of the Royal Guelphic Order, however they were not subsequently made knights bachelor to entitle them to the prefix Sir, which often came with appointments to that foreign order (though Herschel was later created a baronet).

=== "Declinarians", learned societies and the BAAS ===
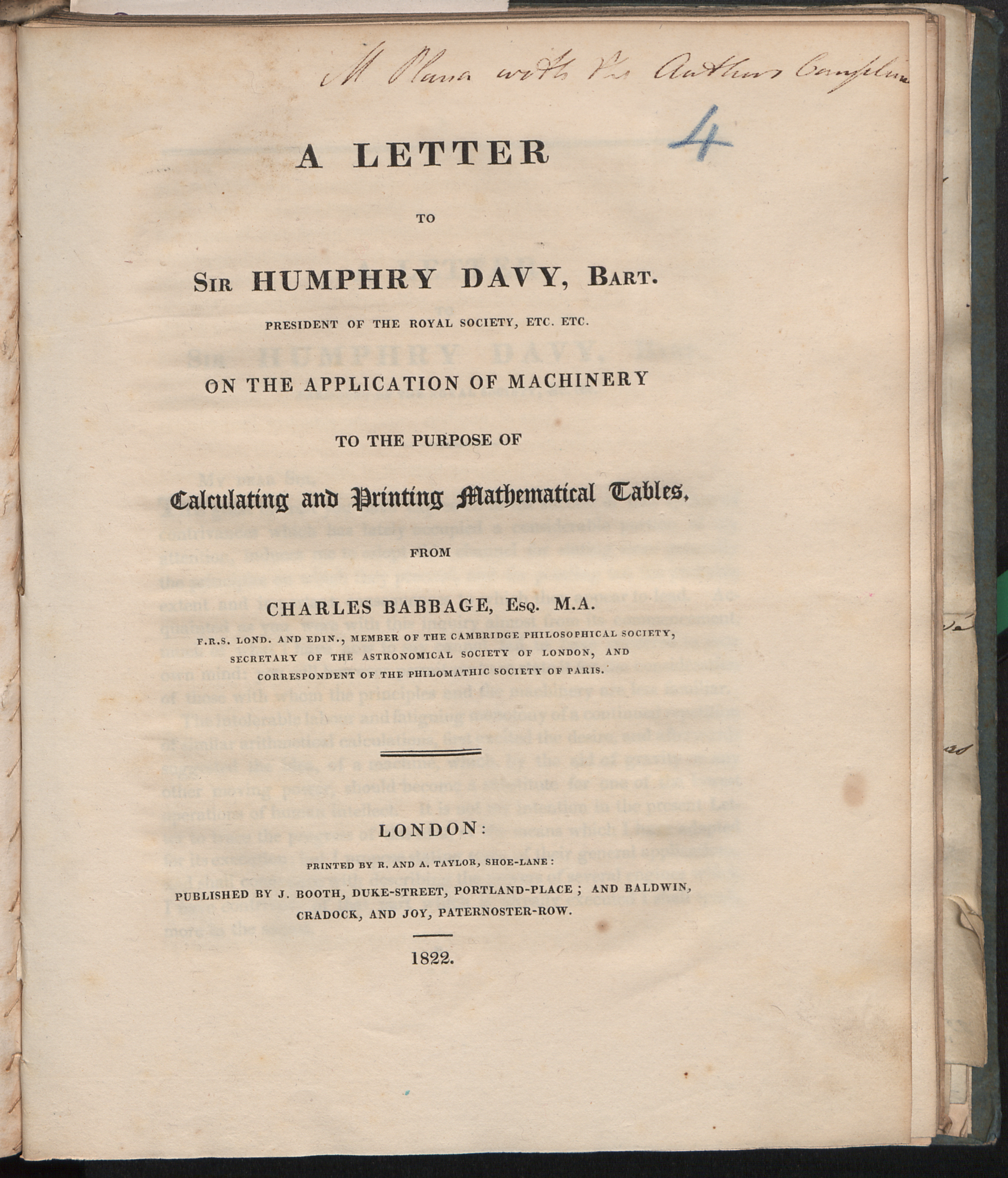
Letter to Sir Humphry Davy, 1822

Babbage now emerged as a polemicist. One of his biographers notes that all his books contain a "campaigning element". His Reflections on the Decline of Science and some of its Causes (1830) stands out, however, for its sharp attacks. It aimed to improve British science, and more particularly to oust Davies Gilbert as President of the Royal Society, which Babbage wished to reform. It was written out of pique, when Babbage hoped to become the junior secretary of the Royal Society, as Herschel was the senior, but failed because of his antagonism to Humphry Davy. Michael Faraday had a reply written, by Gerrit Moll, as On the Alleged Decline of Science in England (1831). On the front of the Royal Society Babbage had no impact, with the bland election of the Duke of Sussex to succeed Gilbert the same year. As a broad manifesto, on the other hand, his Decline led promptly to the formation in 1831 of the British Association for the Advancement of Science (BAAS).

The Mechanics' Magazine in 1831 identified as Declinarians the followers of Babbage. In an unsympathetic tone it pointed out David Brewster writing in the Quarterly Review as another leader; with the barb that both Babbage and Brewster had received public money.

In the debate of the period on statistics (qua data collection) and what is now statistical inference, the BAAS in its Statistical Section (which owed something also to Whewell) opted for data collection. This Section was the sixth, established in 1833 with Babbage as chairman and John Elliot Drinkwater as secretary. The foundation of the Statistical Society followed. Babbage was its public face, backed by Richard Jones and Robert Malthus.

=== On the Economy of Machinery and Manufactures ===
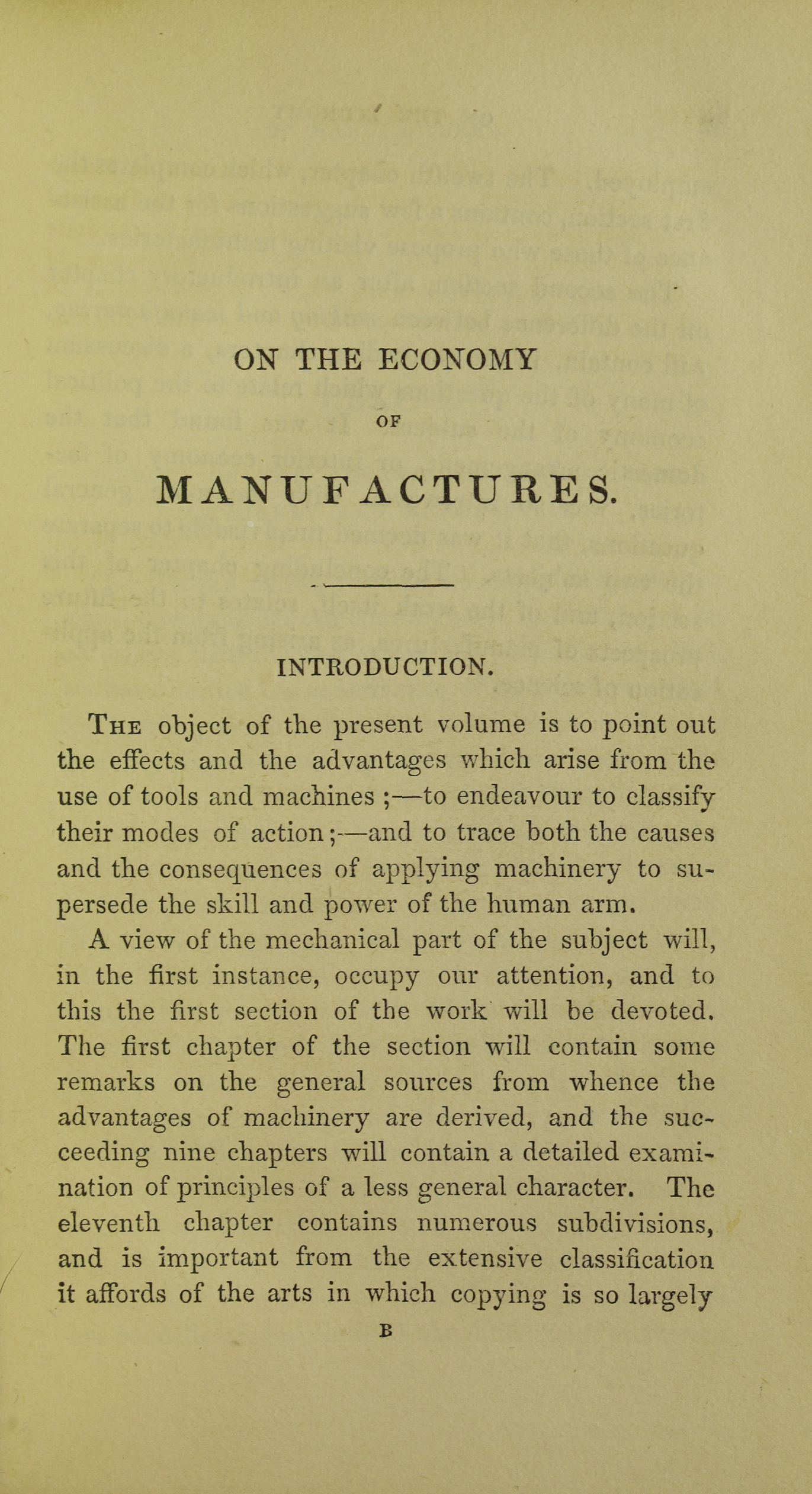
On the Economy of Machinery and Manufactures, 1835

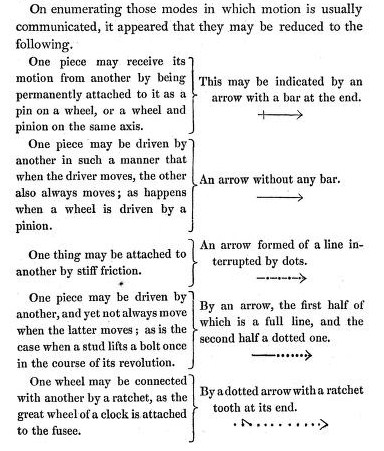
Babbage's notation for machine parts, explanation from On a method of expressing by signs the action of machinery (1827) of his "Mechanical Notation", invented for his own use in understanding the work on the difference engine, and an influence on the conception of the analytical engine

Babbage published On the Economy of Machinery and Manufactures (1832), on the organisation of industrial production. It was an influential early work of operational research. John Rennie the Younger in addressing the Institution of Civil Engineers on manufacturing in 1846 mentioned mostly surveys in encyclopaedias, and Babbage's book was first an article in the Encyclopædia Metropolitana, the form in which Rennie noted it, in the company of related works by John Farey Jr., Peter Barlow and Andrew Ure. From An essay on the general principles which regulate the application of machinery to manufactures and the mechanical arts (1827), which became the Encyclopædia Metropolitana article of 1829, Babbage developed the schematic classification of machines that, combined with discussion of factories, made up the first part of the book. The second part considered the "domestic and political economy" of manufactures.

The book sold well, and quickly went to a fourth edition (1836). Babbage represented his work as largely a result of actual observations in factories, British and abroad. It was not, in its first edition, intended to address deeper questions of political economy; the second (late 1832) did, with three further chapters including one on piece rate. The book also contained ideas on rational design in factories, and profit sharing.

==== "Babbage principle" ====
In Economy of Machinery was described what is now called the "Babbage principle". It pointed out commercial advantages available with more careful division of labour. As Babbage himself noted, it had already appeared in the work of Melchiorre Gioia in 1815. The term was introduced in 1974 by Harry Braverman. Related formulations are the "principle of multiples" of Philip Sargant Florence, and the "balance of processes".

What Babbage remarked is that skilled workers typically spend parts of their time performing tasks that are below their skill level. If the labour process can be divided among several workers, labour costs may be cut by assigning only high-skill tasks to high-cost workers, restricting other tasks to lower-paid workers. He also pointed out that training or apprenticeship can be taken as fixed costs; but that returns to scale are available by his approach of standardisation of tasks, therefore again favouring the factory system. His view of human capital was restricted to minimising the time period for recovery of training costs.

==== Publishing ====
Another aspect of the work was its detailed breakdown of the cost structure of book publishing. Babbage took the unpopular line, from the publishers' perspective, of exposing the trade's profitability. He went as far as to name the organisers of the trade's restrictive practices. Twenty years later he attended a meeting hosted by John Chapman to campaign against the Booksellers Association, still a cartel.

==== Influence ====
It has been written that "what Arthur Young was to agriculture, Charles Babbage was to the factory visit and machinery". Babbage's theories are said to have influenced the layout of the 1851 Great Exhibition, and his views had a strong effect on his contemporary George Julius Poulett Scrope. Karl Marx argued that the source of the productivity of the factory system was exactly the combination of the division of labour with machinery, building on Adam Smith, Babbage and Ure. Where Marx picked up on Babbage and disagreed with Smith was on the motivation for division of labour by the manufacturer: as Babbage did, he wrote that it was for the sake of profitability, rather than productivity, and identified an impact on the concept of a trade.

John Ruskin went further, to oppose completely what manufacturing in Babbage's sense stood for. Babbage also affected the economic thinking of John Stuart Mill. George Holyoake saw Babbage's detailed discussion of profit sharing as substantive, in the tradition of Robert Owen and Charles Fourier, if requiring the attentions of a benevolent captain of industry, and ignored at the time.

Charles Babbage's Saturday night soirées, held from 1828 into the 1840s, were important gathering places for prominent scientists, authors and aristocracy. Babbage is credited with importing the "scientific soirée" from France with his well-attended Saturday evening soirées.

Works by Babbage and Ure were published in French translation in 1830; On the Economy of Machinery was translated in 1833 into French by Édouard Biot, and into German the same year by Gottfried Friedenberg. The French engineer and writer on industrial organisation Léon Lalanne was influenced by Babbage, but also by the economist Claude Lucien Bergery, in reducing the issues to "technology". William Jevons connected Babbage's "economy of labour" with his own labour experiments of 1870. The Babbage principle is an inherent assumption in Frederick Winslow Taylor's scientific management.

Mary Everest Boole claimed that there was profound influence – via her uncle George Everest – of Indian thought in general and Indian logic, in particular, on Babbage and on her husband George Boole, as well as on Augustus De Morgan:

Think what must have been the effect of the intense Hinduizing of three such men as Babbage, De Morgan, and George Boole on the mathematical atmosphere of 1830–65. What share had it in generating the Vector Analysis and the mathematics by which investigations in physical science are now conducted?

=== Natural theology ===
In 1837, responding to the series of eight Bridgewater Treatises, Babbage published his Ninth Bridgewater Treatise, under the title On the Power, Wisdom and Goodness of God, as manifested in the Creation. In this work Babbage weighed in on the side of uniformitarianism in a current debate. He preferred the conception of creation in which a God-given natural law dominated, removing the need for continuous "contrivance".

The book is a work of natural theology, and incorporates extracts from related correspondence of Herschel with Charles Lyell. Babbage put forward the thesis that God had the omnipotence and foresight to create as a divine legislator. In this book, Babbage dealt with relating interpretations between science and religion; on the one hand, he insisted that "there exists no fatal collision between the words of Scripture and the facts of nature;" on the other hand, he wrote that the Book of Genesis was not meant to be read literally in relation to scientific terms. Against those who said these were in conflict, he wrote "that the contradiction they have imagined can have no real existence, and that whilst the testimony of Moses remains unimpeached, we may also be permitted to confide in the testimony of our senses."

The Ninth Bridgewater Treatise was quoted extensively in Vestiges of the Natural History of Creation. The parallel with Babbage's computing machines is made explicit, as allowing plausibility to the theory that transmutation of species could be pre-programmed.

It was in The Ninth Bridgewater Treatise where Babbage proposed his 'library in the air' concept, where every breath, word and motion was imprinted at the atomic level in a record that could be accessed after the events occurred.

The air itself is one vast library on whose pages are for ever written all that man has ever said or woman whispered.

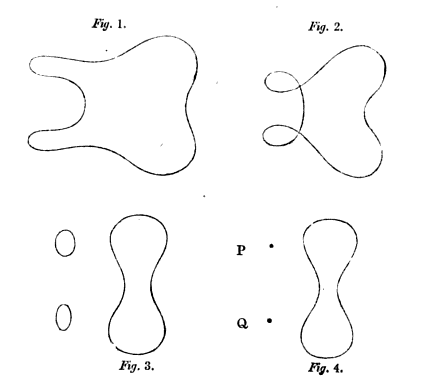
Plate from the Ninth Bridgewater Treatise, showing a parametric family of algebraic curves acquiring isolated real points

Jonar Ganeri, author of Indian Logic, believes Babbage may have been influenced by Indian thought; one possible route would be through Henry Thomas Colebrooke. Mary Everest Boole argues that Babbage was introduced to Indian thought in the 1820s by her uncle George Everest:

Some time about 1825, [Everest] came to England for two or three years, and made a fast and lifelong friendship with Herschel and with Babbage, who was then quite young. I would ask any fair-minded mathematician to read Babbage's Ninth Bridgewater Treatise and compare it with the works of his contemporaries in England; and then ask himself whence came the peculiar conception of the nature of miracle which underlies Babbage's ideas of Singular Points on Curves (Chap, viii) – from European Theology or Hindu Metaphysic? Oh! how the English clergy of that day hated Babbage's book!

=== Religious views ===
Babbage was raised in the Protestant form of the Christian faith, his family having inculcated in him an orthodox form of worship. He explained:

My excellent mother taught me the usual forms of my daily and nightly prayer; and neither in my father nor my mother was there any mixture of bigotry and intolerance on the one hand, nor on the other of that unbecoming and familiar mode of addressing the Almighty which afterwards so much disgusted me in my youthful years.

Rejecting the Athanasian Creed as a "direct contradiction in terms", in his youth he looked to Samuel Clarke's works on religion, of which Being and Attributes of God (1704) exerted a particularly strong influence on him. Later in life, Babbage concluded that "the true value of the Christian religion rested, not on speculative [theology] ... but ... upon those doctrines of kindness and benevolence which that religion claims and enforces, not merely in favour of man himself but of every creature susceptible of pain or of happiness."

In his autobiography Passages from the Life of a Philosopher (1864), Babbage wrote a whole chapter on the topic of religion, where he identified three sources of divine knowledge:

1. A priori or mystical experience
2. From Revelation
3. From the examination of the works of the Creator

He stated, on the basis of the design argument, that studying the works of nature had been the more appealing evidence, and the one which led him to actively profess the existence of God. Advocating for natural theology, he wrote:

In the works of the Creator ever open to our examination, we possess a firm basis on which to raise the superstructure of an enlightened creed. The more man inquires into the laws which regulate the material universe, the more he is convinced that all its varied forms arise from the action of a few simple principles ... The works of the Creator, ever present to our senses, give a living and perpetual testimony of his power and goodness far surpassing any evidence transmitted through human testimony. The testimony of man becomes fainter at every stage of transmission, whilst each new inquiry into the works of the Almighty gives to us more exalted views of his wisdom, his goodness, and his power.

Like Samuel Vince, Babbage also wrote a defence of the belief in divine miracles. Against objections previously posed by David Hume, Babbage advocated for the belief of divine agency, stating "we must not measure the credibility or incredibility of an event by the narrow sphere of our own experience, nor forget that there is a Divine energy which overrides what we familiarly call the laws of nature." He alluded to the limits of human experience, expressing: "all that we see in a miracle is an effect which is new to our observation, and whose cause is concealed. The cause may be beyond the sphere of our observation, and would be thus beyond the familiar sphere of nature; but this does not make the event a violation of any law of nature. The limits of man's observation lie within very narrow boundaries, and it would be arrogance to suppose that the reach of man's power is to form the limits of the natural world."

== Later life ==
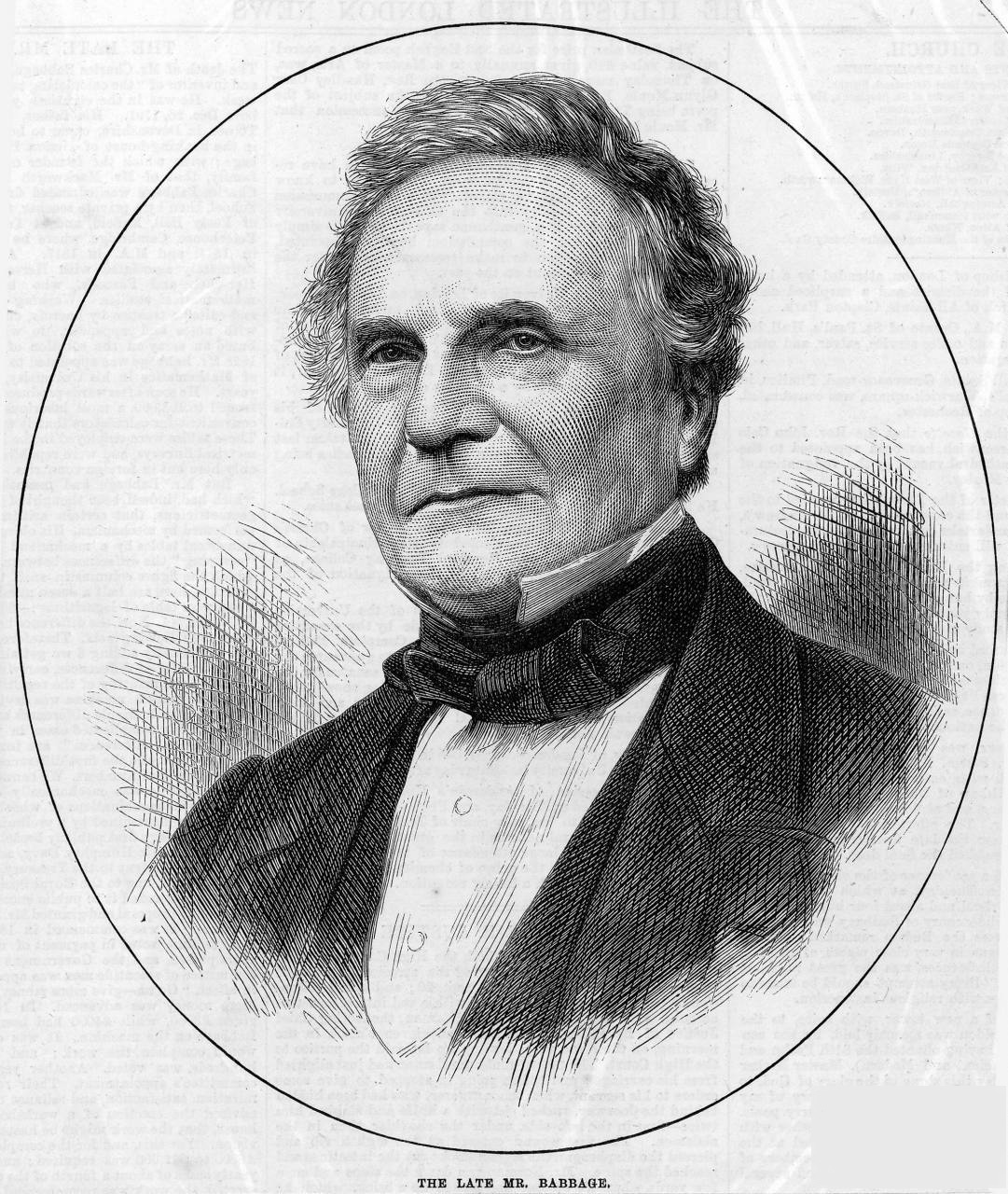
The Illustrated London News (4 November 1871)

The British Association was consciously modelled on the Deutsche Naturforscher-Versammlung, founded in 1822. It rejected romantic science as well as metaphysics, and started to entrench the divisions of science from literature, and professionals from amateurs. Belonging as he did to the "Wattite" faction in the BAAS, represented in particular by James Watt the younger, Babbage identified closely with industrialists. He wanted to go faster in the same directions, and had little time for the more gentlemanly component of its membership. Indeed, he subscribed to a version of conjectural history that placed industrial society as the culmination of human development (and shared this view with Herschel). A clash with Roderick Murchison led in 1838 to his withdrawal from further involvement. At the end of the same year he sent in his resignation as Lucasian professor, walking away also from the Cambridge struggle with Whewell. His interests became more focused, on computation and meteorology, and on international contacts.

=== Metrology programme ===
A project announced by Babbage was to tabulate all physical constants (referred to as "constants of nature", a phrase in itself a neologism), and then to compile an encyclopaedic work of numerical information. He was a pioneer in the field of "absolute measurement". His ideas followed on from those of Johann Christian Poggendorff, and were mentioned to Brewster in 1832. There were to be 19 categories of constants, and Ian Hacking sees these as reflecting in part Babbage's "eccentric enthusiasms". Babbage's paper On Tables of the Constants of Nature and Art was reprinted by the Smithsonian Institution in 1856, with an added note that the physical tables of Arnold Henry Guyot "will form a part of the important work proposed in this article".

Exact measurement was also key to the development of machine tools. Here again Babbage is considered a pioneer, with Henry Maudslay, William Sellers, and Joseph Whitworth.

=== Engineer and inventor ===
Through the Royal Society Babbage acquired the friendship of the engineer Marc Brunel. It was through Brunel that Babbage knew of Joseph Clement, and so came to encounter the artisans whom he observed in his work on manufactures. Babbage provided an introduction for Isambard Kingdom Brunel in 1830, for a contact with the proposed Bristol & Birmingham Railway. He carried out studies, around 1838, to show the superiority of the broad gauge for railways, used by Brunel's Great Western Railway.

In 1838, Babbage invented the pilot (also called a cow-catcher), the metal frame attached to the front of locomotives that clears the tracks of obstacles; he also constructed a dynamometer car. His eldest son, Benjamin Herschel Babbage, worked as an engineer for Brunel on the railways before emigrating to Australia in the 1850s.

Babbage also invented an ophthalmoscope, which he gave to Thomas Wharton Jones for testing. Jones, however, ignored it. The device only came into use after being independently invented by Hermann von Helmholtz.

=== Cryptography ===
Babbage achieved notable results in cryptography, though this was still not known a century after his death. Letter frequency was category 18 of Babbage's tabulation project. Joseph Henry later defended interest in it, in the absence of the facts, as relevant to the management of movable type.

As early as 1845, Babbage had solved a cipher that had been posed as a challenge by his nephew Henry Hollier, and in the process, he made a discovery about ciphers that were based on Vigenère tables. Specifically, he realised that enciphering plain text with a keyword rendered the cipher text subject to modular arithmetic. During the Crimean War of the 1850s, Babbage broke Vigenère's autokey cipher as well as the much weaker cipher that is called Vigenère cipher today. He intended to publish a book The Philosophy of Deciphering, but never did. His discovery was kept a military secret, and was not published. Credit for the result was instead given to Friedrich Kasiski, a Prussian infantry officer, who made the same discovery some years later. However, in 1854, Babbage published the solution of a Vigenère cipher, which had been published previously in the Journal of the Society of Arts. In 1855, Babbage also published a short letter, "Cypher Writing", in the same journal. Nevertheless, his priority was not established until 1985.

=== Public nuisances ===
Babbage involved himself in well-publicised but unpopular campaigns against public nuisances. He once counted all the broken panes of glass of a factory, publishing in 1857 a "Table of the Relative Frequency of the Causes of Breakage of Plate Glass Windows": Of 464 broken panes, 14 were caused by "drunken men, women or boys".

Babbage's distaste for commoners (the Mob) included writing "Observations of Street Nuisances" in 1864, as well as tallying up 165 "nuisances" over a period of 80 days. He especially hated street music, and in particular the music of organ grinders, against whom he railed in various venues. The following quotation is typical:

It is difficult to estimate the misery inflicted upon thousands of persons, and the absolute pecuniary penalty imposed upon multitudes of intellectual workers by the loss of their time, destroyed by organ-grinders and other similar nuisances.

Babbage was not alone in his campaign. A convert to the cause was the MP Michael Thomas Bass.

In the 1860s, Babbage also took up the anti-hoop-rolling campaign. He blamed hoop-rolling boys for driving their iron hoops under horses' legs, with the result that the rider is thrown and very often the horse breaks a leg. Babbage achieved a certain notoriety in this matter, being denounced in debate in Commons in 1864 for "commencing a crusade against the popular game of tip-cat and the trundling of hoops."

== Computing pioneer ==
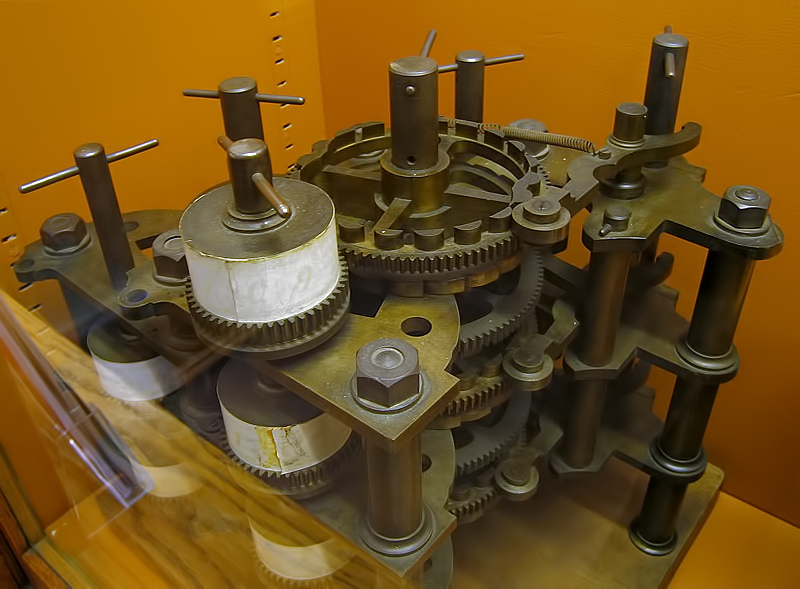
Part of Charles Babbage's Difference Engine (#1), assembled after his death by his son, Henry Prevost Babbage (1824–1918), using parts found in Charles' laboratory. Whipple Museum of the History of Science, Cambridge, England.

Babbage's machines were among the first mechanical computers. That they were not actually completed was largely because of funding problems and clashes of personality, most notably with George Biddell Airy, the Astronomer Royal.

Babbage directed the building of some steam-powered machines that achieved some modest success, suggesting that calculations could be mechanised. For more than ten years he received government funding for his project, which amounted to £17,000, but eventually the Treasury lost confidence in him.

While Babbage's machines were mechanical and unwieldy, their basic architecture was similar to that of a modern computer. The data and program memory were separated, operation was instruction-based, the control unit could make conditional jumps, and the machine had a separate I/O unit.

=== Background on mathematical tables ===
In Babbage's time, printed mathematical tables were calculated by human computers; in other words, by hand. They were central to navigation, science and engineering, as well as mathematics. Mistakes were known to occur in transcription as well as calculation.

At Cambridge, Babbage saw the fallibility of this process, and the opportunity of adding mechanisation into its management. His own account of his path towards mechanical computation references a particular occasion:

In 1812 he was sitting in his rooms in the Analytical Society looking at a table of logarithms, which he knew to be full of mistakes, when the idea occurred to him of computing all tabular functions by machinery. The French government had produced several tables by a new method. Three or four of their mathematicians decided how to compute the tables, half a dozen more broke down the operations into simple stages, and the work itself, which was restricted to addition and subtraction, was done by eighty computers who knew only these two arithmetical processes. Here, for the first time, mass production was applied to arithmetic, and Babbage was seized by the idea that the labours of the unskilled computers [people] could be taken over completely by machinery which would be quicker and more reliable.

There was another period, seven years later, when his interest was aroused by the issues around computation of mathematical tables. The French official initiative by Gaspard de Prony, and its problems of implementation, were familiar to him. After the Napoleonic Wars came to a close, scientific contacts were renewed on the level of personal contact: in 1819 Charles Blagden was in Paris looking into the printing of the stalled de Prony project, and lobbying for the support of the Royal Society. In works of the 1820s and 1830s, Babbage referred in detail to de Prony's project.

=== Difference engine ===
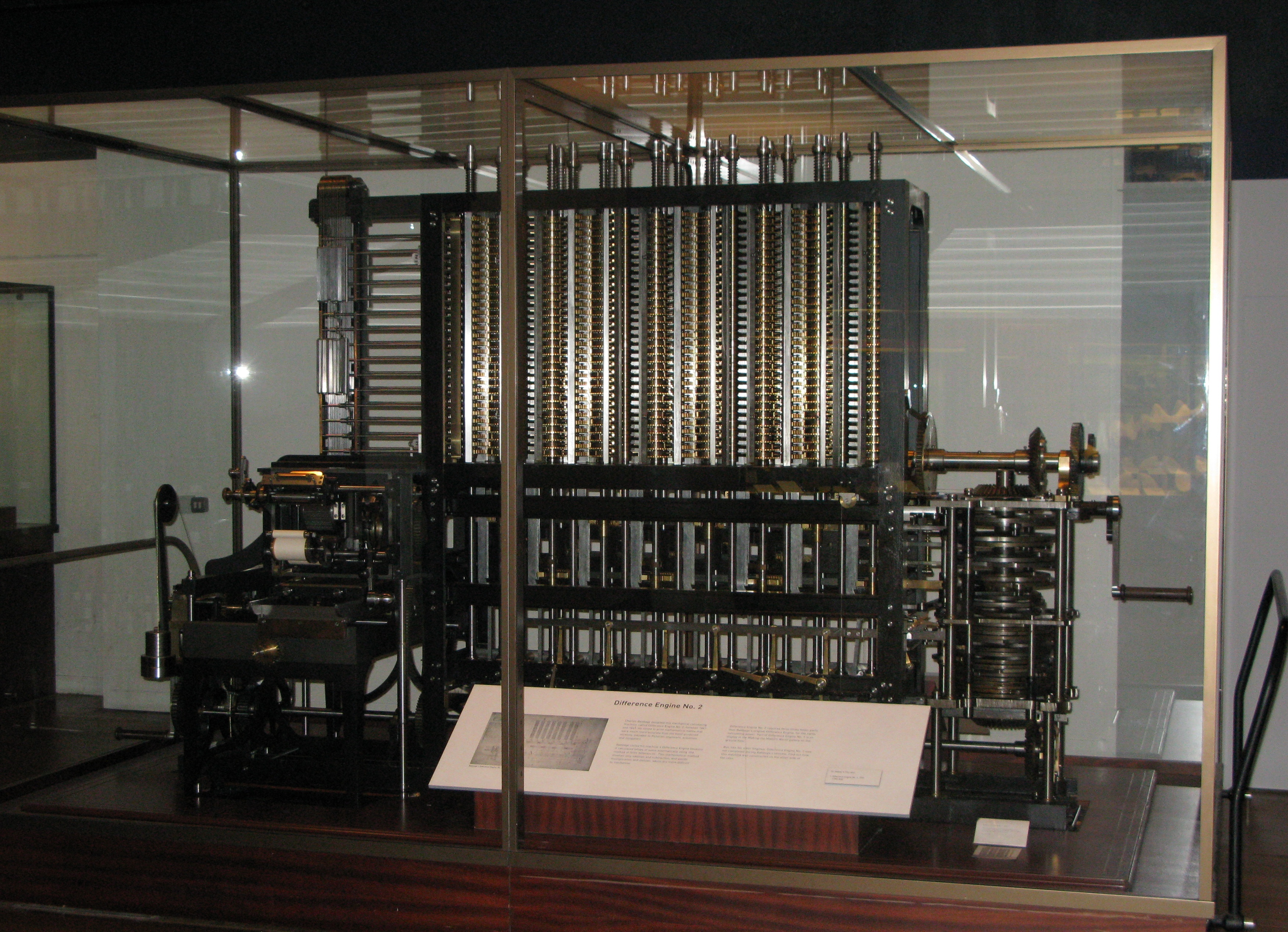
The Science Museum's Difference Engine No. 2, built from Babbage's design

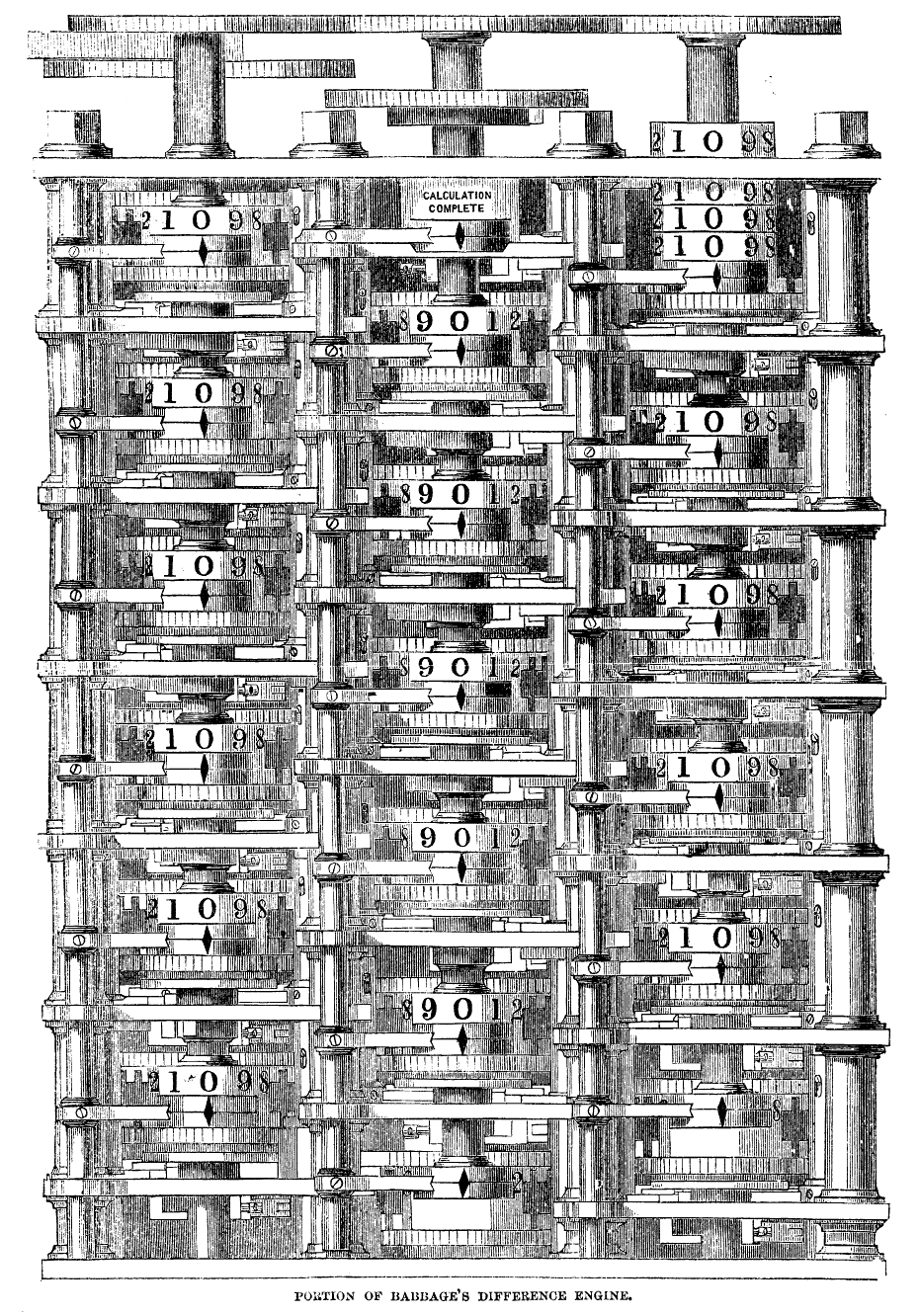
Portion of Babbage's difference engine

Babbage began in 1822 with what he called the difference engine, made to compute values of polynomial functions. It was created to calculate a series of values automatically. By using the method of finite differences, it was possible to avoid the need for multiplication and division.

For a prototype difference engine, Babbage brought in Joseph Clement to implement the design, in 1823. Clement worked to high standards, but his machine tools were particularly elaborate. Under the standard terms of business of the time, he could charge for their construction, and would also own them. He and Babbage fell out over costs around 1831.

Some parts of the prototype survive in the Museum of the History of Science, Oxford. This prototype evolved into the "first difference engine". It remained unfinished and the finished portion is located at the Science Museum in London. This first difference engine would have been composed of around 25,000 parts, weighed fifteen short tons (13,600 kg), and would have been 8 ft (2.4 m) tall. Although Babbage received ample funding for the project, it was never completed. He later (1847–1849) produced detailed drawings for an improved version,"Difference Engine No. 2", but did not receive funding from the British government. His design was finally constructed in 1989–1991, using his plans and 19th-century manufacturing tolerances. It performed its first calculation at the Science Museum, London, returning results to 31 digits.

Nine years later, in 2000, the Science Museum completed the printer Babbage had designed for the difference engine. His printers were the first computer printers invented.

==== Completed models ====
The Science Museum has constructed two Difference Engines according to Babbage's plans for the Difference Engine No 2. One is owned by the museum. The other, owned by the technology multimillionaire Nathan Myhrvold, went on exhibition at the Computer History Museum in Mountain View, California on 10 May 2008. The two models that have been constructed are not replicas.

=== Analytical Engine ===
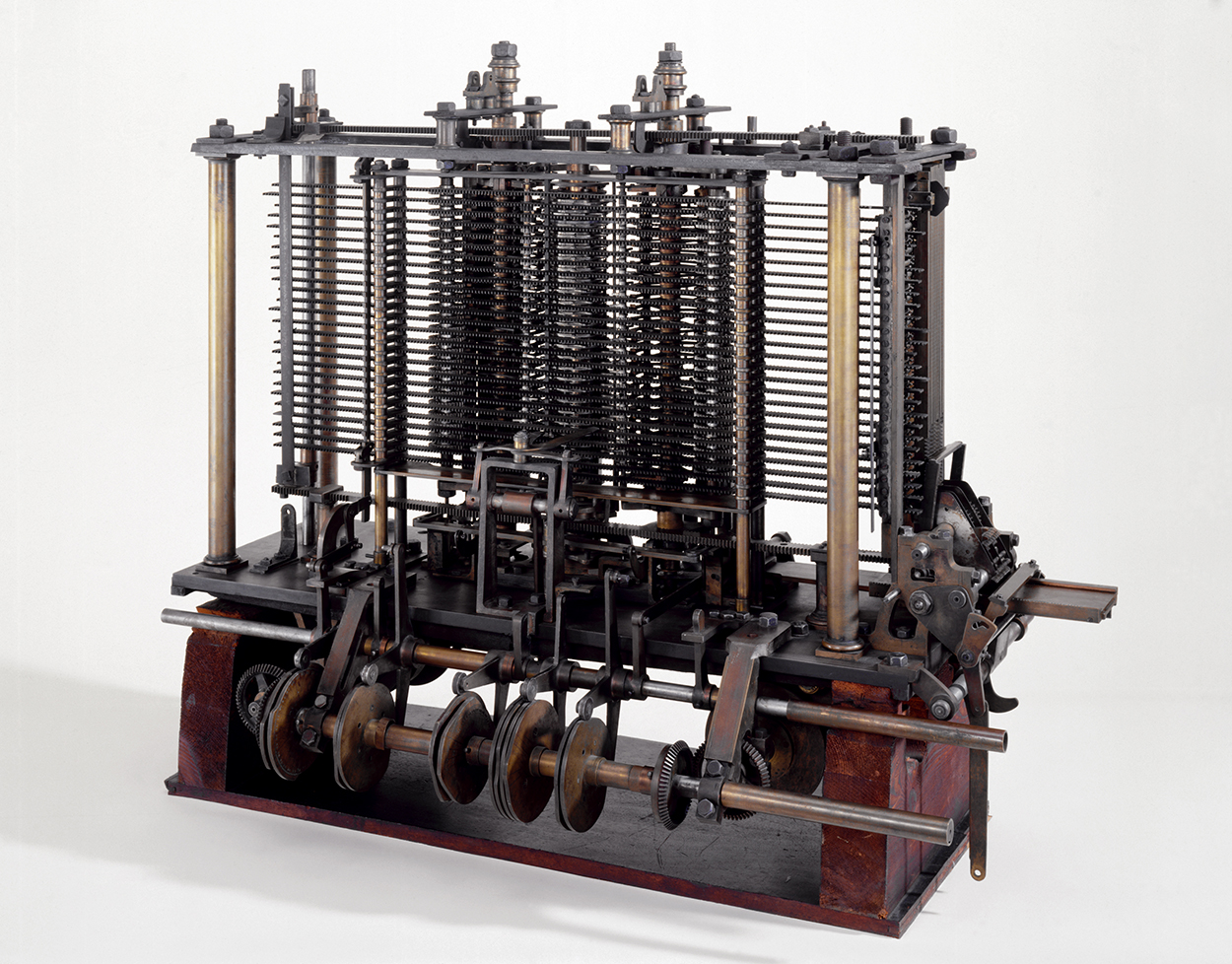
Portion of the mill with a printing mechanism of the Analytical Engine, built by Charles Babbage, as displayed at the Science Museum (London)

After the attempt at making the first difference engine fell through, Babbage worked to design a more complex machine called the Analytical Engine. He hired C. G. Jarvis, who had previously worked for Clement as a draughtsman. The Analytical Engine marks the transition from mechanised arithmetic to fully-fledged general purpose computation. It is largely on it that Babbage's standing as computer pioneer rests.

The major innovation was that the Analytical Engine was to be programmed using punched cards: the Engine was intended to use loops of Jacquard's punched cards to control a mechanical calculator, which could use as input the results of preceding computations. The machine was also intended to employ several features subsequently used in modern computers, including sequential control, branching and looping. It would have been the first mechanical device to be, in principle, Turing-complete. Charles Babbage wrote a series of programs for the Analytical Engine from 1837 to 1840. The first program was finished in 1837. The Engine was not a single physical machine, but rather a succession of designs that Babbage tinkered with until his death in 1871.

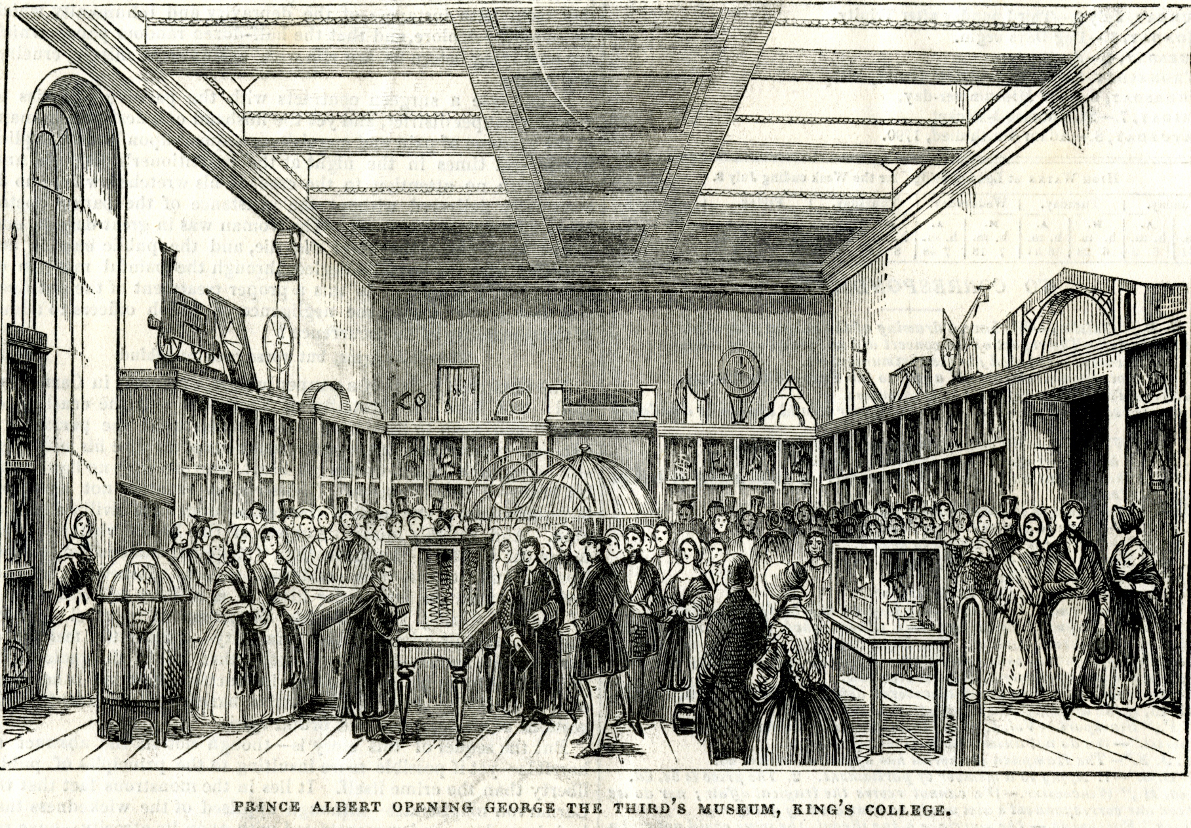
Part of the Analytical Engine on display, in 1843, left of centre in this engraving of the King George III Museum in King's College, London

=== Ada Lovelace and Italian followers ===
Ada Lovelace, who corresponded with Babbage during his development of the Analytical Engine, is credited with developing an algorithm that would enable the Engine to calculate a sequence of Bernoulli numbers. Despite documentary evidence in Lovelace's own handwriting, some scholars dispute to what extent the ideas were Lovelace's own. For this achievement, she is often described as the first computer programmer; though no programming language had yet been invented.

Lovelace also translated and wrote literature supporting the project. Describing the engine's programming by punch cards, she wrote: "We may say most aptly that the Analytical Engine weaves algebraical patterns just as the Jacquard loom weaves flowers and leaves."

Babbage visited Turin in 1840 at the invitation of Giovanni Plana, who had developed in 1831 an analog computing machine that served as a perpetual calendar. Here in 1840 in Turin, Babbage gave the only public explanation and lectures about the Analytical Engine. In 1842 Charles Wheatstone approached Lovelace to translate a paper of Luigi Menabrea, who had taken notes of Babbage's Turin talks; and Babbage asked her to add something of her own. Fortunato Prandi who acted as interpreter in Turin was an Italian exile and follower of Giuseppe Mazzini.

=== Swedish followers ===
Per Georg Scheutz wrote about the difference engine in 1830, and experimented in automated computation. After 1834 and Lardner's Edinburgh Review article he set up a project of his own, doubting whether Babbage's initial plan could be carried out. This he pushed through with his son, Edvard Scheutz. Another Swedish engine was that of Martin Wiberg (1860).

=== Legacy ===
In 2011, researchers in Britain proposed a multimillion-pound project, "Plan 28", to construct Babbage's Analytical Engine. Since Babbage's plans were continually being refined and were never completed, they intended to engage the public in the project and crowd-source the analysis of what should be built. It would have the equivalent of 675 bytes of memory, and run at a clock speed of about 7 Hz. They hoped to complete it by the 150th anniversary of Babbage's death, in 2021.

Advances in MEMS and nanotechnology have led to recent high-tech experiments in mechanical computation. The benefits suggested include operation in high radiation or high temperature environments. These modern versions of mechanical computation were highlighted in The Economist in its special "end of the millennium" black cover issue in an article entitled "Babbage's Last Laugh".

Due to his association with the town Babbage was chosen in 2007 to appear on the 5 Totnes pound note. An image of Babbage features in the British cultural icons section of the newly designed British passport in 2015.

== Family ==
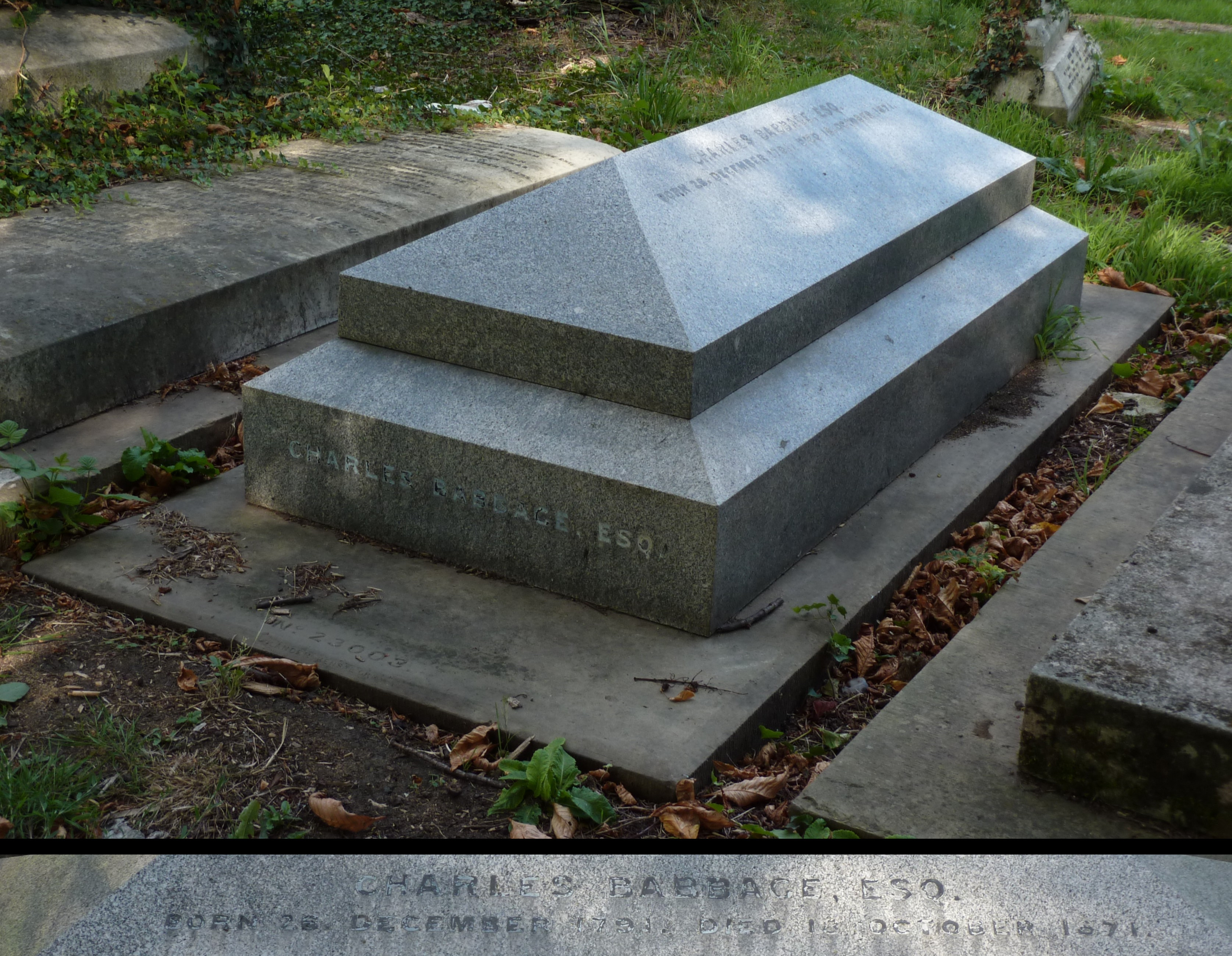
Babbage's grave at Kensal Green Cemetery, London, photographed in 2014

On 25 July 1814, Babbage married Georgiana Whitmore, sister of British parliamentarian William Wolryche-Whitmore, at St. Michael's Church in Teignmouth, Devon. The couple lived at Dudmaston Hall, Shropshire (where Babbage engineered the central heating system), before moving to 5 Devonshire Street, London in 1815.

Charles and Georgiana had eight children, but only four – Benjamin Herschel, Georgiana Whitmore, Dugald Bromhead and Henry Prevost – survived childhood. Charles' wife Georgiana died in Worcester on 1 September 1827, the same year as his father, their second son (also named Charles) and their newborn son Alexander.

- Benjamin Herschel Babbage (1815–1878)
- Charles Whitmore Babbage (1817–1827)
- Georgiana Whitmore Babbage (1818 – 26 September 1834)
- Edward Stewart Babbage (1819–1821)
- Francis Moore Babbage (1821–????)
- Dugald Bromhead (Bromheald?) Babbage (1823–1901)
- (Maj-Gen) Henry Prevost Babbage (1824–1918)
- Alexander Forbes Babbage (1827–1827)

His youngest surviving son, Henry Prevost Babbage (1824–1918), went on to create six small demonstration pieces for Difference Engine No. 1 based on his father's designs, one of which was sent to Harvard University where it was later discovered by Howard H. Aiken, pioneer of the Harvard Mark I. Henry Prevost's 1910 Analytical Engine Mill, previously on display at Dudmaston Hall, is now on display at the Science Museum.

== Death ==
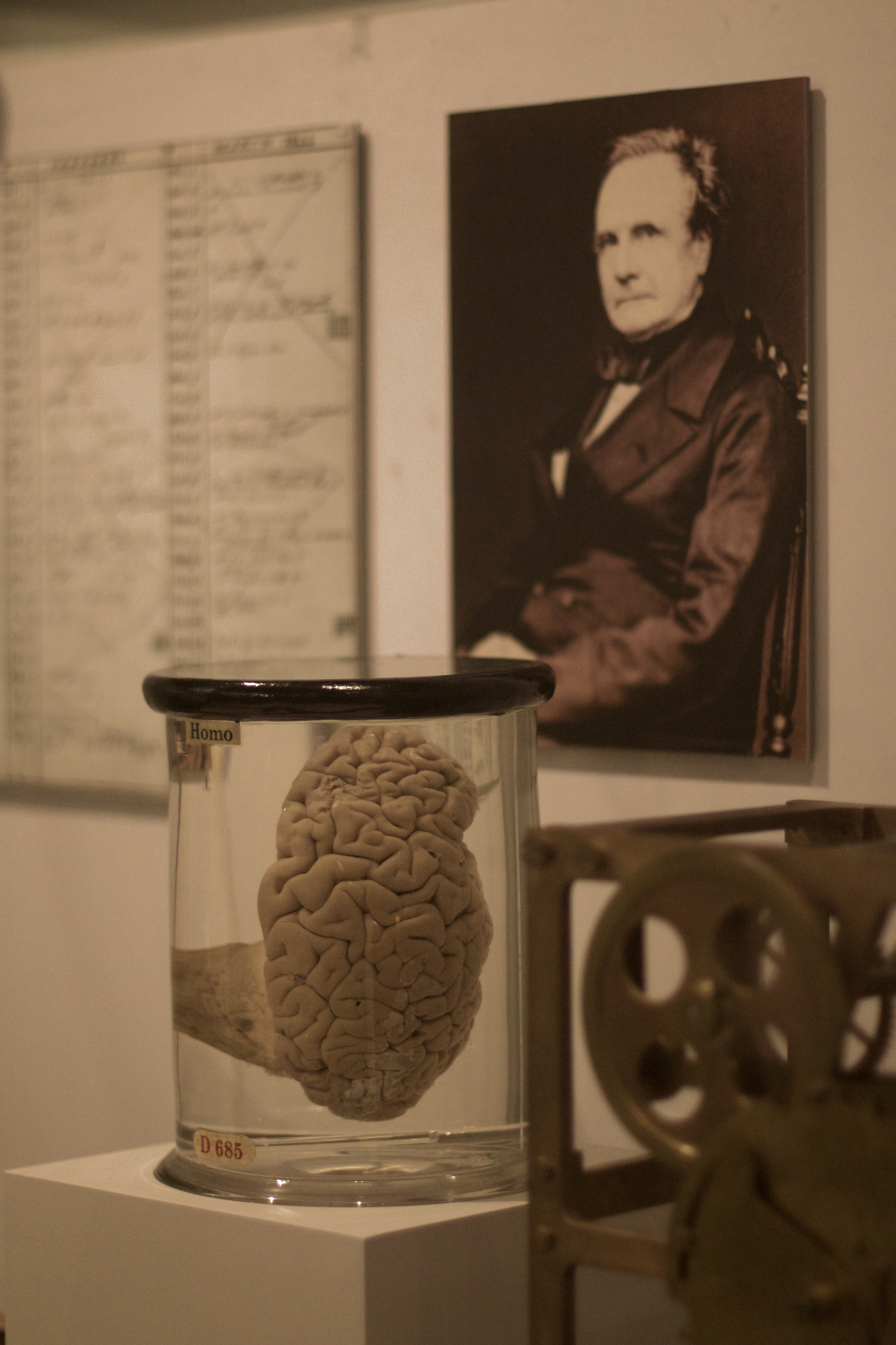
Charles Babbage's brain is on display at The Science Museum.

Babbage lived and worked for over 40 years at 1 Dorset Street, Marylebone, where he died, at the age of 79, on 18 October 1871; he was buried in London's Kensal Green Cemetery. According to Horsley, Babbage died "of renal inadequacy, secondary to cystitis." He had declined both a knighthood and baronetcy. He also argued against hereditary peerages, favouring life peerages instead.

=== Autopsy report ===
In 1983, the autopsy report for Charles Babbage was discovered and later published by his great-great-grandson. A copy of the original is also available. Half of Babbage's brain is preserved at the Hunterian Museum in London. The other half of Babbage's brain is on display in the Science Museum, London.

== Memorials ==
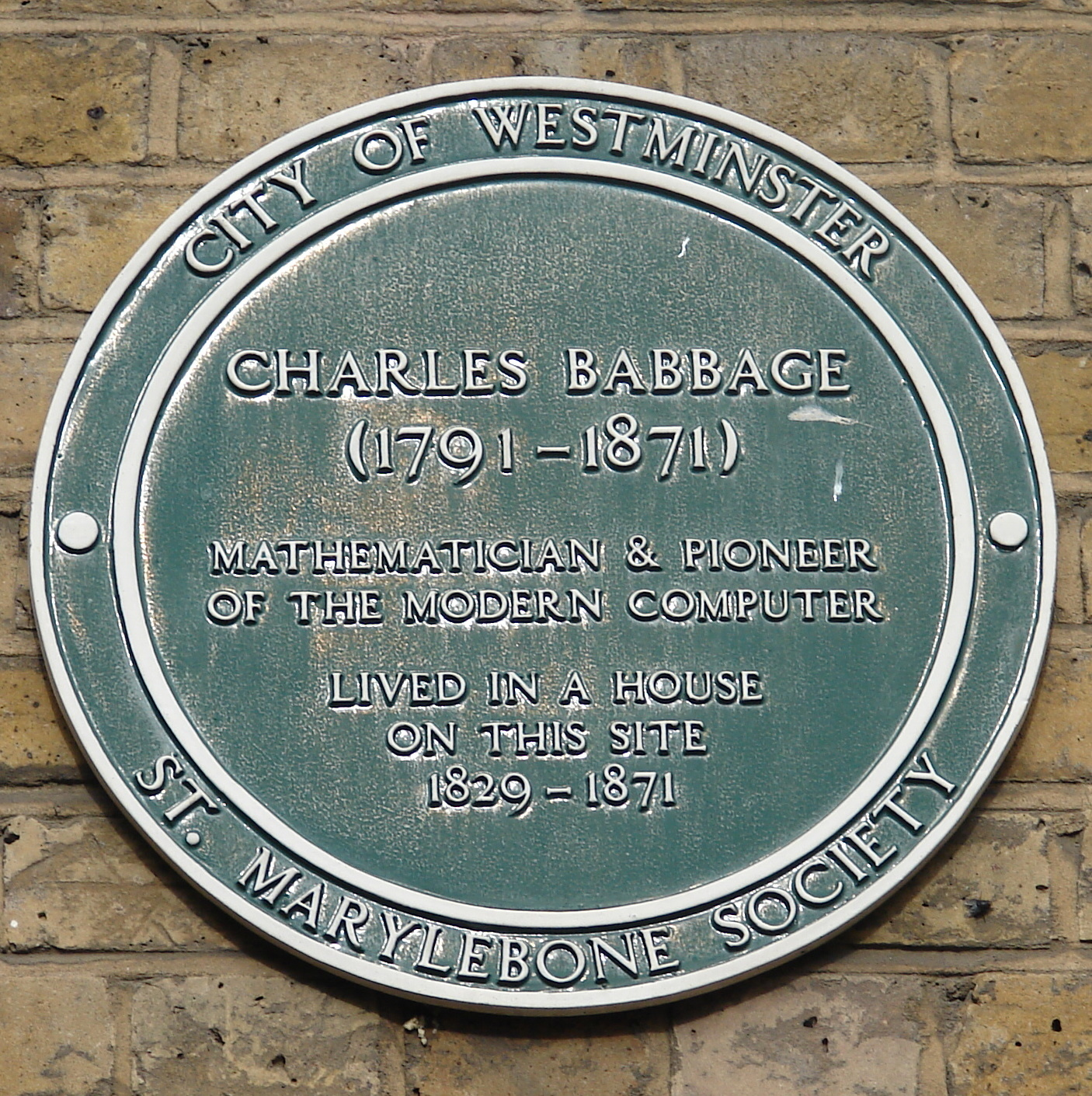
Green plaque in London

There is a black plaque commemorating the 40 years Babbage spent at 1 Dorset Street, London. Locations, institutions and other things named after Babbage include:

- The Moon crater, Babbage
- The Charles Babbage Institute, an information technology archive and research center at the University of Minnesota
- Babbage River Falls, Yukon, Canada
- The Charles Babbage Premium, an annual computing award
- British Rail named a locomotive after Charles Babbage in the 1990s.
- Babbage Island, Western Australia
- The Babbage Building at the University of Plymouth, where the university's school of computing is based
- The Babbage programming language for GEC 4000 series minicomputers
- "Babbage", The Economist's Science and Technology blog
- The former chain retail computer and video-games store "Babbage's" (now GameStop) was named after him.

== In fiction and film ==
Babbage frequently appears in steampunk works; he has been called an iconic figure of the genre. Other works in which Babbage appears include:

- The 2008 short film Babbage, screened at the 2008 Cannes Film Festival, a 2009 finalist with Haydenfilms, and shown at the 2009 HollyShorts Film Festival and other international film festivals. The film shows Babbage at a dinner party, with guests discussing his life and work.
- Sydney Padua created The Thrilling Adventures of Lovelace and Babbage, a cartoon alternate history in which Babbage and Lovelace succeed in building the Analytical Engine. It quotes heavily from the writings of Lovelace, Babbage and their contemporaries.
- Kate Beaton, cartoonist of webcomic Hark! A Vagrant, devoted one of her comic strips to Charles and Georgiana Babbage.
- The Doctor Who episode "Spyfall, Part 2" (Season 12, episode 2) features Charles Babbage and Ada Gordon as characters who assist the Doctor when she's stuck in the year 1834.

== Publications ==
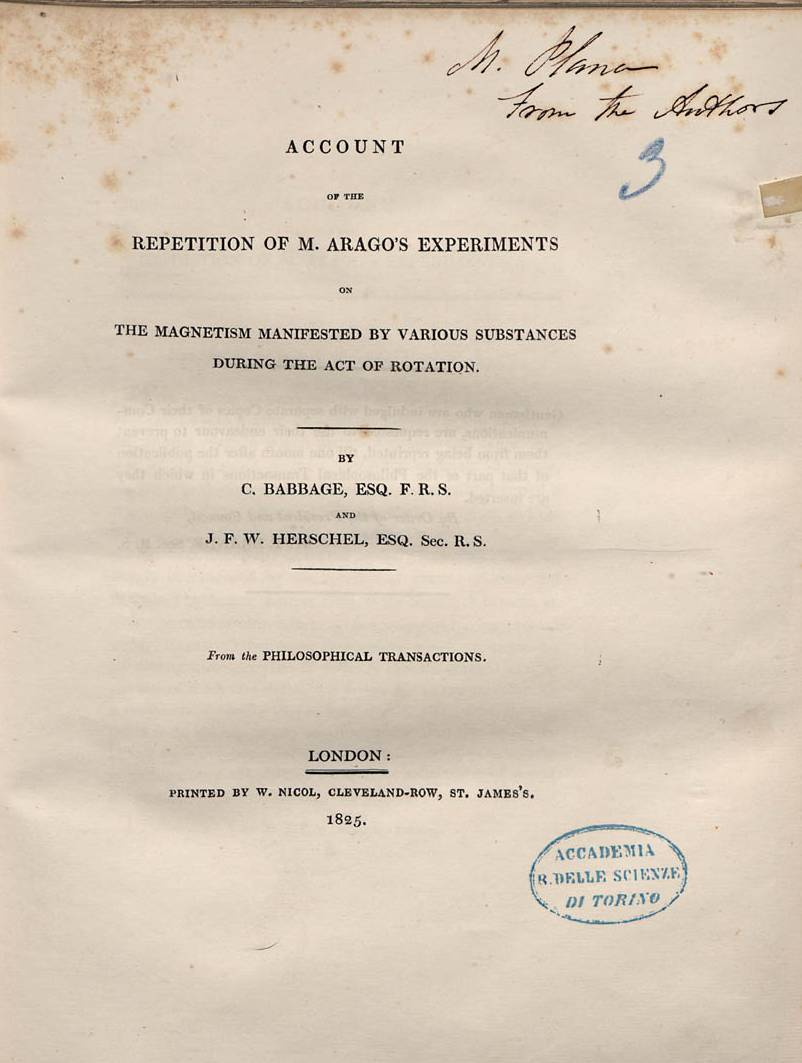
Account of the repetition of M. Arago's experiments on the magnetism manifested by various substances during the act of rotation, 1825

- Account of the repetition of M. Arago's experiments on the magnetism manifested by various substances during the act of rotation. London: William Nicol. 1825.
- Babbage, Charles (1826). A Comparative View of the Various Institutions for the Assurance of Lives. London: J. Mawman. "charles babbage."
- Babbage, Charles (1830). Reflections on the Decline of Science in England, and on Some of Its Causes. London: B. Fellowes. "charles babbage."
- Abstract of a paper entitled Observations on the Temple of Serapis at Pozzuoli. London: Richard Taylor. 1834.
- Babbage, Charles (1835). On the Economy of Machinery and Manufactures (4th ed.). London: Charles Knight.
- Babbage, Charles (1837). The Ninth Bridgewater Treatise, a Fragment. London: John Murray. "charles babbage." (Reissued by Cambridge University Press 2009, ISBN 978-1-108-00000-0.)
- Babbage, Charles (1841). Table of the Logarithms of the Natural Numbers from 1 to 108000. London: William Clowes and Sons. "charles babbage." (The LOCOMAT site contains a reconstruction of this table.)
- Babbage, Charles (1851). The Exposition of 1851. London: John Murray. "charles babbage."
- Laws of mechanical notation. 1851.
- Babbage, Charles (1864). Passages from the Life of a Philosopher . London: Longman.
- Babbage, Charles (1989). Hyman, Anthony (ed.). Science and Reform: Selected Works of Charles Babbage. Cambridge University Press. ISBN 978-0-521-34311-4.
- Babbage, Charles (1989) [1815]. "Charles Babbage's Lectures On Astronomy". London.

== See also ==
- Babbage's congruence
- IEEE Computer Society Charles Babbage Award
- List of pioneers in computer science
