= Léon Lalanne =

French engineer and politician

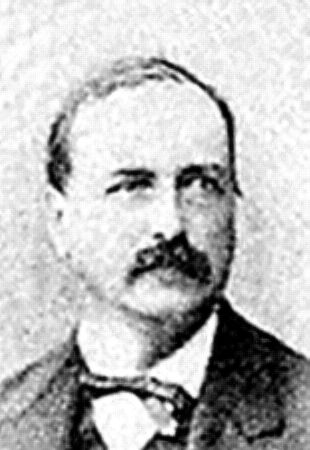
Léon Lalanne

Léon Louis Lalanne (French: [lalan]; real surname: Chrétien-Lalanne; 3 July 1811 – 12 March 1892) was a French engineer and politician.

== Life ==
Lalanne was born in Paris on 3 July 1811, as Léon Louis Chrétien, the son of François Julien Léon Chrétien, a physician, and his wife Aurore Marie Damaris Langlois; his surname became Lalanne-Chrétien in 1820, Lalanne being the unmarried name of his father's first wife, and he dropped the Chrétien for practical use. He was the brother of the historian Ludovic Lalanne (1815–1898).

Lalanne studied at the Lycée Louis-le-Grand, where he was a classmate of Évariste Galois. From 1829 at the École Polytechnique, he went on to the École des ponts et chaussées in 1831. After that, he was a civil engineer, working mostly in northern France from 1832 to 1843. In 1837 he went on the group visit to Southern Russia organized by Anatoly Demidov (the future Count Demidov and 1st Prince of San Donato). From 1839 he was working also with Jean-Claude-Républicain Arnoux, his future father-in-law, on the Ligne de Sceaux; he married in 1841.

During the Revolution of 1848, Lalanne was briefly made head of the Ateliers Nationaux (National Workshops). He undertook a severe rationalisation of the structure set up by Émile Thomas. Brought in during May, he had closed down the institutions of the Ateliers by the end of June. In the civil unrest that occurred simultaneously he commanded a battalion of the Garde Nationale in Paris. He was detained as a subversive on 29 June, but all charges were dropped on 5 August.

As a civil engineer, Lalanne became known for railway construction in Spain, Switzerland and Wallachia, where he was first engaged in 1852. He went to Bucharest in 1852, but encountered difficult local conditions. Russian operations against Ottoman possessions from July 1853, preceding the outbreak within months of the Crimean War, made his position untenable as French and British diplomats left.

From 1853 Lalanne directed the construction of railway lines in France (Part route to Strasbourg, Ardennes, Boulogne and Calais, etc.), in Switzerland (1856–1860, the railway network to the west) and northern Spain (1860/61) and the route Cordoba and Seville. He made a further visit to Wallachia in 1856. From inspector-general (1867), Lalanne in 1876 became director of the École des ponts et chaussées. Further experiences along the Danube involved Lalanne in Budapest, and in Silistra with a bridge project, and monitoring involved with demarcation after the Treaty of Berlin (1878).

In 1879 Lalanne became a member of the Académie des sciences. In 1881 he retired, and was made a Grand Officer of the Legion of Honour. He became involved in politics again in the moderate left-wing. In 1883 he became a senator for life (sénateur inamovible). In 1882, he was Chairman of the Compagnie des omnibus de Paris.

He died in Paris.

== Works ==
The context of much of Lalanne's work was the construction of the Belgian and French rail systems.

=== Cartography ===
With Charles Joseph Minard, another civil engineer of the Ponts et Chaussées, Lalanne is considered to have made important contributions to rigorous cartography. He first clarified the distinction between an isometric line and an isopleth.

Interested in population density and centres, Lalanne plotted innovative maps (1845) with contours of the same population density, and announced an "equilateral law" of equal spacing of the centres (1875), which he found a good fit in France. A paper of 1863 raised general considerations on transport routes and population distributions, direction later covered in work of Walter Christaller.

=== Mathematics ===
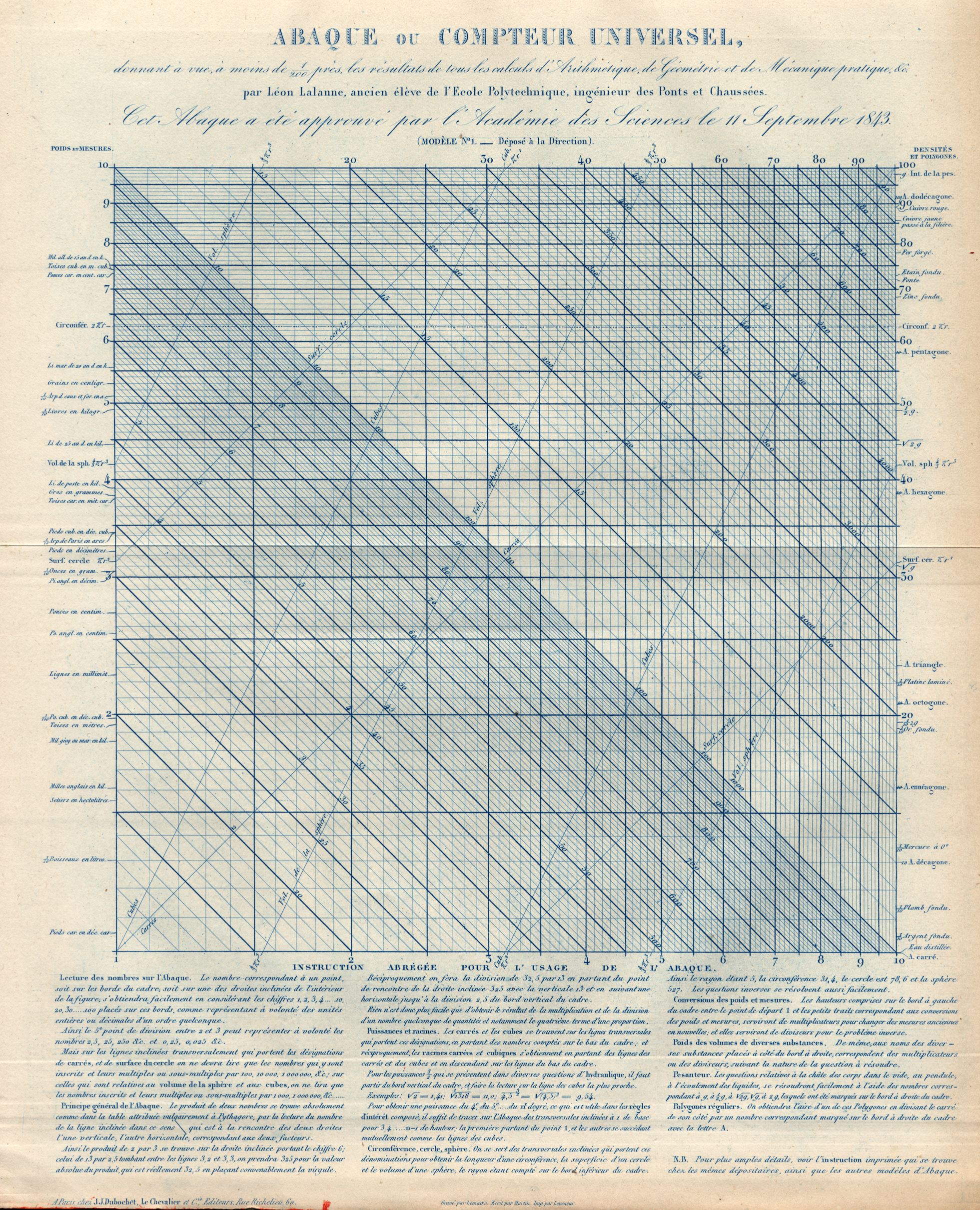
Léon Lalanne's "abacus" or "universal computer", 1843

With Philbert Maurice d'Ocagne Lalanne is considered the inventor of the nomogram. The intention was to replace the slide rule. In a paper of 1846 Lalanne contributed to the subject the ideas of anamorphosis and the use of projective transformations. There were applications to the solution of the cubic equation. He called his nomographic device the "abac". This "universal calculator" had 60 functions implemented graphically. Half a century later Maurice d'Ocagne provided a general theory, founded in projective geometry, for the nonlinear scales related by nomography.

In 1840 Lalanne announced balanced ternary as an arithmetical system, in Comptes Rendus; this followed earlier work on signed arithmetic by John Leslie and Augustin Cauchy. Also in 1840 he devised a mechanical computer capable of solving numerically polynomial equations up to degree seven.

Charles Darwin cited a paper by Lalanne from the same year 1840 on the geometry of honeycombs, in his Natural Selection manuscript.

=== Infographics ===
Lalande made a number of innovations in graphics. His "universal computer" was based on a log-log plot. In 1830 he drew a polar area diagram of ocean wind strength.

=== Civil engineering ===
As a civil engineer, Lalanne invented and published a graphical method to optimize the design of roads, now known as the épure de Lalanne. He researched it during the 1830s, and published supporting tables. Along the planned route earth masses are plotted (with a negative or positive sign) as the abscissa, the sign reflecting whether spoil is to be removed or earth to be added. Estimates of mass movement become an area under the curve.

=== Political economy and technology ===
In 1840 Lalanne wrote an encyclopedia article Technologie for Un million des faits that cited both Charles Babbage and Claude Lucien Bergery, in reducing the problems of manufacturing to "technology". The following year in a comparable article Essai philosophique sur la technologie for the Encyclopédie nouvelle, edited by Pierre Leroux and Jean Reynaud, and intended for a less popular readership, he attempted a definition of the neologism "cerdoristique industrielle" of André-Marie Ampère. In so doing he cited Babbage favourably on management accounting principles, and Andrew Ure.

A strong critic of the principle of division of labour pushed to its logical conclusion, Lalanne picked up the reasoning of Pierre-Édouard Lémontey and took it further. Seeing repetitive work without variation as negative, he saw the solution as lying in automation.

== Books ==
- Mémoire sur l'arithmoplanimétrie (1840)
- Collection de tables pour les abréger calculs relatifs à la réduction of projets de routes et chemins de 6 meters de largeur (1843)
- Description et de l'usage abaque ou compteur universel (1845).
- Méthodes graphiques pour l'expression des lois empiriques ou mathémathiques à trois variables avec des applications à l'art de l'ingénieur et a la résolution des équations numériques d'un degré quelconde (1880).
