= King George III Museum =

Coordinates: 51.5114°N 0.1159°W

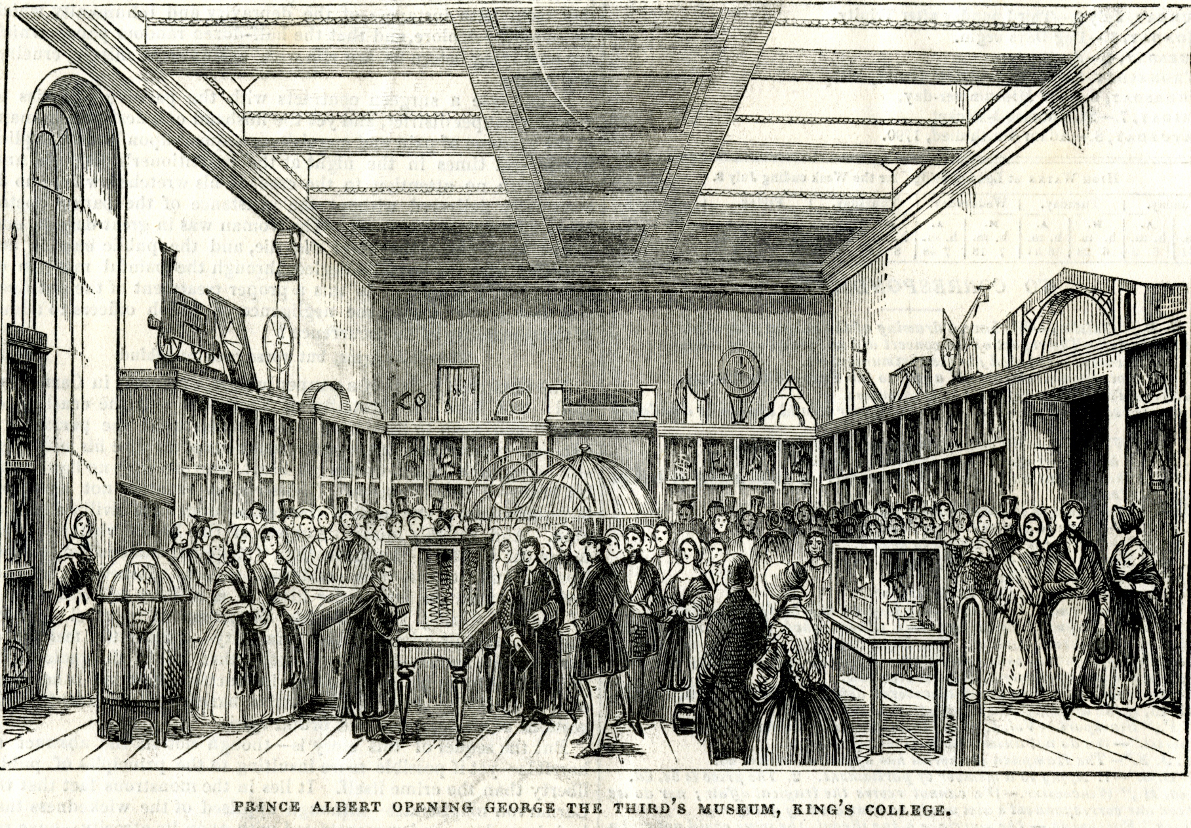
- Opening of the King George III Museum, King's College London, by Albert, Prince Consort on 1 July 1843.
- Established: 1843
- Dissolved: 1927
- Location: King's College London, London, United Kingdom
- Type: University museum

The King George III Museum was a museum within King's College London, England between 1843 and 1927 which held the collections of scientific instruments of George III as well as eminent nineteenth-century scientists including Sir Charles Wheatstone and Charles Babbage. The collection of scientific and mathematical instruments assembled by George III, after whom the museum is named, was donated to the university by Queen Victoria in 1841, and the museum was opened by Albert, Prince Consort on 1 July 1843. The museum was located within the King's Building designed by Sir Robert Smirke. It counted among its collections the unfinished prototype of the Difference Engine No. 1, designed by Charles Babbage, who is considered a "father of the computer". The museum closed in 1926, and much of its collections were transferred on loan to the Science Museum, London.

== History ==
The scientific collections of George III were previously housed in the Kew Observatory, Kew, which had been the king's private observatory, constructed to observe the Transit of Venus in 1769. In the mid-nineteenth century the government discontinued the maintenance of Kew, giving rise to the need to house the collections elsewhere. The collection of electrical and mechanical apparatus for use in scientific experimentation, which had formed the nucleus of the royal collection and had served for the instruction of the royal children, was donated to the university by Queen Victoria in 1841 and the museum was opened by Albert, Prince Consort on 1 July 1843. The royal gift was presented to the college for the purposes of maintaining "a general course of experimental philosophy" with the stipulation that it should remain intact and be associated with the name of its royal founder.

The museum held the collections of Sir Charles Wheatstone, Professor of Chemistry and Experimental Philosophy at King's, which were bequeathed to King's College following his death in 1875. In 1926, due to space constraints within the college much of the museum's collections were transferred on loan to the Science Museum or kept in the college archives.

== Location ==
The museum was located in a double-height galleried space opposite the Council Room in the King's Building designed by Sir Robert Smirke, part of the Strand Campus.
