= HollyShorts Film Festival =

Short film festival in Hollywood, California

- 21st Edition poster
- Location: Hollywood, California, United States
- Founded: 2005
- Most recent: 2024
- Festival date: Opening: 7 August 2025; Closing: 17 August 2025
- Language: International
- Website: http://hollyshorts.com

Current: 21st
- 22nd 20th

The HollyShorts Film Festival is an annual Academy Awards-qualifying independent short film festival located in Hollywood, California.

== History ==
Founded in 2005, the yearly festival programmes feature a mixture of short films of various genres from around the world.

HollyShorts inaugural Film Festival took place at The Space Theatre in Hollywood in August 2005 and featured 23 short films from the U.S., Canada, Poland, the U.K., and Thailand. The 2nd annual 2006 HollyShorts Film Festival was held at Cinespace in Hollywood, California, and also featured 53 short films from all around the world, with over thirteen countries being represented. The third annual 2007 HollyShorts Film Festival took place from August 10-12 in 2007, and awarded goodies.

The 4th Annual HollyShorts Film Festival took place on August 7–10, 2008 in Hollywood with top honors of Best Short Film going to “Bloom” directed Lance Larson. Larson was awarded $2000 VFX package courtesy of Clifton Post for his next project. The Best Student Short honors went to David Jibladze, for his short film “Beholden.” Jibladze took home a 5-day HVX-200, HD Camera rental package courtesy of Martini Crew Booking. Over $25,000 in prizes were awarded.

The 5th Annual HollyShorts Film Festival took place August 6–13 at the DGA and Laemmle's Sunset 5 Theatre in Hollywood with top honors of Best Short Film going to La Petite Lilia, directed by Reda Mustafa. Mustafa took home a prize package from Clifton Production Services which included a RED ONE digital cinema package valued up to $5,000.00, while Johnny Gill took home a $10,000 cash prize for the Haydenfilms Online Film Festival contest for his short film “My Turtle’s Name is Dudley."

The 6th Annual HollyShorts Film Festival® took place August 5–12, 2010 in Hollywood and featured a major opening night reception, week-long screenings of short films and feature films in Hollywood, high-level industry panels, keynotes, awards and receptions for the community and filmmakers. Grand prizes were awarded for Best Short and Best Director courtesy of Company 3 valued at $20,000. Openfilm also sponsored the festival and screened their top 5 finalists for their $250,000 Get It Made Competition, at the fest. James Caan attended the opening night ceremonies and named the finalists.

The 7th Annual HSFF took place on August 11-18 in Hollywood. HSFF unveiled many other important upcoming celebrity and sponsorship participation as the Festival approached. HSFF Alumni included Josh Brolin, Darren Lew, David Arquette, Malcolm Barrett, Carter Smith, Jason Biggs, David Pryor, Jimmy Jean Louis, Paula Garces, Adrian Grenier, David Lynch, Bragi Schut, David Weinstein, William Olssen, Alex Ferrari, Larry Hankin, Lance Larson, John Thompson, Nick Carmen, Scott Porter, Joel David Moore, Mary Pat Bentel, Denis Hennelly, Richard Riehle, and great filmmakers and actors.

The festival has screened 3D short films before, opening its 6th Annual festival with The Butler's in Love (directed by David Arquette and starring Elizabeth Berkley and Thomas Jane), and Sean Isroelit's The Caretaker 3D, which starred TV icon Dick Van Dyke.

The 21st edition of the festival will be held from August 7–17, 2025. David Oyelowo, Jared Hess and Katherine McNamara will be honored at the festival.

== Previous guests ==
Previous actors or celebrities who had films appear in the festival, or who made appearances at the festival, include Josh Brolin, Zachary Quinto (the short film Hostage: A Love Story which screened at the festival), Oscar-winning short film director Luke Matheny (God of Love which screened at the festival), Jessica Biel, James Caan, David Lynch, Kirsten Dunst, David Arquette (a 3D short film directed by Arquette entitled The Butler's in Love opened the 6th annual HollyShorts Film Festival and starred Thomas Jane and Elizabeth Berkley), Harry Lennix, Adrian Grenier, former SF Mayor and Lieutenant Governor of California Gavin Newsom, Zoe Saldaña, Kate Bosworth (both Saldaña and Bosworth starred in a short film called Idiots that screened at the festival), Chadwick Boseman, Diane Lane, Eli Roth, Jane Lynch, Steve Nguyen, Grace Huang (who won Best Actress for her role in Jennifer Thym's short film, Bloodtraffick which screened at the festival), Matthew Modine, Matthew Libatique, Malcolm Barrett, Jason Biggs, Tracy Middendorf, Ele Keats, John Dahl, David Rodriguez, Larry Hankin, Scott Porter, Feodor Chin, Joel David Moore, Ben Lyons, Timothy Tau, Carter Smith, Jamie Linden, David Dastmalchian, Nicholas McCarthy, Jimmy Jean-Louis, Joe Carnahan, Ray Abruzzo, Neil LaBute, Ben Lyons, and more.

== Organization ==
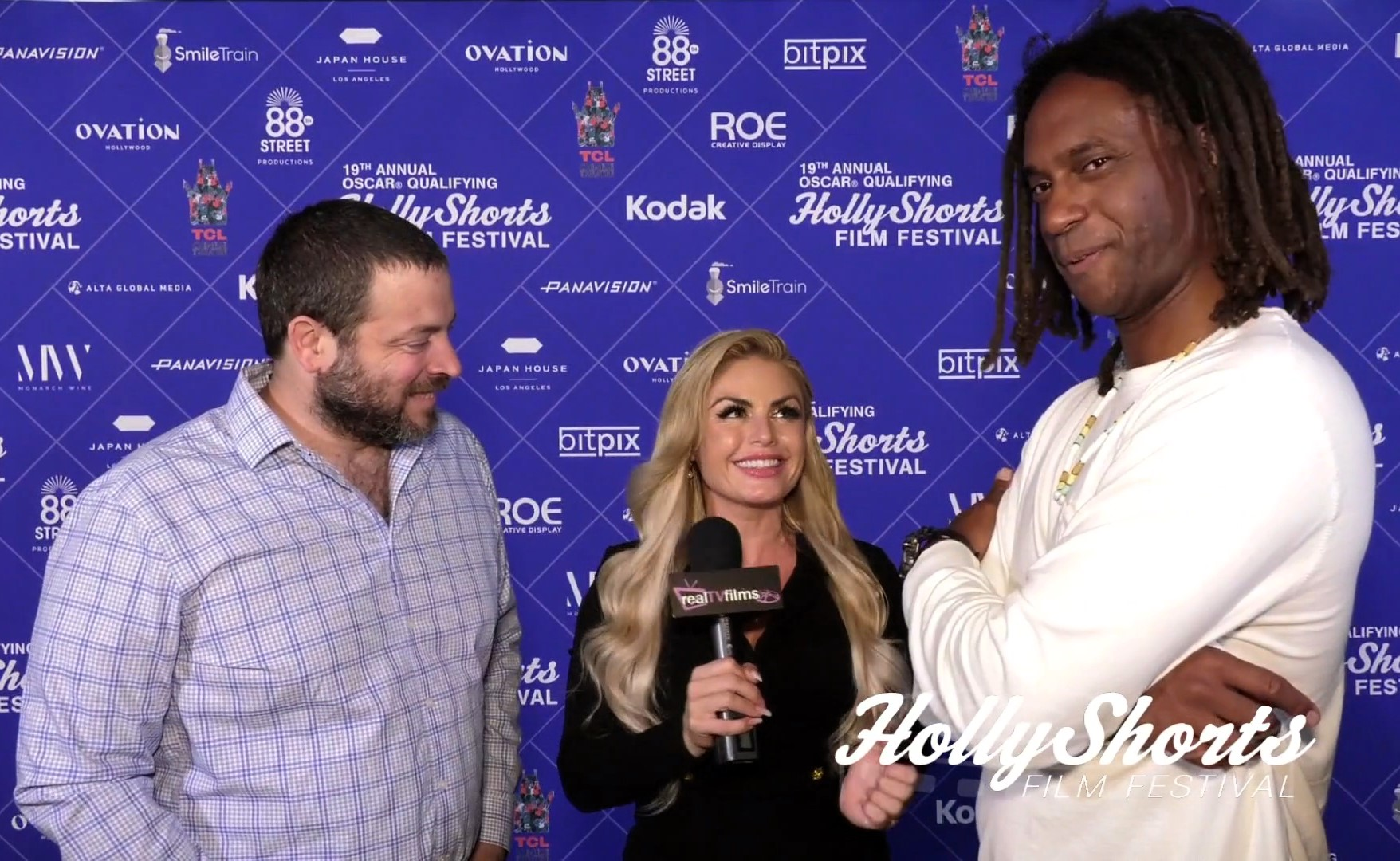
Founders and directors Daniel Sol (left) and Theo Dumont (right) interviewed by Tia Barr in 2023

Currently, the festival is directed by co-founders Theo Dumont and Daniel Sol.

The festival also holds a number of monthly screenings.
