= Ludovic Lalanne =

French historian and librarian (1815-1898)

- Born: 23 April 1815; Paris
- Died: 16 May 1898 (aged 83); Paris
- Occupations: Historian; Librarian

Ludovic Lalanne (23 April 1815, Paris – 16 May 1898, Paris) was a French historian and librarian. The engineer and politician Léon Lalanne (1811–1892) was his brother.

== Biography ==
Lalanne was a student at the lycée Louis-le-Grand and later at the École des Chartes, where he was graduated archivist paleographer in 1841. He was librarian of the Institut.

He was a resident member of the Comité des travaux historiques et scientifiques, archivist of the Société de l'École des chartes and president of the Société de l'histoire de France.

== Publications ==
Lalanne published many works (sometimes in collaboration) including:

- Essai sur le feu grégeois et sur la poudre à canon, 1845
- Les Pèlerinages en Terre Sainte avant les Croisades, 1845
- Curiosités littéraires, 1845
- Curiosités bibliographiques, 1845
- Journal d'un bourgeois de Paris sous François Ier (1515–1536), 1854
- Curiosités philologiques, géographiques et ethnologiques, 1855
- Les Tragiques d'Augrippa d'Abigné, 1857
- Mémoires de Marguerite de Valois, 1858
- Curiosités biographiques, 1858
- Œuvres de Malherbe, 1862
- Dictionnaire historique de la France, 1872–77
- Mémoires de Roger de Rabutin, comte de Bussy, 1882
- Le Livre de fortune de Jehan Cousin, recueil de deux cents dessins inédits, 1883
- Œuvres complètes de Pierre de Bourdeille, seigneur de Brantôme, 1864–82
- Journal du voyage du Cavalier Bernin en France, 1885
- Œuvres de Lagrange, 1892
- Brantôme sa vie et ses écrits, 1896

Lalanne also realised the inventory of the manuscripts of Paris Observatory Library.
