= Claude Lucien Bergery =

French economist (1787–1863)

Claude Lucien Bergery (1787–1863) was a French economist and management theorist. He was a founder of scientific management.

== Life ==
The son of an innkeeper, Bergery was born in Orléans. He was a student at the École Polytechnique which he entered in 1806, He became an artillery captain, serving in Spain, and was decorated by Napoleon I during the Hundred Days. Demobilised, he taught applied science at the École royale de l'artillerie in Metz from 1817, then transferred to teacher training in the same city.

Bergery believed the study of applied geometry was improving. With Jean-Victor Poncelet, he created free courses for workers and artisans, in response to a call from Charles Dupin. Courses were given in 1826 by Bergery, Poncelet, Libre-Irmond Bardin and Jean-Louis Woisard, all past polytechniciens.

In the aftermath of the July Revolution of 1830 Bergery had a chance to move to Paris. He had supporters who wished to keep out Adolphe Blanqui, who became successor to Jean-Baptiste Say at the Conservatoire national des arts et métiers; and he might have combined that position with the artillery professorship at Vincennes. In the event, he preferred to stay in Metz. He was elected a corresponding member of the moral section of the Académie des Sciences Morales et Politiques on 25 January 1834.

Bergery was one of the founders in 1834 of La Gerbe de la Moselle, a monthly periodical to which he contributed. It ran to 1839, and Bergery became the major contributor. From 1840 it was succeeded by L'instituteur de la Moselle, which became in 1842 Le Messager de la Moselle. Bergery was on its editorial committee. The Gerbe proved divisive in Metz, in particular with Bergery's line as moralist and social critic.

In 1835 Bergery quarrelled seriously with Poncelet and François Théodore Gosselin, who accused him of plagiarism; and his position in Metz was undermined. He became the mayor of Tincry in 1848, where he opened a primary school for girls in 1857. He was made an Officer of the Legion of Honour in 1847 when he retired. He died at Tincry.

== Works ==
Bergery's thought drew heavily on the thought of Dupin, Say and Gérard-Joseph Christian, who was director of the Conservatoire. He was influenced particularly by the Cours complet d'économie politique pratique of Say. He wrote:

- Géométrie des courbes appliquée à l'industrie (1825), based on public lectures.
- Economie industrielle, ou, Science de l'industrie (1829–31). This work was in three volumes, the first (1829, 2nd edition 1833) being Economie de l'ouvrier, the second and third Economie du fabricant. Where the first volume included advice for lifestyle of a worker, the others were a management manual, the whole being connected by the idea that a frugal worker could, with temperance and restraint, accumulate capital. Volume 1 gained Bergery a Prix Montyon. This was an early course covering industrial management as a whole. It appeared at the same time as work of Charles Babbage in the same area. Bergery paid more attention to the issue of recruitment, and tried to quantify the cost of Monday absenteeism.
- Théorie des affuts et des voitures d'artillerie (1840) with Jean-Charles Migout. This work on gun carriages was based on a course given at Metz in the later 1820s by Bergery and two colleagues (the obscure Migout and Jean-Louis Woisard, 1798–1828), at the request of the War Ministry. The second edition advocated for interchangeable parts. The authors wrote also a Cours des Machines (1842) for artillery officers.

Arithmétique appliquée aux spéculations commerciales et industrielles (1830) was the second edition by Bergery of a book by the late Woisard. Bergery also wrote textbooks and elementary works on elementary geometry, chemistry and other topics. In 1837 Complements to his arithmetic text addressed the teaching of probability, in the context of gambling and economics, then an innovative idea.
