= Haydenfilms =

American independent film producer and distributor

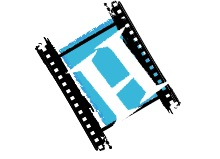
- Haydenfilms Institute logo
- Industry: Film
- Founded: 2001; 25 years ago
- Founder: Hayden Craddolph
- Headquarters: Lehigh Valley, Pennsylvania
- Website: Official website

Haydenfilms LLC is a producer and distributor of independent films. It was founded in 2001 by Hayden Craddolph, the current executive director of the Haydenfilms Institute (HFI). Haydenfilms is based in Lehigh Valley, Pennsylvania, at the TEK Park campus.

== History ==
Haydenfilms LLC began as the thesis of Electronic Media postgraduate at Kutztown University Hayden Craddolph in 2001. In 2004, Haydenfilms hosted one of the world's first online film festivals and was one of the first to accept all short films regardless of genre.

Haydenfilms also developed as a production-based organization. In 2007, the organization partnered with director Patrick Steward to produce his film The Hollow Tree, fundraising the film's entire budget as well as facilitating casting calls and other miscellaneous areas of production. The Hollow Tree competed in the 2008-2010 festival circuit and was screened at the Cannes Film Festival and the Hamptons International Film Festival, among others. HFI has since worked on projects for the Berks Women in Crisis organization and Shale Gas Outage.

In 2010, the IRS approved the Haydenfilms Institute for 501(c)(3) tax exempt status. According to the HFI's website, the institute's mission is to empower, educate and fund independent student filmmakers.

HFI is currently in development for the 5.0 Online Film Festival, this time planning to offer a $25,000 grand prize for the winning director.

== Haydenfilms online film festival ==
In 2004, Haydenfilms launched its first online film festival.

Haydenfilms accepts short films from independent filmmakers around the globe. Films are submitted through the organization's website where a panel of industry expert judges select the top 50 entry films. These top 50 films are then entered into Haydenfilms Online Film Festival, hosted exclusively on the website. This global platform allows viewers worldwide to browse, rate, and comment on each contending film throughout the competition. The winning filmmaker is announced live during the official award ceremony, taking home the $10,000 grand prize. HFI is in development of the 5.0 Online Film Festival with a grand prize of $25,000.

Past Winners

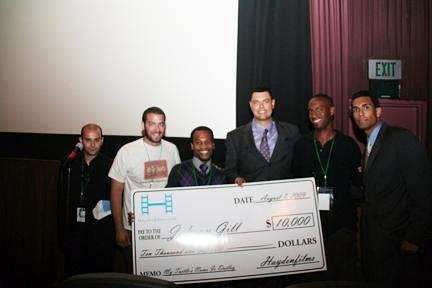
Johnny Ray Gill, actor on NBC's "Harry's Law," accepting $10,000 prize.

Festival	Winner	Winning Film
1.0	Quinn Saunders	"Fortunate Son"
2.0	John Burgess	"The Powder Puff Principle"
3.0	Reda Mustafa	"The Boot of War"
4.0	Johnny Ray Gill	"My Turtle's Name is Dudley"

== Programs ==
HFI hosts a variety of educational programs designed for filmmakers.

=== Youth Media Initiative ===
Drawing on the inspiration of the PSAs created by youth of Olivet Boys & Girls Club, Haydenfilms Institute created an eight-week PSA curriculum known as the Haydenfilms Youth Media Initiative. HFI partnered with the Reading Youth Violence Prevention Program, which aimed to reduce violence in Reading, Pennsylvania, by 5% by 2014. Through this curriculum, 50 youth from Reading, 14 to 18 years of age, received instruction in various skills in filmmaking and production at Kutztown University from October to December 2012. During the program, the students wrote, directed, and starred in 20 public service announcements for 10 Reading-based nonprofit organizations. In May 2013, the 20 PSAs were featured in a 60-day online film competition hosted exclusively on the HFI website. The public was able to view and vote on each student-produced PSA, and the top three winning student teams shared a $10,000 scholarship for further education endeavors. The event was reported on by Youth Today and WFMZ, Channel 69 News.

=== Business of Entertainment Panel ===
In April 2014, HFI hosted a two-day Workshop and Business of Entertainment Panel which provided an opportunity for high school students to get hands-on experience behind the camera. Creating their own original 30 second commercials for Advantage Point Student Apartments, these students had the chance to learn teamwork, while experimenting with media and technology, which the fulfilled. They were also able to meet and hear from Academy Award-winner, Ron Judkins.

=== Filmmaking Labs ===
Haydenfilms Institute implements three six-week-long filmmaking labs which educate students in distinct areas of filmmaking. Students of all levels learn and gain exposure to various disciplines related to the craft of film, such as directing, cinematography, production design, editing, and the theory and practice of acting. These sessions aim to strengthen participants’ skills as industry professionals and introduce them to the gripping world of cinema.

=== Commercial Camp ===
Similar in format to the Youth Media Initiative, HFI's summer commercial camps offer students an intensive immersion in film creation and production. Participants create several short commercials for sponsoring companies which then enter an online film competition hosted by HFI. All of the completed commercials are made available for the companies to use at their discretion.

=== Haydenfilms Institute Academy Internship Program ===
Haydenfilms Institute runs semester-long internship programs that give college students the opportunity to work in a dynamic environment while contributing to an independent film organization. Internship opportunities are offered in 3, 6 or 9 credit programs, and provide a range of 150–450 hours of experience in film and video production services, professional writing, computer science, and marketing.
