= Awards and prizes of the University of Cambridge =

List of awards and prizes

Official coat of arms of the University of Cambridge

The University of Cambridge (formally The Chancellor, Masters, and Scholars of the University of Cambridge) is a collegiate public research university in Cambridge, England. Founded in 1209 and granted a royal charter by King Henry III in 1231, Cambridge is the second-oldest university in the English-speaking world and the world's fourth-oldest surviving university. The history and influence of the University of Cambridge has made it one of the most prestigious universities in the world. Numerous scholarships, prizes, honors, and awards specific to the university are awarded to prospective or current students.

== List of awards ==
- Adam Smith Prize: awarded for best performance in the Part IIB Economics Tripos examinations and dissertation
- Adams Prize: awarded for distinguished research in the Mathematical Sciences
- Browne Medal: awarded for annual competitions in Latin and Greek poetry
- Carus Greek Testament Prizes awarded to candidates who are given a passage in Greek from the New Testament and asked to translate and interpret it.
- Chancellor's Gold Medal: awarded for achievements in poetry
- Dr Manmohan Singh Scholarship: scholarships available to Indian students for graduate and undergraduate study at Cambridge
- Gates Cambridge Scholarship: scholarships available to outstanding graduate students to enable study at Cambridge
- Hartree and Clerk Maxwell prize: awarded for best performance in the Part II Physics Tripos examinations
- Humanitas Programme: visiting professorship granted in cooperation with the University of Oxford
- John Stewart of Rannoch Scholarship: scholarships available for studies of Hebrew, Latin and Greek, and sacred music
- Pitt Scholarship: scholarship awarded for the study of classics
- Porson Prize: awarded for Greek verse composition
- Raymond Horton-Smith Prize: awarded for the best thesis presented for MD degree during the academic year
- Rollo Davidson Prize: awarded annually to early-career probabilists
- Seatonian Prize: awarded for the best English-language poem on a sacred subject
- Smith's Prize: two prizes awarded annually to two research students in mathematics and theoretical physics
- Thirlwall Prize: awarded for the best essay about British history or literature for a subject with original research
- Thomas Bond Sprague Prize: awarded to the student or students showing the greatest distinction in Part III of the Mathematical Tripos examinations
- Tyson Medal: awarded for the best performance in subjects relating to astronomy
- Winchester Reading Prize: awarded for the public reading of specific passages of literature
- Wooden spoon at the University of Cambridge: now-defunct booby prize given to the student who achieved the lowest passing exam marks
- Wrangler: a student who gains first-class honours in the third year of the university's undergraduate degree in mathematics.
- Yorke Prize: awarded for an essay on a legal subject which substantially contributes to the field
