= Barbara Ercolano =

Italian astrophysicist

Barbara Ercolano (born 1977) is an Italian astrophysicist recognized for her research and work on interstellar dust, star formation, and protoplanetary disks. She holds the position of Professor for Theoretical Astrophysics in the University Observatory Munich at LMU Munich. Her work has been significant to understanding the processes involved in planet formation.

== Early life and education ==
Ercolano was born and originally from Naples in Italy, where she lived until she was 18. She then moved to London to study astrophysics at University College London (UCL). She obtained her PhD at UCL, during which she developed the first version of MOCASSIN, a 3D photoionization and dust radiative transfer code. The code’s ability to stimulate interactions between radiation and dust in astrophysical environments became a foundation of her research moving forward. After obtaining her PhD and spending time doing postdoctoral research at UCL, the Center for Astrophysics | Harvard & Smithsonian, and the University of Cambridge. Her experience across many institutions expanded her expertise in theoretical astrophysics that she was able to become a professor. She became a lecturer in astrophysics at the University of Exeter and then she moved to Germany to join LMU Munich as a professor in 2010.

== MOCASSIN and research focus ==
Barbara Ercolano’s research has been a significant contribution to the understanding of many interstellar subjects like interstellar dust, star formation, and protoplanetary disks. A central aspect of her work is MOCASSIN, a 3D code written in the Fortran 90 coding language, which uses the Monte Carlo approach to model transfer of radiation. Ercolano’s work and her work using the MOCASSIN code has provided many insights into how radiation from young stars affect their surrounding environments and the formation of planets. In addition to her research and work with MOCASSIN, Ercolano has co-authored many research papers. For example, her work on the dispersal planet-forming disk explores mechanisms on how protoplanetary disks dissipate over time. This research shows that high energy radiation from young stairs plays a crucial role in causing gas to escape from the disk, influencing how the disk develops and the formation of planets. One of her other notable papers, co-authored with James E. Owen and Cathie J. Clarke, focused on how X-ray photoevaporation affects evolution and dispersal of protoplanetary disks. It demonstrates that high-energy X-rays from a young star can drive the removal of gas from these disks, influencing the disk’s evolution and potential for planet formation.

== Awards and recognition ==
Ercolano is the 2010 winner of the Fowler Award for Early Career Achievements in Astronomy from the Royal Astronomical Society. The award recognized her contributions to the field such as the development of MOCASSIN and her research on protoplanetary disks.
