= Tiziana Di Matteo =

Tiziana Di Matteo may refer to:

- Tiziana Di Matteo (astrophysicist)
- Tiziana Di Matteo (econophysicist)
