= Aigrain =

Aigrain is a surname. Notable people with the surname include:

- Philippe Aigrain (1949–2021), French computer scientist, activist, and researcher
- Pierre Aigrain (1924–2002), French physicist
- Suzanne Aigrain (born 1979), professor of astrophysics
