= Douglas C. Heggie =

Scottish applied mathematician and astronomer

Douglas C. Heggie FRSE
- Born: Douglas Cameron Heggie; 7 February 1947 (age 79); Edinburgh, Scotland
- Education: Trinity College, Cambridge
- Known for: Stellar dynamics; Celestial mechanics
- Awards: Tyson Medal (1969); Smith's Prize (1971); Fellow of the Royal Society of Edinburgh (1989)
- Scientific career
- Fields: Applied mathematics; Astronomy
- Workplaces: University of Cambridge University of Edinburgh
- Thesis: Binary Evolution in Stellar Dynamics (1972)
- Doctoral advisor: Sverre Aarseth
- Website: www.maths.ed.ac.uk/~heggie/

Douglas Cameron Heggie FRSE (born 7 February 1947) is a Scottish applied mathematician and astronomer, formerly holding the Personal Chair of Mathematical Astronomy at the School of Mathematics at the University of Edinburgh. His main research interests are in stellar dynamics.

== Research ==
Heggie has conducted pioneering theoretical research on the topic of the classical gravitational N-body problem, with a particular focus on the three-body problem, and related applications to the dynamical evolution of globular star clusters and high-performance computing. The article in which he presented the theory of binary evolution in stellar dynamics (often referred to as Heggie's law) has found an outstanding spectrum of applications in many astrophysical domains.

One of the originators of the current paradigm of the dynamical evolution of collisional stellar systems, he has made seminal contributions also to the quantitative study of prehistoric mathematics and astronomy. On these subjects, he has authored or co-authored of two books: The Gravitational Million-Body Problem: A Multidisciplinary Approach to Star Cluster Dynamics and Megalithic Science: Ancient Mathematics and Astronomy in North-west Europe.

== Education and career ==
Educated at George Heriot's School in Edinburgh, Scotland (Captain and Dux 1965), he spent a decade as an undergraduate student (Wrangler 1968), graduate student (PhD 1973), and research fellow (1972–1976) at Trinity College, Cambridge and Institute of Theoretical Astronomy. Following his appointment to a Lectureship (1975) at the then Department of Mathematics in Edinburgh, his entire professional career has been based there, with prolonged research visits to Princeton, Cambridge, Kyoto, and Warsaw.

He was appointed Professor of Mathematical Astronomy at the University of Edinburgh in 1994, has held visiting professorships at Université Louis Pasteur, Strasbourg and Yukawa Institute for Theoretical Physics, Kyoto, and an honorary professorship at Heriot-Watt University, Edinburgh.

Among other indicators of esteem, he has served as the President of Commission 37 of the International Astronomical Union, on the Council of the Royal Astronomical Society of London (Triennium 1982–1985), as an Editor of long standing of its main research journal, Monthly Notices, as well as an Advisory Editor of the Journal for the History of Astronomy.

== Honours ==
Recipient of the Tyson Medal (1969) and Smith's Prize (1971). Elected Fellow of the Royal Society of Edinburgh (1989). Recipient of the Eddington Medal of the Royal Astronomical Society (2025).
