= Elena Terlevich =

Argentine astrophysicist

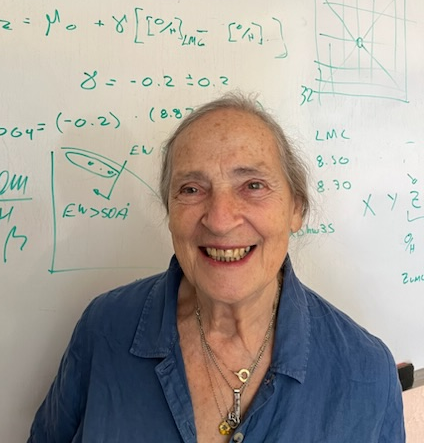
- Terlevich in 2024
- Education: National University of La Plata; University of Cambridge
- Spouse: Roberto J. Terlevich
- Scientific career
- Workplaces: Cambridge Institute of Astronomy; National Institute of Astrophysics, Optics and Electronics
- Thesis: Evolution of Open Clusters (1984)

Elena Kirilovsky-Terlevich is an Argentine astrophysicist who works in Mexico as a researcher in the National Institute of Astrophysics, Optics and Electronics (INAOE). Her research involves galaxy formation and evolution, and the patterns of star formation within galaxies, especially those with active nuclei.

== Education and career ==
Terlevich earned a degree in astronomy from the National University of La Plata in 1970. However, the political conditions in Argentina in the 1970s kept her from continuing at the university, and instead in 1977 she fled the country with her husband, astrophysicist Roberto J. Terlevich. They went from there to England, where Terlevich completed a PhD in 1984 at the University of Cambridge. Her dissertation, Evolution of Open Clusters, was supervised by Sverre Aarseth.

After continuing to work as a researcher in the Cambridge Institute of Astronomy, and nearing retirement there, Terlevich moved with her husband to INAOE in 1998.

== Recognition ==
Terlevich is a member of the Mexican Academy of Sciences. In 2022 the National University of La Plata gave both Terlevich and her husband honorary doctorates.
