= Benjamin Donn =

English mathematician

Benjamin Donn or Donne (1729–1798) was an English mathematician.

== Life ==
Donn was born at Bideford, Devon, where his father and brother Abraham (1718–1746) kept a school. Until 1768 he was a ‘teacher of the mathematics and natural philosophy on the Newtonian principles’ in his native town.

In 1768 he was elected librarian of the Bristol Library, and had fruitless plans converting it into a mathematical academy. As his official duties were light, he started an academy at Bristol on his own account, in the park, near St. Michael's Church; and in the year of his election published his Young Shopkeeper's &c. Companion, which was specially compiled for that academy. In addition to his school he gave a course of fourteen lectures in experimental philosophy to subscribers at one guinea each. These lectures he continued to deliver when he left Bristol for Kingston near Taunton; but then he delivered them in the Christmas or midsummer vacation. He would travel thirty miles for twenty subscribers, or fifty miles for thirty subscribers. By 1775 he was settled at Kingston.

Towards the end of his life he was appointed master of mechanics to the king, on the death of Anthony Shepherd. He died in June 1798. Donn mentions in his Mathematical Tables, 1789, that he has added a final e to his name; but on the title-page the name is spelt Donn.

== Works ==
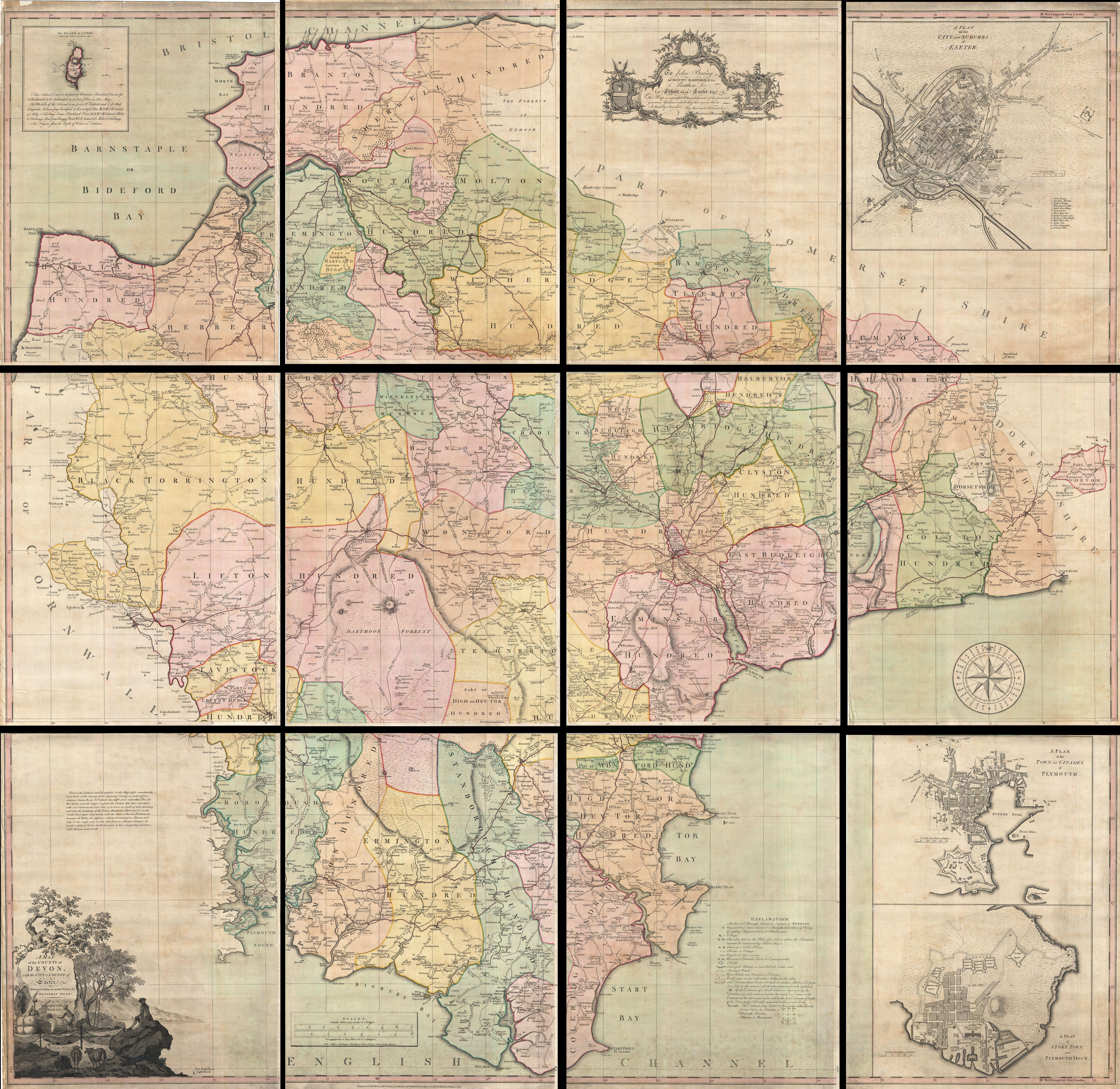
Map of Devonshire by Benjamin Donn (1765)

From 1749 to 1756 he contributed to the Gentleman's Diary, then edited by John Badder and Thomas Peat, but ceased to contribute after 1756, when Peat became sole editor. His contributions were accounts of eclipses observed at Bideford, and answers to most of the mathematical questions in it of the period.

Donn published in 1765 a map of Devonshire, from a survey he took himself, for which he received a premium of £100 from the Society of Arts. He published further maps. and produced mathematical instruments, a list of which is in Mathematical Tables, 1789.

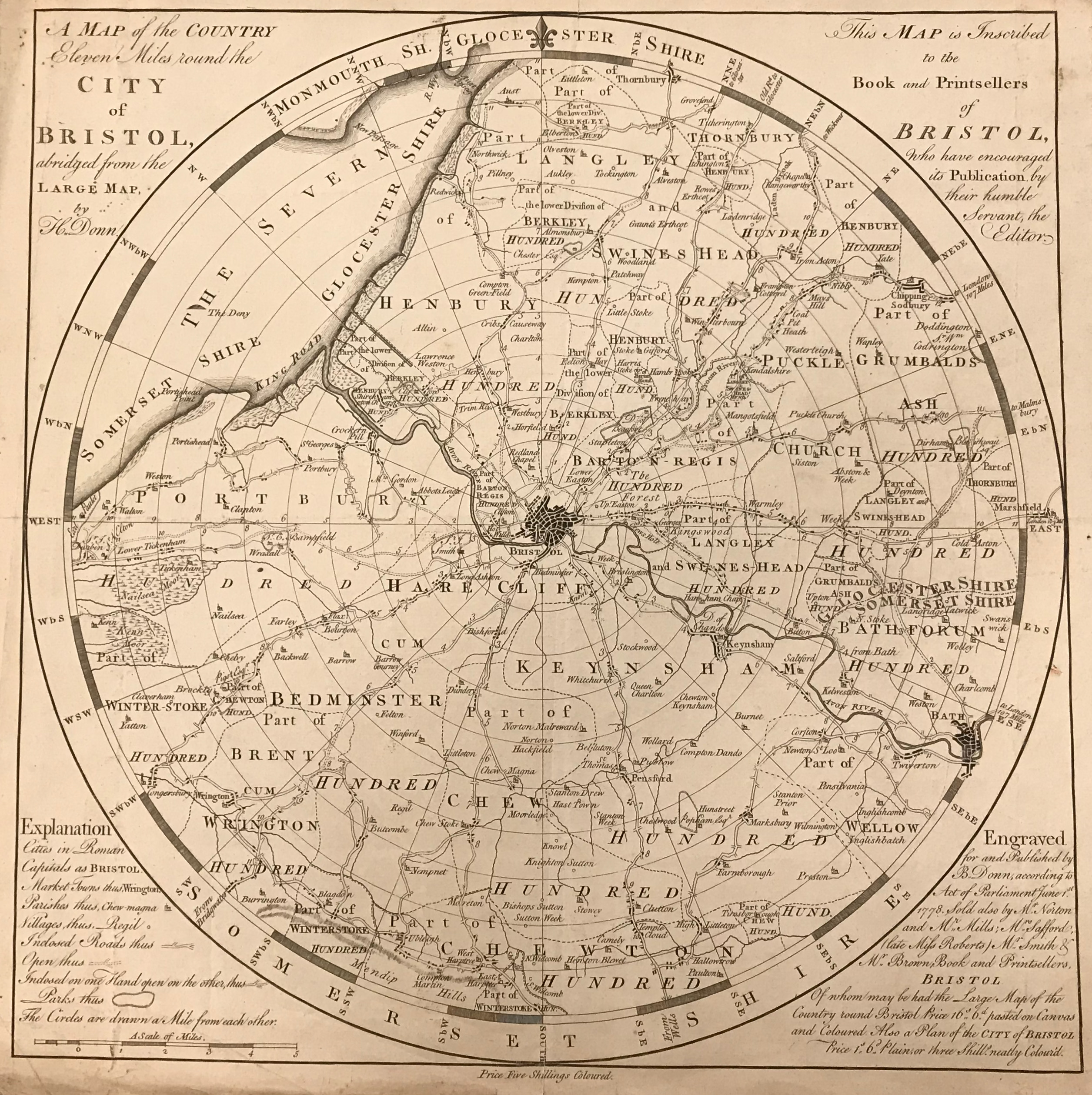
Eighteenth-century map of the city and region around Bristol, England.

His works are:

- ‘A New Introduction to the Mathematics; being Essays on Vulgar and Decimal Arithmetic,’ 1758, 2nd edit., called ‘Mathematical Essays, or a New Introduction,’ &c. 1764.
- ‘The Geometrician, containing Essays on Plane Geometry and Trigonometry,’ 1759; 2nd edit. 1775; another, called 2nd edit., 1778.
- ‘The Accountant, containing Essays on Bookkeeping by Single and Double Entry,’ 1759; 2nd edit. 1775.
- ‘Essay on the Doctrine and Application of Circulating or Infinite Decimals,’ 1759; 2nd edit, 1775.
- ‘The Schoolmaster's Repository, or Pupil's Exercise.’ Intended as a supplement to the ‘Mathematical Essays,’ 1764.
- ‘Epitome of Natural and Experimental Philosophy,’ 1771.
- ‘The Young Shopkeeper's, Steward's, and Factor's Companion,’ 1768; 2nd edit. 1773.
- ‘The British Mariner's Assistant, containing forty tables adapted to the several purposes of Trigonometry and Navigation, to which is added an Essay on Logarithms and Navigation Epitomized,’ 1774.
- ‘Mathematical Tables, or Tables of Logarithms,’ 1789.
