= Sarah Gallagher =

Professor of astronomy and former Science Advisor to the Canadian Space Agency

- Education: Penn State
- Known for: Science Advisor to the Canadian Space Agency
- Spouse: Chris Smeenk
- Scientific career
- Fields: Astrophysics
- Workplaces: The University of Western Ontario
- Academic advisors: Niel Brandt

Sarah Connoran Gallagher is an American-Canadian astronomer. She is a professor of astronomy at the University of Western Ontario, where she is the Director of the Western Institute for Earth & Space Exploration. Her research focuses on active galaxies, black holes and compact galaxy groups. From 2018 to 2022, she also served as Science Advisor to the Canadian Space Agency. From 2023 to 2025 she served as the President of the Canadian Astronomical Society (CASCA).

== Education ==
Gallagher obtained her undergraduate degree in physics from Yale University in 1995, followed by a PhD in astronomy and astrophysics from the Pennsylvania State University in 2002. For her PhD research she worked with Niel Brandt on X-ray observations of quasar absorption lines.

== Career ==
Prior to her graduate studies, Gallager was a high-school physics teacher and soccer coach at the Holderness School. After graduation, Gallagher worked at MIT as part of the Chandra X-ray Observatory instrument team. From 2003 to 2006, she was a NASA Spitzer Fellow at UCLA, and then from 2006 to 2008 was an assistant research astronomer at UCLA. In 2008 she became an assistant professor at the University of Western Ontario, and was promoted to associate professor in 2014.

In September 2018, Minister Navdeep Bains appointed Gallagher as the first Science Advisor to the Canadian Space Agency. Her responsibilities include advising the CSA President on science priorities for the Canadian Space Program, representing and promoting the Canadian space science portfolio to other government departments and internationally, communicating the societal impact and breadth of CSA's science investments, and recommending opportunities for the recruitment of young professionals in space science, engineering and other parts of STEM.

== Research ==
Gallagher uses observations from the radio through the X-ray to study quasars and compact galaxy groups, with a particular focus on data from the Spitzer Space Telescope and Chandra X-ray Observatory.

== Honours and awards ==
- 2010 Early Researcher Award, Ontario Ministry of Research and Innovation
- 2003 NASA Spitzer Fellowship
- 2000 NASA Graduate Student Research Program Fellowship
- 1998, 2000 Pennsylvania Space Grant Consortium Fellowship
