= CFHT-BD-Tau 1 =

Brown dwarf in the constellation Taurus

Observation data Epoch J2000 Equinox ICRS
- Constellation: Taurus
- Right ascension: 04^{h} 34^{m} 15.27^{s}
- Declination: +22° 50′ 30.9″

Characteristics
- Spectral type: M7

Astrometry
Distance	~520 ly (~160 pc)

Details
Mass	~0.052 (~55 M_{J}) M_{☉}
Radius	~7.3 R_{J} R_{☉}
Luminosity	0.017–0.04 L_{☉}
Temperature	2,854–3,022 K
Age	~1–4 Myr years

Other designations
- CFHT-BD-Tau J043415.2+225031, [MDM2001] CFHT-BD-Tau 1, 2MASS J04341527+2250309

CFHT-BD-Tau 1 (also catalogued as CFHT-BD-Tau J043415.2+225031 and 2MASS J04341527+2250309) is a young, low-mass brown dwarf located in the Taurus star-forming region within the constellation Taurus. Situated approximately 520 light-years (160 parsecs) from Earth, it is still in an early stage of gravitational contraction, giving it an inflated physical radius estimated at 7.3 times the radius of Jupiter.

== Discovery ==
CFHT-BD-Tau 1 was identified in 2001 by a team of astronomers led by Eduardo L. Martín, Catherine Dougados, and Antonio Magazzù as part of an optical and near-infrared survey for substellar objects in the Taurus star-forming region. Candidates were initially selected using wide-field photometry obtained with the Canada–France–Hawaii Telescope (CFHT) on Mauna Kea, followed by low-resolution optical spectroscopy with the William Herschel Telescope (WHT) and infrared spectroscopy with the Subaru Telescope.

Follow-up high-resolution echelle spectroscopy confirmed its youth and low surface gravity through weak collisionally dominated sodium (Na I) and potassium (K I) absorption lines, distinguishing it from older field red dwarf stars of the same spectral class.

== Physical properties ==
Because the Taurus star-forming region is only a few million years old, CFHT-BD-Tau 1 is actively contracting and remains significantly larger and brighter than mature brown dwarfs of comparable mass.

- Mass and radius: Evolutionary and multiplicity models estimate its mass at approximately 55 Jupiter masses (~0.052 solar masses) and its radius at roughly 7.3 Jupiter radii.
- Spectral type and temperature: It is classified as a late-type M7 object with an effective temperature between 2,854 and 3,022 K.
- X-ray activity and disk status: Unlike its sibling CFHT-BD-Tau 4, CFHT-BD-Tau 1 shows no strong infrared excess indicative of a dense circumstellar disk and does not exhibit active mass accretion. However, X-ray observations have detected powerful coronal flares from the object, demonstrating strong magnetic activity typical of young substellar bodies.

== Environment ==
CFHT-BD-Tau 1 resides in the Group V stellar association of the Taurus Molecular Cloud. Astrometric measurements indicate it may share a wide, common-proper-motion association with the young T Tauri star CI Tauri, separated by 5.36 arcminutes on the sky (corresponding to a projected separation of roughly 51,600 astronomical units at a distance of 160 parsecs).
