= Plumian Professor of Astronomy and Experimental Philosophy =

Professorship at Cambridge University

The Plumian chair of Astronomy and Experimental Philosophy is one of the major professorships in Astronomy at Cambridge University, alongside the Lowndean Professorship (which is now mainly held by mathematicians). The chair is currently held at the Institute of Astronomy in the University. The Plumian chair was founded in 1704 by Thomas Plume, a member of Christ's College and Archdeacon of Rochester, to "erect an Observatory and to maintain a studious and learned Professor of Astronomy and Experimental Philosophy, and to buy him and his successors utensils and instruments quadrants telescopes etc."

Trustees were appointed, and statutes drawn up by Isaac Newton, John Flamsteed and John Ellys. The first Professorship was awarded in 1706 to Roger Cotes, a former student of Newton, and the stipend was increased in 1768 by Dr Robert Smith, the second Plumian Professor.

== Plumian Professors ==
1. Roger Cotes (1706–1716)
2. Robert Smith (1716–1760)
3. Anthony Shepherd (1760–1796)
4. Samuel Vince (1796–1821)
5. Robert Woodhouse (1822–1827)
6. George Biddell Airy (1828–1835)
7. James Challis (1836–1882)
8. George Darwin (1883–1912)
9. Arthur Eddington (1913–1944)
10. Harold Jeffreys (1946–1958)
11. Fred Hoyle (1958–1972)
12. Martin Rees (1973–1991)
13. Richard Ellis (1993–2000)
14. Jeremiah Ostriker (2001–2003)
15. Robert Kennicutt (2006–2017)
16. Christopher S. Reynolds (2017–2023)
17. Sera Markoff (2025– )

== Sources ==
- R. A. Doe & C. C. Thornton, Dr Thomas Plume, 1630–1704. His life and legacies in Essex, Kent and Cambridge, University of Hertfordshire Press, 2020
