= Thomas Sprague =

Thomas Sprague may refer to:

- Thomas L. Sprague (1894–1972), United States Navy admiral
- Thomas Archibald Sprague (1877–1958), Scottish botanist
- Thomas Bond Sprague (1830–1920), British actuary, barrister and amateur mathematician
