= John R. Parker =

British mathematician

- Born: John Robert Parker
- Education: Durham University (BSc); University of Cambridge (PhD)
- Spouse: Chris Done
- Scientific career
- Fields: Geometry
- Workplaces: Durham University
- Thesis: 2-generator Möbius groups (1989)
- Website: https://www.maths.dur.ac.uk/users/j.r.parker/

John Robert Parker is a British mathematician. He is Professor of Mathematics at Durham University.

Parker graduated with a first-class degree in mathematics from Durham University in 1984. He subsequently completed Part III of the Mathematical Tripos at the University of Cambridge, later earning his PhD from the same institution in 1989.

== Career and research ==
Parker describes his main research interests as discrete groups and hyperbolic geometry.

Between January 2013 and December 2022 he was joint editor-in-chief, with Jean-Marc Schlenker, of Geometriae Dedicata. In 2024, he was a visiting faculty member at AIMS Ghana, where he taught a course on hyperbolic geometry.

== Personal ==
Parker is the husband of astronomer Chris Done. He is a church elder and has experience running Alpha courses.

== Selected publications ==
=== Conference papers ===
- Parker, J. R. (2009). Dekimpe, K.; Igodt, P.; Valette, A. (eds.). Complex hyperbolic lattices (PDF). Discrete groups and geometric structures: Workshop on Discrete Groups and Geometric Structures, with Applications III, May 26–30, 2008, Kortrijk, Belgium. American Mathematical Society. pp. 1–42.

=== Journal articles ===
- Falbel, E.; Parker, J. R. (2006). "The geometry of the Eisenstein-Picard modular group". Duke Mathematical Journal. 131 (2): 249–289. doi:10.1215/s0012-7094-06-13123-x.
- Parker, J.; Platis, I. (2008). "Complex hyperbolic Fenchel–Nielsen coordinates". Topology. 47 (2): 101–135. doi:10.1016/j.top.2007.08.001.
- Deraux, M.; Parker, J. R.; Paupert, J. (2016). "New non-arithmetic complex hyperbolic lattices". Inventiones Mathematicae. 203 (3): 681–771. arXiv:1401.0308. doi:10.1007/s00222-015-0600-1.
