= Christopher Pope =

Christopher Pope may refer to:

- Christopher Pope (physicist)
- Christopher Pope (politician)
- Chris Pope (rugby union)

== See also ==
- Chris Pope, American internet personality
