= Robert D. Mathieu =

American astronomer and science educator

Robert D. Mathieu is an astronomer and science educator who works at the Center for the Integration of Research, Teaching, and Learning (CIRTL).

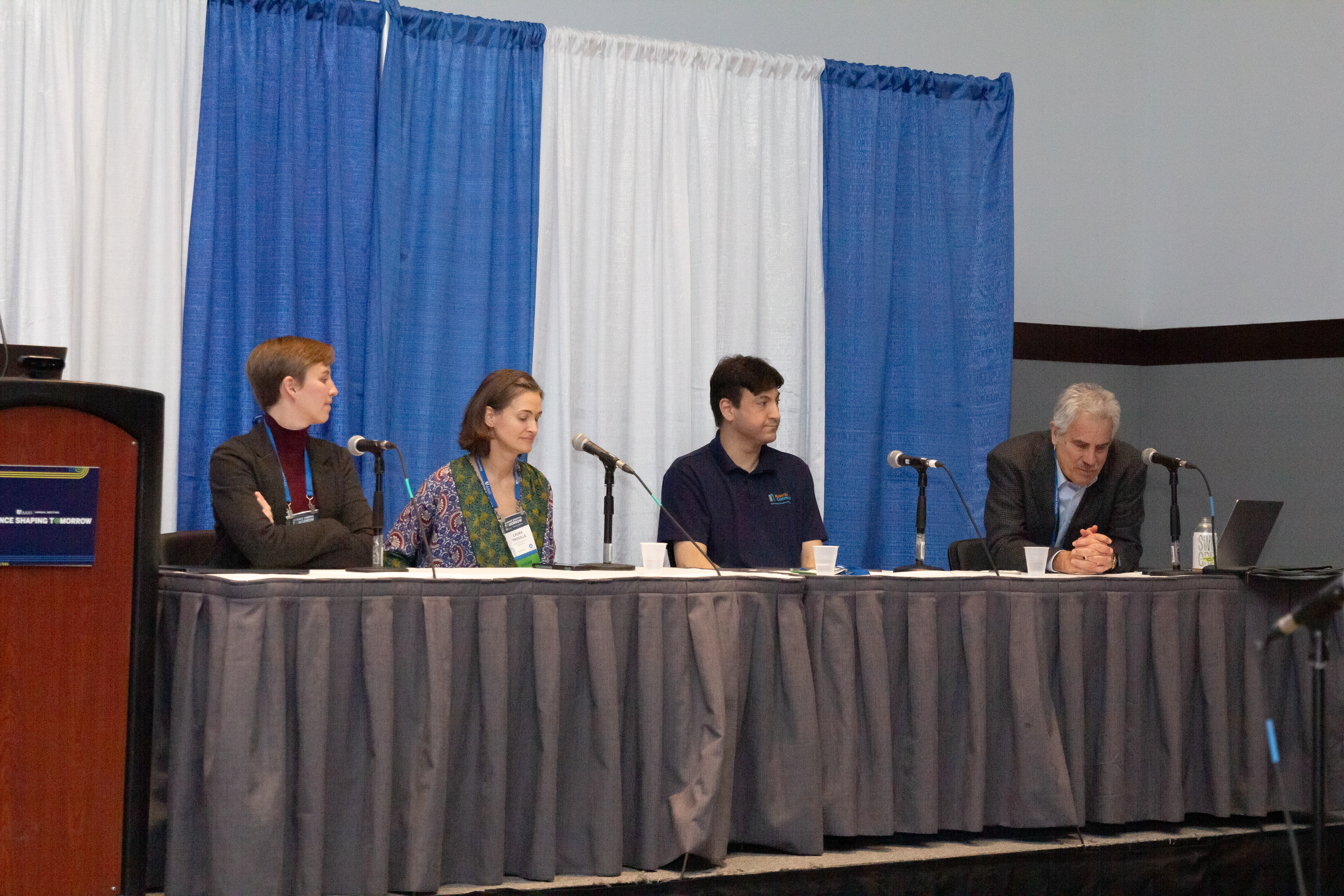
Mathieu (r) at AAAS 2025

Recently, Mathieu led U.S. national initiatives for the improvement of science higher education. From 1998 to 2000 he was the associate director of the National Institute for Science Education, and led the development of the Field-tested Learning Assessment Guide (FLAG) and other resources for science, engineering, and mathematics faculty.

Mathieu has been on the faculty of the Department of Astronomy of the University of Wisconsin–Madison since 1987, where he has been the recipient of a UW Distinguished Teaching Award. He was educated at Princeton University and the University of California, Berkeley, after which he became a Fellow of the Center for Astrophysics | Harvard & Smithsonian. He has received a Presidential Young Researcher award and a Guggenheim Fellowship for his research into the dynamics of star clusters and the formation of binary stars. He currently serves as President of the Board of Directors of the WIYN Observatory.

== Selected works ==
- Clarke, Cathie J.; Mathieu, Robert D.; Reid, I. Neill (2015). Dynamics of young star clusters and associations: Saas-Fee advanced course 42. Berlin: Springer. ISBN 978-3662472897.
