= Chris Done =

British astrophysicist (born 1964)

- Born: February 3, 1964 (age 62)
- Education: University of St Andrews (BSc); University of Cambridge (PhD)
- Spouse: John R. Parker
- Scientific career
- Fields: Astrophysics
- Workplaces: Durham University
- Thesis: Nonthermal continuum processes in compact objects (1989)
- Doctoral advisor: Andrew Fabian

Christine Done (born 3 February 1964) is a British astrophysicist. She has been a Professor of Physics at Durham University since 2006.

Done graduated from St. Andrews University in 1986 with a first-class degree in Astronomy, Astrophysics and Theoretical Physics. She completed her PhD at Cambridge University in 1989 as a Carnegie Scholar. Her doctoral advisor was Andrew Fabian.

== Career and research ==
Done is a specialist in X-ray astronomy, particularly in relation to black holes. In addition to her faculty position at Durham, she is also a non-stipendiary Visiting Professor at the Kavli Institute for the Physics and Mathematics of the Universe in Kashiwa, Japan, having spent the academic year 2016/2017 on a sabbatical working with the Japanese Space Agency.

She received the 2019 George Darwin Lectureship from the Royal Astronomical Society.

== Personal ==
Done is a practicing Christian and a member of the steering group for Equipping Christian Leadership in an Age of Science (ECLAS). She appeared on an April 2017 episode of Lent Talks, where she discussed her views on science and faith.

== Selected publications ==
- Stecker, F.; Done, C.; Salamon, M.; Sommers, P. (1991). "High-energy neutrinos from active galactic nuclei". Physical Review Letters. 66 (21): 2697–2700. doi:10.1103/PhysRevLett.66.2697. PMID 10043593.
- Done, C.; Gierliński, M.; Kubota, A. (2007). "Modelling the behaviour of accretion flows in X-ray binaries". Astronomy and Astrophysics Review. 15 (1): 1–66. arXiv:0708.0148. doi:10.1007/s00159-007-0006-1.
- Done, C.; Davis, S.; Jin, C.; Blaes, O.; Ward, M. (2012). "Intrinsic disc emission and the soft X-ray excess in active galactic nuclei". Monthly Notices of the Royal Astronomical Society. 420 (3): 1848–1860. arXiv:1107.5429. doi:10.1111/j.1365-2966.2011.19779.x.
- Kubota, A.; Done, C. (2018). "A physical model of the broadband continuum of AGN and its implications for the UV/X relation and optical variability". Monthly Notices of the Royal Astronomical Society. 480 (1): 1247–1262. arXiv:1804.00171. doi:10.1093/mnras/sty1890.
