= James E. Owen =

Astrophysicist

James Owen
- Education: University of Cambridge (Ph.D. 2011) University of Cambridge (M.Sci 2008)
- Known for: Small planet radius gap
- Awards: RAS Fowler Award (2021)
- Scientific career
- Fields: Astrophysics, exoplanets
- Workplaces: Imperial College London
- Doctoral advisor: Cathie Clarke

James E. Owen is an astrophysicist at Imperial College London who studies exoplanets and accretion disks.

== Career ==
James Owen graduated with M.Sci. degree in Natural Sciences from Churchill College, University of Cambridge in 2008. He then undertook his Ph.D. at the Institute of Astronomy, Cambridge under the supervision of Professor Cathie Clarke. He was a post-doctoral fellow at the Canadian Institute for Theoretical Astrophysics from 2011 to 2014 and then a NASA Hubble Fellow at the Institute for Advanced Study from 2014 to 2017. In 2017 he joined Imperial College, first as a Royal Society University Research Fellow and is currently a senior lecturer in exoplanet physics. In collaboration with Yanqin Wu, James Owen studied the photoevaporation of exoplanet atmospheres, predicting the existence of the Small planet radius gap in 2013, four years before its confirmation.

== Awards ==
In 2019 he was awarded an ERC starting grant to further his studies of exoplanet atmospheres. In 2021 he was award the Royal Astronomical Society's Fowler award for early achievement in astronomy for his prediction of the exoplanet radius gap.

== Most cited articles ==
- Owen JE, Wu Y. Kepler planets: a tale of evaporation. The Astrophysical Journal 2013 Sep 12;775(2):105. (Cited 481 times, according to Google Scholar)
- Owen JE, Wu Y. The evaporation valley in the Kepler planets. The Astrophysical Journal. 2017 Sep 20;847(1):29. (Cited 398 times, according to Google Scholar.)
- Owen JE, Ercolano B, Clarke CJ. Protoplanetary disc evolution and dispersal: the implications of X-ray photoevaporation. Monthly Notices of the Royal Astronomical Society. 2011 Mar 21;412(1):13-25. (Cited 291 times, according to Google Scholar.)
- .Owen JE, Jackson AP. Planetary evaporation by UV and X-ray radiation: basic hydrodynamics. Monthly Notices of the Royal Astronomical Society. 2012 Oct 1;425(4):2931-47. (Cited 260imes, according to Google Scholar.)
