= Christopher S. Reynolds =

British-American astronomer

Christopher Reynolds
- Born: Christopher Stephen Reynolds
- Education: Trinity College, Cambridge
- Scientific career
- Fields: High-energy astronomy
- Workplaces: University of Cambridge; University of Colorado Boulder; University of Maryland
- Thesis: X-ray emission and absorption in active galaxies (1996)
- Doctoral advisor: Andrew Fabian

Christopher Stephen Reynolds is a British-American astronomer who is a distinguished professor of Astronomy at the University of Maryland. He was formerly the Plumian Professor of Astronomy and Experimental Philosophy at the Institute of Astronomy in the University of Cambridge.

== Education ==
Reynolds undertook his undergraduate studies at Trinity College, Cambridge. He received a Bachelor's in Theoretical Physics in 1992 and a Master's in Mathematics in 1993, winning the Tyson medal. He remained in Cambridge to pursue his PhD under Andrew Fabian at the Institute of Astronomy, where he graduated in 1996 with his thesis entitled X-ray emission and absorption in active galaxies.

== Career ==
In 1993 Reynolds moved to JILA at the University of Colorado Boulder, where he remained for five years, the final three as a Hubble Fellow. In 2001, he was appointed assistant professor at the University of Maryland, being promoted to Associate and Full Professor in 2005 and 2009 respectively. He was appointed the Plumian Professor of Astronomy and Experimental Philosophy at the Institute of Astronomy, Cambridge in 2017. He served as deputy director of the institute from 2018 to 2022 and was a fellow of Sidney Sussex College. He returned to his current position in Maryland in 2023. He is the Principal Investigator of the Advanced X-Ray Imaging Satellite.
