= Niel Brandt =

American astronomer

W. Niel Brandt
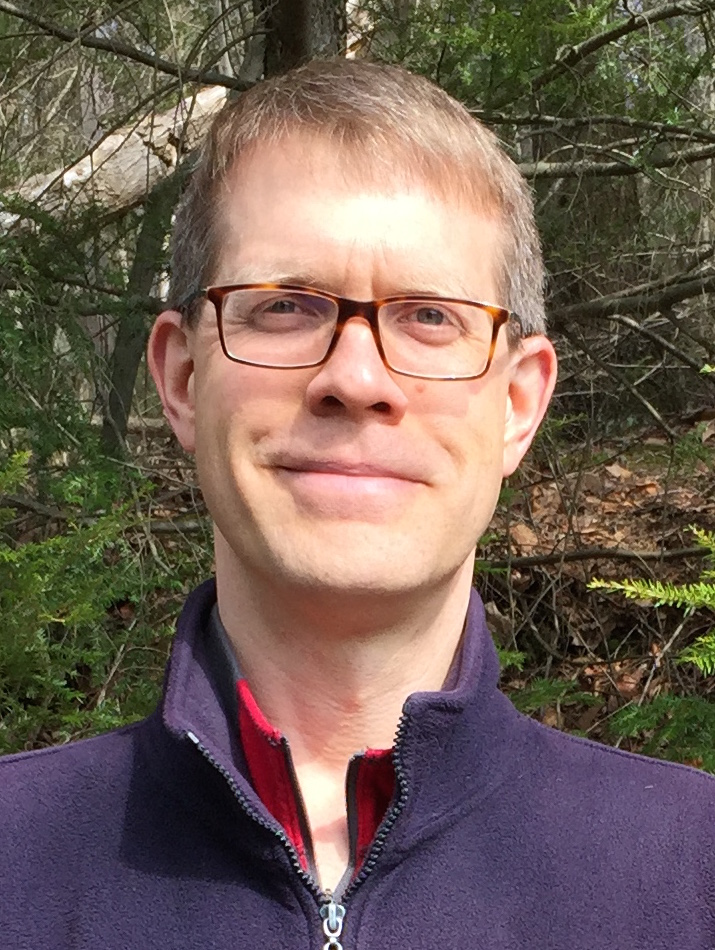
- Niel Brandt in State College, PA in 2015
- Born: June 10, 1970 (age 56); Durham, North Carolina
- Education: California Institute of Technology; University of Cambridge
- Scientific career
- Fields: Astronomy & Astrophysics, Physics
- Workplaces: The Pennsylvania State University
- Doctoral advisor: Andrew Fabian

William Nielsen Brandt (born June 10, 1970; also known as Niel Brandt) is the Verne M. Willaman Professor of Astronomy & Astrophysics and a professor of physics at the Pennsylvania State University. He has worked on active galaxies, cosmological X-ray surveys, starburst galaxies, normal galaxies and X-ray binaries.

== Education ==
Brandt was born in Durham, North Carolina, but grew up in Janesville, Wisconsin. He attended Milton High School in Milton, Wisconsin, and Phillips Exeter Academy in Exeter, New Hampshire. His undergraduate studies were at the California Institute of Technology (B.S. 1992), where he was awarded the George Green Prize for Creative Scholarship. His graduate studies were done at the Institute of Astronomy, Cambridge with Andrew Fabian, earning his PhD in 1996.

== Career ==
From 1996 to 1997 Brandt held a postdoctoral fellowship at the Center for Astrophysics | Harvard & Smithsonian where he worked with colleagues including Martin Elvis and Belinda Wilkes. In 1997, he took up an assistant professor appointment at the Pennsylvania State University. He was promoted to associate professor in 2001, full professor in 2003, Distinguished Professor in 2010, and Verne M. Willaman Professor in 2014.

== Research and teaching ==
Brandt's research focuses on observational studies of supermassive black holes (SMBHs) and cosmological X-ray surveys. His reviews of extragalactic X-ray surveys were influential. Specific objects investigated include actively accreting SMBHs (i.e., active galactic nuclei: AGNs), starburst galaxies, and normal galaxies. His work uses data from the Chandra X-ray Observatory, XMM-Newton, NuSTAR and the Sloan Digital Sky Survey. He is involved with projects including the Large Synoptic Survey Telescope, the Advanced Telescope for High Energy Astrophysics (ATHENA), and X-ray missions such as the proposed space mission STAR-X

Brandt has a YouTube page cataloguing his lectures and discussions of his research.

== Personal life ==
Brandt is married to Gretchen Brandt, a local Democrat politician.

== Selected awards ==
- Caltech George Green Prize for Creative Scholarship, 1992
- NSF Graduate Research Fellowship, 1994–1996
- Sloan Fellowship, 1999–2004
- NSF Faculty Early Career Development (CAREER) Award, 2000–2005
- Newton Lacy Pierce Prize in Astronomy, 2004
- Fellow of the American Physical Society, 2009
- Bruno Rossi Prize, 2016
- Elected a Legacy Fellow of the American Astronomical Society, 2020
