= Sverre Aarseth =

Norwegian astronomer (1934–2024)

- Born: 20 July 1934
- Died: 28 December 2024 (aged 90)
- Education: University of Cambridge
- Known for: N-body dynamics
- Awards: Brouwer Award (1998)
- Scientific career
- Fields: Astronomy
- Workplaces: Institute of Astronomy, Cambridge
- Doctoral students: Douglas C. Heggie; Elena Terlevich

Sverre Johannes Aarseth (20 July 1934 – 28 December 2024) was a Norwegian research scientist at the Institute of Astronomy at the University of Cambridge. Aarseth spent his retirement as an active researcher. He dedicated his career to the development of N-body codes ("a code" in astrophysical jargon refers to a computer program or library or a group thereof). He is the author of the NBODY family of codes, the current iteration is NBODY7. His areas of research included the effects of stellar evolution in N-body codes, the influence of black holes on stellar systems, the evolution of globular clusters, and the use of GPUs to increase the speed of his codes.

Aarseth was a visiting scholar at the Institute for Advanced Study in 1986–87. He was awarded the 1998 Brouwer Award for his work on advancing dynamical astronomy. The asteroid 9836 Aarseth is named in his honour.

Outside of research, Aarseth's interests included mountaineering, trekking and wildlife. He is also a keen chess player, and was awarded the title International Master for Correspondence in 1981. Aarseth died on 28 December 2024, at the age of 90.
