= Cathie Clarke =

Astrophysicist

Cathie Clarke FRS
- Born: Catherine Jane Clarke
- Education: University of Oxford (DPhil)
- Awards: Eddington Medal (2017)
- Scientific career
- Fields: Star formation Exoplanets
- Institutions: University of Cambridge
- Thesis: Accretion disc structure in binary star and galactic potentials (1987)
- Doctoral advisor: Geoffrey Bath
- Doctoral students: James E. Owen
- Website: www.ast.cam.ac.uk/people/cathie.j.clarke

Catherine Jane Clarke FRS is a Professor of Theoretical Astrophysics at the University of Cambridge and a fellow of Clare College, Cambridge. In 2017 she became the first woman to be awarded the Eddington Medal by the Royal Astronomical Society. In 2022 she became the first female director of the Institute of Astronomy, Cambridge.

== Education ==
Clarke matriculated in 1980 to study the Natural Sciences tripos at Clare College, Cambridge where she completed her undergraduate education in 1983. She was subsequently educated at the University of Oxford where she received a Doctor of Philosophy degree in 1987 for research on binary stars supervised by Geoffrey Bath. Her doctoral thesis was titled "Accretion disc structure in binary star and galactic potentials".

== Career and research ==
Clarke studies astrophysical fluid dynamics, including accretion and protoplanetary discs and stellar winds. She was the first to demonstrate how protoplanetary disc formation around low-mass young stars is determined by their radiation field. This removes material from the disc and is integral for various models of planet formation and migration. Clarke uses hydrodynamical simulations to study the physics of photoevaporation.

In 2001 she was awarded the University of Cambridge Pilkington Prize for teaching and learning. She co-authored the Principles of Astrophysical Fluid Dynamics textbook with Bob Carswell in 2014. It is a primer for the fluid dynamics required to understand astronomical phenomena. She developed the course in 1996, and delivered it as part of Part II Astrophysics between 1996 and 1999. She contributed to the book Dynamics of Young Star Clusters and Associations in 2015.

Her recent work has combined analytical observation and hydrodynamical simulations in exoplanet discovery. She demonstrated the first evidence of external disc photoevaporation in a low-mass star in 2017. The star studied was IM Lupi, which was shown to have a CO (carbon monoxide) halo that extends beyond 1,000 AU.

Clarke identified a young star with four planets, the size of Jupiter and Saturn, in orbit around it. The star, CI Tauri, hosts the first hot Jupiter candidate in a protoplanetary disc system. She used the Atacama Large Millimeter Array to search for nearby planets. The closest is in an equivalent orbit to Mercury, whilst the furthest has an orbit three times that of Neptune. The two outer planets are similar masses to the sun. She demonstrated that proximity to nearby stars impacts the lifetime of protoplanetary discs. She serves as editor of the Elsevier Journal, New Astronomy Reviews. She is a member of the International Astronomical Union.

Clarke's other research interests include self-gravity in disc evolution and formation of brown dwarfs in unstable multiple systems.

=== Awards and honours ===
In 2017, Clarke was awarded the Eddington Medal by the Royal Astronomical Society; she is the first woman to win this medal. She was elected a Fellow of the Royal Society in 2023.

=== Publications ===
- Clarke, Cathie; Carswell, Bob (2007). Principles of astrophysical fluid dynamics. Cambridge: Cambridge University Press. ISBN 978-0521853316.
- Clarke, Cathie J.; Mathieu, Robert D.; Reid, I. Neill (2015). Dynamics of young star clusters and associations: Saas-Fee advanced course 42. Berlin: Springer. ISBN 978-3662472897.
