= Andrew Fabian =

British X-ray astronomer

Andrew Fabian OBE FRS
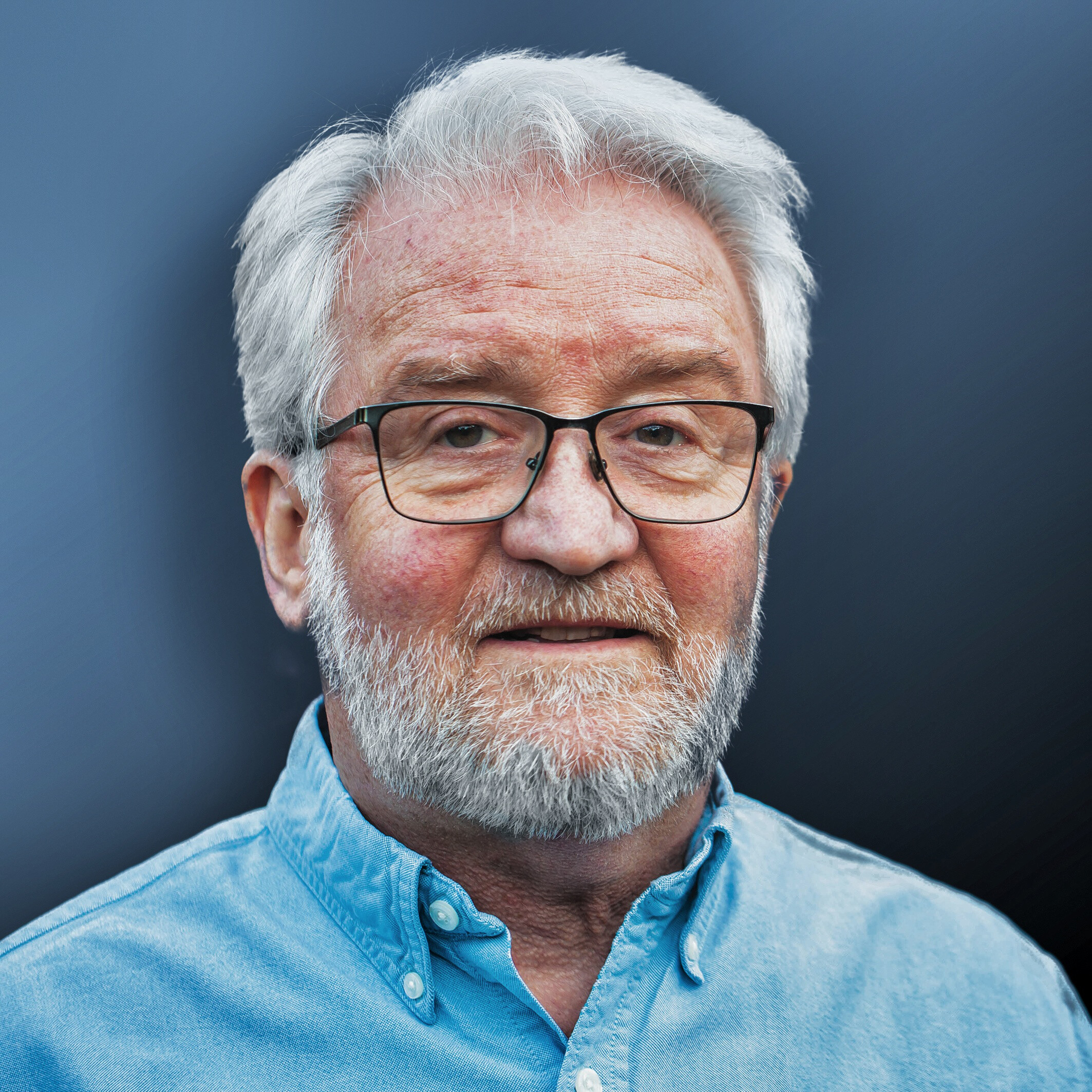

86th President of the Royal Astronomical Society
- In office 2008–2010
- Preceded by: Michael Rowan-Robinson
- Succeeded by: Roger Davies

Personal details
- Born: Andrew Christopher Fabian; 20 February 1948 (age 78)
- Spouse: Carolin Crawford (m. 1991)
- Website: www.csap.cam.ac.uk/network/andrew-fabian
- Scientific career
- Education: Daventry Grammar school King's College London (BSc); University College, London (PhD)
- Awards: Bruno Rossi Prize (2001); Dannie Heineman Prize for Astrophysics (2008); Gold Medal of the Royal Astronomical Society (2012); Bruce Medal (2016); Kavli Prize (2020)
- Fields: Astronomy
- Workplaces: Institute of Astronomy, Cambridge; University of Cambridge
- Thesis: The small scale isotropy of the cosmic X-ray background (1972)
- Doctoral advisor: Peter W. Sanford
- Doctoral students: Niel Brandt; Carolin Crawford; Tiziana Di Matteo; Chris Done; Christopher S. Reynolds

Andrew Christopher Fabian (born 20 February 1948) is a British astronomer and astrophysicist. He was Director of the Institute of Astronomy, University of Cambridge from 2013 to 2018. He was a Royal Society Research Professor at the Institute of Astronomy, Cambridge from 1982 to 2013, and Vice-Master of Darwin College, Cambridge from 1997 to 2012. He served as president of the Royal Astronomical Society from May 2008 through to 2010.

== Education ==
Fabian was educated at King's College London (BSc, Physics) and the Mullard Space Science Laboratory at University College London (PhD).

== Career and research ==
Fabian was Gresham Professor of Astronomy at Gresham College, a position in which he delivered free public lectures within the City of London between 1982 and 1984. He was editor-in-chief of the astronomy journal Monthly Notices of the Royal Astronomical Society from 1994–2008.

His areas of research include galaxy clusters, active galactic nuclei, strong gravity, black holes and the X-ray background. He has also worked on X-ray binaries, neutron stars and supernova remnants in the past. Much of his research involves X-ray astronomy and high energy astrophysics. His notable achievements include his involvement in the discovery of broad iron lines emitted from active galactic nuclei, for which he was jointly awarded the Bruno Rossi Prize. He is author of over 1000 refereed articles and head of the X-ray astronomy group at the Institute of Astronomy.

=== Awards and honours ===
Fabian was awarded the Dannie Heineman Prize for Astrophysics by the American Astronomical Society in 2008, the Gold Medal of the Royal Astronomical Society in 2012, and the Kavli Prize for Astrophysics in 2020.

In 2016 he was elected as a foreign associate of the National Academy of Sciences and awarded the Bruce Gold Medal by the Astronomical Society of the Pacific.

In August 2020 Fabian was a guest on the BBC Radio 4 programme 'The Life Scientific'.
