= 15810 Arawn =

Kuiper belt object observed by New Horizons

- A distant view of Arawn (center) from New Horizons in November 2015. (Note: This four-frame animation depicting Arawn was taken on 2 November 2015, by New Horizons, when the spacecraft was 270 million km (170 million mi) away. Arawn is the white dot, just left of center, moving from right to left.)

Discovery
- Discovered by: M. J. Irwin; A. Żytkow
- Discovery site: La Palma Obs.
- Discovery date: 12 May 1994

Designations
- Pronunciation: /ˈɑːraʊn/, with the PASTA vowel
- Named after: Arawn (Welsh mythology)
- Alternative designations: 1994 JR_{1}
- Minor planet category: TNO · plutino

Orbital characteristics
- Epoch 16 February 2017 (JD 2457800.5)
- Uncertainty parameter 2
- Observation arc: 21.91 yr (8,002 days)
- Aphelion: 44.241 AU
- Perihelion: 34.720 AU
- Semi-major axis: 39.480 AU
- Eccentricity: 0.1206
- Orbital period (sidereal): 248.07 yr (90,609 days)
- Mean anomaly: 30.638°
- Mean motion: 0° 0^{m} 14.4^{s} / day
- Inclination: 3.8074°
- Longitude of ascending node: 144.69°
- Argument of perihelion: 101.89°
- Known satellites: 0

Physical characteristics
- Dimensions: 133 km (83 mi); 145 km (90 mi)
- Synodic rotation period: 5.47±0.33 h
- Geometric albedo: 0.04
- Absolute magnitude (H): 7.6

15810 Arawn (provisional designation 1994 JR_{1}) is a trans-Neptunian object (TNO) from the inner regions of the Kuiper belt, approximately 133 kilometres (83 mi) in diameter. It belongs to the plutinos, the most populous class of resonant TNOs. It was named after Arawn, the ruler of the Otherworld in Welsh mythology, and was discovered on 12 May 1994, by astronomers Michael Irwin and Anna Żytkow with the 2.5-metre Isaac Newton Telescope at Roque de los Muchachos Observatory in the Canary Islands, Spain.

Arawn is unusual in that it has been observed at a much closer distance than most Kuiper belt objects, by the New Horizons spacecraft, which imaged it from a distance of 111 million km (69 million mi; 0.74 AU) in April 2016; this and its other observations have allowed its rotation period to be determined.

== Orbit and physical properties ==
Arawn is moving in a relatively eccentric orbit entirely beyond the orbit of Neptune. With a semi-major axis of 39.4 AU, it orbits the Sun once every 247 years and 6 months (90,409 days). Its orbit has a perihelion (closest approach to the Sun) of 34.7 AU, an aphelion (farthest distance from the Sun) of 44.1 AU, an eccentricity of 0.12, and an inclination of 4° with respect to the ecliptic. It is a plutino, being trapped in a 2:3 mean motion resonance with Neptune, similarly to dwarf planet Pluto, the largest known plutino.

It measures approximately 133 km (83 mi) in diameter, based on an absolute magnitude of 7.6, and an estimated albedo of 0.1. Observations by the Hubble Space Telescope show that Arawn has a very red surface. In April 2016, its rotation period of 5.47 hours was determined.

== Quasi-satellite dynamical state and orbital evolution ==
In 2012 Arawn was hypothesized to be in a quasi-satellite loop around Pluto, as part of a recurring pattern, becoming a Plutonian quasi-satellite every 2 Myr and remaining in that phase for nearly 350,000 years. Measurements made by the New Horizons probe in 2015 increased the accuracy of calculations of the motion of Arawn. These calculations confirm the general dynamics described in the hypotheses. However, whether this motion means that Arawn should be classified as a quasi-satellite of Pluto remains debated, because Arawn's orbit is primarily controlled by Neptune with only occasional smaller perturbations caused by Pluto.

== Origin ==
Arawn is moving in a very stable orbit, likely as stable as Pluto's. This suggests that it might be a primordial plutino formed around the same time Pluto itself and Charon came into existence. It is unlikely to be relatively recent debris that originated in collisions within Pluto's system or a captured object.

== Observation ==
Arawn is currently relatively close to Pluto. In 2017 it was only 2.7 AU from Pluto. Before 486958 Arrokoth was discovered in 2014, Arawn was the best known target for a flyby by the New Horizons spacecraft after its Pluto flyby in 2015.

Arawn was one of the first objects targeted for distant observations by New Horizons, which were taken on 2 November 2015. More observations were made in April 2016.

On 2 November 2015, Arawn was imaged by the LORRI instrument aboard New Horizons, and was therefore 1/15 the distance of the previous nearest observation of a Kuiper belt object other than the Pluto–Charon system.

Between 7–8 April 2016, New Horizons imaged Arawn from a new record distance of about 111 million kilometres, using the LORRI instrument. The new images allowed the science team at Southwest Research Institute (SwRI) in Boulder, Colorado, to further pinpoint the location of Arawn to within 1000 kilometers. The new data also enabled calculation that its rotation period is about 5.47 hours.

On 15 April 2024, the James Webb Space Telescope (JWST) conducted an observation of Arawn for a duration of 1 minute and 4 seconds using its NIRCam instrument in Moving Target mode with published findings expected at a later date.

April 2016 observations of Arawn by New Horizons

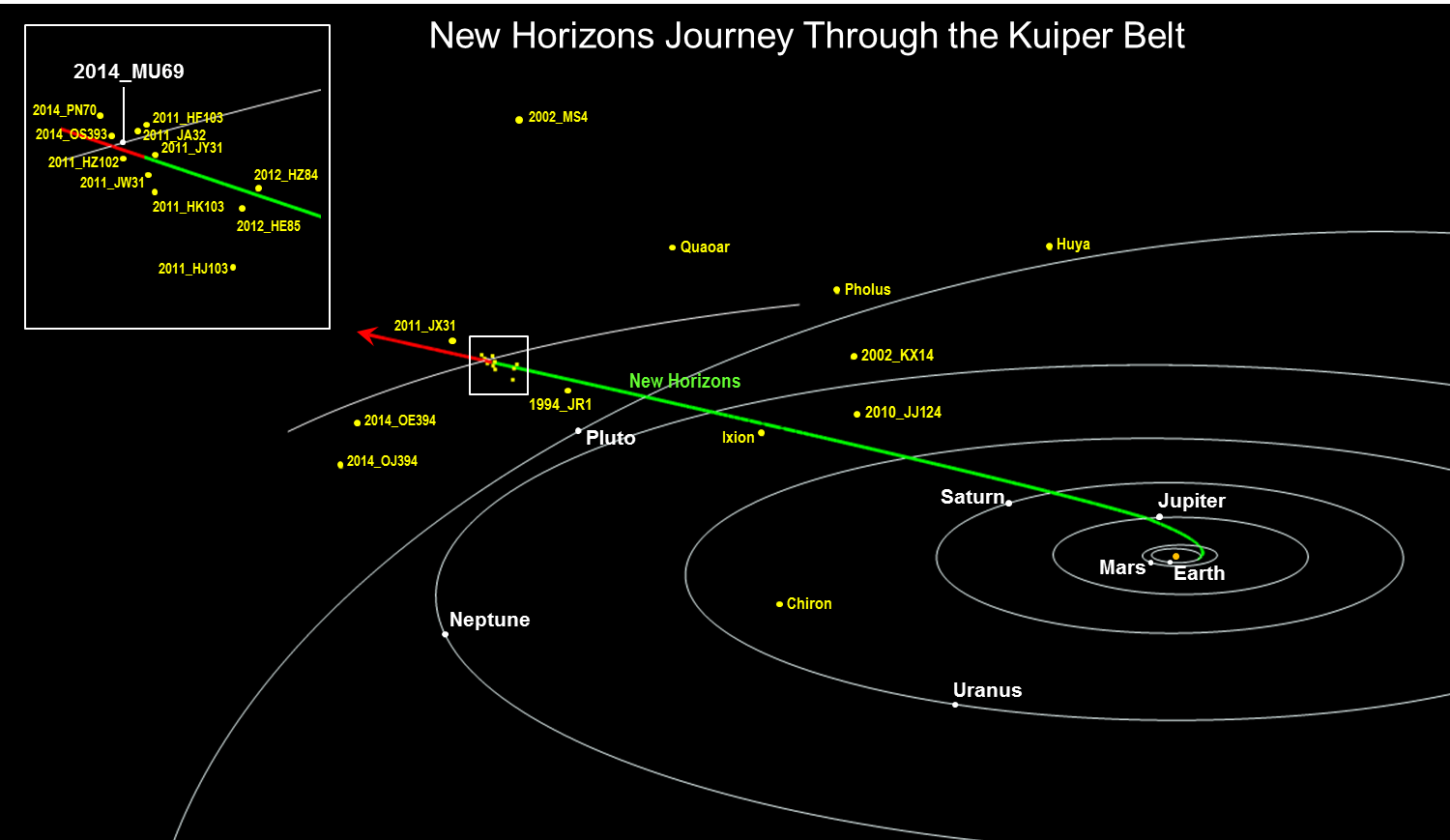
Trajectory of New Horizons and other nearby Kuiper belt objects, with Arawn as 1994 JR_{1}.

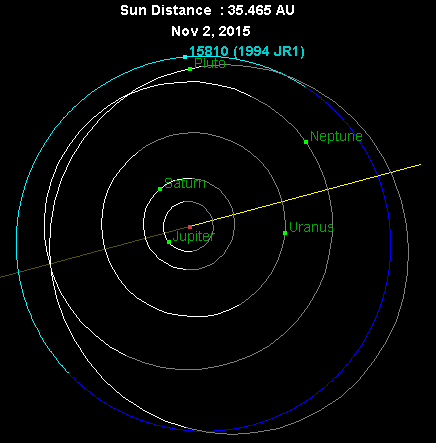
Orbit of Arawn near Pluto

Arawn occulted a star on 25 August 2022.

== See also ==
- Kuiper belt
- List of trans-Neptunian objects
