= Anna N. Żytkow =

Polish astrophysicist

- Born: 21 February 1947 (age 79); Poland
- Education: University of Warsaw
- Known for: Thorne–Żytkow object
- Scientific career
- Fields: Astrophysics
- Workplaces: Institute of Astronomy, Cambridge of the University of Cambridge

Anna Nikola Żytkow (Polish pronunciation: [ˈanna ˈʐɨtkɔf]; born 21 February 1947) is a Polish astrophysicist working at the Institute of Astronomy of the University of Cambridge. Żytkow and Kip Thorne proposed a model for what is called the Thorne–Żytkow object, which is a star within another star. Żytkow in 2014 was part of the team led by Emily M. Levesque which discovered the first candidate for such an object.

== Thorne-Żytkow objects ==
Working together with Kip Thorne in 1976, Żytkow developed a theoretical model for a new star type, the Thorne–Żytkow object (TŻO), which contains either a neutron star or a black hole core at the center of a stellar envelope. The evolution of such a star occurs rarely and only two processes exist that define the structure and evolution of a TŻO. In the first process a collision between a neutron star and a normal star, either dwarf or giant, must occur in order to merge the two into a single object. This occurrence is rare since stars do not usually collide with each other. This could only happen in a dense cluster of stars. The second possible evolution of a larger TŻO can occur when a star expands into a red supergiant and engulfs its companion neutron star.

A team led by Emily Levesque (University of Colorado at Boulder) and including Anna Żytkow found the first viable TŻO candidate using the 6.5-meter Magellan Clay Telescope at the Las Campanas Observatory in 2014.

Żytkow said upon the discovery: "I am extremely happy that observational confirmation of our theoretical prediction has started to emerge. Since Kip Thorne and I proposed our models of stars with neutron cores, people were not able to disprove our work. If theory is sound, experimental confirmation shows up sooner or later. So it was a matter of identification of a promising group of stars, getting telescope time and proceeding with the project."

== Personal life ==
Żytkow's career was interrupted by a mountaineering accident that nearly took her life.

== Kuiper belt discoveries ==
Minor planets discovered: 7
| (8012) 1990 HO_{3} | 29 April 1990 | list |
| (8361) 1990 JN_{1} | 1 May 1990 | list |
| 15810 Arawn | 12 May 1994 | list |
| (16684) 1994 JQ1 | 11 May 1994 | list |
| (48443) 1990 HY_{5} | 29 April 1990 | list |
| (58165) 1990 HQ_{5} | 29 April 1990 | list |
| (73682) 1990 HU_{5} | 29 April 1990 | list |
all co-discovered with Mike Irwin

In December 1995, Mike Irwin, Scott Tremaine, and Anna N. Żytkow collaborated on the survey of two slow-moving objects, which are probable members of the Kuiper belt. Żytkow and the group followed Edgeworth (1949) and Kuipers (1951) research, which indicates that protoplanetary disks extend beyond Neptune and that the disk material beyond Neptune had not coalesced into planets. This group of planetesimals is now known as the Kuiper belt. Żytkow and the rest of the group members spent most of their time adjusting the focus of the camera and instruments attached to the Isaac Newton Telescope (INT). The group used the Monte Carlo method, which provided multiple simulations in two separate stages. The first stage is the detection rate for images that came from INT as a function of magnitude, which was investigated using artificial images adding to the original frames. The second stage involved examining the detection rate for a series of artificial images from INT that followed the typical slow moving solar system objects (SMO) track. The outcome of this survey was a detection of two new Kuiper belts objects within the area of 0.7 degree sq. to a limiting magnitude mR=23.5.

== Publications ==
- Worley, Clare C.; Irwin, Mike J.; Tout, Christopher; Żytkow, Anna N.; Fraser, Morgan; Izzard, Robert G. (March 2016). "The proper motion of HV2112: a TŻO candidate in the SMC". Monthly Notices of the Royal Astronomical Society Letters. 459: L31–L35. arXiv:1602.08479. doi:10.1093/mnrasl/slw034.
- Levesque, Emily M.; Massey, Philip; Żytkow, Anna N.; Morrell, Nidia (January 2014). A Search for Thorne-Zytkow Objects. American Astronomical Society Meeting 223. Bibcode:2014AAS...22311306L.
- Tout, Christopher; Zytkow, Anna N.; Church, Ross P.; Lau, Herbert Ho Bun (23 June 2014). "HV2112, a Thorne-Zytkow Object or a Super Asymptotic Giant Branch Star". Monthly Notices of the Royal Astronomical Society Letters. 445: L36–L40. arXiv:1406.6064. doi:10.1093/mnrasl/slu131.
- Levesque, Emily M.; Massey, Philip; Zytkow, Anna N.; Morrell, Nidia (September 2014). "Discovery of a Thorne-Zytkow object candidate in the Small Magellanic Cloud". Monthly Notices of the Royal Astronomical Society Letters. 443: L94–L98. arXiv:1406.0001. Bibcode:2014MNRAS.443L..94L. doi:10.1093/mnrasl/slu080.
- Ball, Warrick H.; Tout, Christopher; Żytkow, Anna N. (January 2012). "Quasi-stars, giants and the Schönberg–Chandrasekhar (SC) limit". Monthly Notices of the Royal Astronomical Society. 421 (3): 2713–2721. arXiv:1201.5560. Bibcode:2012MNRAS.421.2713B. doi:10.1111/j.1365-2966.2012.20508.x.
- Irwin, Mike; Żytkow, Anna N. (1 July 1993). "A variable star in the vicinity of the soft γ-ray repeater 1806 – 20". Monthly Notices of the Royal Astronomical Society. 263 (1): L1–L5. Bibcode:1993MNRAS.263L...1I. doi:10.1093/mnras/263.1.L1.
- Cannon, Robert C.; Eggleton, P. P.; Zytkow, A. N.; Podsiadlowski, P. (10 February 1992). "The structure and evolution of Thorne-Zytkow objects". Astrophysical Journal. 386: 206. Bibcode:1992ApJ...386..206C. doi:10.1086/171006.
- Eich, Chris; Zimmermann, Mark E.; Thorne, Kip S.; Zytkow, Anna N. (1 November 1989). "Giant and supergiant stars with degenerate neutron cores". Astrophysical Journal. 346: 277. Bibcode:1989ApJ...346..277E. doi:10.1086/168008.
- Thorne, Kip S.; Flammang, Richard A.; Zytkow, Anna N. (February 1981). "Stationary spherical accretion into black holes. I - Equations of structure". Monthly Notices of the Royal Astronomical Society. 194 (2): 475–484. Bibcode:1981MNRAS.194..475T. doi:10.1093/mnras/194.2.475.
- Paczynski, Bohdan; Zytkow, Anna N. (1 June 1978). "Hydrogen shell flashes in a white dwarf with mass accretion". Astrophysical Journal. 222: 604. Bibcode:1978ApJ...222..604P. doi:10.1086/156176.
- Thorne, Kip S.; Zytkow, Anna N. (15 March 1977). "Stars with degenerate neutron cores. I - Structure of equilibrium models". Astrophysical Journal. 212: 832. Bibcode:1977ApJ...212..832T. doi:10.1086/155109.
- Thorne, Kip S.; Zytkow, Anna N. (1 July 1975). "Red giants and supergiants with degenerate neutron cores neutron cores. 1: Structure of equilibrium models". Astrophysical Journal. 199. Bibcode:1975ApJ...199L..19T. doi:10.1086/181839.
