= Mike Irwin =

British astronomer

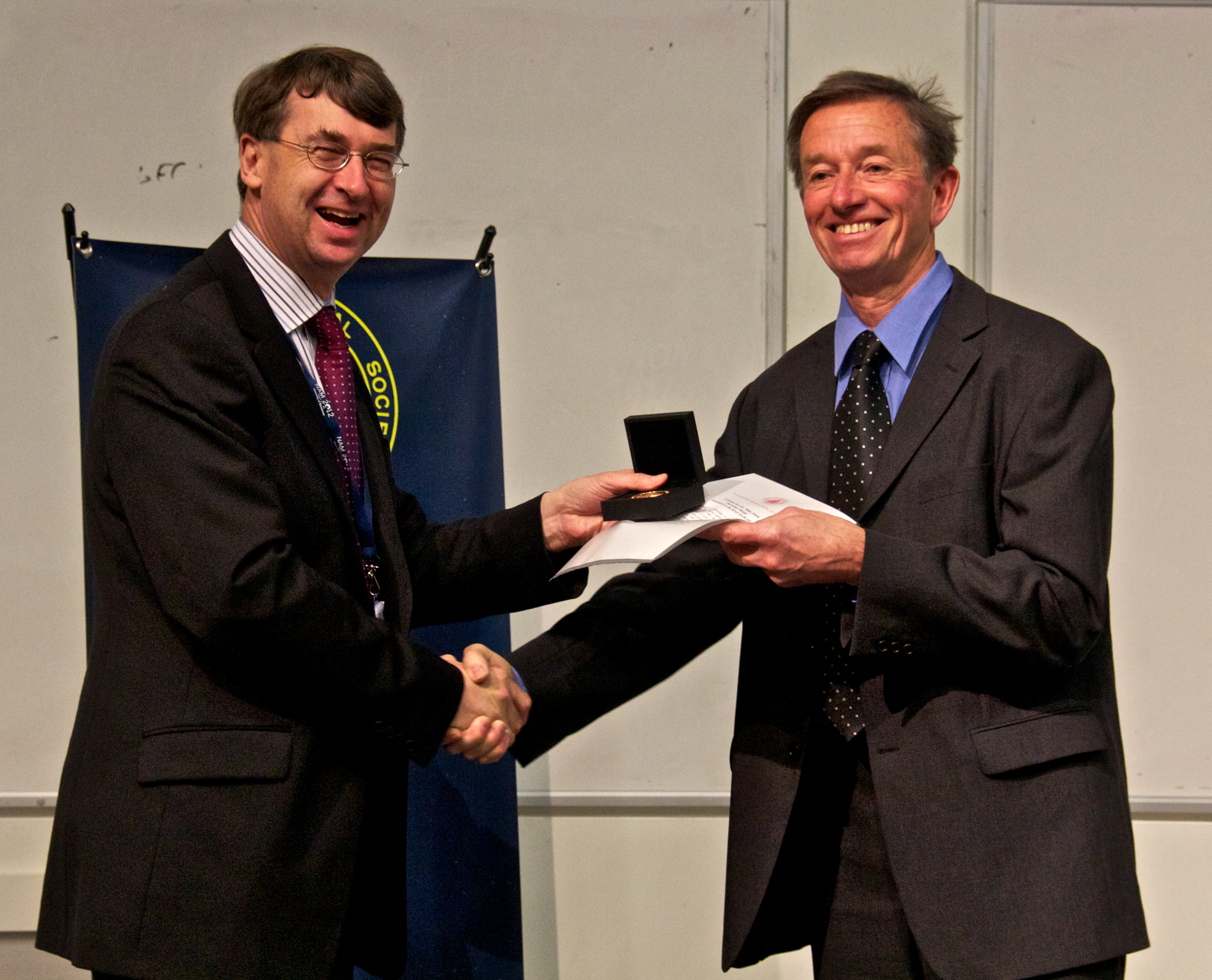
- Mike Irwin receiving the Herschel Medal from Roger Davies in 2012
- Born: Michael J. Irwin
- Known for: Discovery of the Sagittarius Dwarf Elliptical Galaxy
- Awards: Herschel Medal (2012)
- Scientific career
- Institutions: University of Cambridge
- Doctoral students: Céline Péroux
- Website: www.ast.cam.ac.uk/~mike/

Michael J. Irwin is a British astronomer. He is the director of the Cambridge Astronomical Survey Unit and one of the discoverers of the Cetus Dwarf galaxy and the Sagittarius Dwarf Elliptical Galaxy.

== Research ==
Irwin is known worldwide for the leading role he plays in processing of digital optical and infra-red survey data. Currently, his efforts in processing of digital optical and infrared survey data of Vista Data Flow are being used for processing United Kingdom Infrared Telescope data.

== Awards and honours ==
In 2012, Royal Astronomical Society awarded Michael Irwin the 2012 Herschel Medal, which recognises investigations of outstanding merit in observational astrophysics. He has also made contributions in the scientific community by writing and helping write several books.

== List of discovered minor planets ==
According to the Minor Planet Center's official discoverer list, Irwin co-discovered 8 minor planets during 1990–1996.

(8012) 1990 HO_{3}	29 April 1990	list^{[A]}
(8361) 1990 JN_{1}	1 May 1990	list^{[A]}
15810 Arawn	12 May 1994	list^{[A]}
(16684) 1994 JQ1	11 May 1994	list^{[A]}
(19299) 1996 SZ4	16 September 1996	list^{[B]}^{[C]}
(48443) 1990 HY_{5}	29 April 1990	list^{[A]}

(58165) 1990 HQ_{5}	29 April 1990	list^{[A]}
(73682) 1990 HU_{5}	29 April 1990	list^{[A]}
Co-discovery made with:^{A} A. Żytkow^{B} A. Fitzsimmons^{C} I. P. Williams
