= Thomas Bond Sprague =

British actuary

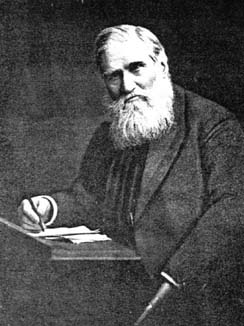
Thomas Bond Sprague

Thomas Bond Sprague FRSE FFA FIA LLD (29 March 1830 – 29 November 1920) was a British actuary, barrister and mathematician who was the only person to have been President of both the Institute of Actuaries (1882–1886) in London and the Faculty of Actuaries (1894–1896) in Edinburgh, prior to their merger in 2010.

== Life ==
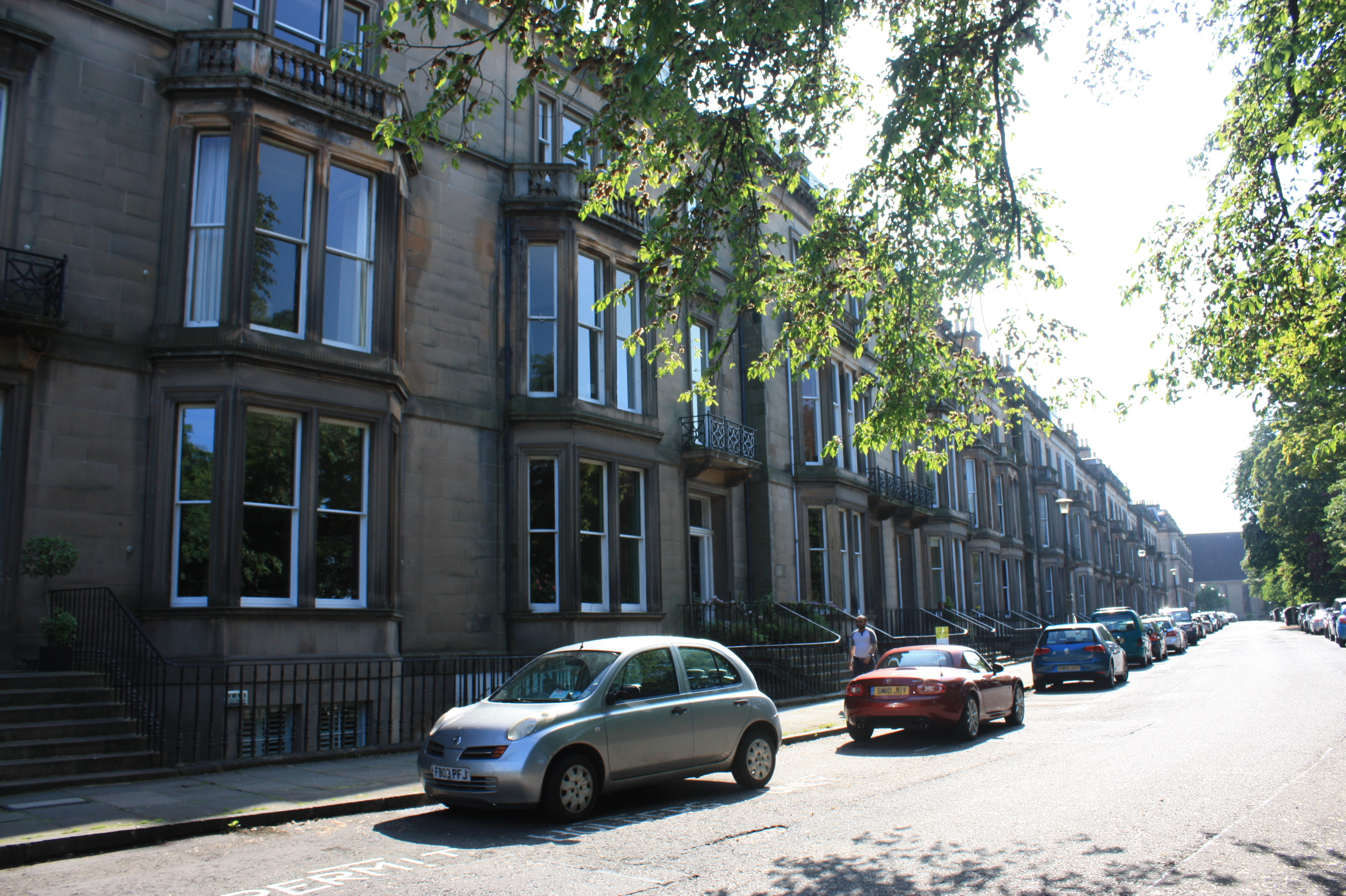
19 to 35 Buckingham Terrace, Edinburgh

Sprague was born in London the son of Thomas Sprague, a wholesale stationer. He attended Tarvin Hall School near Chester.

Sprague was an undergraduate at St John's College, Cambridge, where he was elected to a fellowship following his ranking as Senior Wrangler in the Cambridge Mathematical Tripos of 1853. He was awarded the Smith's Prize of Cambridge University in the same year. After serving as the actuary to the Equity and Law life insurance company (1861–1873), he became chief executive (1873–1900) of the Scottish Equitable Life Assurance Society in Edinburgh.

In 1874 he was elected a Fellow of the Royal Society of Edinburgh. His proposers were David Smith, Samuel Raleigh, Philip Kelland, and Peter Guthrie Tait.

He retired at age 70. He lived at 29 Buckingham Terrace in Edinburgh's West End.

He died on 29 November 1920 at West Holme in Woldingham in Surrey.

== Memorials ==
The Thomas Bond Sprague Prize was established in his honour in 2012 within Churchill College, Cambridge, and the Faculty of Mathematics, University of Cambridge.

== Family ==
He married twice: firstly in 1859 to Margaret Vaughn Steains; secondly in 1908 to Jean Elizabeth Stuart.
