= Anthony Shepherd =

British astronomer

Anthony Shepherd (c. 1721–1796) was a British astronomer. He was the Plumian Professor at the University of Cambridge between 1760 and 1796. He published astronomical tables, and was a friend of Captain Cook, who named the Shepherd Islands after him.

== Biography ==
He was born in Kendal, Westmorland, the elder son of Arthur Shepherd. Following his schooling at Kendal, he was admitted to St John's College, Cambridge on 27 June 1740, at the age of nineteen. He received a BA in 1744 and an MA from Christ's College in 1747; he became a BD in 1761, and a DD in 1766.

In 1777 he was appointed Canon of the seventh stall at St George's Chapel, Windsor Castle, a position he held until 1796.

He never married and died at his house in Dean Street, Soho, London, on 15 June 1796.

== Notable students ==
- William Paley
