= Suzanne Aigrain =

Astrophysicist

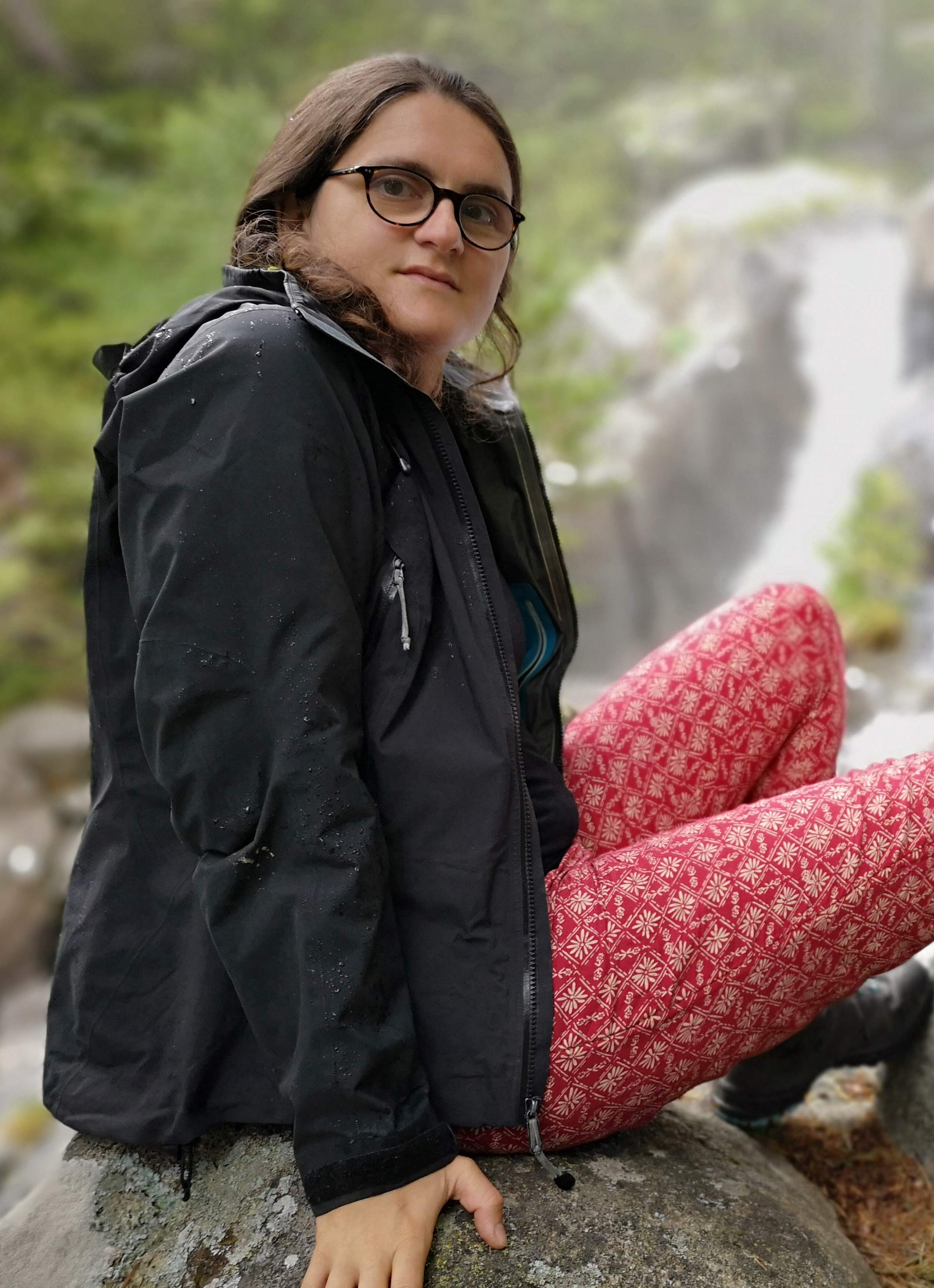
- Suzanne Aigrain in 2018
- Born: January 9, 1979 (age 47)
- Education: Lycée Pierre-de-Fermat; Imperial College London (BSc); University of Cambridge (PhD)
- Scientific career
- Fields: Astrophysics; Astronomy; Exoplanets; Bayesian inference
- Workplaces: University of Oxford; University of Exeter; University of Cambridge
- Thesis: Planetary transits and stellar variability (2005)
- Website: www.asc.ox.ac.uk/person/284

Suzanne Aigrain (born 1979) is a professor of astrophysics at the University of Oxford and a Fellow of All Souls College, Oxford. She studies exoplanets and stellar variability.

== Early life and education ==
Aigrain grew up in Toulouse, France, and was educated at the Lycée Pierre-de-Fermat. She studied physics at Imperial College London and graduated in 2000. During her undergraduate studies she was an intern at the Exploratorium in San Francisco. She spent sixth months at the European Space Agency before joining the Institute of Astronomy, Cambridge for her doctoral studies, earning a PhD in 2005 for work on planetary transits and stellar variability.

== Career and research ==
Aigrain was a postdoctoral research associate in the Institute of Astronomy from 2004. In 2007 Aigrain joined the University of Exeter as a lecturer. She was appointed a Fellow of All Souls College, Oxford in 2010. She leads the Stars & Planets group at Oxford Astrophysics, studying exoplanets and their stars. She uses the Hubble Space Telescope, the Very Large Telescope and CoRoT satellite. In 2011 she hosted a meeting with the Institute of Physics and Royal Astronomical Society to discuss recent discoveries in exoplanets, attended by Giovanna Tinetti and Jocelyn Bell Burnell.

She has expressed her concerns about the detection of planets using the radial velocity method to detect exoplanets; such as instrumental precision, stellar activity, patchy observations and limitations of other models. She was part of the European Southern Observatory (ESO) discovery of the Earth sized planet close to Alpha Centauri Bb, but played an even closer role in the study that disproved the planet's existence in 2016.

Aigrain and her group use Bayesian inference to correct for instrumental systematics while robustly preserving real astrophysical signals. She has played a leading role in the Kepler space telescope (K2) mission, correcting for its systematic noise and discovering many transiting planets. Aigrain has studied hot Jupiters and other Jupiter-like planets. She has looked at the potential to use transit surveys to study stellar clusters. Her research has been funded by the Science and Technology Facilities Council (STFC).

In 2019 Algrain was awarded a European Research Council Consolidator Grant to study exoplanets.

Aigrain is interested in public engagement and regularly delivers popular science lectures. She spoke about exoplanets on In Our Time in 2013., and has taken part in Pint of Science. In 2018 she spoke at the Oxford Playhouse, accompanying the play One Small Step. In November 2018 she was part of the Kings Place Bach, the Universe and Everything performance. She is a member of the International Astronomical Union. She writes non-fiction with Philippe Aigrain, as well as writing her own poetry.
