= Tyson Medal =

The Tyson Medal is a prize awarded for the best performance in subjects relating to astronomy at the University of Cambridge, England. It is awarded annually for achievement in the examinations for Part III of the Mathematical Tripos when there is a candidate deserving of the prize. In his will, Henry Tyson made the following bequest:

That the sum of three hundred pounds be paid to the Cambridge University the interest annually to be for a gold medal for the best proficient in Mathematics and Astronomy in the same way as Dr Smith's and to bear the donor's name.

The value of the fund was £65,095 in 2008.

== List of winners ==
Most of this list is from The Times newspaper archive. The winners of the prize are published in The Cambridge University Reporter.

- 1895 Archibald Young Gipps Campbell
- 1896 E. T. Whittaker
- 1904 Philip Edward Marrack
- 1905 F. J. M. Stratton
- 1911 Albert Henry Stewart Gillson
- 1912 John Jackson
- 1913 Hermann Glauert
- 1914 William Marshall Smart
- 1919 William Michael Herbert Greaves
- 1924 Alan Fletcher
- 1927 Charles Stewart McLeod
- 1928 J. C. P. Miller
- 1930 Vishnu Vasudev Narlikar and Andrew Wood Taylor
- 1931 W. E. Candler
- 1932 J. A. Edgar
- 1933 Raymond Lyttleton
- 1934 F. L. Westwater
- 1935 Robert Martineau
- 1936 G. L. Clark
- 1937 David Stanley Evans
- 1941 C. Plumpton
- 1954 P. J. Message
- 1956 J. H. Biltcliffe
- 1960 Jayant Vishnu Narlikar
- 1964 Michael Victor Penston
- 1966 J. Skilling
- 1967 Susan H. Storer
- 1968 Derek Jeffrey Raine
- 1969 Douglas C. Heggie
- 1970 Christopher Rodney Prior
- 1971 James E. Pringle
- 1972 Stephen Theodore Chesmer Siklos and Christopher Andrew Jones
- 1973 Andrew Richard Garlick and Roman L. Znajek
- 1974 Philip William Murray Brighton
- 1976 Christopher Neville Pope
- 1978 Robert Sinclair MacKay
- 1979 Ian G. Moss
- 1980 Susan Stepney
- 1981 Julian Christopher Luttrell
- 1982 Peter P. Taylor
- 1984 Michael John Thompson
- 1985 Koenraad H. Kuijken
- 1986 Mark G. Mitchard
- 1987 Helen F. Dowker
- 1988 Nigel Peake
- 1989 Robin J. R. Williams
- 1993 Christopher Stephen Reynolds
- 1994 Gordon Ian Ogilvie
- 1997 Jan B Gutowski
- 1999 Steven R. Furlanetto
- 2000 Robert D. Jones
- 2004 Joshua T. Horwood
- 2005 Alexander L.G. Scordellis
- 2006 João G. Rosa
- 2007 Simeon Bird
- 2008 Blake D. Sherwin
- 2010 Curt von Keyserlingk
- 2011 Adam Solomon
- 2012 Raghu Mahajan
- 2013 Benjamin Wallisch
- 2014 Michael J. Cole
- 2015 Felicity Eperon
- 2016 Theodor Björkmo
- 2017 Roland Bittleston and Philip Boyle-Smith
- 2018 Niklas J. F. Henke and Atul Sharma
- 2019 Philip De Friend and James Moore
- 2022 J. J. Brown, T.-Y. Leung and P. L. Röhl
- 2023 Jun Liu, T. A. S. Hillman and M. Smith
- 2024 William Boyce

== See also ==
- List of astronomy awards
- List of mathematics awards
