= Christopher Pope (physicist) =

British physicist

Christopher Neville Pope is the Distinguished Professor of Physics and Astronomy and the Stephen Hawking Chair of Fundamental Physics at Texas A&M University.

In 1976, Pope graduated with B.S. from Clare College, Cambridge and was awarded the Tyson Medal. From St John's College, Cambridge he received in 1979 his M.A. and in 1980 his Ph.D. His doctoral thesis Instantons in quantum gravity was written under the supervision of Stephen Hawking.
