= John Stewart of Rannoch Scholarship =

John Stewart of Rannoch Scholarships are scholarship awards made at the University of Cambridge in Hebrew, Latin and Greek and Sacred Music.

The awards were established by the will of John Stewart of Rannoch, who died on 19 July 1884. Where candidates are of equal merit, preference is given to natives of Wiltshire, Somerset or Gloucestershire.
