= Part III of the Mathematical Tripos =

Cambridge University master's course

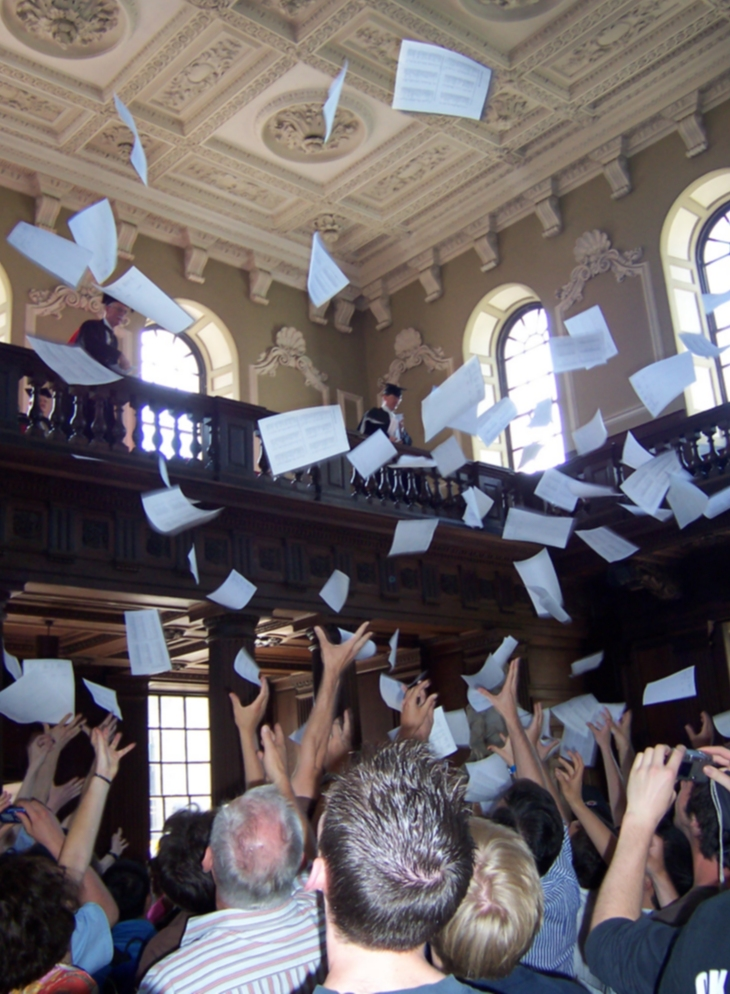
Results for parts II and III of the Mathematical Tripos are read out inside Senate House, University of Cambridge and then tossed from the balcony.

Part III of the Mathematical Tripos (officially Master of Mathematics/Master of Advanced Study) is a one-year master's-level taught course in mathematics offered at the Faculty of Mathematics, University of Cambridge. It is regarded as the most difficult and intensive mathematics course in the world. Roughly one third of the students take the course as a continuation at Cambridge after finishing the Parts IA, IB, and II of the Mathematical Tripos resulting in an integrated Master's (MMath), whilst the remaining two thirds are external students who take the course as a one-year Master's (MASt).

== History ==
The Smith's Prize Examination was founded by bequest of Robert Smith upon his death in 1768 to encourage the study of more advanced mathematics than that found in the undergraduate course. T. W. Körner notes

Only a small handful of students took the Smith's prize examination in the nineteenth century. When Karl Pearson took the examination in 1879, the examiners were Stokes, Maxwell, Cayley, and Todhunter and the examinees went on each occasion to the examiner's house, did a morning paper, had lunch there, and continued their work on the paper in the afternoon.

— Thomas William Körner

In 1883 this was replaced by an exam called Part III and the Smith's Prize awarded for an essay rather than examination. In 1886 this exam was renamed Part II, and later in 1909 Part II, Schedule B. In 1934 it was again renamed Part III.

In the 1980s the Certificate of Advanced Study in Mathematics was introduced; for those students successfully completing Part III of the Mathematical Tripos in Easter Term 2011 CASM was replaced by two new degrees, the Master of Mathematics (MMath) and Master of Advanced Study (MASt). All who have passed the course since 1962 are entitled to these new degrees. The first retrospective MMath and MASt degrees were conferred as part of a celebration of the university's 800th anniversary. The course is often still referred to as Part III.

== Academics ==
=== Course structure ===
The course lasts one year, divided into three eight-week terms. There is a wide variety of lectures on both pure and applied maths, mostly concentrated in the first two terms. The third term is primarily for examinations (and revision for said examinations) which, together with the option of writing a part III essay (introduced in the 1970s, a miniature thesis, often in the form of a literature review), determine one's final grade entirely. As of the 2024–2025 academic year, however, the part III essay is effectively mandatory for achieving a final mark of Distinction.

=== Degree awarded ===
Students who have completed their undergraduate degree at Cambridge will be awarded both a Bachelor of Arts (BA) degree and a Master of Mathematics (MMath) degree for four years of study, provided they have not previously graduated with a BA degree. This allows Cambridge graduates to remain eligible for government funding for the course. Progression from Part II of the Mathematical Tripos to Part III requires either a first class degree in Part II or very good performances in Parts IB and Part II. Students who complete Part III of the Mathematical Tripos, but did not complete undergraduate studies at Cambridge (or have previously graduated with a BA degree) are awarded the Master of Advanced Study (MASt) in Mathematics degree for the one-year course.

Until 2011, the programme resulted in a Certificate of Advanced Study in Mathematics instead of a master's degree.

=== Grading ===
The grades available are Fail, Pass (Honours), Merit, and Distinction (the Merit grade was introduced in 2000). Cambridge recognises that in Part III of the mathematical tripos a Merit is equivalent to a First Class in the other parts of the Tripos. The level of achievement required for a Distinction is yet higher than a typical First Class degree. Traditionally, results are announced in the university's Senate House. Standing on the balcony, the examiner reads out the class results for each student, and printed copies of the results are then thrown to the audience below. The students' exact rankings are no longer announced, but the highest-ranked student is still identified, nowadays by the tipping of the examiner's academic hat when the relevant name is read out.

=== Prizes ===
In addition to the grades, there are six associated prizes. Five of these may be awarded at the discretion of the examiners: the Mayhew Prize for applied mathematics, the Tyson Medal for mathematics and astronomy, the Bartlett Prize for applied probability, the Wishart Prize for statistics and the Pure Mathematics Prize for pure mathematics. Several notable astronomers and astrophysicists have been awarded the Tyson Medal in the history of Part III maths, including Jayant Narlikar, Ray Lyttleton and Edmund Whittaker. In addition, the Thomas Bond Sprague Prize is awarded by the Rollo Davidson Trust for distinguished performance in actuarial science, finance, insurance, mathematics of operational research, probability, risk and statistics.
