= Thomas Bond Sprague Prize =

Student award of British university

The Thomas Bond Sprague Prize is a prize awarded annually to the student or students showing the greatest distinction in actuarial science, finance, insurance, mathematics of operational research, probability, risk and statistics in the Master of Mathematics/Master of Advanced Studies examinations of the University of Cambridge, also known as Part III of the Mathematical Tripos. The prize is named after Thomas Bond Sprague, the only person to have been president of both the Institute of Actuaries in London and the Faculty of Actuaries in Edinburgh. It is awarded by the Rollo Davidson Trust of Churchill College, Cambridge, following a donation by D. O. Forfar, MA, FFA, FRSE (alumnus of Trinity College, Cambridge), former Appointed Actuary of Scottish Widows.

== List of recipients ==
- 2012 P. J. S. Lowth (Clare)
- 2013 P. Parmar (Trinity) and S. E. Penington (Clare)
- 2014 T. Assiotis (Trinity) and T. B. Berrett (Gonville and Caius)
- 2015 P. Gurican (Trinity) and A. Q. Wang (St John's)
- 2016 S. M. Olesker-Taylor (St John's) and I. Spasojevic (Trinity)
- 2017 O. Feng (Trinity) and D. Heydecker (Queens')
- 2018 B. B. He (Queens') and M. Lehmkuehler (Girton)
- 2019 V, Dvorak (Trinity)
- 2021 P. Bevan (Queens')
- 2022 E. Katiyar (Corpus Christi), S. McInerney (St John's) and D. Yue (Emmanuel)
- 2023 L. J. Hill (Trinity) and M. Augustynowicz (Trinity)
- 2024 L. Heeney-Brockett (Trinity Hall)
- 2025 K. Knight (Emmanuel) and I. Nath (Trinity)
- 2026 B. Gillott (Trinity) and E. MacGillivray (Trinity)

== See also ==
- List of mathematics awards
