= Sera Markoff =

American physicist (born 1971)

- Born: 6 July 1971 (age 55)
- Education: University of Arizona Massachusetts Institute of Technology
- Scientific career
- Fields: Astrophysics
- Workplaces: Anton Pannekoek Institute for Astronomy, University of Amsterdam, University of Cambridge
- Thesis: High Energy Processes in the Galactic Center (2000)
- Website: www.seramarkoff.com

Sera Brodie Markoff (born 6 July 1971) is an American astrophysicist and is the Plumian Professor of Astronomy and Experimental Philosophy at the University of Cambridge. She is a member of the Event Horizon Telescope team that produced the first image of a black hole.

== Education and career ==
Sera Markoff studied physics at the Massachusetts Institute of Technology and was awarded a Bachelor's of Science in Physics in 1993. In 1996 she gained a Master of Arts from the University of Arizona in theoretical astrophysics, and in 2000 she gained a PhD in the same field. She was an Alexander von Humboldt Foundation Research Fellow at the Max Planck Institute for Radio Astronomy in Bonn from 2000 to 2002 and a National Science Foundation Astronomy & Astrophysics Postdoctoral Fellow at the Massachusetts Institute of Technology from 2002 to 2005. In 2006 she joined the University of Amsterdam as an assistant professor, and was promoted to associate professor in 2008 and to professor in 2017. From 2015 she was a full professor of theoretical high energy astrophysics at the Anton Pannekoek Institute for Astronomy, University of Amsterdam, until her appointment as Plumian Professor of Astronomy and Experimental Philosophy at the University of Cambridge in December 2025.

In 2019 she became editor of the journal Astroparticle Physics.

== Research ==
Sera Markoff's research focuses on the interface between astrophysics and particle physics, in particular problems relating to processes occurring around dense objects such as black holes. She is a member of a number of large scale research projects including the Low-Frequency ARay (LOFAR), Cherenkov Telescope Array and Event Horizon Telescope, which produced the first image of a black hole. She is a member of the leadership of the Event Horizon Telescope project where she serves as a member of the science council and as one of the working group coordinators.

== Awards and honors ==
- Membership of the Royal Netherlands Academy of Arts and Sciences 2024
- Willem de Graaff Prize (Willem de Graaffprijs) for Public Outreach, the Royal Netherlands Astronomical Society 2019
- Beatrice M. Tinsley Centennial Visiting Professorship University of Texas at Austin 2015
- Fellow of the American Physical Society 2014
- VICI Award 2015
- VIDI Personal Career Award 2007

== Significant publications ==
- Markoff S et al. (2005). Going with the flow: can the base of jets subsume the role of compact accretion disk coronae? Astrophys. J. 635: 1203–1216
