= Tiziana Di Matteo (econophysicist) =

Professor of Econophysics

- Education: University of Salerno; Queen Mary University
- Scientific career
- Workplaces: King's College London

Tiziana Di Matteo is a Professor of Econophysics at King's College London. She studies complex systems, such as financial markets, and complex materials (such as superconductors). She serves on the council of the Complex Systems Society.

== Education and early career ==
Di Matteo graduated cum laude from the University of Salerno in 1994. She was an Erasmus student at Queen Mary University of London. She remained at the University of Salerno for her graduate studies, completing her PhD on Josephson junctions networks in 1999. After her PhD, she became interested in the data sets of real financial markets.

== Selected publications ==
- M. Tumminello; Di Matteo, Tiziana; R. N. Mantegna (2005). "A tool for filtering information in complex systems". Proceedings of the National Academy of Sciences of the United States of America. 102 (30): 10421–10426. arXiv:cond-mat/0501335. Bibcode:2005PNAS..10210421T. doi:10.1073/pnas.0500298102. PMC 1180754. PMID 16027373. Wikidata Q33906551.
- Di Matteo, Tiziana (2007). "Multi-scaling in finance". Quantitative Finance. 7 (1): 21–36. doi:10.1080/14697680600969727. Zbl 1278.91118. Wikidata Q105592847.
- Di Matteo, Tiziana; T. Aste; Dacorogna, Michel Marie (2003). "Scaling behaviors in differently developed markets". Physica A. 324 (1–2): 183–188. Bibcode:2003PhyA..324..183D. doi:10.1016/s0378-4371(02)01996-9. Zbl 1072.91565. Wikidata Q105576219.

== Awards and honours ==
Di Matteo was a QEII Fellow at the Australian National University. She joined the Department of Mathematics at King's College London in 2009. She has used the generalised Hurst approach to study the foreign exchange market and stock markets. In 2014 she was made a Professor of Econophysics at King's College London. Econophysics uses the statistical methods of physics to analyse financial markets.

She was appointed to the Council of the Complex Systems Society in 2018. Di Matteo is the editor-in-chief of the Journal of Network theory in Finance. She also serves as editor for the European Physical Journal B. She was elected to the Academia Europaea in 2024.
