= Tiziana Di Matteo (astrophysicist) =

Astrophysicist and cosmologist

Tiziana M. Di Matteo is an astrophysicist and cosmologist. Born in Italy and educated in Canada and England, she has worked in Germany and the US; she directs the McWilliams Center for Cosmology & Astrophysics at Carnegie Mellon University, where she is a professor of physics. Her research has involved the computer simulation of galaxy formation and evolution, galaxy mergers, the effects of these mergers on the growth of the supermassive black hole at the centers of galaxies, and the effects of these black holes on the growth of the galaxies that surround them.

== Education and career ==
Di Matteo is originally from Bologna, in Italy. After attending an international high school in Vancouver, Canada, she read astrophysics at University College London in England, graduating with first class honours in 1995. She then went to Trinity College, Cambridge for doctoral study in astrophysics, completing her Ph.D. in 1998. Her doctoral dissertation, Studies of hot plasmas and black-hole accretion, was supervised by Andrew Fabian.

She became a Chandra Postdoctoral Fellow at Harvard University from 1998 to 2001, and a researcher and professor at the Max Planck Institute for Astrophysics in Germany from 2001 to 2005. She moved to Carnegie Mellon University as an associate professor in 2005, and became a full professor there in 2014.

== Recognition ==
Di Matteo was elected as a Fellow of the American Physical Society in 2014, "for pioneering work in computational cosmology which has made fundamental contributions to our understanding of the impact and growth of black holes in structure formation."
