= CI Tauri =

Star in the constellation Taurus

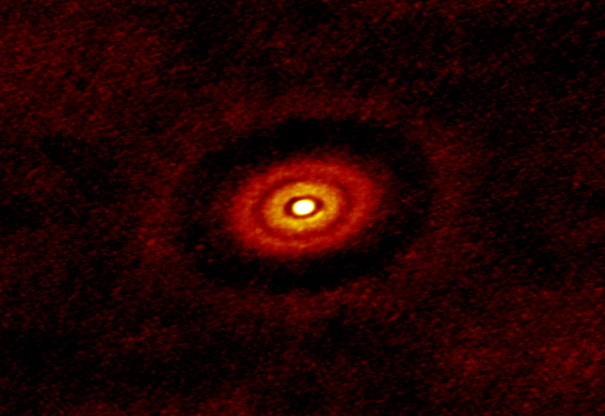
- Atacama Large Millimeter Array image of CI Tauri, showing three gaps in the disk

Observation data Epoch J2000 Equinox ICRS
- Constellation: Taurus
- Right ascension: 04^{h} 33^{m} 52.01440^{s}
- Declination: +22° 50′ 30.0941″
- Apparent magnitude (V): 13.8

Characteristics
- Evolutionary stage: T Tauri star
- Spectral type: K4IVe
- Variable type: Orion variable

Astrometry
Radial velocity (R_{v})	+16.2 km/s
Proper motion (μ)	RA: +8.942 mas/yr Dec.: –17.079 mas/yr
Parallax (π)	6.2376±0.0205 mas
Distance	523 ± 2 ly (160.3 ± 0.5 pc)

Details
Mass	0.90±0.02 M_{☉}
Radius	1.679 R_{☉}
Rotation	6.6 d or 9 d
Age	2-3 Myr

Other designations
- CI Tau, 2MASS J04335200+2250301, EPIC 247584113

Database references
SIMBAD	data

CI Tauri is a young star, about 2 million years old, located approximately 523 light-years (160 parsecs) away in the constellation Taurus. It is still accreting material from a debris disk at an unsteady pace, possibly modulated by the eccentric orbital motion of an inner planet. The spectral signatures of compounds of sulfur were detected from the disk.

The magnetic field on the surface of CI Tauri, equal to 0.22 T, is close to average for T Tauri stars.

== Planetary system ==
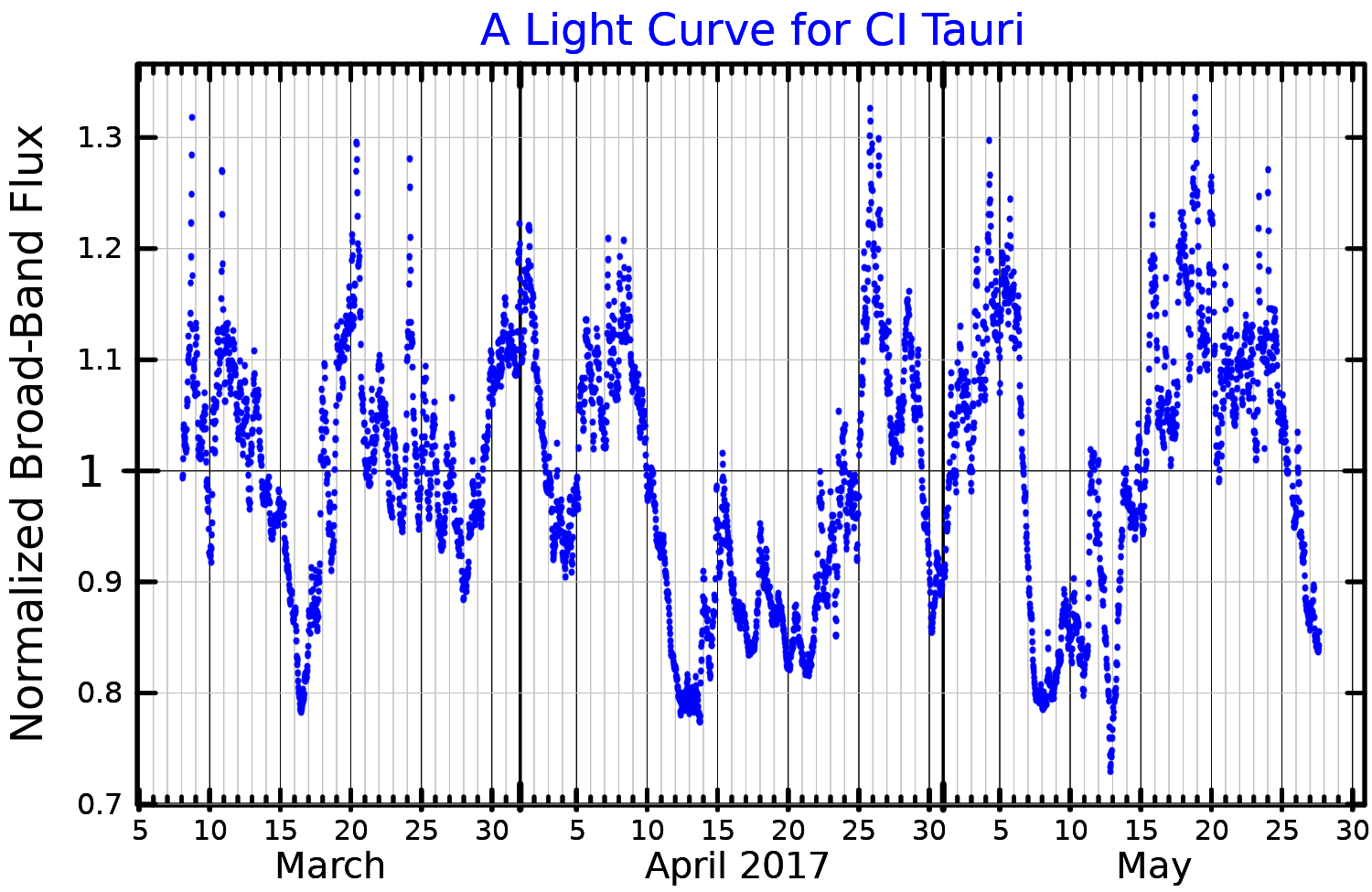
A broad-band optical light curve for CI Tauri, adapted from Roggero et al. (2021)

CI Tauri hosts a protoplanetary disk, and evidence for planets has been found via both radial velocity and disk morphology.

=== Radial velocity ===
CI Tauri displays several periodic radial velocity variations, including periods of 6.6 days, 9 days, and 25 days. The 9-day period was proposed to be due to a candidate massive planet on an eccentric orbit, CI Tauri b, in 2016. The discovery of CI Tauri b was notable because it is a hot Jupiter, which are supposed to take a minimum of 10 million years to form, and are often thought to be too close to their parent stars to have formed there.

The existence of this planet has been debated; in 2019, a detection of carbon monoxide attributed to the planet's atmosphere was announced, seemingly confirming it. However, a 2020 study found that the star rotates with a period of 9 days, and suggested that the radial velocity variations may be caused by the star's rotation rather than a planet. The carbon monoxide detection was attributed to magnetic interaction of the star with the circumstellar disk. Other studies have attributed the 6.6-day period to the stellar rotation and the 9-day period to the candidate planet.

A 2024 study found evidence for a planetary origin of the 25-day radial velocity signal, while considering the 9-day signal to correspond to the stellar rotation and be caused by a starspot. This 25-day candidate planet would orbit CI Tauri at a distance of 0.17 AU in a highly-eccentric orbit (e = 0.58). The mass of this planet is estimated to be 3.6±0.3 M_{J}. While this is treated as a strong candidate and left undesignated by its discovery paper, the NASA Exoplanet Archive lists it as a confirmed planet with the designation CI Tauri c. Another study in 2025 using additional observations detected the 25-day period only in the CO spectral lines, but not in atomic lines, which suggests that this periodicity is instead caused by a structure in the disk, or by a lower-mass planet orbiting at a distance of 0.16 astronomical units. The latter scenario is supported by other observations.

=== Disk morphology ===
In 2018 the possible detection of three more planets, inferred by gaps in the protoplanetary disk surrounding the star, was announced. Using the Atacama Large Millimeter Array (ALMA) to look for 'siblings' of CI Tauri b, a team of researchers detected three distinct gaps in the protoplanetary disk which their theoretical modelling suggests are caused by three other planets. The two outer planets are believed to be about the mass of Saturn, while the inner planet's mass is around the same as Jupiter. Two of the new planets are similarly located to those inferred in the HL Tauri protoplanetary disk.

Another 2018 study also found evidence for the outermost of these planets at around 100 AU, estimating a mass of 0.25-0.8 times that of Jupiter. If this discovery is confirmed this would be the most massive collection of exoplanets ever detected at this age with its four planets spanning a factor of a thousand in orbital radius.

The gaps are visible in wideband photography, but not in the gas spectral lines. These "gaps" may be lower-temperature shadows of dust in the inner disk cast on outer parts rather than true gaps carved by planets.

The CI Tauri planetary system
Companion (in order from star)	Mass	Semimajor axis (AU)	Orbital period (days)	Eccentricity	Inclination (°)	Radius
b (false positive)	11.6+2.9 −2.7 M_{J}	—	8.9891±0.0202	0.25±0.16	50.5+6.3 −8.5°	—
c (disputed)	3.6±0.3 M_{J}	0.17±0.08	25.2+1.7 −1.8	0.58+0.05 −0.06	—	—
(unconfirmed)	~0.75 M_{J}	~14	—	—	—	—
(unconfirmed)	~0.15 M_{J}	~43	—	—	—	—
(unconfirmed)	~0.4 M_{J}	~108	—	—	—	—
debris disk	200–600 AU				50.3°	—
