= Institute of Astronomy, Cambridge =

Astronomy department of the university of Cambridge

Coordinates: 52.2141°N 0.0934°E

Institute of Astronomy
- Established: 1972
- Director: Cathie Clarke and Mark Wyatt
- Faculty: School of Physical Sciences, University of Cambridge
- Staff: 177
- Address: Madingley Road
- Location: Cambridge, Cambridgeshire, United Kingdom
- Website: www.ast.cam.ac.uk

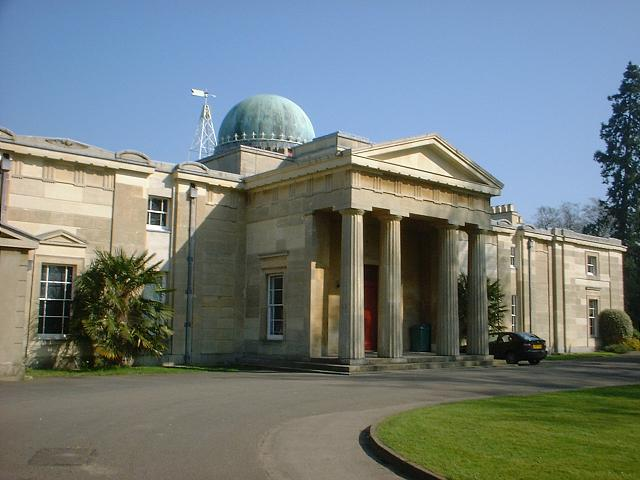
Institute of Astronomy Observatory Building, housing the library

The Institute of Astronomy (IoA) is the largest of the three astronomy departments in the University of Cambridge, and one of the largest astronomy sites in the United Kingdom. Around 180 academics, postdocs, visitors and assistant staff work at the department.

Research at the department is made in a number of scientific areas, including exoplanets, stars, star clusters, cosmology, gravitational-wave astronomy, the high-redshift universe, AGN, galaxies and galaxy clusters. This is a mixture of observational astronomy, over the entire electromagnetic spectrum, computational theoretical astronomy, and analytic theoretical research.

The Kavli Institute for Cosmology is also located on the department site. This institute has an emphasis on The Universe at High Redshifts. The Cavendish Astrophysics Group are based in the Battcock Centre, a building in the same grounds.

== History ==
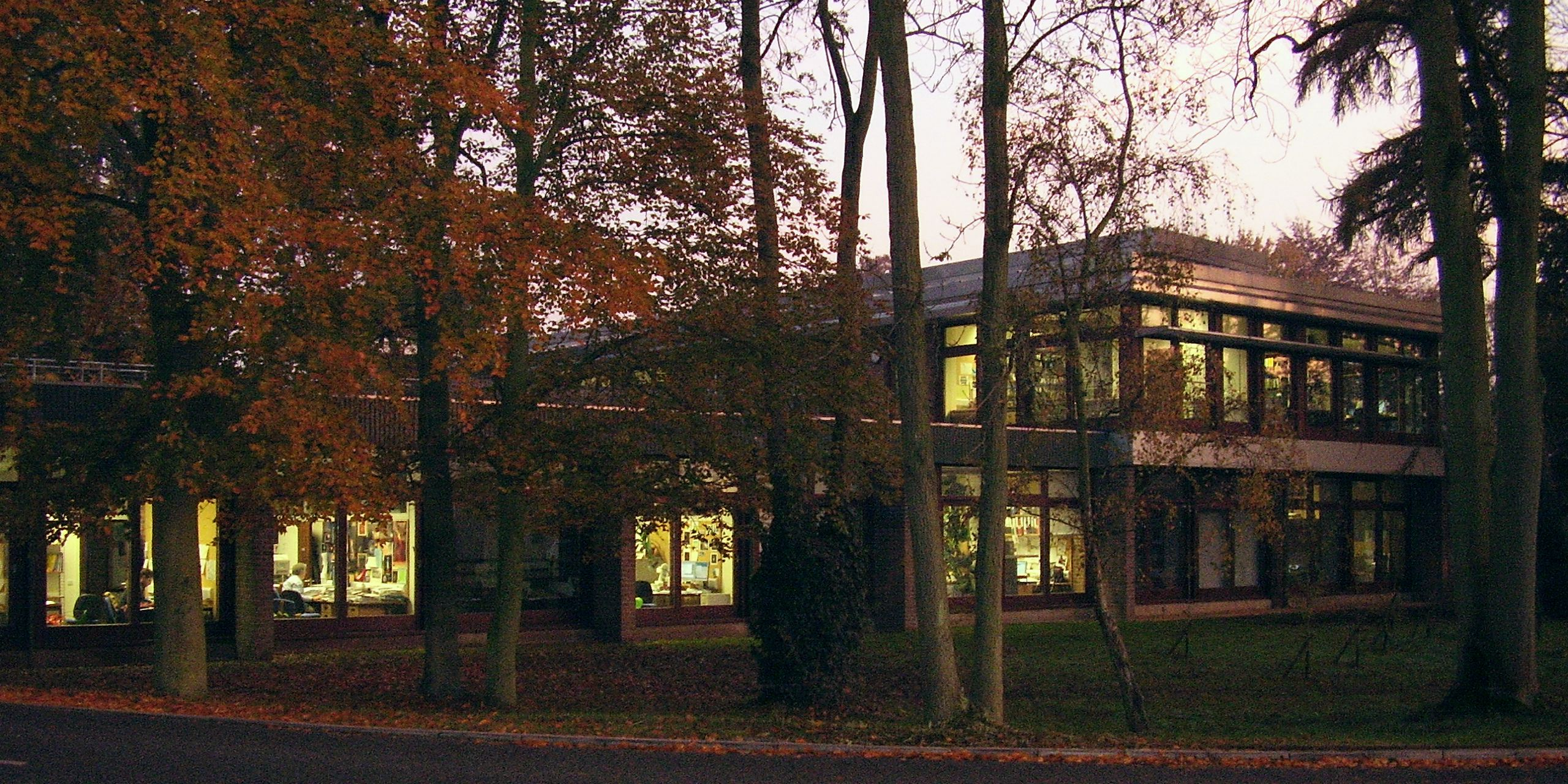
Institute of Astronomy Hoyle Building in the evening

The institute was formed in 1972 from the amalgamation of earlier institutions:

- The University Observatory, founded in 1823. Its Cambridge Observatory building now houses offices and the department library.
- The Solar Physics Observatory, which started in Cambridge in 1912. The building was partly demolished in 2008 to make way for the Kavli Institute for Cosmology.
- The Institute of Theoretical Astronomy, which was created by Fred Hoyle in 1967. Its building is the main departmental site (the Hoyle Building), with a lecture theatre added in 1999, and a second two-storey wing built in 2002.

From 1990 to 1998, the Royal Greenwich Observatory was based in Cambridge, where it occupied Greenwich House on a site adjacent to the Institute of Astronomy.

== Teaching ==
The department teaches about thirty 3rd and 4th year undergraduates as part of the Natural Sciences Tripos or Mathematical Tripos. Courses include General Relativity, Cosmology, Black Holes, Extrasolar Planets, Astrophysical Fluid Dynamics, Structure and Evolution of Stars & Formation of Galaxies, and students also complete a research project. In addition, there are around 12 to 18 graduate PhD students at the department each year, mainly funded by the STFC. The graduate programme is particularly unusual in the UK as the students are free to choose their own PhD supervisor or adviser from the staff at the department, and this choice is often made as late as the end of their first term.

== Notable current staff ==
An incomplete list of notable current members of the department.

- Cathie Clarke
- Carolin Crawford
- George Efstathiou
- Andrew Fabian
- Mike Irwin
- Gerry Gilmore
- Douglas Gough
- Nikku Madhusudhan
- Sera Markoff
- Richard McMahon
- Hiranya Peiris
- Max Pettini
- James E. Pringle
- Martin Rees
- Christopher Tout
- Anna Zytkow

== Notable past members and students ==
Here are some notable members of the department and its former institutes.

- Sverre Aarseth
- Suzanne Aigrain
- George Airy
- Robert Stawell Ball
- James Challis
- Donald Clayton
- John Couch Adams
- Arthur Eddington
- Richard Ellis
- Roger Griffin
- Stephen Hawking
- Cyril Hazard
- Fred Hoyle
- Ofer Lahav
- Mike Irwin
- Jamal Nazrul Islam
- Harold Jeffreys
- Robert Kennicutt
- Donald Lynden-Bell
- Jayant Narlikar
- Jeremiah Ostriker
- Christopher S. Reynolds
- Anne Walker
- Robert Woodhouse

== Telescopes ==
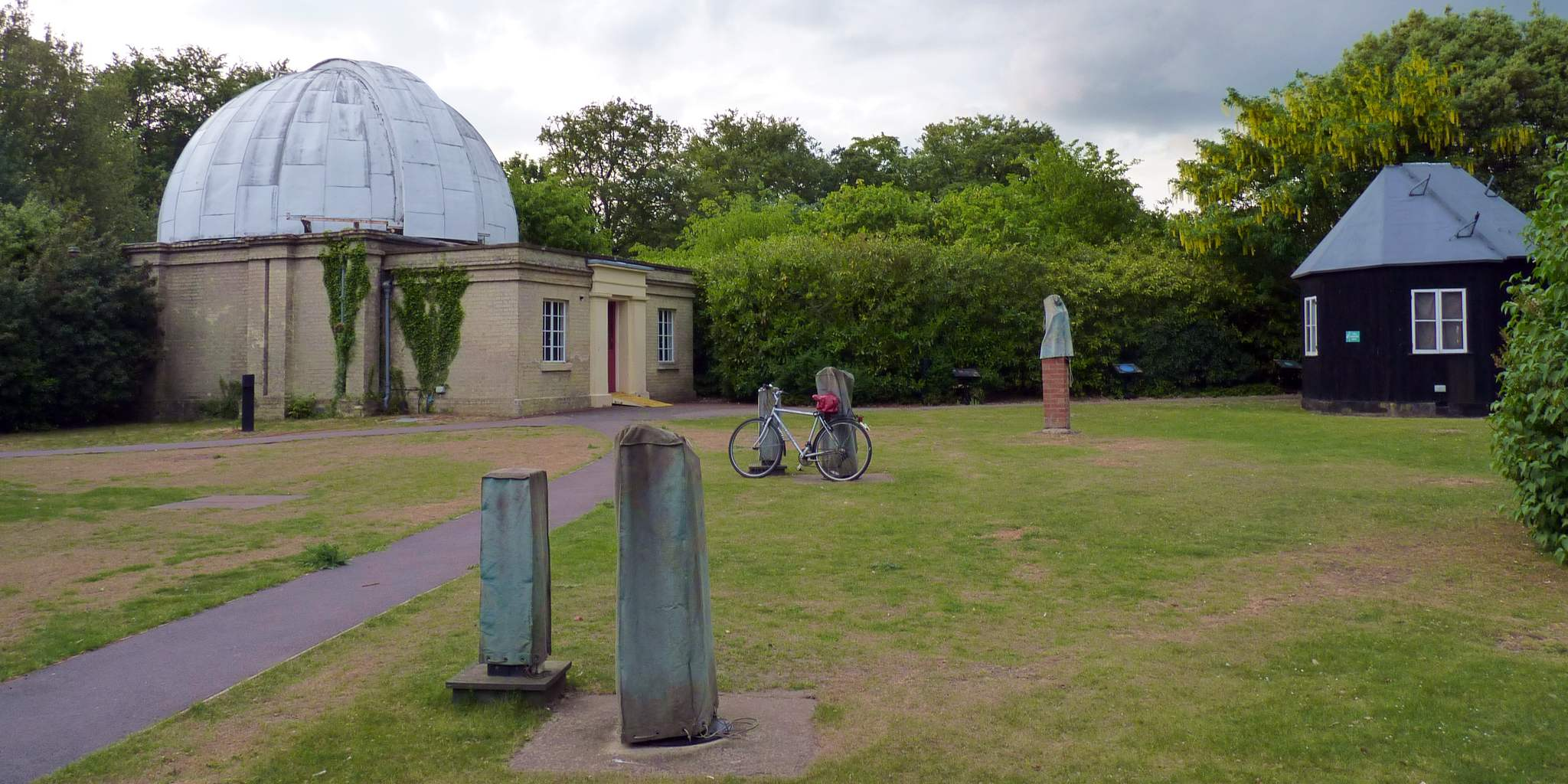
Observatory buildings containing the Northumberland Telescope (left) and Thorrowgood Telescope (right) at the Institute of Astronomy of the University of Cambridge. Covered structures in the foreground are mounts for portable telescopes.

The Institute houses several telescopes on its site. Although some scientific work is done with the telescopes, they are mostly used for public observing and astronomical societies. The poor weather and light-pollution in Cambridge makes most modern astronomy difficult. The telescopes on the site include:

- The Northumberland Telescope donated by the Duke of Northumberland in 1833. This is a 12-inch (300 mm) diameter refractor on an English mount.
- The smaller Thorrowgood Telescope, on extended loan from the Royal Astronomical Society. The telescope is an 8-inch (200 mm) refractor.
- The 36-inch Telescope, built in 1951.
- The Three-Mirror Telescope, which is a prototype telescope with a unique design to have wide field of view, sharp images and all-reflection optics.

The institute's former 24" Schmidt Camera was donated to the Spaceguard Centre in Knighton, Powys in Wales in June 2009.

The Cambridge University Astronomical Society (CUAS) and Cambridge Astronomical Association (CAA) both regularly observe. The Institute holds public observing evenings on Wednesdays from October to March.

== Public activities ==
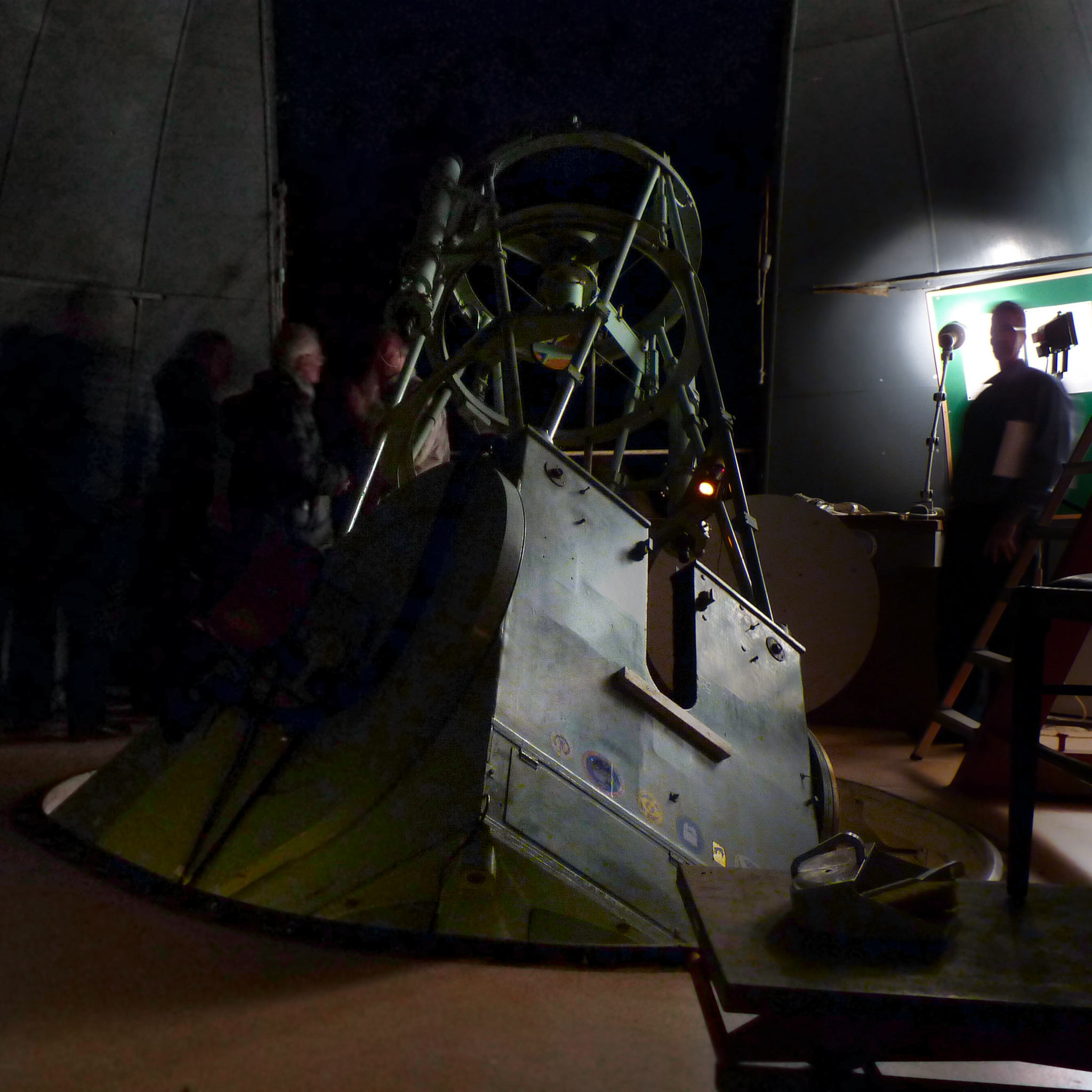
The 36-inch telescope being used for the 2011 Cambridge Astronomy Association Introduction to Astronomy course.

The department holds a number of events involving the general public in astronomy. These include or have included:

- Open evenings on Wednesdays during the winter, with a talk given by a member of the institute followed by observing in clear weather
- Hosting the Astroblast conference
- Annual sculpture exhibition showing work of Anglia Ruskin University
- Annual open day during the Cambridge Science Festival
- A monthly podcast, the 'Astropod', aimed at the general public (the Astropod originally ran from 2009 to 2011, and was relaunched in 2020)
- Extra observing nights for special events such as IYA Moonwatch and BBC stargazing live

== Library ==
The institute library is housed in the old Cambridge Observatory building. It is a specialist library concentrating on the subjects of astronomy, astrophysics and cosmology. The collection has approximately 17,000 books and subscribes to about 80 current journals. The library also has a collection of rare astronomical books, many of which belonged to John Couch Adams.

== Achievements ==
Among the significant contributions to astronomy made by the institute, the now decommissioned Automatic Plate Measuring (APM) machine was used to create a major catalogue of astronomical objects in the northern sky.

== Employment tribunal ==
In 2026, Neil Wyn Evans, professor of astrophysics, won an employment tribunal against Cambridge University. The tribunal found that he had been victimised after making complaints of bullying and misogyny at the institute.
