= Augustus De Morgan =

British mathematician and logician (1806–1871)

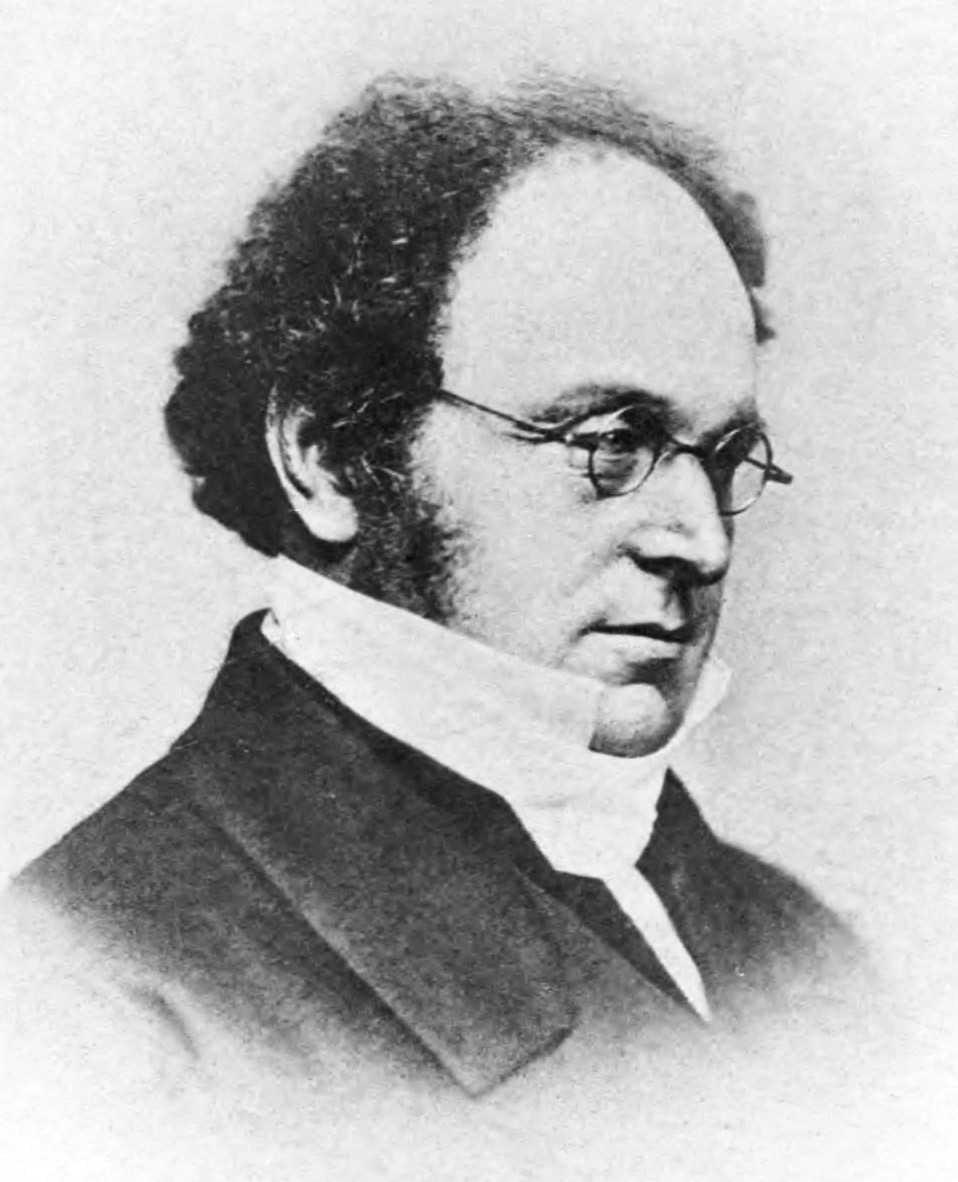
- De Morgan
- Born: 27 June 1806; Madurai, Carnatic, Madras Presidency (present-day India)
- Died: 18 March 1871 (aged 64); London, England
- Education: Trinity College, Cambridge
- Known for: De Morgan's laws De Morgan algebra De Morgan hierarchy Relation algebra Universal algebra
- Scientific career
- Fields: Mathematician and Logician
- Workplaces: University College London; University College School
- Academic advisors: John Philips Higman; George Peacock; William Whewell
- Notable students: Edward Routh; James Joseph Sylvester; Frederick Guthrie; William Stanley Jevons; Jacob Waley; Ada Lovelace; Walter Bagehot; Richard Holt Hutton; Francis Guthrie; Stephen Joseph Perry; Numa Edward Hartog; Isaac Todhunter; Henry Roscoe; Arthur Cohen; Thomas Hodgkin; Robert Bellamy Clifton; Charles James Hargreave; George Jessel; Sedley Taylor

Notes
- He was the father of William De Morgan.

Augustus De Morgan (27 June 1806 – 18 March 1871) was a British mathematician and logician. He is best known for De Morgan's laws relating logical conjunction, disjunction, and negation, and for coining the term "mathematical induction", the underlying principles of which he formalized. De Morgan's contributions to logic are heavily used in many branches of mathematics, including set theory and probability theory, as well as other related fields such as computer science.

== Biography ==
=== Childhood ===
Augustus De Morgan was born in Madurai, in the Carnatic region of India, in 1806. (Note: The year of his birth may be found by solving a conundrum proposed by De Morgan himself, "I was x years of age in the year x^{2} (He was 43 in 1849). The problem is indeterminate, but it is made strictly determinate by the century of its utterance and the limit to a man's life. Those born in 1722 (1764–42), 1892 (1936–44) and 1980 (2025–45) are similarly privileged.) His father was Lieutenant-Colonel John De Morgan (1772–1816), who held various appointments in the service of the East India Company, and his mother, Elizabeth (née Dodson, 1776–1856), was the granddaughter of James Dodson, who computed a table of anti-logarithms (inverse logarithms). Augustus De Morgan became blind in one eye within a few months of his birth. His family moved to England when Augustus was seven months old. As his father and grandfather had both been born in India, De Morgan used to say that he was neither English nor Scottish nor Irish, but a Briton "unattached," using the technical term applied to an undergraduate of Oxford or Cambridge who was not a member of any one of the colleges.

When De Morgan was ten years old, his father died. His mathematical talents went unnoticed until he was fourteen when a family friend discovered him making an elaborate drawing of a figure from one of Euclid's works with a ruler and compasses. He received his secondary education from Mr. Parsons, a fellow of Oriel College, Oxford, who preferred classics to mathematics.

=== Education ===
In 1823, at the age of sixteen, De Morgan enrolled in Trinity College, Cambridge, where his teachers and tutors included George Peacock, William Whewell, George Biddell Airy, H. Parr Hamilton, and John Philips Higman. Both Peacock and Whewell would influence De Morgan's selection of algebra and logic for further research.

De Morgan placed fourth in the Mathematical Tripos, earning a Bachelor of Arts degree. To obtain the higher degree of Master of Arts and become eligible for a fellowship, he was required to pass a theological test. Although he had been raised in the Church of England, De Morgan strongly objected to taking this test. Unable to advance in academia due to his refusal, he entered Lincoln's Inn to pursue a career in law.

=== Career ===
==== London University, 1827–1831 ====
The London University (now known as University College London) was founded in 1826 as a secular alternative to Oxford and Cambridge; Catholics, Jews, and dissenters could enter as students and hold positions. Prior to opening in 1828, the University advertised 24 vacancies for professorship, two in mathematics, to which De Morgan applied.

De Morgan was appointed Professor of Mathematics on 23 February 1828 at the age of twenty-one. The Council of the London University had failed to recruit Charles Babbage and John Herschel to the position. Ultimately the search committee, steered by founder Lord Brougham, Olinthus Gregory, and Henry Warburton, selected De Morgan from a field of at least 31 candidates including Dionysius Lardner, Peter Nicholson, John Radford Young, Henry Moseley, John Herapath, Thomas Hewitt Key, William Ritchie, and John Walker.

De Morgan's work during this period focused on mathematical instruction: His first publication was The Elements of Algebra (1828), a translation of a French textbook by Louis Bourdon, followed by Elements of Arithmetic (1830), a widely used and long-lived textbook, and The Study and Difficulties of Mathematics (1831), a discourse on mathematical education.

Following a series of squabbles between the faculty, including De Morgan, and the administration, in particular the Warden, Leonard Horner, a dispute arose over the handling of medical student protests calling for the removal of the Professor of Anatomy, Granville Sharp Pattison, on the grounds of incompetence. While De Morgan and others argued that students should have no influence in the matter, the University bowed to student pressure and dismissed Pattison. De Morgan resigned on 24 July 1831, followed by Professors George Long and Friedrich August Rosen.

==== The Society for the Diffusion of Useful Knowledge ====
In 1826 Lord Brougham, one of the founders of London University, founded the Society for the Diffusion of Useful Knowledge (SDUK) with the goal of promoting self-education and improving the moral character of the middle- and working- classes through cheap and accessible publications. De Morgan became involved with the SDUK in March 1827; his unpublished manuscript Elements of Statics for the society may have played a role in his appointment to London University. One of its most voluminous and effective writers, De Morgan published several books with SDUK: On the Study and Difficulties of Mathematics (1831), Elementary Illustrations of the Differential and Integral Calculus (1832), The Elements of Spherical Trigonometry (1834), Examples of the Processes of Arithmetic and Algebra (1835), An Explanation of the Gnomic projection of the sphere (1836), The Differential and Integral Calculus (1842), and The Globes Celestial and Terrestrial (1845), as well as over 700 articles in the Penny Cyclopedia and contributions to the Quarterly Journal of Education, the Gallery of Portraits, and the Companion to the British Almanac.

==== Private tutor ====
Following his first resignation from London University, De Morgan started his work as a private tutor. One of his early students was Jacob Waley. He would tutor Ada Lovelace from 1840 through 1842, primarily via correspondence.

==== Actuary ====
De Morgan's great-grandfather, grandfather, and father-in-law were all actuaries; not surprisingly, De Morgan also worked as a consulting actuary for various life assurance firms, including the Family Endowment Assurance Office, the Albert Life Assurance Office, and the Alliance Assurance Company. He published several articles on actuarial subjects as well as the book An Essay on Probabilities and Their Application to Life Contingencies and Insurance Offices. However his most notable work as an actuary is his promotion of the work of Benjamin Gompertz, whose "law of mortality" was both under-appreciated and plagiarized.

==== Royal Astronomical Society ====
De Morgan became involved with the Astronomical Society of London in 1828. He would be appointed honorary secretary in 1831, the year in which it received its Royal Charter and became the Royal Astronomical Society. He would continue as secretary for 18 years and remain actively involved in the Society for 30 years.

==== London University, 1836–1866 ====
In 1836, De Morgan's replacement as Professor of Mathematics, George J. P. White, drowned; De Morgan was convinced to return and reinstated. That same year the London University was renamed University College and, together with King's College, was made an affiliate of the newly created University of London.

De Morgan was a highly successful mathematics teacher. For over 30 years his courses covered a full curriculum, from Euclid through the calculus of variations, with his classes often exceeding 100 students. His approach integrated lectures, reading, problem sets, personal instruction, and extensive course notes. He disliked rote learning and viewed mathematics education as learning to reason and core to a liberal education. Several of his students went on to become mathematicians, most notably James Joseph Sylvester, and some of them, Edward Routh and Isaac Todhunter, well known educators themselves. Many of his non-mathematician students rated him highly; William Stanley Jevons described De Morgan as "unrivalled" as a teacher. Jevons, heavily influenced by De Morgan, would go on to do independent work in logic and become best known for the development of the theory of utility as part of the so-called Marginal Revolution.

In 1866, the Chair of Mental Philosophy and Logic at University College fell vacant and James Martineau was recommended formally by the Senate to the Council. The Council, at the urging of George Grote, rejected Martineau on the grounds that he was a Unitarian clergyman and instead appointed a layman, George Croom Robertson. De Morgan argued that the founding principle of religious neutrality had been abandoned and immediately resigned.

==== Abstract algebra and Sir William Rowan Hamilton ====
De Morgan was an early proponent of symbolical algebra. First expressed by George Peacock in his Treatise on Algebra (1830) and developed by Duncan Gregory, symbolical algebra was a first step towards abstract algebra, separating the manipulation of symbols from their arithmetic meaning. While symbolical algebra could mechanically construct negative and imaginary numbers, as in the work of Adrien-Quentin Buée, Jean-Robert Argand, and John Warren, it could not provide their interpretation; De Morgan observed that a similar problem troubled the classical Indian mathematician Bhāskara II in his work Bijaganita.

De Morgan would move on from symbolical algebra to develop what he called "logical" or "double" algebra in a series of papers and the book Trigonometry and Double Algebra (1849). De Morgan's double algebra was never fully developed but remains a precursor to geometric algebra and influenced the Irish mathematician Sir William Rowan Hamilton in his development of quaternions.

De Morgan and Hamilton were friends and correspondents for over 25 years, with De Morgan serving both as a colleague in mathematics, reviewing his Lectures on Quaternions (1853), and as a confidant on personal matters.

==== Mathematical logic and George Boole ====
The study of logic in Britain underwent a revival following the publication of Richard Whately's Elements of Logic in 1826. The book itself was the subject of a debate that would spur both De Morgan and George Boole to action. On the one hand, argued by William Whewell, logic, particularly syllogism as emphasized by Whately, could not arrive at "new truths" and was therefore inferior to and distinct from scientific reasoning; on the other hand, argued by the Scottish philosopher Sir William Hamilton, Whately's effort to equate logic to a "grammar for reasoning" was wrong and reductive. De Morgan, perhaps influenced by the writings of Sylvestre François Lacroix, saw the utility of Whately's logic in mathematics, both in its emphasis on the syllogism and in its grammar-like abstraction, as evidenced in his own writings on education and in his demand for the inclusion of logic in the Cambridge curriculum.

De Morgan's paper "On the structure of the syllogism", published in 1846, mathematically defines the rules of Aristotelian logic, specifically syllogism, and including what are now known as De Morgan's laws. Historically significant as the inception of mathematical logic, at the time, De Morgan's paper initiated a dispute with Hamilton over the role of mathematics in logic; "mathematics can not conduce to logical habits at all," Hamilton would write. The dispute would focus on the so-called quantification of the predicate, which Hamilton claimed, but as the dispute wore on in the pages of the Athenæum and in the publications of the two writers, it became apparent that Hamilton and his supporters were wrong and that De Morgan's mathematically precise description of Aristotle's logic was correct. On realizing this, Hamilton would claim that De Morgan had committed plagiarism. (Note: De Morgan would write to the other Hamilton Be it known unto you that I have discovered that you and the other Sir W. H. are reciprocal polars with respect to me (intellectually and morally, for the Scottish baronet is a polar bear, and you, I was going to say, are a polar gentleman). When I send a bit of investigation to Edinburgh, the W. H. of that ilk says I took it from him. When I send you one, you take it from me, generalize it at a glance, bestow it thus generalized upon society at large, and make me the second discoverer of a known theorem.)

Boole, a friend of De Morgan's since 1842, motivated in part by the disputes between Whewell and Hamilton and De Morgan and Hamilton, would write The Mathematical Analysis of Logic, published in 1847 on the same day as De Morgan's Formal Logic. Boole's work would eclipse De Morgan's and come to define early mathematical logic. De Morgan continued to support Boole's efforts, proofreading and advocating for Boole's work. Upon Boole's death, De Morgan worked to ensure Boole's family received a government pension.

==== The Ladies College in Bedford Square ====
Recruited by Elizabeth Jesser Reid, in 1849 De Morgan taught mathematics for one year at the newly founded Ladies College in Bedford Square.

==== Ramchundra and Indian mathematics ====
In 1850 De Morgan received a book from John Elliot Drinkwater Bethune, A Treatise on Problems of Maxima and Minima, written and self-published by the self-taught Indian mathematician Ramchundra. De Morgan was so struck by the work that he entered into correspondence with Ramchundra and arranged for the book's re-publication in London in 1859, targeting a European audience; De Morgan's preface surveyed classical Indian mathematical thought and urged a contemporary return of Indian mathematics:

On examining this work I saw in it, not merely merit worthy of encouragement, but merit of a peculiar kind, the encouragement of which, as it appeared to me, was likely to promote native effort towards the restoration of the native mind in India.

The influence of classical Indian logic on De Morgan's own work on logic has been speculated upon. Mary Boole, claimed a profound influence—via her uncle George Everest—of Indian thought in general and Indian logic, in particular, on her husband George Boole, as well as on De Morgan:

Think what must have been the effect of the intense Hinduizing of three such men as Babbage, De Morgan, and George Boole on the mathematical atmosphere of 1830–65. What share had it in generating the vector analysis and the mathematics by which investigations in physical science are now conducted?

==== London Mathematical Society ====
Arthur Cowper Ranyard and George Campbell De Morgan, De Morgan's son, conceived the idea of founding a mathematical society in London, where mathematical papers would be not only received (as by the Royal Society) but also read and discussed. The first meeting of the London Mathematical Society was held at University College in 1865. De Morgan was the first president and his son was the first secretary. The earliest members included Benjamin Gompertz, De Morgan's personal friend and fellow actuary, William Stanley Jevons and James Joseph Sylvester, De Morgan's former students, Thomas Archer Hirst, De Morgan's colleague, and mathematicians William Kingdom Clifford and Arthur Cayley.

=== Personal life ===
==== Family ====
Augustus was one of seven children, only four of whom survived to adulthood. These siblings were Eliza (1801–1836), who married Lewis Hensley, a surgeon living in Bath; George (1808–1890), a barrister-at-law who married Josephine, daughter of Vice Admiral Josiah Coghill, 3rd Baronet Coghill; and Campbell Greig (1811–1876), a surgeon at the Middlesex Hospital.

When De Morgan moved to London, he befriended William Frend (1757–1841). Both had studied mathematics at Cambridge and subsequently left for religious reasons, and both were actuaries. In the autumn of 1837, De Morgan married Sophia Elizabeth Frend (1809–1892), the eldest daughter of William Frend and Sarah Blackburne (1779–?), a granddaughter of Francis Blackburne (1705–1787), Archdeacon of Cleveland.

De Morgan had three sons and four daughters, including fairytale author Mary De Morgan. His eldest son was the potter William De Morgan, who would marry the painter Evelyn De Morgan, nee Pickering. His second son, George, acquired distinction in mathematics at University College and the University of London.

==== Personality ====
De Morgan was full of personal peculiarities. On the occasion of the installation of his friend, Lord Brougham, as Rector of the University of Edinburgh, the Senate offered to confer on him the honorary degree of LL. D.; he declined the honor as a misnomer. He humorously described himself using the Latin phrase 'Homo paucarum literarum' (man of few letters), reflecting his modesty about his extensive contributions to mathematics and logic.

He disliked the provinces outside London, and while his family enjoyed the seaside and men of science were having a good time at a meeting of the British Association in the country, he remained in the hot and dusty libraries of the metropolis. He said that he felt like Socrates, who declared that the farther he was from Athens, the farther he was from happiness.

He never sought to become a Fellow of the Royal Society and he never attended a meeting of the Society. He said that he had no ideas or sympathies in common with the physical philosopher; his attitude was possibly due to his physical infirmity, which prevented him from being either an observer or an experimenter.

He never voted at an election, and he never visited the House of Commons, the Tower of London, or Westminster Abbey.

==== Religious views ====
Despite a strict Church of England upbringing De Morgan was publicly a non-conformist, at some personal cost: His refusal to conform debarred him from further advancement at Cambridge; his marriage was without Church ceremony; and on several occasions he fought with the University College administration to maintain religious neutrality, eventually resigning over the issue. In private De Morgan was a dissenter: He married into a Unitarian family, where his essentially Christian deist interpretations of scripture were welcome. Later in life he would lean more deist and join Martineau's Free Christian Union.

De Morgan was on occasion accused of atheism which he dismissed as sectarianism. (Note: "So you called me an atheist vagabond, fancying that Voltaire was an atheist: he was, in fact, theistic to bigotry, and anti-revolutionist to the same extent.") In his will De Morgan would write

I commend my future with hope and confidence to Almighty God; to God the Father of our Lord Jesus Christ, whom I believe in my heart to be the Son of God, but whom I have not confessed with my lips, because in my time such confession has always been the way up in the world.

=== Retirement and death ===
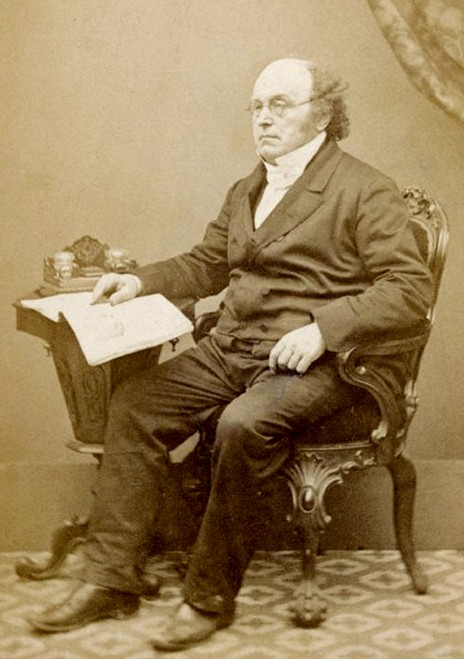
Augustus De Morgan

At age 60, De Morgan's pupils secured him a pension of £500 p.a., but misfortunes followed. Two years later, his son George—the "younger Bernoulli," as Augustus loved to hear him called, in allusion to the eminent father-and-son mathematicians of that name—died. This blow was followed by the death of a daughter. Five years after his resignation from University College, De Morgan died of nervous prostration on 18 March 1871.

== Mathematics ==
De Morgan is best known for his pioneering contributions to mathematical logic, specifically algebraic logic, and, to a lesser extent, for his contributions to the beginnings of abstract algebra.

=== Mathematical logic ===
De Morgan's contributions to logic are two-fold. Firstly, before De Morgan there was no mathematical logic—logic, including formal logic, was the domain of philosophers; De Morgan was the first to make formal logic a mathematical subject. Secondly, De Morgan would develop the calculus of relations, essentially abstracting logic via the application of algebraic principles.

De Morgan's first original paper on logic, "On the structure of the syllogism", appeared in the Transactions of the Cambridge Philosophical Society in 1846. The paper describes a mathematical system that formalizes Aristotelian logic, specifically the syllogism. While the rules De Morgan defines, including the eponymous De Morgan's laws, are straightforward, the formalism is significant: it represented the first serious instance of mathematical logic, which would come to pervade the field of logic, and presaged logic programming. The subsequent dispute with the philosopher Sir William Stirling Hamilton over the "quantification of the predicate" referred to in De Morgan's paper would lead George Boole to write the pamphlet Mathematical Analysis of Logic (1847). De Morgan elaborated upon his initial paper in the book Formal Logic, or the Calculus of Inference, Necessary and Probable (1847), published the same week as Boole's pamphlet and was immediately overshadowed by it. Nonetheless, later practitioners would recognize the pioneering nature of his work; C. I. Lewis wrote, "His originality in the invention of new logical forms, his ready wit, his pat illustrations, and clarity and liveliness of his writing did yeoman service in breaking down the prejudice against the introduction of 'mathematical' methods into logic".

De Morgan developed the calculus of relations in his paper "On the syllogism, No. IV" and in his book Syllabus of a Proposed System of Logic (1860). He showed that reasoning with syllogisms could be replaced with the composition of relations. The calculus was described as the logic of relatives by Charles Sanders Peirce, who admired De Morgan and met him shortly before his death. Historians trace several developments in modern logic directly to De Morgan's contributions to algebraic logic: "Any serious attempt to study the contemporary work of Tarski or Birkhoff should begin with a serious study of the most significant founders of their field, especially Boole, De Morgan, Pierce and Schröder". In fact, a theorem articulated by De Morgan in 1860 was later expressed by Schrŏder in his textbook on binary relations, and is now commonly called Schröder rules.

=== Abstract algebra ===
De Morgan was an early convert and supporter of Peacock's symbolical algebra but soon grew disillusioned. Starting in 1839, De Morgan authored a series of papers "On the foundation of algebra", describing what he called "logical" or "double" algebra, essentially an early form of geometric algebra. While these papers are perhaps most notable for their influence on Sir William Rowan Hamilton and the development of quaternions, they are also recognized to contain De Morgan's steps towards a fully abstract algebra:

"Inventing a distinct system of unit-symbols, and investigating or assigning relations which define their mode of action on each other".

De Morgan summarized and extended his algebraic work in his book Trigonometry and Double Algebra (1849).

== Works ==
De Morgan was a prolific writer; an incomplete list of his works occupies 15 pages of his memoirs. While most of his mathematical writing is educational in nature, consisting of various textbooks, it is for his pioneering contributions to logic for which he is best known, presented in several books and papers, notably Formal Logic (1847) and Syllabus of a Proposed System of Logic (1860). His work on algebra is also of note, in particular Trigonometry and Double Algebra (1849).

De Morgan was also a well known popularizer of science and mathematics; he contributed over 600 articles to the Penny Cyclopedia, ranging from Abacus to Young, Thomas. His most unusual work is A Budget of Paradoxes, a compilation of his writing, mostly book reviews, for The Athenæum Journal.

=== Algebra ===
While De Morgan's two early works on algebra are instructional, his translation of Bourdon's The Elements of Algebra (1828) and his own textbook The Elements of Algebra (1835), the issues he encountered while writing them would spur his later research.

De Morgan's research papers on algebra, presented in a sequence of four in the Transactions of the Cambridge Philosophical Society from 1839 to 1844 titled "On the foundation of algebra", defined what De Morgan called "logical" or "double" algebra. While the papers are most notable for their influence on Hamilton and quaternions, No. II includes the definition of what are now called fields and No. IV handles the case of "triple" algebra which eluded Hamilton.

De Morgan's book Trigonometry and Double Algebra (1849) consists of a treatise on trigonometry and a synthesis of his earlier work on algebra, tracing the development of "double" algebra, essentially geometric algebra, from arithmetic through symbolical algebra, illustrated throughout with the construction of the complex numbers. De Morgan enumerates the laws that define an algebraic structure, in an early instance of what Whitehead would call universal algebra. While De Morgan notably omits Gregory's associative law, the selective application of laws, e.g., commutativity, is what led to Hamilton's quaternions. Also of note is the introduction of hyperbolic functions and comparison of circular and hyperbolic trigonometry.

=== Logic ===
De Morgan's first work on logic, First Notions of Logic (1839), is pedagogical, introducing students to the necessary logic to study Euclid's Elements.

De Morgan's first research paper on logic, "On the structure of the syllogism" (1846), describing a mathematical system for Aristotelian syllogism, arguably marks the beginning of so-called mathematical logic. (Note: Note that Leibniz's writings on the calculus ratiocinator predate De Morgan by a century but remained unpublished until 1901. A similar but ultimately unsuccessful effort to define a mathematical system of logic by Johann Heinrich Lambert, Georg Jonathan von Holland, and Gottfried Ploucquet remained unpublished correspondences.)

Perhaps De Morgan's best known work, Formal Logic, or the Calculus of Inference, Necessary and Probable was published in 1847 in the same week (by arrangement) as George Boole's Mathematical Analysis of Logic. The book is primarily a reissue of his paper "On the structure of the syllogism" (1846) but also includes his earlier book, First Notions of Logic (1839), chapters on fallacies and probability, and the details of his dispute with the Scottish philosopher Sir William Hamilton.

De Morgan continued his research on logic in a series of papers, most notably "On the syllogism, No. IV" (1860), which introduced the logic of relations. De Morgan synthesizes much of this work in his book Syllabus of a Proposed System of Logic (1860).

=== A Budget of Paradoxes ===
Published posthumously in 1872, A Budget of Paradoxes is a compilation of De Morgan's column of the same name for the Athenæum, consisting mostly book reviews and focusing on so-called paradoxers, also referred to as pseudomaths (a De Morgan neologism) and pseudoscientists.

The pseudomaths De Morgan describes are mostly circle-squarers, such as Thomas Baxter, cube-duplicators, and angle-trisectors. One such angle-trisector was James Sabben, whose work received a one-line review from De Morgan:

"The consequence of years of intense thought": very likely, and very sad.

Another pseudomath identified by De Morgan was James Smith, a successful merchant of Liverpool, who claimed that $\pi = 3 \tfrac{1}{8}$. De Morgan writes:

Mr. Smith continues to write me long letters, to which he hints that I am to answer. In his last of 31 closely written sides of note paper, he informs me, with reference to my obstinate silence, that though I think myself and am thought by others to be a mathematical Goliath, I have resolved to play the mathematical snail, and keep within my shell... But he ventures to tell me that pebbles from the sling of simple truth and common sense will ultimately crack my shell...

Among the many pseudoscientific ideas De Morgan discredits are Alfred Wilks Drayson's expanding Earth theory and Samuel Rowbotham's Zetetic Astronomy, or the flat Earth theory.

In his discussion of calculations of $\pi$, De Morgan discusses at length Buffon's approximation and his own results using the method.

De Morgan gives space to non-technical subjects in Budget as well, religion in particular. De Morgan gives a favorable review of Godfrey Higgins' Anacalypsis and provides several anecdotes about the views of great mathematicians on religion, notably Laplace and Euler.

De Morgan frequently displays humor in Budget, including various anagrams such as, "Great Gun, do us a sum!" (="Augustus De Morgan"), The Astronomer's Drinking Song, and the poem Siphonaptera. Budget was well-received but hard to categorize. (Note: "This work is absolutely unique. Nothing in the slightest degree approaching it in its wonderful combinations has ever, to our knowledge, been produced. True and false science, theological, logical, metaphysical, physical, mathematical, etc., are interwoven in its pages in the most fantastic manner.")

== Spiritualism ==
Later in his life, De Morgan developed an interest in spiritualism. Initially intrigued by clairvoyance, he conducted paranormal investigations with the American medium Maria Hayden. The results of these investigations are documented in the book From Matter to Spirit: The Result of Ten Years Experience in Spirit Manifestations (1863), written by Sophia De Morgan and published anonymously to avoid repercussions.

Sophia was likely a convinced spiritualist, but De Morgan himself was neither a firm believer nor a skeptic. He maintained that the methodology of the physical sciences does not automatically exclude psychic phenomena, suggesting that such phenomena might eventually be explained by natural forces not yet identified by physicists. In the preface to From Matter to Spirit (1863), De Morgan writes:

Thinking it very likely that the universe may contain a few agencies – say half a million – about which no man knows anything, I can not but suspect that a small proportion of these agencies – say five thousand – may be severally competent to the production of all the [spiritualist] phenomena, or may be quite up to the task among them. The physical explanations which I have seen are easy, but miserably insufficient: the spiritualist hypothesis is sufficient, but ponderously difficult. Time and thought will decide, the second asking the first for more results of trial.

De Morgan was one of the first notable scientists in Britain to take an interest in the study of spiritualism, influencing William Crookes to also study spiritualism.

== Legacy ==
The headquarters of the London Mathematical Society are called De Morgan House, and the top prize awarded by the Society is the De Morgan Medal.

The student society of the Mathematics Department of University College London is called the Augustus De Morgan Society.

The lunar crater De Morgan is named after him.

== Collections ==
De Morgan's extensive library of mathematical and scientific works, many historical, was acquired by Samuel Jones-Loyd for the University of London and is now part of the Senate House Libraries collection.

=== University College London ===
- The London Mathematical Society's archive (up until 1994) is held in University College London (UCL) Special Collections. The collection primarily contains letters to Thomas Archer Hirst, but also includes correspondence to other European mathematicians.
- UCL holds around 150 rare books from the Society which focus on the history of mathematics and were published between 1701 - 1850.
- UCL holds letters from James Smith to Hepworth Dixon, editor of The Athenaeum, arguing against De Morgan's theory on the quadrature of the circle.
- UCL holds letters from De Morgan to F Hendriks written between 1852 - 1866.

== Publications ==
=== Books ===
- Bourdon, Pierre Louis Marie (1828). The Elements of Algebra. Translated by De Morgan, Augustus. London: John Taylor.
- De Morgan, Augustus (1831). On the Study and Difficulties of Mathematics.
- An Explanation of the Gnomonic Projection of the Sphere. London: Baldwin. 1836.
- Elements of Trigonometry, and Trigonometrical Analysis. London: Taylor & Walton. 1837a.
- Elements of Algebra. London: Taylor & Walton. 1837b.
- An Essay on Probabilities, and Their Application to Life Contingencies and Insurance Offices. London: Longman, Orme, Brown, Green & Longmans. 1838.
- De Morgan, Augustus (1839). First Notions of Logic, Preparatory to the Study of Geometry. London: Taylor & Walton.
- The Elements of Arithmetic (4th ed.). London: Taylor & Walton. 1840a.
- The Differential and Integral Calculus. London: Baldwin. 1842.
- The Globes, Celestial and Terrestrial. London: Malby & Co. 1845.
- De Morgan, Augustus (1847). Formal Logic or The Calculus of Inference, Necessary and Probable. London: Taylor & Walton.
- Trigonometry and Double Algebra. London: Taylor, Walton & Malbery. 1849.
- De Morgan, Augustus (1860). Syllabus of a Proposed System of Logic. London: Walton & Malbery.
- De Morgan, Augustus (1872). A Budget of Paradoxes. London: Longmans, Green.

=== Journal articles ===
- De Morgan, Augustus (1839). "On the Foundation of Algebra". Transactions of the Cambridge Philosophical Society. 7: 173–187.
- De Morgan, Augustus (1841). "On the Foundation of Algebra, No. II". Transactions of the Cambridge Philosophical Society. 7: 287–300.
- De Morgan, Augustus (1846). "On the structure of the syllogism, and on the application of the theory of probabilities to questions of argument and authority". Transactions of the Cambridge Philosophical Society. 8 XXIX: 379–408.
- De Morgan, Augustus (1843). "On the Foundation of Algebra, No. III". Transactions of the Cambridge Philosophical Society. 8: 139–142.
- De Morgan, Augustus (1844). "On the Foundation of Algebra, No. IV, On triple algebra". Transactions of the Cambridge Philosophical Society. 8: 241–253.
- De Morgan, Augustus (1850). "On the Symbols of Logic, the Theory of the Syllogism, and in particular of the Copula, and the application of the Theory of Probabilities to some questions of evidence". Transactions of the Cambridge Philosophical Society. 9: 79–127.
- De Morgan, Augustus (1858). "On the syllogism, No. III, and on logic in general". Transactions of the Cambridge Philosophical Society. 10 (1): 173–230.
- De Morgan, Augustus (1860). "On the syllogism, No. IV, and on the logic of relations". Transactions of the Cambridge Philosophical Society. 10 (2): 331–358.
- De Morgan, Augustus (1863). "On the syllogism, No. V, and on various points of the onymatic system". Transactions of the Cambridge Philosophical Society. 10 (2): 428–487.

== See also ==
- History of Grandi's series
- Murphy's law
- Squaring the circle
- Four color theorem
