= William Selwyn =

William Selwyn may refer to:

- William Selwyn (British Army officer) (c.1658–1702), MP and governor of Jamaica
- William Selwyn (MP for Whitchurch) (1732–1817), English barrister and member of parliament
- William Selwyn (barrister) (1775–1855)
- William Selwyn (astronomer) (1806–1875)
- William Selwyn (bishop) (1879–1951), Anglican suffragan bishop
