= History of Grandi's series =

== Geometry and infinite zeros ==
=== Grandi ===
Guido Grandi (1671–1742) reportedly provided a simplistic account of the series in 1703. He noticed that inserting parentheses into 1 − 1 + 1 − 1 + · · · produced varying results: either

$$(1-1) + (1-1) + \cdots = 0$$

or

$$1+(-1+1)+(-1+1) +\cdots = 1.$$

Grandi's explanation of this phenomenon became well known for its religious overtones:

By putting parentheses into the expression 1 − 1 + 1 − 1 + · · · in different ways, I can, if I want, obtain 0 or 1. But then the idea of the creation ex nihilo is perfectly plausible.

In fact, the series was not an idle subject for Grandi, and he didn't think it summed to either 0 or 1. Rather, like many mathematicians to follow, he thought the true value of the series was ^{1}/_{2} for a variety of reasons.

(1, ^{1}/_{2}) on the witch of Agnesi

Grandi's mathematical treatment of 1 − 1 + 1 − 1 + · · · occurs in his 1703 book Quadratura circula et hyperbolae per infinitas hyperbolas geometrice exhibita. Broadly interpreting Grandi's work, he derived 1 − 1 + 1 − 1 + · · · = ^{1}/_{2} through geometric reasoning connected with his investigation of the witch of Agnesi. Eighteenth-century mathematicians immediately translated and summarized his argument in analytical terms: for a generating circle with diameter a, the equation of the witch y = a^{3}/(a^{2} + x^{2}) has the series expansion

$$\sum_{n=0}^\infty \frac{(-1)^nx^{2n}}{a^{2n-1}}=a - \frac{x^2}{a\vphantom{a^3}} + \frac{x^4}{a^3} - \frac{x^6}{a^5} + \cdots$$

and setting a = x = 1, one has 1 − 1 + 1 − 1 + · · · = ^{1}/_{2}.

- According to Morris Kline, Grandi started with the binomial expansion

$$\frac{1}{1+x} = 1 - x + x^2 - x^3 + \cdots$$

and substituted x = 1 to get 1 − 1 + 1 − 1 + · · · = ^{1}/_{2}. Grandi "also argued that since the sum was both 0 and ^{1}/_{2}, he had proved that the world could be created out of nothing."

Grandi offered a new explanation that 1 − 1 + 1 − 1 + · · · = ^{1}/_{2} in 1710, both in the second edition of the Quadratura circula and in a new work, De Infinitis infinitorum, et infinite parvorum ordinibus disquisitio geometrica. Two brothers inherit a priceless gem from their father, whose will forbids them to sell it, so they agree that it will reside in each other's museums on alternating years. If this agreement lasts for all eternity between the brother's descendants, then the two families will each have half possession of the gem, even though it changes hands infinitely often. This argument was later criticized by Leibniz.

The parable of the gem is the first of two additions to the discussion of the corollary that Grandi added to the second edition. The second repeats the link between the series and the creation of the universe by God:

Sed inquies: aggregatum ex infinitis differentiis infinitarum ipsi DV æqualium, sive continuè, sive alternè sumptarum, est demum summa ex infinitis nullitatibus, seu 0, quomodo ergo quantitatem notabilem aggreget? At repono, eam Infiniti vim agnoscendam, ut etiam quod per se nullum est multiplicando, in aliquid commutet, sicuti finitam magnitudiné dividendo, in nullam degenerare cogit: unde per infinitam Dei Creatoris potentiam omnia ex nihlo facta, omniaque in nihilum redigi posse: neque adeò absurdum esse, quantitatem aliquam, ut ita dicam, creari per infinitam vel multiplicationem, vel additionem ipsius nihili, aut quodvis quantum infinita divisione, aut subductione in nihilum redigit.

=== Marchetti ===
After Grandi published the second edition of the Quadratura, his fellow countryman Alessandro Marchetti became one of his first critics. One historian charges that Marchetti was motivated more by jealousy than any other reason. Marchetti found the claim that an infinite number of zeros could add up to a finite quantity absurd, and he inferred from Grandi's treatment the danger posed by theological reasoning. The two mathematicians began attacking each other in a series of open letters; their debate was ended only by Marchetti's death in 1714.

== Leibniz ==
With the help and encouragement of Antonio Magliabechi, Grandi sent a copy of the 1703 Quadratura to Leibniz, along with a letter expressing compliments and admiration for the master's work. Leibniz received and read this first edition in 1705, and he called it an unoriginal and less-advanced "attempt" at his calculus. Grandi's treatment of 1 − 1 + 1 − 1 + · · · would not catch Leibniz's attention until 1711, near the end of his life, when Christian Wolff sent him a letter on Marchetti's behalf describing the problem and asking for Leibniz's opinion.

=== Background ===
As early as 1674, in a minor, lesser-known writing De Triangulo Harmonico on the harmonic triangle, Leibniz mentioned 1 − 1 + 1 − 1 + · · · very briefly in an example:

$\frac{1}{1+1} = \frac11-\frac{1}{1+1}. \;\mathrm{Ergo}\; \frac{1}{1+1} = 1-1+1-1+1-1 \;\mathrm{etc.}$

Presumably he arrived at this series by repeated substitution:

$$\frac{1}{1+1} = 1 - ( 1 - \frac{1}{1+1} )$$
$$\frac{1}{1+1} = 1 - ( 1 - ( 1 - ( 1 - \frac{1}{1+1} ) ) )$$
$$\frac{1}{1+1} = 1 - ( 1 - ( 1 - ( 1 - ( 1 - ( 1 - \frac{1}{1+1} ) ) ) ) )$$
And so on.

The series 1 − 1 + 1 − 1 + · · · also appears indirectly in a discussion with Tschirnhaus in 1676.

Leibniz had already considered the divergent alternating series 1 − 2 + 4 − 8 + 16 − · · · as early as 1673. In that case he argued that by subtracting either on the left or on the right, one could produce either positive or negative infinity, and therefore both answers are wrong and the whole should be finite. Two years after that, Leibniz formulated the first convergence test in the history of mathematics, the alternating series test, in which he implicitly applied the modern definition of convergence.

=== Solutions ===
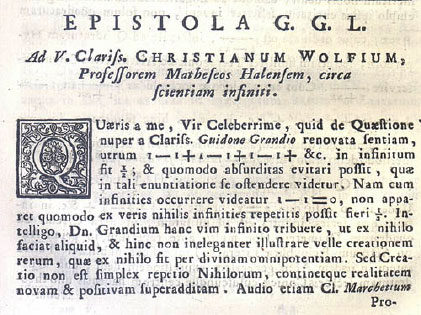
Beginning of the published Leibniz-Wolff letter

In the 1710s, Leibniz described Grandi's series in his correspondence with several other mathematicians. The letter with the most lasting impact was his first reply to Wolff, which he published in the Acta Eruditorum. In this letter, Leibniz attacked the problem from several angles.

In general, Leibniz believed that the algorithms of calculus were a form of "blind reasoning" that ultimately had to be founded upon geometrical interpretations. Therefore, he agreed with Grandi that 1 − 1 + 1 − 1 + · · · = ^{1}/_{2}, claiming that the relation was well-founded because there existed a geometric demonstration.

On the other hand, Leibniz sharply criticized Grandi's example of the shared gem, claiming that the series 1 − 1 + 1 − 1 + · · · has no relation to the story. He pointed out that for any finite, even number of years, the brothers have equal possession, yet the sum of the corresponding terms of the series is zero.

Leibniz thought that the argument from 1/(1 + x) was valid; he took it as an example of his law of continuity. Since the relation 1 − x + x^{2} − x^{3} + · · · = 1/(1 + x) holds for all x less than 1, it should hold for x equal to 1 as well. Still, Leibniz thought that one should be able to find the sum of the series 1 − 1 + 1 − 1 + · · · directly, without needing to refer back to the expression 1/(1 + x) from which it came. This approach may seem obvious by modern standards, but it is a significant step from the point of view of the history of summing divergent series. In the 18th century, the study of series was dominated by power series, and summing a numerical series by expressing it as f(1) of some function's power series was thought to be the most natural strategy.

Leibniz begins by observing that taking an even number of terms from the series, the last term is −1 and the sum is 0:

1 − 1 = 1 − 1 + 1 − 1 = 1 − 1 + 1 − 1 + 1 − 1 = 0.

Taking an odd number of terms, the last term is +1 and the sum is 1:

1 = 1 − 1 + 1 = 1 − 1 + 1 − 1 + 1 = 1.

Now, the infinite series 1 − 1 + 1 − 1 + · · · has neither an even nor an odd number of terms, so it produces neither 0 nor 1; by taking the series out to infinity, it becomes something between those two options. There is no more reason why the series should take one value than the other, so the theory of "probability" and the "law of justice" dictate that one should take the arithmetic mean of 0 and 1, which is (0 + 1) / 2 = 1/2.

Eli Maor says of this solution, "Such a brazen, careless reasoning indeed seems incredible to us today…" Kline portrays Leibniz as more self-conscious: "Leibniz conceded that his argument was more metaphysical than mathematical, but said that there is more metaphysical truth in mathematics than is generally recognized."

Charles Moore muses that Leibniz would hardly have had such confidence in his metaphysical strategy if it did not give the same result (namely ^{1}/_{2}) as other approaches. Mathematically, this was no accident: Leibniz's treatment would be partially justified when the compatibility of averaging techniques and power series was finally proven in 1880.

=== Reactions ===
When he had first raised the question of Grandi's series to Leibniz, Wolff was inclined toward skepticism along with Marchetti. Upon reading Leibniz's reply in mid-1712, Wolff was so pleased with the solution that he sought to extend the arithmetic mean method to more divergent series such as 1 − 2 + 4 − 8 + 16 − · · ·. Leibniz's intuition prevented him from straining his solution this far, and he wrote back that Wolff's idea was interesting but invalid for several reasons. For one, the terms of a summable series should decrease to zero; even 1 − 1 + 1 − 1 + · · · could be expressed as a limit of such series.

Leibniz described Grandi's series along with the general problem of convergence and divergence in letters to Nicolaus I Bernoulli in 1712 and early 1713. J. Dutka suggests that this correspondence, along with Nicolaus I Bernoulli's interest in probability, motivated him to formulate the St. Petersburg paradox, another situation involving a divergent series, in September 1713.

According to Pierre-Simon Laplace in his Essai Philosophique sur les Probabilités, Grandi's series was connected with Leibniz seeing "an image of the Creation in his binary arithmetic", and thus Leibniz wrote a letter to Jesuit missionary Claudio Filippo Grimaldi, court mathematician in China, in the hope that Claudio Filippo Grimaldi's interest in science and the mathematical "emblem of creation" might combine to convert the nation to Christianity. Laplace remarks, "I record this anecdote only to show how far the prejudices of infancy may mislead the greatest men."

== Divergence ==
=== Jacob Bernoulli ===
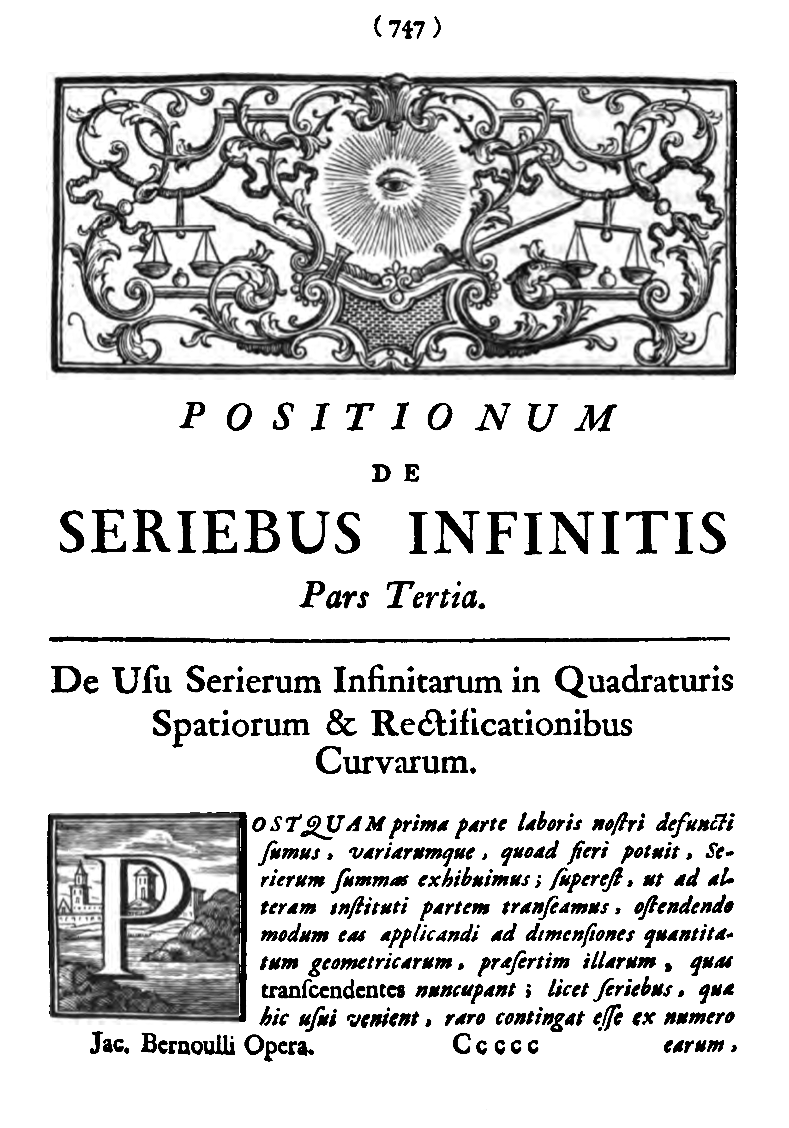
Start of Positiones part 3, as reprinted in 1744

Jacob Bernoulli (1654–1705) dealt with a similar series in 1696 in the third part of his Positiones arithmeticae de seriebus infinitis. Applying Nicholas Mercator's method for polynomial long division to the ratio k/(m + n), he noticed that one always had a remainder. If m > n then this remainder decreases and "finally is less than any given quantity", and one has

$$\frac{k}{m+n\vphantom{m^2}}=\frac{k}{m\vphantom{m^2}} - \frac{kn}{m^2} + \frac{kn^2}{m^3} - \frac{kn^3}{m^4} + \cdots.$$

If m = n, then this equation becomes

$$\frac{k}{2m\vphantom{m^2}}=\frac{k}{m\vphantom{m^2}} - \frac{k}{m\vphantom{m^2}} + \frac{k}{m\vphantom{m^2}} - \frac{k}{m\vphantom{m^2}} + \cdots.$$

Bernoulli called this equation a "not inelegant paradox".

=== Varignon ===
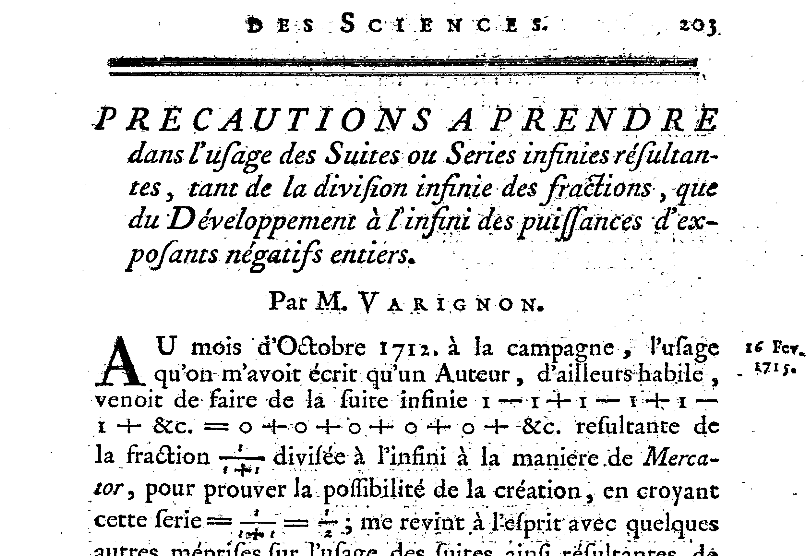

Pierre Varignon (1654–1722) treated Grandi's series in his report Précautions à prendre dans l'usage des Suites ou Series infinies résultantes…. The first of his purposes for this paper was to point out the divergence of Grandi's series and expand on Jacob Bernoulli's 1696 treatment.

(Varignon's math…)

The final version of Varignon's paper is dated February 16, 1715, and it appeared in a volume of the Mémories of the French Academy of Sciences that was itself not published until 1718. For such a relatively late treatment of Grandi's series, it is surprising that Varignon's report does not even mention Leibniz's earlier work. But most of the Précautions was written in October 1712, while Varignon was away from Paris. The Abbé Poignard's 1704 book on magic squares, Traité des Quarrés sublimes, had become a popular subject around the Academy, and the second revised and expanded edition weighed in at 336 pages. To make the time to read the Traité, Varignon had to escape to the countryside for nearly two months, where he wrote on the topic of Grandi's series in relative isolation. Upon returning to Paris and checking in at the Academy, Varignon soon discovered that the great Leibniz had ruled in favor of Grandi. Having been separated from his sources, Varignon still had to revise his paper by looking up and including the citation to Jacob Bernoulli. Rather than also take Leibniz's work into account, Varignon explains in a postscript to his report that the citation was the only revision he had made in Paris, and that if other research on the topic arose, his thoughts on it would have to wait for a future report.

(Letters between Varignon and Leibniz…)

In the 1751 Encyclopédie, Jean le Rond d'Alembert echoes the view that Grandi's reasoning based on division had been refuted by Varignon in 1715. (Actually, d'Alembert attributes the problem to "Guido Ubaldus", an error that is still occasionally propagated today.)

=== Riccati and Bougainville ===
In a 1715 letter to Jacopo Riccati, Leibniz mentioned the question of Grandi's series and advertised his own solution in the Acta Eruditorum. Later, Riccati would criticize Grandi's argument in his 1754 Saggio intorno al sistema dell'universo, saying that it causes contradictions. He argues that one could just as well write n − n + n − n + · · · = n/(1 + 1), but that this series has "the same quantity of zeroes" as Grandi's series. These zeroes lack any evanescent character of n, as Riccati points out that the equality 1 − 1 = n − n is guaranteed by 1 + n = n + 1. He concludes that the fundamental mistake is in using a divergent series to begin with:

In fact, it doesn't happen that if we stop this series, the following terms can be neglected in comparison with preceding terms; this property is verified only for convergent series."

Another 1754 publication also criticized Grandi's series on the basis of its collapse to 0. Louis Antoine de Bougainville briefly treats the series in his acclaimed 1754 textbook Traité du calcul intégral. He explains that a series is "true" if its sum is equal to the expression from which is expanded; otherwise it is "false". Thus Grandi's series is false because 1/(1 + 1) = 1/2 and yet (1 − 1) + (1 − 1) + · · · = 0.

== Euler ==
Leonhard Euler treats 1 − 1 + 1 − 1 + · · · along with other divergent series in his De seriebus divergentibus, a 1746 paper that was read to the Academy in 1754 and published in 1760. He identifies the series as being first considered by Leibniz, and he reviews Leibniz's 1713 argument based on the series 1 − a + a^{2} − a^{3} + a^{4} − a^{5} + · · ·, calling it "fairly sound reasoning", and he also mentions the even/odd median argument. Euler writes that the usual objection to the use of 1/(1 + a) is that it does not equal 1 − a + a^{2} − a^{3} + a^{4} − a^{5} + · · · unless a is less than 1; otherwise all one can say is that

$$\frac{1}{1+a} = 1 - a + a^2 - a^3 + \cdots \pm a^n \mp \frac{a^{n+1}}{1+a},$$

where the last remainder term does not vanish and cannot be disregarded as n is taken to infinity. Still writing in the third person, Euler mentions a possible rebuttal to the objection: essentially, since an infinite series has no last term, there is no place for the remainder and it should be neglected. After reviewing more badly divergent series like 1 + 2 + 4 + 8 + · · ·, where he judges his opponents to have firmer support, Euler seeks to define away the issue:

Yet however substantial this particular dispute seems to be, neither side can be convicted of any error by the other side, whenever the use of such series occurs in analysis, and this ought to be a strong argument that neither side is in error, but that all disagreement is solely verbal. For if in a calculation I arrive at this series 1 − 1 + 1 − 1 + 1 − 1 etc. and if in its place I substitute 1/2, no one will rightly impute to me an error, which however everyone would do had I put some other number in the place of this series. Whence no doubt can remain that in fact the series 1 − 1 + 1 − 1 + 1 − 1 + etc. and the fraction 1/2 are equivalent quantities and that it is always permitted to substitute one for the other without error. Thus the whole question is seen to reduce to this, whether we call the fraction 1/2 the correct sum of 1 − 1 + 1 − 1 + etc.; and it is strongly to be feared that those who insist on denying this and who at the same time do not dare to deny the equivalence have stumbled into a battle over words. But I think all this wrangling can be easily ended if we should carefully attend to what follows…

Euler also used finite differences to attack 1 − 1 + 1 − 1 + · · ·. In modern terminology, he took the Euler transform of the sequence and found that it equalled ^{1}/_{2}. As late as 1864, De Morgan claims that "this transformation has always appeared one of the strongest presumptions in favour of 1 − 1 + 1 − … being ^{1}/_{2}."

== Dilution and new values ==
Despite the confident tone of his papers, Euler expressed doubt over divergent series in his correspondence with Nicolaus I Bernoulli. Euler claimed that his attempted definition had never failed him, but Bernoulli pointed out a clear weakness: it does not specify how one should determine "the" finite expression that generates a given infinite series. Not only is this a practical difficulty, it would be theoretically fatal if a series were generated by expanding two expressions with different values. Euler's treatment of 1 − 1 + 1 − 1 + · · · rests upon his firm belief that ^{1}/_{2} is the only possible value of the series; what if there were another?

In a 1745 letter to Christian Goldbach, Euler claimed that he was not aware of any such counterexample, and in any case Bernoulli had not provided one. Several decades later, when Jean-Charles Callet finally asserted a counterexample, it was aimed at 1 − 1 + 1 − 1 + · · ·. The background of the new idea begins with Daniel Bernoulli in 1771.

=== Daniel Bernoulli ===
- Bernoulli, Daniel (1771). "De summationibus serierum quarunduam incongrue veris earumque interpretatione atque usu". Novi Commentarii Academiae Scientiarum Imperialis Petropolitanae. 16: 71–90.

Daniel Bernoulli, who accepted the probabilistic argument that 1 − 1 + 1 − 1 + · · · = ^{1}/_{2}, noticed that by inserting 0s into the series in the right places, it could achieve any value between 0 and 1. In particular, the argument suggested that

1 + 0 − 1 + 1 + 0 − 1 + 1 + 0 − 1 + · · · = ^{2}/_{3}.

=== Callet and Lagrange ===
In a memorandum sent to Joseph Louis Lagrange toward the end of the century, Callet pointed out that 1 − 1 + 1 − 1 + · · · could also be obtained from the series

$$\frac{1+x}{1+x+x^2}=1-x^2+x^3-x^5+x^6-x^8+\cdots;$$

substituting x = 1 now suggests a value of ^{2}/_{3}, not ^{1}/_{2}. Lagrange approved Callet's submission for publication in the Mémoires of the French Academy of Sciences, but it was never directly published. Instead, Lagrange (along with Charles Bossut) summarized Callet's work and responded to it in the Mémoires of 1799. He defended Euler by suggesting that Callet's series actually should be written with the 0 terms left in:

$$1+0-x^2+x^3+0-x^5+x^6+0-x^8+\cdots,$$

which reduces to

1 + 0 − 1 + 1 + 0 − 1 + 1 + 0 − 1 + · · ·

instead.

== 19th century ==
The 19th century is remembered as the approximate period of Cauchy's and Abel's largely successful ban on the use of divergent series, but Grandi's series continued to make occasional appearances. Some mathematicians did not follow Abel's lead, mostly outside France, and British mathematicians especially took "a long time" to understand the analysis coming from the continent.

In 1803, Robert Woodhouse proposed that 1 − 1 + 1 − 1 + · · · summed to something called

$$\frac{1}{1+1},$$

which could be distinguished from ^{1}/_{2}. Ivor Grattan-Guinness remarks on this proposal, "… R. Woodhouse … wrote with admirable honesty on the problems which he failed to understand. … Of course, there is no harm in defining new symbols such as ^{1}/_{1+1}; but the idea is 'formalist' in the unflattering sense, and it does not bear on the problem of the convergence of series."

=== Algebraic reasoning ===
In 1830, a mathematician identified only as "M. R. S." wrote in the Annales de Gergonne on a technique to numerically find fixed points of functions of one variable. If one can transform a problem into the form of an equation x = A + f(x), where A can be chosen at will, then

$$x = A+f(A+f(A+f(\cdots)))$$

should be a solution, and truncating this infinite expression results in a sequence of approximations. Conversely, given the series x = a − a + a − a + · · ·, the author recovers the equation

$$x = a - x,$$

to which the solution is (^{1}/_{2})a.

M. R. S. notes that the approximations in this case are a, 0, a, 0, …, but there is no need for Leibniz's "subtle reasoning". Moreover, the argument for averaging the approximations is problematic in a wider context. For equations not of the form x = A + f(x), M. R. S.'s solutions are continued fractions, continued radicals, and other infinite expressions. In particular, the expression a / (a / (a / · · · ))) should be a solution of the equation x = a/x. Here, M. R. S. writes that based on Leibniz's reasoning, one is tempted to conclude that x is the average of the truncations a, 1, a, 1, …. This average is (1 + a)/2, but the solution to the equation is the square root of a.

Bernard Bolzano criticized M. R. S.' algebraic solution of the series. In reference to the step

$$x = a-a+a-a+\cdots = a-(a-a+a-\cdots),$$

Bolzano charged,

The series within parentheses has clearly not the same set of numbers of that originally indicated with x, as the first term a is missing.

This comment exemplifies Bolzano's intuitively appealing but deeply problematic views on infinity. In his defense, Cantor himself pointed out that Bolzano worked in a time when the concept of the cardinality of a set was absent.

=== De Morgan and company ===
As late as 1844, Augustus De Morgan commented that if a single instance where 1 − 1 + 1 − 1 + · · · did not equal ^{1}/_{2} could be given, he would be willing to reject the entire theory of trigonometric series.

I do not argue with those who reject everything that is not within the providence of arithmetic, but only with those who abandon the use of infinitely divergent series and yet appear to employ finitely divergent series with confidence. Such appears to be the practice, both at home and abroad. They seem perfectly reconciled to 1 − 1 + 1 − 1 + · · ·, but cannot admit 1 + 2 + 4 + · · · = −1.

The whole fabric of periodic series and integrals … would fall instantly if it were shown to be possible that 1 − 1 + 1 − 1 + · · · might be one quantity as a limiting form of A_{0} − A_{1} + A_{2} − · · ·and another as a limiting form of A_{0} − A_{1} + A_{2} − · · ·.

The same volume contains papers by Samuel Earnshaw and J. R. Young dealing in part with 1 − 1 + 1 − 1 + · · ·. G. H. Hardy dismisses both of these as "little more than nonsense", in contrast to De Morgan's "remarkable mixture of acuteness and confusion"; in any case, Earnshaw got De Morgan's attention with the following remarks:

…it is not very unusual to cast a mantle of mystery over this subject, by introducing zeros into the expansion of ^{1}/_{1+1+1}. But such a device, however much it may serve to satisfy the eye, cannot satisfy the head…

De Morgan fired back in 1864 in the same journal:

I cannot approve of introducing ciphers to satisfy the eye: but to me they always introduced themselves. … those who reject casual evanescents out of a routine of operation have no right to charge those who do not reject with introduction.

== Frobenius and modern mathematics ==
The last scholarly article to be motivated by 1 − 1 + 1 − 1 + · · · might be identified as the first article in the modern history of divergent series. Georg Frobenius published an article titled "Ueber die Leibnitzsche Reihe" (On Leibniz's series) in 1880. He had found Leibniz's old letter to Wolff, citing it along with an 1836 article by Joseph Ludwig Raabe, who in turn drew on ideas by Leibniz and Daniel Bernoulli.

Frobenius' short paper, barely two pages, begins by quoting from Leibniz's treatment of 1 − 1 + 1 − 1 + · · ·. He infers that Leibniz was actually stating a generalization of Abel's Theorem. The result, now known as Frobenius' theorem, has a simple statement in modern terms: any series that is Cesàro summable is also Abel summable to the same sum. Historian Giovanni Ferraro emphasizes that Frobenius did not actually state the theorem in such terms, and Leibniz did not state it at all. Leibniz was defending the association of the divergent series 1 − 1 + 1 − 1 + · · · with the value ^{1}/_{2}, while Frobenius' theorem is stated in terms of convergent sequences and the epsilon-delta formulation of the limit of a function.

Frobenius' theorem was soon followed with further generalizations by Otto Hölder and Thomas Joannes Stieltjes in 1882. Again, to a modern reader their work strongly suggests new definitions of the sum of a divergent series, but those authors did not yet make that step. Ernesto Cesàro proposed a systematic definition for the first time in 1890. Since then, mathematicians have explored many different summability methods for divergent series. Most of these, especially the simpler ones with historical parallels, sum Grandi's series to ^{1}/_{2}. Others, motivated by Daniel Bernoulli's work, sum the series to another value, and a few do not sum it at all.
