= Analytical Society =

19th-century British organisation for the promotion of Leibniz's calculus

The Analytical Society was a group of individuals in early-19th-century Britain whose aim was to promote the use of Leibnizian notation for differentiation in calculus as opposed to the Newton notation for differentiation. The latter system came into being in the 18th century as a convention of Sir Isaac Newton, and was in use throughout Great Britain. According to a mathematical historian:

In 1800, English mathematics was trapped in the doldrums of fluxional notation and of an intuitive geometric-physical approach to mathematics designed to prepare the student for reading Newton's Principia...The study of any mathematics not pertinent to the traditional questions of Tripos was not only ignored, but actually discouraged. Cambridge was isolated, and its students remained ignorant of continental developments.

The Society was first envisioned by Charles Babbage as a parody on the debate of whether Bible texts should be annotated, with Babbage having the notion that his textbook by Sylvestre Lacroix was without need for interpretation once translated. Its membership originally consisted of a group of Cambridge students led by Babbage and including Edward Bromhead.

The Cambridge mathematician Robert Woodhouse had brought the Leibniz notation to England with his book Principles of Analytical Calculation in 1803. While Newton's notation was unsuitable for a function of several variables, Woodhouse showed, for instance, how to find the total differential of $\phi(p, q),$ where φ is a function of p and q:

$$d\phi = \frac{\partial \phi}{\partial p} dp + \frac{\partial \phi}{\partial q} dq .$$

The slow uptake of the continental methods in calculus led to the formation of the Analytical Society by Charles Babbage, John Herschel and George Peacock.

Though the Society was disbanded by 1814 when most of the original members had graduated, its influence continued to be felt. The evidence of Analytical Society work appeared in 1816 when Peacock and Herschel completed the translation of Sylvestre Lacroix's textbook An Elementary Treatise on Differential and Integral Calculus that had been started by Babbage. In 1817 Peacock introduced Leibnizian symbols in that year's examinations in the local senate-house.

Both the exam and the textbook met with little criticism until 1819, when both were criticised by D.M. Peacock, vicar of Sedbergh, 1796 to 1840. He wrote:

The University should be more on its guard ... against the introduction of merely algebraic or analytical speculations into its public examinations.

Nevertheless, the reforms were encouraged by younger members of Cambridge University. George Peacock successfully encouraged a colleague, Richard Gwatkin of St John's College at Cambridge University, to adopt the new notation in his exams.

Use of Leibnizian notation began to spread after this. In 1820, the notation was used by William Whewell, a previously neutral but influential Cambridge University faculty member, in his examinations. In 1821, Peacock again used Leibnizian notation in his examinations, and the notation became well established.

The Society followed its success by publishing two volumes of examples showing the new method. One was by George Peacock on differential and integral calculus; the other was by Herschel on the calculus of finite differences. They were joined in this by Whewell, who in 1819 published a book, An Elementary Treatise on Mechanics, which used the new notation and which became a standard textbook on the subject.

John Ainz, a pupil of Peacock's, published a notable paper in 1826 which showed how to apply Leibnizian calculus on various physical problems.

These activities did not go unnoticed at other universities in Great Britain, and soon they followed Cambridge's example. By 1830, Leibniz notation was widely adopted and used alongside the traditional denotation of differentiation by use of dots as Newton had done.

== See also ==
- History of calculus
- Notation for differentiation
