= William Hepworth Thompson =

English classical scholar

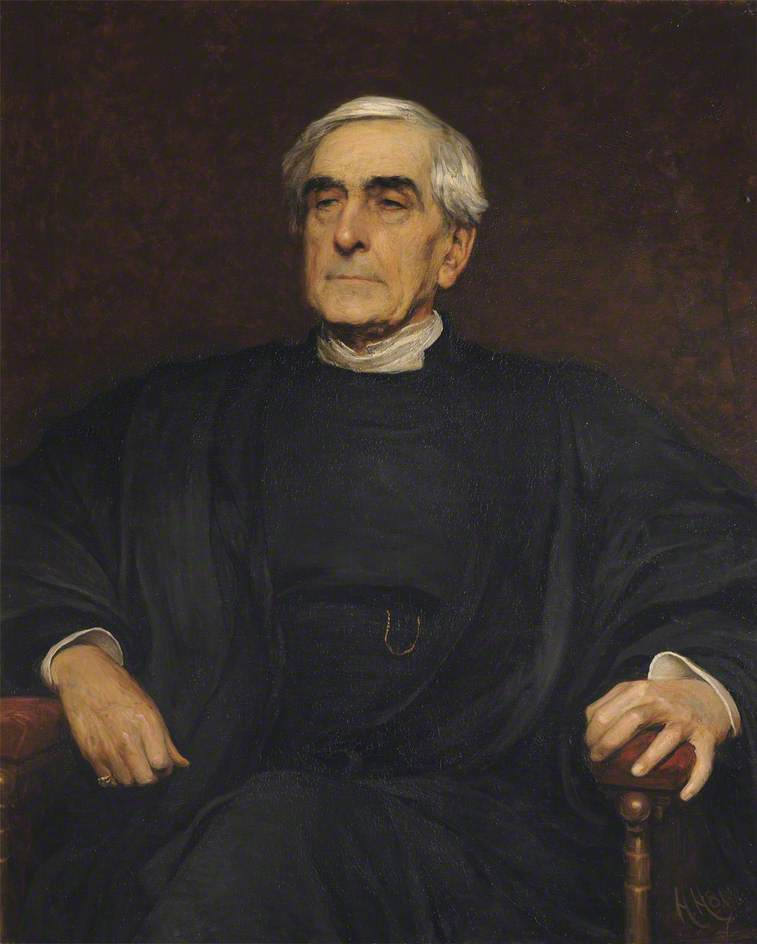
- Portrait of Thompson by Hubert von Herkomer, 1881
- Born: 27 March 1810; York, Yorkshire, England
- Died: 1 October 1886 (aged 76); Cambridge, Cambridgeshire, England
- Education: Trinity College, Cambridge
- Spouse: Frances Elizabeth Peacock (nee Selwyn)
- Scientific career
- Fields: Classicist
- Institutions: Trinity College, Cambridge

William Hepworth Thompson (27 March 1810 – 1 October 1886) was an English classical scholar and Master of Trinity College, Cambridge.

== Early life ==
Thompson was born at York and was privately educated in Buckinghamshire before entering Trinity College, Cambridge in 1828.

== Career ==
Graduating BA as 4th classic in 1832, he became a Fellow of Trinity in 1834. In 1853 he was appointed Professor of Greek (to which a canonry in Ely Cathedral was then for the first time attached), and in 1866 Master of Trinity College. Also in 1866, he married Frances Elizabeth, daughter of William Selwyn, widow of George Peacock. With the exception of the year 1836, when he acted as headmaster of a newly established school in Leicester, his life was divided between Cambridge and Ely. Thompson died in Cambridge, at the Master's Lodge, twenty years after being appointed Master.

Thompson had succeeded William Whewell as Master and proved a worthy successor; the twenty years of his mastership were years of progress, and he himself took an active part in the abolition of tests (in particular the compulsory religious tests) and the reform of university studies and of the college statutes. In Trinity College An Historical Sketch, G. M. Trevelyan notes:

But Thompson and the society over which he presided (1866–1886) were more ready than their predecessors to accept and even to promote changes long overdue. Trinity men were now in the forefront of the reform movement in Cambridge, no longer deprecating but welcoming the help of Parliament to remove from the living academic body the shackles of an age out-worn.

The efforts Thompson and others played an important role in transforming Trinity College and Cambridge University into more meritocratic institutions.

As a scholar Thompson devoted his attention almost entirely to Plato; and his Phaedrus (1868) and Gorgias (1871), with especially valuable introductions, remained as the standard English editions of these two dialogues for over forty years.

The quote "We are none of us infallible, not even the youngest of us" is attributed to Thompson and is recorded in Collections and Recollections by George W. E. Russell (1898) and also in Trinity College An Historical Sketch by G.M. Trevelyan (1943). Thompson uttered these words while Master of Trinity at a College Meeting of the Fellowship on 30 March 1878. As noted above, this was a time of great reformation within the college, willingly supported by Thompson. Gerald Balfour, then a junior Fellow of the college, later politician and Chief Secretary for Ireland, proposed a revision of the College Statutes. The quote was, as Trevelyan puts it, "directed in a kindly spirit at the reforming zeal of a group of junior Fellows". Incidentally, the motion was seconded by Coutts Trotter, one of the most senior Fellows.

Academic offices
| Preceded by William Whewell | Master of Trinity College, Cambridge; 1866–1886 | Succeeded by Henry Montagu Butler |
