= John Philips Higman =

English priest and mathematician

John Philips Higman FRS (1793, Kingsbridge, Devonshire – 7 August 1855, Cambridge Terrace, Hyde Park, London) was an Anglican rector and mathematician.

At age 19, Higman matriculated on 2 June 1812 at Trinity College, Cambridge, where he graduated B.A. (3rd Wrangler) in 1816 and M.A. in 1819. In 1818, he was a Fellow of Trinity College and from 1822 to 1834 he was a tutor there. The students he tutored included Augustus De Morgan and John Grote. On 23 May 1820 Higman was elected F.R.S. On 28 October 1821 he was ordained an Anglican priest (at Ely). In 1823 he gave the Rede Lecture in Philosophy. From 1834 to 1855, he was Rector of the Anglican Parish of Fakenham, Norfolk.

On 28 March 1837, he married Anastasia Read (born 1818).

== Selected publications ==
- A Syllabus of the Differential and Integral Calculus (1826)
