= Lacroix (crater) =

Lunar surface depression

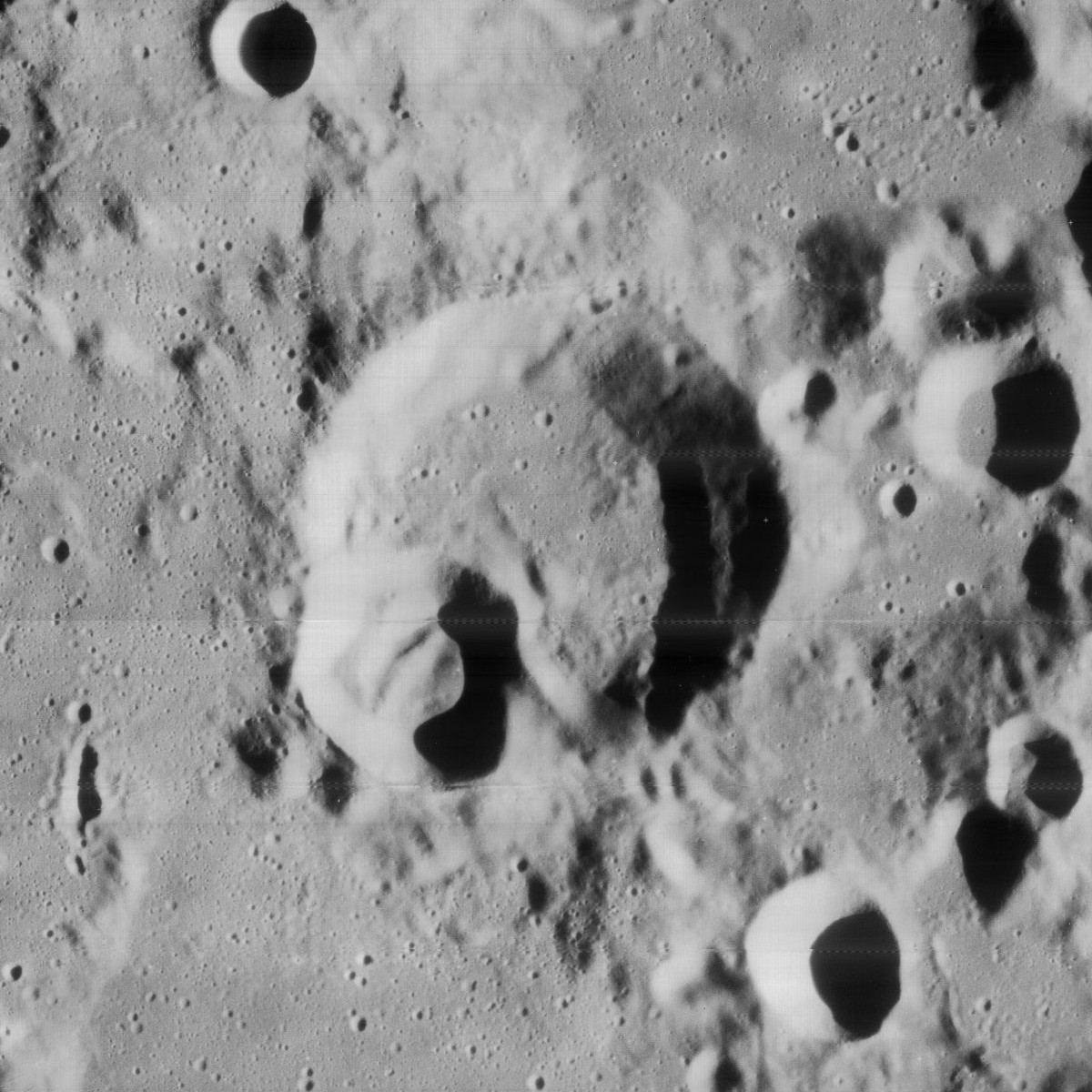
- Lunar Orbiter 4 image
- Coordinates: 37.9°S 59.0°W
- Diameter: 38 km
- Depth: 1.6 km
- Colongitude: 59° at sunrise
- Eponym: Sylvestre F. de Lacroix

Lacroix is a crater that is located in the southwest part of the Moon, to the northwest of the large walled plain named Schickard. The most notable feature of this crater is the smaller crater Lacroix J that overlies the southern rim. The surviving rim of Lacroix is nearly circular, with a slightly worn inner wall. The interior floor is relatively featureless.

== Satellite craters ==
By convention these features are identified on lunar maps by placing the letter on the side of the crater midpoint that is closest to Lacroix.

Lacroix	Latitude	Longitude	Diameter
A	35.1° S	55.2° W	13 km
B	37.0° S	60.4° W	8 km
E	40.0° S	62.9° W	19 km
F	40.7° S	61.6° W	15 km
G	36.7° S	59.1° W	47 km
H	38.6° S	57.8° W	13 km
J	38.4° S	59.3° W	18 km
K	35.2° S	57.7° W	45 km
L	35.7° S	58.3° W	8 km
M	36.0° S	56.9° W	13 km
N	37.2° S	57.8° W	14 km
P	35.2° S	53.7° W	9 km
R	34.5° S	60.1° W	19 km
