= Thomas Baxter (mathematician) =

Thomas Baxter (fl. 1732–1740), was a schoolmaster and mathematician who published an erroneous method of squaring the circle. He was derided as a "pseudo-mathematician" by F. Y. Edgeworth, writing for the Dictionary of National Biography.

When he was master of a private school at Crathorne, North Yorkshire, Baxter composed a book entitled The Circle squared (London: 1732), published in octavo. The mathematical book begins with the untrue assertion that "if the diameter of a circle be unity or one, the circumference of that circle will be 3.0625", where the value should correctly be pi. From this incorrect assumption, Baxter proves fourteen geometric theorems on circles, alongside some others on cones and ellipses, which Edgeworth refers to as of "equal absurdity" to Baxter's other assertions. Thomas Gent, who published the work, wrote in his reminisces, in The Life of Mr. Thomas Gent, that "as it never proved of any effect, it was converted to waste paper, to the great mortification of the author".

This book has received harsh reviews from modern mathematicians and scholars. Antiquary Edward Peacock referred to it as "no doubt, great rubbish". Mathematician Augustus De Morgan included Baxter's proof among his Budget of Paradoxes (1872), dismissing it as an absurd work.

Baxter published another work, Matho, or the Principles of Astronomy and Natural Philosophy accommodated to the Use of Younger Persons (London: 1740). Unlike Baxter's other work, this volume enjoyed considerable popularity in its time.
