= Sylvestre François Lacroix =

French mathematician (1765–1843)

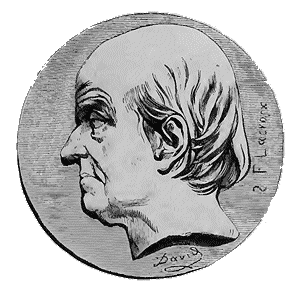
- Born: 28 April 1765; Paris, France
- Died: 24 May 1843 (aged 78); Paris, France
- Scientific career
- Fields: Mathematics
- Academic advisors: Gaspard Monge

Sylvestre François Lacroix (28 April 1765 – 24 May 1843) was a French mathematician.

== Life ==
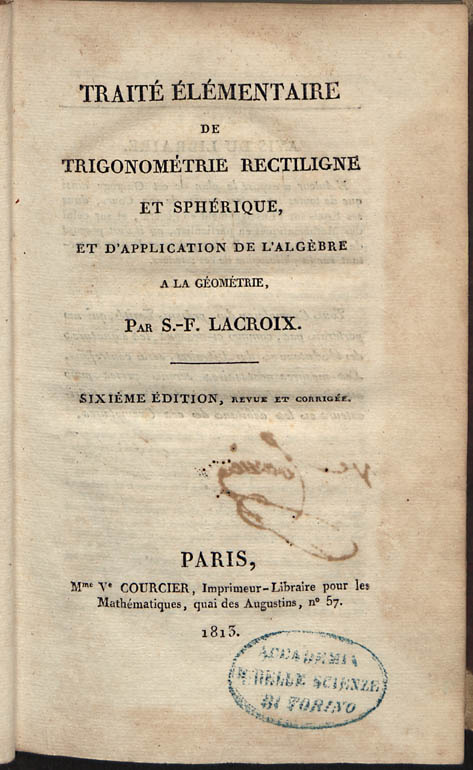
Traité élémentaire de trigonométrie rectiligne et sphérique, et d'application de l'algèbre à la géométrie, 1813

He was born in Paris, and was raised in a poor family who still managed to obtain a good education for their son. Lacroix's path to mathematics started with the novel Robinson Crusoe. That gave him an interest in sailing and thus navigation too. At that point geometry captured his interest and the rest of mathematics followed. He had courses with Antoine-René Mauduit at College Royale de France and Joseph-Francois Marie at Collége Mazaine of University of Paris. In 1779 he obtained some lunar observations of Pierre Charles Le Monnier and began to calculate the variables of lunar theory. The next year he followed some lectures of Gaspard Monge.

In 1782 at the age of 17 he became an instructor in mathematics at the École de Gardes de la Marine in Rochefort. Monge was the students' examiner and Lacroix's supervisor there until 1795. Returning to Paris, Condorcet hired Lacroix to fill in for him as instructor of gentlemen at a Paris lycée. In 1787 he began to teach at École Royale Militaire de Paris and he married Marie Nicole Sophie Arcambal.

In Besançon, from 1788, he taught courses at the École Royale d'Artillerie under examiner Pierre-Simon Laplace. The posting in Besançon lasted until 1793 when Lacroix returned to Paris.

It was the best of times and the worst of times: Lavoisier had opened inquiry into "new chemistry", a subject Lacroix studied with Jean Henri Hassenfratz. He also joined Societe Philomatique de Paris which provided a journal in which to communicate his findings. On the other hand, Paris was in the grip of the Reign of Terror. In 1794 Lacroix became director of the Executive Committee for Public Instruction. In this position he promoted École Normale and the system of Écoles Centrales. In 1795 he taught at École Centrale des Quatres-Nations.

The first volume Traité du Calcul Différentiel et du Calcul Intégral was published in 1797. Legendre predicted that it "will make itself conspicuous by the choice of methods, their generality, and the rigor of the demonstrations." In hindsight Ivor Grattan-Guinness observed:

The Traite is by far the most comprehensive work of its kind for that time. The extent of its circulation is not known and it may not have been very large...But it is as well known as any other treatise of its time, and certainly more worth reading than any other, especially for the emerging generation.

In 1799, he became professor of analysis at École Polytechnique.

Lacroix was the author of at least 17 biographies contributed to Biographie Universalle compiled by Louis Gabriel Michaud.

In 1809, he was admitted to Faculté des Sciences de Paris.

In 1812, he began teaching at the Collège de France, and was appointed chair of mathematics in 1815.

When a second edition of the Traité du Calcul Différentiel et du Calcul Intégral was published in three volumes in 1810, 1814, and 1819, Lacroix renewed the text:

New material, recording many of the advances made during the new century, were introduced throughout the text, which was rounded off by a long list of "Corrections and additions" and a splendid "Table of contents". In addition, the structure of the work was changed somewhat, especially the third volume on series and differences. But the general impression is still that the main streams and directions of the calculus had been amplified and enriched, rather than changed in any substantial way.

During his career, he produced a number of important textbooks in mathematics. Translations of these books into the English language were used in British universities, and the books remained in circulation for nearly 50 years.

In 1812, Babbage set up the Analytical Society for the translation of Differential and Integral Calculus and the book was translated into English in 1816 by George Peacock.

He died on 24 May 1843 in Paris.

Lacroix crater on the Moon was named for him.

== Publications ==
- Traité du Calcul Différentiel et du Calcul Intégral, Courcier, Paris, 1797-1800.
  - 1797: Premier Tome, link from Internet Archive.
  - 1798: Tome Second, link from Internet Archive.
  - 1800: Tome 3: Traité des Différences et des Séries, link from Internet Archive.
- 1802: Traité Élémentaire du Calcul Différentiel et du Calcul Intégral, link from HathiTrust.
  - Revised and re-published several times; the 9th edition appeared in 1881.
- 1804: Complément des Élémens d'algèbre, à l'usage de l'École Centrale des Quatre-Nations, Courcier, Paris, 5th edition (1825), link from Internet Archive.
- 1814: Eléments de Géométrie à l'usage de l'École Centrale des Quatre-Nations, 10th edition, link from HathiTrust.
- 1816: Traité élémentaire de calcul des probabilités, Paris, Mallet-Bachelier, link from HathiTrust.
- 1816: Essais sur l'Enseignement en Général, et sur celui des Mathématiques en Particulier, link from Internet Archive.
