= George Peacock =

English mathematician and Anglican cleric (1791–1858)

The Reverend George Peacock FRS
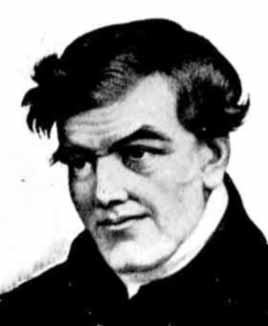
- Born: 9 April 1791; Thornton Hall, Denton, County Durham, England
- Died: 8 November 1858 (aged 67); Pall Mall, London, England
- Education: Trinity College, Cambridge
- Known for: Treatise on Algebra (1830)
- Awards: Smith's Prize (1813)
- Scientific career
- Fields: Mathematician
- Workplaces: Trinity College, Cambridge
- Academic advisors: John Hudson; Adam Sedgwick
- Notable students: George Biddell Airy; Arthur Cayley; Augustus De Morgan; W. H. Thompson

George Peacock (9 April 1791 – 8 November 1858) was an English mathematician and Anglican cleric. He founded what has been called the British algebra of logic.

== Early life ==
Peacock was born on 9 April 1791 at Thornton Hall, Denton, near Darlington, County Durham. His father, Thomas Peacock, was a priest of the Church of England, incumbent and for 50 years curate of the parish of Denton, where he also kept a school. In early life, Peacock did not show any precocity of genius. He was more remarkable for daring feats of climbing than for any special attachment to study. Initially, he received his elementary education from his father and then at Sedbergh School, and at 17 years of age, he was sent to Richmond School under James Tate, a graduate of Cambridge University. At this school, he distinguished himself greatly both in classics and in the rather elementary mathematics then required for entrance at Cambridge. In 1809 he became a student of Trinity College, Cambridge.

In 1813, Peacock took the rank of Second Wrangler, and the second Smith's prize, the senior wrangler being John Herschel. Two years later, he became a candidate for a fellowship in his college and won it immediately, partly by means of his extensive and accurate knowledge of the classics. A fellowship then meant about £200 a year, tenable for seven years provided the Fellow did not marry meanwhile, and capable of being extended after the seven years provided the Fellow took clerical orders, which Peacock did in 1819.

== Mathematical career ==
The year after taking a Fellowship, Peacock was appointed a tutor and lecturer of his college, a position that he continued to hold for many years. Peacock, in common with many other students of his own standing, was profoundly impressed with the need of reforming Cambridge's position, ignoring the differential notation for calculus, and while still an undergraduate, formed a league with Babbage and Herschel to adopt measures to bring it about. In 1812, they formed what they called the Analytical Society, the object of which was stated to be to advocate the d 'ism of the Continent versus the dot-age of the university.

The first movement on the part of the Analytical Society was to translate from the French the smaller work of Lacroix on the differential and integral calculus; it was published in 1816. At that time the French language had the best manuals, as well as the greatest works on mathematics. Peacock followed up the translation with a volume containing a copious Collection of Examples of the Application of the Differential and Integral Calculus, which was published in 1820. The sale of both books was rapid, and contributed materially to further the object of the Society. In that time, high wranglers of one year became the examiners of the mathematical tripos three or four years afterwards. Peacock was appointed an examiner in 1817, and he did not fail to make use of the position as a powerful lever to advance the cause of reform. In his questions set for the examination, the differential notation was for the first time officially employed in Cambridge. The innovation did not escape censure, but he wrote to a friend as follows:

"I assure you that I shall never cease to exert myself to the utmost in the cause of reform, and that I will never decline any office which may increase my power to effect it. I am nearly certain of being nominated to the office of Moderator in the year 1818-1819, and as I am an examiner in virtue of my office, for the next year I shall pursue a course even more decided than hitherto, since I shall feel that men have been prepared for the change, and will then be enabled to have acquired a better system by the publication of improved elementary books. I have considerable influence as a lecturer, and I will not neglect it. It is by silent perseverance only, that we can hope to reduce the many-headed monster of prejudice and make the University answer her character as the loving mother of good learning and science."

These few sentences give an insight into the character of Peacock: he was an ardent reformer, and a few years brought success to the cause of the Analytical Society.

Another reform at which Peacock labored was the teaching of algebra. In 1830, he published A Treatise on Algebra which had for its object the placing of algebra on a true scientific basis, adequate for the development which it had received at the hands of the Continental mathematicians. To elevate astronomical science, the Astronomical Society of London was founded, and the three reformers Peacock, Babbage, and Herschel were again prime movers in the undertaking. Peacock was one of the most zealous promoters of an astronomical observatory at Cambridge and one of the founders of the Philosophical Society of Cambridge.

In 1831, the British Association for the Advancement of Science held its first meeting in the ancient city of York. One of the first resolutions adopted was to procure reports on the state and progress of particular sciences, to be drawn up from time to time by competent persons for the information of the annual meetings, and the first to be placed on the list was a report on the progress of mathematical science. William Whewell was a vice-president of the meeting; he was instructed to select the reporter. He first asked William Rowan Hamilton, who declined; he then asked Peacock, who accepted. Peacock had his report ready for the third meeting of the Association, which was held in Cambridge in 1833; it covered Algebra, Trigonometry, and the Arithmetic of Sines.

In 1837, Peacock was appointed Lowndean Professor of Astronomy in the University of Cambridge. An object of reform was the statutes of the university; he worked hard at it and was made a member of a commission appointed by the Government for the purpose.

He was elected a Fellow of the Royal Society in January 1818.

In 1842, Peacock was elected as a member of the American Philosophical Society.

== Clerical career ==
Peacock was ordained as a deacon in 1819, a priest in 1822, and appointed vicar of Wymeswold in Leicestershire in 1826 (until 1835).

In 1839, he was appointed Dean of Ely cathedral, Cambridgeshire, a position he held for the rest of his life, some 20 years. Together with the architect George Gilbert Scott, he undertook a major restoration of the cathedral building. This included the installation of the boarded ceiling.

While holding this position he wrote a text book on algebra, A Treatise on Algebra (1830). Later, a second edition appeared in two volumes, the one called Arithmetical Algebra (1842) and the other On Symbolical Algebra and its Applications to the Geometry of Position (1845).

== Symbolical algebra ==
Peacock's main contribution to mathematical analysis is his attempt to place algebra on a strictly logical basis. He founded what has been called the British algebra of logic; to which Gregory, De Morgan and Boole belonged. His answer to Maseres and Frend was that the science of algebra consisted of two parts—arithmetical algebra and symbolical algebra—and that they erred in restricting the science to the arithmetical part. His view of arithmetical algebra was one that did not use negative numbers, rational numbers, or the combination of different types of numbers; he defined symbolical algebra as arithmetical algebra without its restrictions on the form and value of quantities.

One of the earliest English writers on arithmetic is Robert Recorde, who dedicated his work to King Edward VI.

The fact is that even in arithmetic the two processes of multiplication and division are generalized into a common multiplication; and the difficulty consists in passing from the original idea of multiplication to the generalized idea of a tensor, which idea includes compressing the magnitude as well as stretching it. Let $m$ denote an integer number; the next step is to gain the idea of the reciprocal of $m$, not as $\frac{1}{m}$ but simply as $/m$. When $m$ and $/n$ are compounded, we get the idea of a rational fraction; for in general $m/n$ will not reduce to a number nor to the reciprocal of a number.

The principle here indicated by means of examples was named by Peacock the "principle of the permanence of equivalent forms," and in his treatise it is thus enunciated: "Whatever algebraic forms are equivalent when the symbols are general in form, but specific in value, will be equivalent likewise when the symbols are general in value as well as in form."

For example, let $a$, $b$, $c$, $d$ denote any integer numbers, but subject to the restrictions that $b$ is less than $a$, and $d$ less than $c$; it may then be shown arithmetically that $(a - b)(c - d)=ac + bd - ad - bc$. Peacock's principle says that the form on the left side is equivalent to the form on the right side, not only when the said restrictions of being less are removed, but when $a$, $b$, $c$, $d$ denote the most general algebraic symbol. It means that $a$, $b$, $c$, $d$ may be rational fractions, or surds, or imaginary quantities, or indeed operators such as $\frac{d}{dx}$. The equivalence is not established by means of the nature of the quantity denoted; the equivalence is assumed to be true, and then it is attempted to find the different interpretations which may be put on the symbol.

It is not difficult to see that the problem before us involves the fundamental problem of a rational logic or theory of knowledge; namely, how are we able to ascend from particular truths to more general truths? If $a$, $b$, $c$, $d$ denote integer numbers, of which $b$ is less than $a$ and $d$ less than $c$, then $(a - b)(c - d)=ac + bd - ad - bc$.

It is first seen that the above restrictions may be removed, and still the above equation holds. But the antecedent is still too narrow; the true scientific problem consists in specifying the meaning of the symbols, which, and only which, will admit of the forms being equal. It is not to find "some meanings", but the "most general meaning", which allows the equivalence to be true. Let us examine some other cases; we shall find that Peacock's principle is not a solution of the difficulty; the great logical process of generalization cannot be reduced to any such easy and arbitrary procedure. When $a$, $m$, $n$ denote integer numbers, it can be shown that $a^{m}a^{n} = a^{m+n}$.

According to Peacock, the form on the left is always to be equal to the form on the right, and the meanings of $a$, $m$, $n$ are to be found by interpretation. Suppose that $a$ takes the form of the incommensurate quantity $e$, the base of the natural system of logarithms. A number is a degraded form of a complex quantity $p+q^{\sqrt{-1}}$ and a complex quantity is a degraded form of a quaternion; consequently one meaning which may be assigned to $m$ and $n$ is that of quaternion. Peacock's principle would lead us to suppose that $e^{m}e^{n} = e^{m+n}$, $m$ and $n$ denoting quaternions; but that is just what William Rowan Hamilton, the inventor of the quaternion generalization, denies. There are reasons for believing that he was mistaken, and that the forms remain equivalent even under that extreme generalization of $m$ and $n$; but the point is this: it is not a question of conventional definition and formal truth; it is a question of objective definition and real truth. Let the symbols have the prescribed meaning; does or does not the equivalence still hold? And if it does not hold, what is the higher or more complex form which the equivalence assumes? Or does such equivalence form even exist?

== Private life ==
Politically, George Peacock was a Whig. He married Frances Elizabeth, the daughter of William Selwyn. They had no children.

His last public act was to attend a meeting of the university reform commission. He died in Ely on 8 November 1858, in the 68th year of his age, and was buried in Ely cemetery.

== Bibliography ==
- A Treatise on Algebra (J. & J. J. Deighton, 1830).
- A Treatise on Algebra (2nd ed., Scripta Mathematica, 1842–1845).
  - Vol. 1: Arithmetical Algebra (1842).
  - Vol. 2: On Symbolical Algebra and its Applications to the Geometry of Position (1845)
- Life of Thomas Young: M.D., F.R.S., &c.; and One of the Eight Foreign Associates of the National Institute of France (John Murray, 1855).

== Sources ==
- Macfarlane, Alexander (2009) [1916]. Lectures on Ten British Mathematicians of the Nineteenth Century. Mathematical monographs. Vol. 17. Cornell University Library. ISBN 978-1-112-28306-2. (complete text at Project Gutenberg)

Church of England titles
Preceded by James Wood	Dean of Ely; 1839–1858	Succeeded by Harvey Goodwin
