= Charles James Hargreave =

English judge and mathematician

Charles James Hargreave (4 December 1820 – 23 April 1866) was an English judge and mathematician.

== Life ==
The eldest son of James Hargreave, woollen manufacturer, he was born at Wortley, Leeds, Yorkshire, in December 1820. He was educated at Bramham, near Leeds, and at University College, London, and took the degree of LL.B. with honours in the university of London. He passed some months in the office of a solicitor, and afterwards was the pupil of Richard James Greening, and then of Lewis Duval.

He was called to the bar at the Inner Temple 7 June 1844, and for some time assisted Jonathan Henry Christie as his draughtsman, but soon had an increasing business of his own. In 1843 he was appointed professor of jurisprudence in University College, a position which he held until his move from London in 1849.

Near the end of the Irish famine, in 1849, the Encumbered Estates' Court of three commissioners, of which Hargreave was one, was appointed to sit in Dublin to receive applications by creditors for the sale of Irish estates, which had until then been prevented by the feudal property law of "fee tail". Hargreave received a salary of £2,000 a year. In August 1849 he took up his residence in Dublin, where for nine years he was occupied with official duties. The amount of work accomplished by the court during this period was large, with important part being reading in private of titles, statements, petitions, and affidavits. The applications being made ex parte, the rights of absent persons, infants and others, had to be protected by the commissioners themselves. The number of petitions filed from October 1849 to 31 August 1857 was 4,413. The lands sold on these petitions were conveyed to the purchasers by means of upwards of eight thousand deeds of conveyance. The gross amount produced by sales of estates was £25,190,389. Hargreave, in reply to a question put by a parliamentary committee, stated that "no mistake of consequence was ever made by the court".

On the Conservatives coming into power in 1858 a new measure for establishing the court in perpetuity, under the designation of Landed Estate Court, was passed, and of it Hargreave was appointed one of the judges, a position which he held to his death.

In 1851 he was made a bencher of his inn, master of the library 1865, reader 1866, and had he lived would have succeeded to the office of treasurer. In 1852 he was created a Q.C.

He was interested in the subject of a registry of indefeasible title. He approved of Robert Torrens's registry of titles as carried out in South Australia, and when in 1844 Torrens, aided by a committee, formed a plan for establishing a registry of Irish titles, he wrote a lengthy criticism of the scheme in the form of a letter to H. D. Hutton, the secretary of the committee. He was then directed by the government to draw a bill for carrying out this object, and on 10 Aug. 1866, the Record of Title Act being established by 29 & 30 Vict. c. xcix, he arranged to take charge of the judicial business arising out of this new jurisdiction, but was prevented by his last illness.

He died at Bray, near Dublin, 23 April 1866. He married, 3 September 1856, Sarah Hannah, eldest daughter of Thomas Noble of Leeds.

== Works ==
His mathematical essays were numerous. One of the earliest, ‘On the Solution of Linear Differential Equations’ (‘Philosophical Transactions,’ 1848, pp. 31–54), in 1848 he obtained the Royal Medal of the Royal Society, and on 18 April 1844 he was elected a F.R.S. Other papers were: ‘General Methods in Analyses for the Resolution of Linear Equations in Finite Differences’ (ib. 1850, pp. 261–86); ‘On the Problem of Three Bodies’ (‘ Proceedings of the Royal Society,’ 1857–9, pp. 265–73); ‘Analytical Researches concerning Numbers’ (‘London and Edinburgh Philosophical Magazine,’ 1849, xxxv. 36–53); ‘On the Valuation of Life Contingencies’ (ib. 1853, v. 39–45); ‘Applications of the Calculus of Operations to Algebraic Expansions and Theorems’ (ib. 1853, vi. 351–63); ‘On the Law of Prime Numbers’ (ib. 1854, viii. 14–22); ‘Differential Equations of the First Order’ (ib. 1864, xxvii. 355–76).

The honorary degree of LL.D. was conferred on him by the University of Dublin in 1852. In 1866 his attention was again drawn to a new method of solving algebraic equations, and he commenced an essay on this question.
