= William Selwyn (astronomer) =

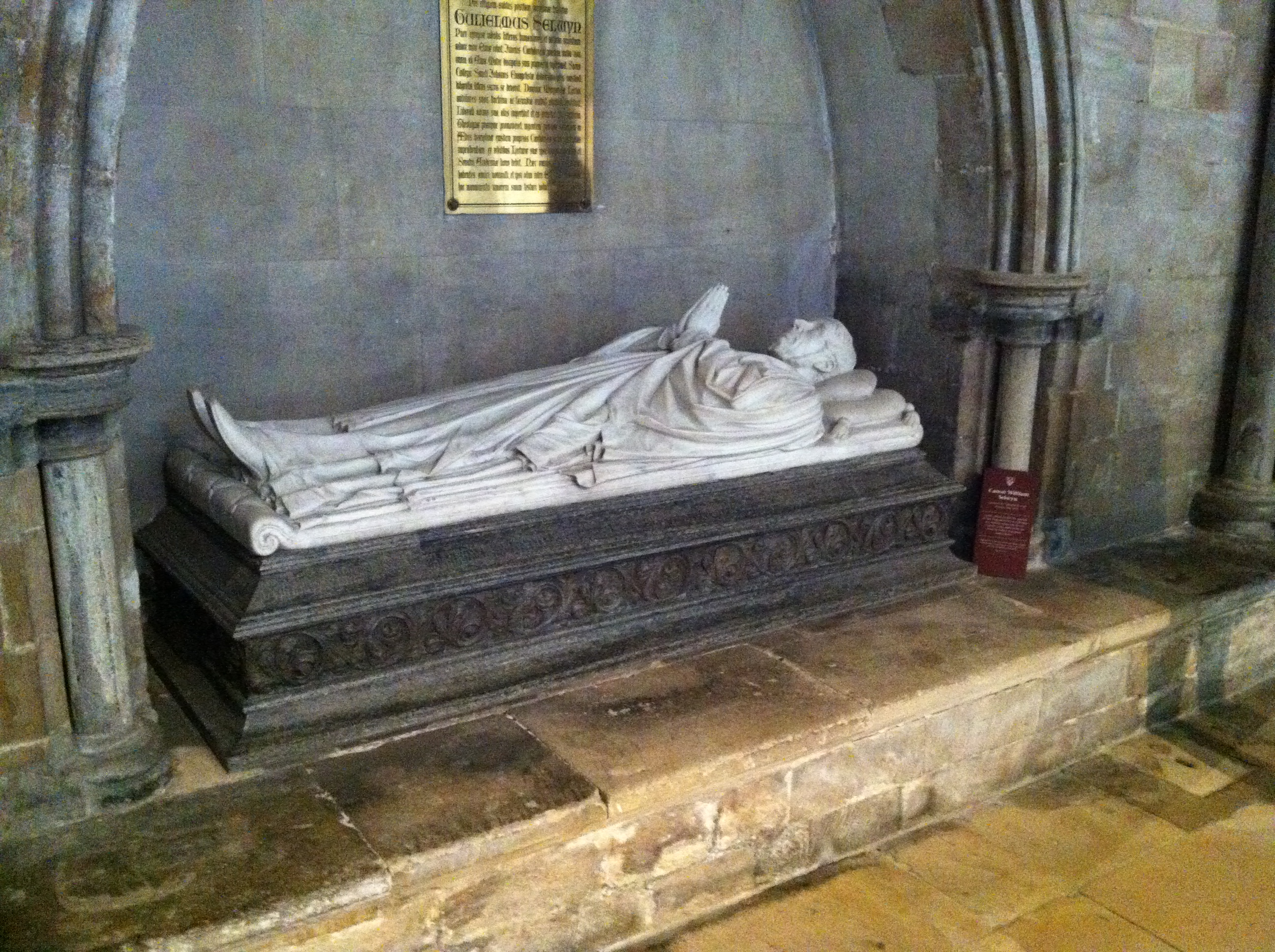
Memorial to William Selwyn in Ely Cathedral

William Selwyn (19 February 1806 – 24 April 1875) was a Church of England clergyman, canon of Ely Cathedral, Lady Margaret's Professor of Divinity, and amateur astronomer.

== Life ==
Selwyn was the eldest surviving son of William Selwyn (1775–1855) and his wife Laetitia, daughter of Thomas Kynaston of Witham, Essex. He was one of four brothers, the most famous being George Augustus Selwyn (1809–1878), the first Anglican bishop of New Zealand, and after whom Selwyn College, Cambridge, was named.

Selwyn was educated at Eton College and St John's College, Cambridge, where he graduated BA in 1828, MA in 1831, BD in 1850 and DD in 1864. He was a Fellow of St John's from 1829 to 1832.

Selwyn was ordained as a deacon of the Church of England in 1829 and as a priest in 1831. He was appointed Rector of Branston, Leicestershire in 1831, Vicar of Melbourn, Cambridgeshire, in 1846 and Canon Residentiary of Ely in 1833, serving in that capacity until 1875. He was also Lady Margaret's Professor of Divinity at Cambridge from 1855 until his death in 1875. He became Honorary Joint Curator of the Library of Lambeth Palace in 1872.

Whilst at Ely he established an observatory in the college, an area of the cathedral precincts containing the houses of senior cathedral clergy. In collaboration with John Persehouse Titterton, a local photographer, he prepared a series of photographs of the solar disc over an entire sunspot cycle from 1863 to 1874 using a six-inch achromatic lens. Selwyn was seriously ill from 1866 onwards and this, together with his ecclesiastical commitments, prevented the work from being published. Instead, the prints were donated to the Royal Greenwich Observatory and Selwyn was elected a Fellow of the Royal Society in 1866 as someone "Distinguished as a promoter of the Science of Astronomy and Especially as having applied photography in making numerous records of the state of the Sun's disk. Eminent as a Scholar and a theologian." He was also an elected Fellow of the Royal Astronomical Society (FRAS).

He died in 1875 aged 69 in consequence of a fall from his horse and has a monument in Ely cathedral. He had married Juliana Elizabeth, daughter of George Cooke of Carr House, Doncaster.
