= Robert Woodhouse =

British mathematician and astronomer (1773–1827)

Robert Woodhouse FRS
- Born: 28 April 1773; Norwich, Norfolk, England
- Died: 23 December 1827 (aged 54); Cambridge, England
- Education: Cambridge University
- Awards: First Smith's Prize (1795)
- Scientific career
- Fields: Mathematics and astronomy

Robert Woodhouse FRS (28 April 1773 – 23 December 1827) was a British mathematician and astronomer.

== Biography ==
=== Early life and education ===
Robert Woodhouse was born on 28 April 1773 in Norwich, Norfolk, the son of Robert Woodhouse, linen draper, and Judith Alderson, the daughter of a Unitarian minister from Lowestoft. Robert junior was baptised at St George's Church, Colegate, Norwich, on 19 May, 1773. A younger son, John Thomas Woodhouse, was born in 1780. The brothers were educated at the Paston School in North Walsham, 24 kilometres (15 mi) north of Norwich.

In May 1790 Woodhouse was admitted to Gonville and Caius College, Cambridge, the college where Paston pupils were traditionally sent. In 1795 he graduated as the Senior Wrangler (ranked first among the mathematics undergraduates at the university), and took the First Smith's Prize. He obtained his Master's degree at Cambridge in 1798.

=== Marriage and career at Cambridge ===
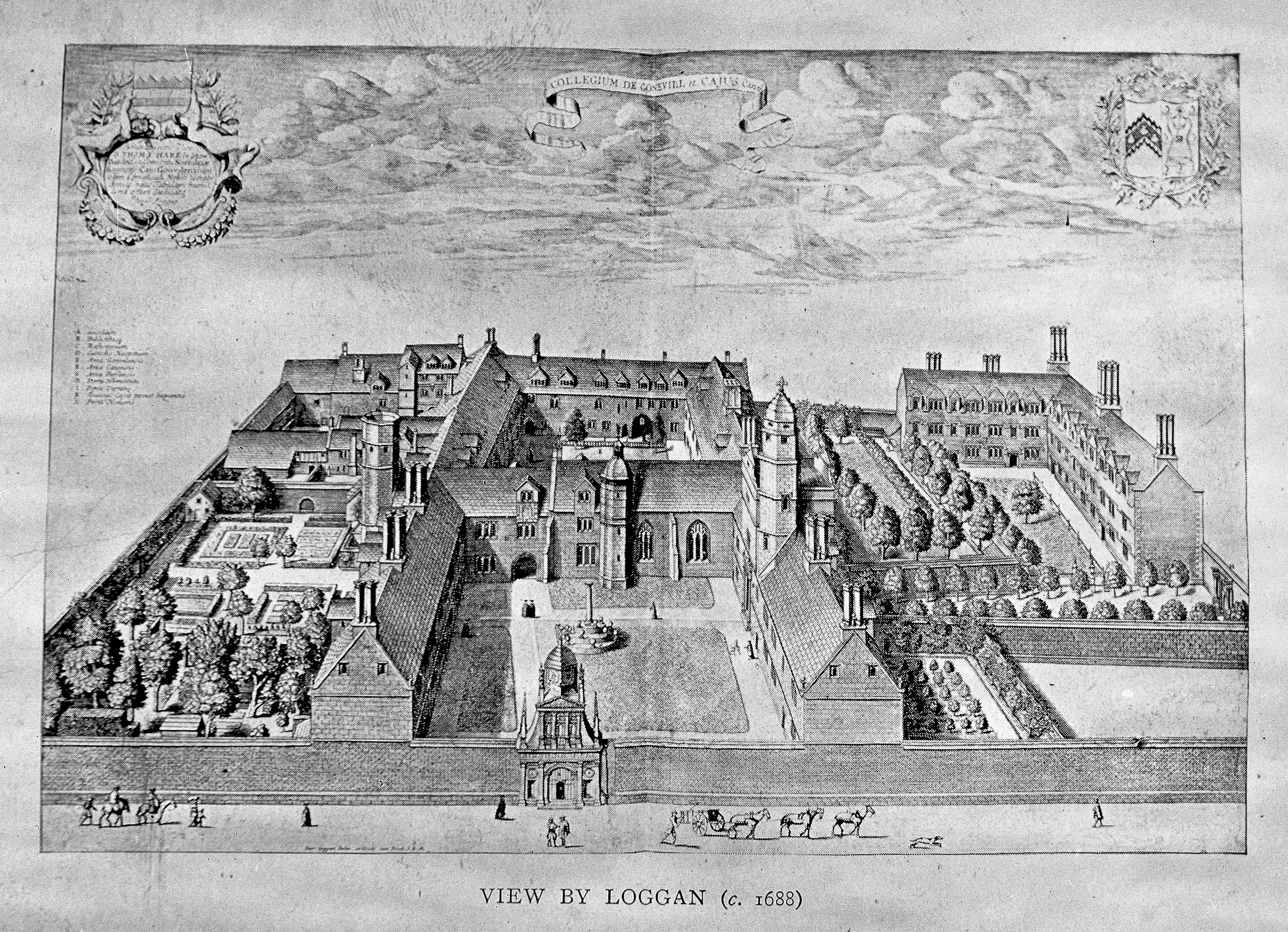
Gonville and Caius College, Cambridge by David Loggan (1688)

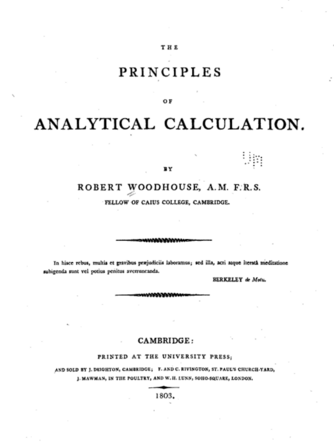
The frontispiece of Woodhouse's Principles of Analytical Calculation (1803)

Woodhouse was a fellow of the college from 1798 to 1823, (Note: Woodhouse's younger brother John was also a fellow at the college.) after which he resigned so as to be able to marry Harriet, the daughter of William Wilkin, a Norwich architect. They were married on 20 February 1823; the marriage produced a son, also named Robert. Harriet Woodhouse died at Cambridge on 31 March 1826.

Woodhouse was elected a Fellow of the Royal Society on 16 December 1802. His earliest work, entitled the Principles of Analytical Calculation, was published at Cambridge in 1803. In this he explained the differential notation and strongly pressed the employment of it; but he severely criticised the methods used by continental writers, and their constant assumption of non-evident principles.

In 1809 Woodhouse published a textbook covering planar trigonometry and spherical trigonometry and the next year a historical treatise on the calculus of variations and isoperimetrical problems. He next produced an astronomy; of which the first book (usually bound in two volumes), on practical and descriptive astronomy, was issued in 1812, and the second book, containing an account of the treatment of physical astronomy by Pierre-Simon Laplace and other continental writers, was issued in 1818.

Woodhouse became the Lucasian Professor of Mathematics in 1820, but the small income caused him to resign the professorship in 1822 and instead accept the better paid post as the Plumian professor in the university. As Plumian Professor he was responsible for installing and adjusting the transit instruments and clocks at the Cambridge Observatory.

Woodhouse did not exercise much influence on the majority of his contemporaries, and the movement might have died away for the time being if it had not been for the advocacy of George Peacock, Charles Babbage, and John Herschel, who formed the Analytical Society, with the object of advocating the general use in the university of analytical methods and of the differential notation. Woodhouse was the first director of the newly built observatory at Cambridge, a post he held until his death in 1827.

On his death in Cambridge he was buried in Caius College chapel.

== Sources ==
- Becher, Harvey W. (1980). "Woodhouse, Babbage, Peacock and Modern Algebra". Historia Mathematica. 7 (4): 389–400. doi:10.1016/0315-0860(80)90003-8.
- Becher, Harvey W. (2004). "Woodhouse, Robert". Oxford Dictionary of National Biography (online ed.). Oxford University Press. doi:10.1093/ref:odnb/29926. OCLC 56568095. (Subscription, Wikipedia Library access or UK public library membership required.) (subscription may be required or content may be available in libraries that are in the UK)
- Guicciardini, Niccolò (1989). "Robert Woodhouse". The Development of Newtonian Calculus in Britain 1700–1800. New York: Cambridge University Press. ISBN 0-521-36466-3.
- Rouse Ball, W.W. (1912). A Short Account Of The History Of Mathematics. London: MacMillan and Co. Ltd. OCLC 844389098.
- Woodhouse, Robert (1825). "Some account of the transit instrument made by Mr. Dollond, and lately put up at the Cambridge Observatory". Philosophical Transactions of the Royal Society of London: 418–428.

=== Further reading ===
- Harman, P. M. (1988). "Newton to Maxwell: The 'Principia' and British Physics". Notes and Records of the Royal Society of London. 42 (1: Newton's 'Principia' and Its Legacy): 75–96. Bibcode:1988npl..conf...75H. doi:10.1098/rsnr.1988.0008. JSTOR 531370. S2CID 122622492.
- Johnson, W. (1995). "Contributors to Improving the Teaching of Calculus in Early 19th-Century England". Notes and Records of the Royal Society of London. 49 (1): 93–103. doi:10.1098/rsnr.1995.0006. JSTOR 531886. S2CID 145534544.
