= William Selwyn (barrister) =

British lawyer

William Selwyn QC (1775–1855) was an English lawyer, known as a legal author.

== Life ==
He was the second son of William Selwyn, treasurer of Lincoln's Inn in 1793, by Frances Elizabeth, daughter of John Dod of Woodford, Essex. George Augustus Selwyn, the wit, was his father's first cousin. He was educated at Eton College, and St. John's and Trinity Colleges, Cambridge, where he graduated B.A. in 1797, as first chancellor's medallist in classics, senior optime in the Mathematical Tripos; and proceeded M.A. in 1800.

From Lincoln's Inn, where Selwyn was admitted a student in 1797, he was called to the bar on 24 November 1807, and was elected treasurer of his Inn in 1840. He went onto the western circuit, was recorder of Portsmouth from 1819 to 1829, and took silk in the Trinity vacation of 1827.

Soon after the marriage of Queen Victoria, Selwyn was chosen to assist Albert, Prince Consort in his legal studies. A valetudinarian in later life, he lived in retirement at Pagoda House, Kew Road, Richmond, Surrey, an estate inherited from his father in 1817. He died on 25 July 1855, while on a visit to Tunbridge Wells, and was buried in the neighbouring churchyard of Rusthall. A road later built near Pagoda House was named Selwyn Avenue after him.

Selwyn provided land for construction of St John the Divine, Richmond. The building was completed in 1836.

== Works ==
Selwyn collaborated with George Maule in Reports of Cases argued and determined in the Court of King's Bench, London, 1814, 2 vols. He was author of Abridgment of the Law of Nisi Prius, 3 parts, London, 1806–8. A successful work, its 13th edition, by David Keane, Q.C., and Charles T. Smith, judge of the Cape of Good Hope, appeared in 1869.

== Family ==
Selwyn married, in 1801, Lætitia Frances (died 1842), youngest daughter of Thomas Kynaston of Witham, Essex, by whom he had four sons:

1. William Selwyn (1806–1875);
2. George Augustus Selwyn (1808–1878), primate of New Zealand and bishop of Lichfield;
3. Thomas Kynaston (1812–1834), educated at Eton and Trinity College, Cambridge, author of Eton in 1829–1830: a diary of Boating and other Events, written in Greek, edited with memoir by Edmond Warre, 1903;
4. Sir Charles Jasper Selwyn (1813-1869);

and one other son who died in infancy.

and two daughters:

1. Lætitia Frances (1807-1886); and
2. Frances Elizabeth (1815-1903), wife of (1) George Peacock, dean of Ely and (2) William Hepworth Thompson, master of Trinity College, Cambridge.

and two other daughters who died in infancy.

== Notes ==
Attribution

This article incorporates text from a publication now in the public domain: "Selwyn, William (1775-1855)". Dictionary of National Biography. London: Smith, Elder & Co. 1885–1900.
