= John Radford Young =

British mathematician (1799–1885)

John Radford Young (8 April 1799 in Southwark – 5 March 1885 in Peckham) was an English mathematician, professor and author, who was almost entirely self-educated. He was born of humble parents in London. At an early age he became acquainted with Olinthus Gilbert Gregory, who perceived his mathematical ability and assisted him in his studies. In 1823, while working in a private establishment for the deaf, he published An Elementary Treatise on Algebra with a dedication to Gregory. This treatise was followed by a series of elementary works, in which, following in the steps of Robert Woodhouse, Young familiarized English students with continental methods of mathematical analysis.

In 1833, he was appointed Professor of Mathematics at Belfast College. When Queen's College, Belfast, opened in 1849, the presbyterian party in control there prevented Young's reappointment as Professor in the new establishment. From that time he devoted himself more completely to the study of mathematical analysis, and made several original discoveries.

In 1847, he published in the Transactions of the Cambridge Philosophical Society a paper "On the Principle of Continuity in reference to certain Results of Analysis", and, in 1848, in the Transactions of the Royal Irish Academy a paper "On an Extension of a Theorem of Euler". As early as 1844, he had discovered and published a proof of Newton's rule for determining the number of imaginary roots in an equation. In 1866, he completed his proof, publishing in The Philosophical Magazine a demonstration of a principle which in his earlier paper he had assumed as axiomatic. In 1868, he contributed to the Proceedings of the Royal Irish Academy a memoir "On the Imaginary Roots of Numerical Equations".

Young died at Peckham on 5 March 1885. He was married and had at least two sons and four daughters.

== Works ==
- An Elementary Treatise on Algebra 1823, 1832, 1834
- Elements of Geometry 1827
- Elements of Analytical Geometry 1830
- An Elementary Essay on the Computation of Logarithms 1830
- The Elements of the Differential Calculus 1831
- The Elements of the Integral Calculus 1831
- The Elements of Mechanics, comprehending Statics and Dynamics 1832
- Elements of Plane and Spherical Trigonometry 1833
- Theory and Solution of Algebraical Equations 1843 (1st edition: 1835)
- Mathematical Dissertations for the Use of Students in the Modern Analysis 1841
- On the General Principles of Analysis, Part I.: The Analysis of Numerical Equations 1850
- An Introductory Treatise on Mensuration 1850
- An Introduction to Algebra and to the Solution of Numerical Equations 1851
- Rudimentary Treatise on Arithmetic 1858, 1882
- A Compendious Course of Mathematics 1855
- The Theory and Practice of Navigation and Nautical Astronomy 1856, 1882
- Navigation and Nautical Astronomy, 1858
- The Mosaic Cosmogony not “adverse to Modern Science 1861
- Science elucidative of Scripture and not antagonistic to it 1863
- Modern Scepticism Viewed in Relation to Modern Science 1865
