= Lloyds Bank plc v Independent Insurance Co Ltd =

- Court: Court of Appeal
- Full case name: Lloyds Bank plc v Independent Insurance Co Ltd
- Decided: 26 November 1998
- Citations: [2000] 1 QB 110 [1999] 2 WLR 986 [1998] EWCA Civ 1853

Court membership
- Judges sitting: Peter Gibson LJ; Thorpe LJ; Waller LJ

Keywords
- mistake, restitution, breach of mandate

Lloyds Bank plc v Independent Insurance Co Ltd [1998] EWCA Civ 1853 was a decision of the Court of Appeal relating to the recovery of a payment made by a bank on the mistaken belief that the customer had sufficient cleared funds in the account.

== Facts ==
Lloyds Bank were requested by their customer to make an electronic transfer of funds to the Independent Insurance Co Ltd. The bank mistakenly believed that a recent deposit into the customer's account had cleared, and on that basis made the requested transfer. In fact the relevant deposit had not cleared (and did not clear), and the bank accordingly sought to recover the payment from the payee on the basis that it was made under a mistake of fact.

== Judgment ==
Applying the decision of Robert Goff J in Barclays Bank Ltd v W J Simms, Son and Cooke (Southern) Ltd [1980] 1 QB 677 the Court of Appeal refused to order restitution of the sums paid. Because the payment was within the customer's mandate it was a duly authorised payment on behalf of the customer. Accordingly, the payment discharged the customer's debt to the insurance company, and thereby any claim for restitution was defeated by the fact that the payee had given good consideration (discharge of the debt). The Court of Appeal cited with approval the dictum of Robert Goff J in Barclays Bank v W J Simms:

The effect of the bank's payment is to accept the customer's request for overdraft facilities; the payment is therefore within the bank's mandate, with the result that not only is the bank entitled to have recourse to its customer, but the customer's obligation to the payee is discharged. It follows that the payee has given consideration for the payment.

Peter Gibson LJ held that the defendant could not be said to be unjustly enriched because it had given good legal consideration for the payment. Accordingly, there could be no restitution.

Waller LJ took a slightly different approach, indicating that there could be no order for restitution because the payee had a good defence of change of position in that it no longer had a remedy against the debtor. Thorpe LJ gave a slightly ambiguous judgment which was unclear as to whether he preferred the reasoning of Peter Gibson LJ or Waller LJ.

== Commentary ==
Goff & Jones, The Law of Restitution, treats the decision of Peter Gibson LJ as the better reasoning for the decision, and accepts that as authoritative for the proposition that providing good consideration for a payment will be a bar to unjust enrichment. Professor Charles Mitchell has also written approvingly of the decision, calling it a "straightforward application of Barclays v Simms".

The case is also treated as authoritative in Practical Law.
