= National Westminster Bank v Barclays Bank International Ltd =

UK legal case

National Westminster Bank Ltd v Barclays Bank International Ltd
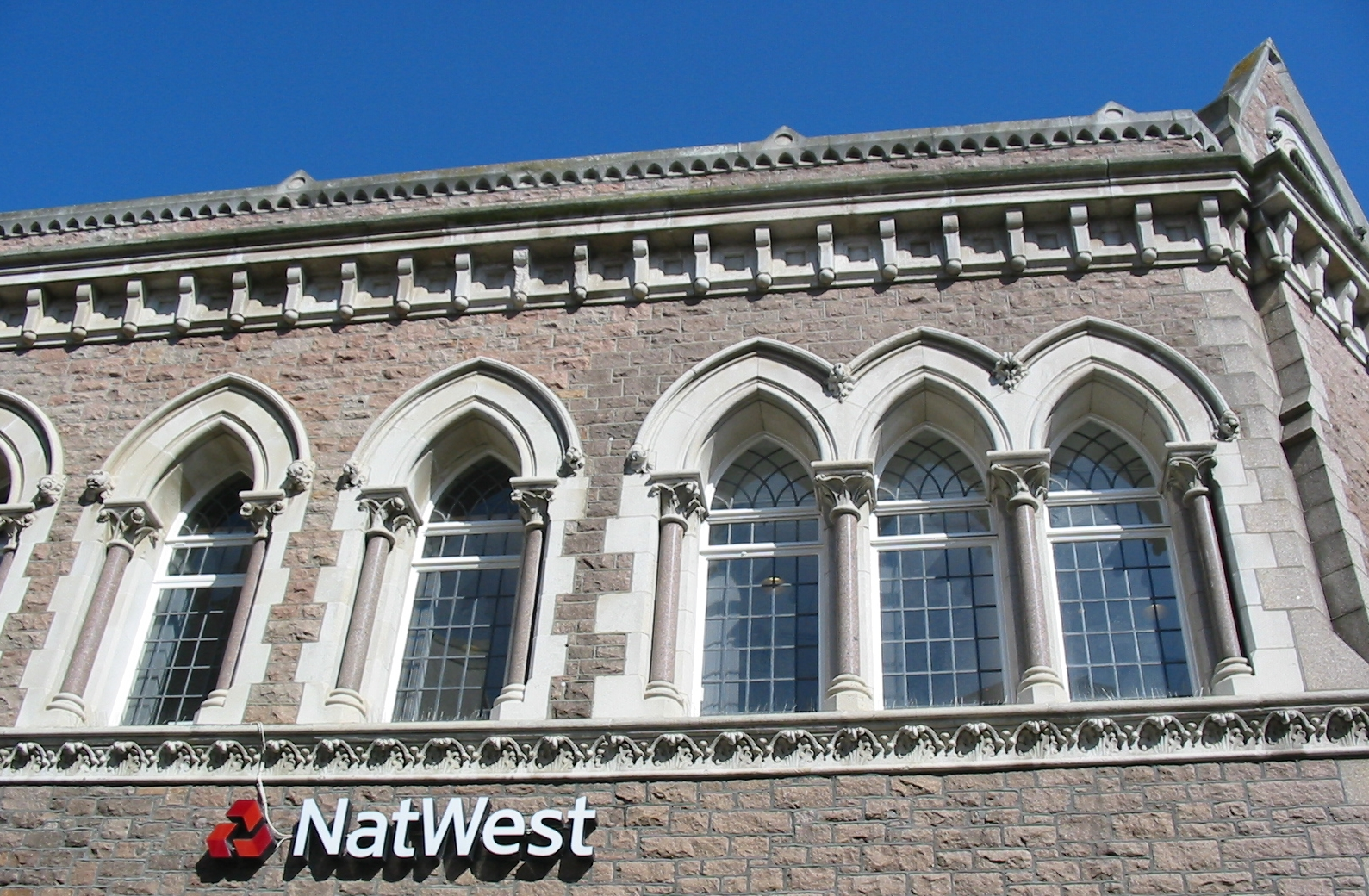
- Court: High Court
- Full case name: National Westminster Bank Ltd v Barclays Bank International Ltd and Another
- Decided: 17 June 1974
- Citation: [1975] 1 QB 654

Court membership
- Judge sitting: Kerr J

Keywords
- banking, duty of care, forged cheque

National Westminster Bank Ltd v Barclays Bank International Ltd [1975] 1 QB 654 (17 June 1974) is a decision of the High Court relating to the duty of care of a bank in relation to forged cheques with respect to persons other than their customer.

The court held that (1) a bank does not owe any duty of care to the payee of a cheque, so that any loss suffered by the payee as a result of a cheque being incorrectly honoured was not recoverable; and (2) by honouring a forged cheque the bank did not represent that the cheque was valid, and in the absence of any negligence, no estoppel could arise against the bank.

== Facts ==
An unknown rogue stole a blank cheque in Nigeria from one Commander Robert Bill, who was a retired naval office living in Lagos, and a customer of National Westminster Bank. The rogue (or an accomplice) then met the second defendant, a Mr Ismail. At the relevant time Nigeria operated foreign exchange controls. The official rate pegged the Nigerian pound to the British pound at 1:1, but a black market had grown up whereby people would exchange currency unofficially at around a 30% premium to the official rate. Mr Ismael wished to get money out of Nigeria, and the rogue claimed to be able to broker a black market trade. Mr Ismael agreed that he would accept a cheque for £8,000 in London and if it cleared, he would then write a cheque to the rogue's order drawn on his bank in Nigeria at the black market rate.

Mr Ismael then deposited the cheque with his bankers, Barclays Bank, who were the second defendants, and asked that the cheque be presented for special collection. National Westminster Bank honoured the cheque, being unaware at the time that it had been stolen and forged. Mr Ismael accordingly paid the rogue, who was never heard from again.

Once National Westminster Bank became aware of the true state of affairs they sued both Mr Ismael and his bankers, Barclays, for return of the sums. Barclays took no part in the proceedings but agreed to be bound by the court order, and Mr Ismael defended the claim. Mr Ismael based his defence on four alternative grounds: (1) that National Westminster Bank had been negligent in failing to spot that the cheque was forged when presented; (2) that the bank had represented that the cheque was good (by paying it) and he had acted to his detriment (by paying the rogue) and so the bank were estopped from subsequently denying the validity of the cheque; (3) that Mr Ismael had changed his position in reliance upon the cheque being paid, and so it would be inequitable to order repayment; and (4) that the bank's negligence should estop them from being entitled to recovery.

== Judgment ==
The case came before Kerr J.

=== Negligence ===
He first dealt with the allegation of negligence on the part of the paying bank. He noted that the bank had 5,000 customers and 7,000 accounts, and cleared hundreds of items daily. The key allegations of negligence were (i) the signature was forged, and the bank had a legal obligation to know this, (ii) the handwriting for the amounts and dates differed, and (iii) the amount was uncharacteristically large for this customer. The judge dismissed all of these points. Although an individual customer will rarely write a large cheques, banks will often see a customer who writes a large cheque for the first time. Cheques are often signed and then passed to another person to complete. And the saying "a bank must know its customer's signature" is misleading. A bank is not entitled to debit its customer's account if the customer has not in fact signed the cheque because there is no mandate, but that is not the same as saying that the bank owes a duty to other parties to recognise a customer's signature.

Furthermore, the judge held that the bank did not even owe a duty of care to a payee, and so even if it had been negligent, could not be liable on this basis.

=== Illegality ===
The judge noted that Mr Ismael was part of the Lebanese community which was fleeing Nigeria at the time due to instability. He noted that Mr Ismael saw nothing dishonest in his actions of seeking to evade currency restrictions, and the judge indicated "I am satisfied that in his own mind he was at all times acting honestly." Mr Ismael tried to recover the sums from the rogue in Nigeria but was unable to do so, and counsel for the bank disclaimed any reliance that Mr Ismael's conduct was unlawful. Although it is not expressly stated within the judgment, the court similarly does not refer to declining equitable relief to Mr Ismael on the basis that he did not have "clean hands".

=== Mistake of fact ===
Kerr J then reviewed the case law relating to recovery of payments for mistake of fact. The case preceded the ground-breaking decision of Robert Goff J in Barclays Bank Ltd v W J Simms, Son and Cooke (Southern) Ltd [1980] 1 QB 677 by some five years, and the judge engaged in a similar struggle, noting "the difficulty of extracting any clear principle from the prior authorities". In the end the judge seemed to form the view that the bank had a general right to recover the payment on the basis of mistake of fact.

=== Estoppel ===
After reviewing the earlier authorities, the judge held: "I do not think that he could in that event treat the payment of the cheque as an unequivocal representation that it was genuine."
