= Dextra Bank & Trust Co Ltd v Bank of Jamaica =

Dextra Bank & Trust Company Limited v Bank of Jamaica
- Court: Judicial Committee of the Privy Council
- Decided: 26 November 2001
- Citation: [2001] UKPC 50

Court membership
- Judges sitting: Lord Bingham of Cornhill; Lord Goff of Chieveley; Lord Hobhouse of Woodborough; Sir Martin Nourse; Sir Patrick Russell

Keywords
- Unjust enrichment, mistake

Dextra Bank & Trust Company Limited v Bank of Jamaica [2001] UKPC 50 (26 November 2001) is an important case in unjust enrichment in the Privy Council.

== Facts ==
Dextra drew a cheque for $2,999,000 from its bankers to lend to the Bank of Jamaica. Its agents told Dextra the money was for a loan. The Bank of Jamaica was told the money was for foreign currency purchased by its agents. They gave the money to the agents, but the agents were fraudsters. Dextra wanted restitution.

== Judgment ==
The Privy Council held that the claim failed, first because Dextra had made no relevant mistake of fact, and second because the Bank of Jamaica had changed its position. On the question of the change of position defence, Dextra argued that the Bank of Jamaica were relatively at fault, and therefore their defence should fail. Lord Bingham and Lord Goff said in the course of their advice,

28. Their Lordships turn to Dextra's claim to recover its money as having been paid to the BOJ under a mistake of fact. To succeed in an action to recover money on that ground, the plaintiff has to identify a payment by him to the defendant, a specific fact as to which the plaintiff was mistaken in making the payment, and a causal relationship between that mistake of fact and the payment of the money: see Barclays Bank Ltd v W J Simms, Son and Cooke (Southern) Ltd [1980] 1 QB 677, 694. In the opinion of their Lordships, there are difficulties with regard to the second and third of these elements in the present case.

29. Their Lordships turn then to the second element, viz. that Dextra must have paid the money to the BOJ under a mistake of fact. It is the contention of Dextra that the money was paid under a mistake, in that Dextra had intended to make a loan. The difficulty with this proposition is that this does not appear to have been a mistake as to a specific fact, like for example a mistake as to the identity of the defendant, but rather a misprediction as to the nature of the transaction which would come into existence when the Dextra cheque was delivered to the BOJ, which is a very different matter: see Birks, Introduction to the Law of Restitution, pp. 147-8. In that passage, Professor Birks explains the rationale of this distinction in terms relevant to the present case, as follows:

"The reason is that restitution for mistake rests on the fact that the plaintiff's judgment was vitiated in the matter of the transfer of wealth to the defendant. A mistake as to the future, a misprediction, does not show that the plaintiff's judgment was vitiated, only that as things turned out it was incorrectly exercised. A prediction is an exercise of judgment. To act on the basis of a prediction is to accept the risk of disappointment. If you then complain of having been mistaken you are merely asking to be relieved of a risk knowingly run … The safe course for one who does not want to bear the risk of disappointment which is inherent in predictions is to communicate with the recipient of the benefit in advance of finally committing it to him. He can then qualify his intent to give by imposing conditions, or sometimes by making a trust ..."

Here, unfortunately, Dextra failed to communicate directly with the BOJ to make sure that the BOJ understood that the money was being offered as a loan. Instead, it left the communication of this vital matter to its agent, Phillips. Dextra's misplaced reliance on Phillips led it to assume that a loan would result; and this prediction proved to be mistaken. But a misprediction does not, in their Lordships' opinion, provide the basis for a claim to recover money as having been paid under a mistake of fact.

30. Dextra did however argue that it suffered under a mistake of fact when it was deceived by Wildish into believing that the BOJ had previously agreed to take a loan from Dextra. In fact, the BOJ had not so agreed. But, although this can be regarded as a mistake of fact on the part of Dextra, it cannot be said to have caused Dextra's payment to the BOJ. This is because it was overtaken by the specific instructions given by Dextra to Phillips that the cheque was not to be handed over to the BOJ except against the delivery to him of a promissory note evidencing the loan and its terms. It was upon the compliance by Phillips with this instruction that Dextra relied to ensure that a loan was made upon the terms acceptable to it. The significance of the earlier deception by Wildish was only that it contributed to Dextra instructing Phillips to ensure that the cheque was handed over as a loan. Dextra's payment was not however caused by any such mistake of fact as that now alleged by Dextra; it was caused by a misprediction by Dextra that Phillips would carry out his instructions and that a loan would eventuate.

31. Their Lordships have however considered whether Dextra could recover its money as having been paid under a mistake of fact not at the time of delivery of the cheque to the BOJ, but at the time of payment of the cheque, on the basis that, if Dextra had known what had happened, it would have stopped payment of the cheque by its bank, the Royal Bank of Canada; but, since it did not know the true facts, it did not do so. Their Lordships have however been driven to the conclusion that there are insuperable objections to any such conclusion.

32. Beckford delivered the cheque to the BOJ which gave value for it in good faith and without notice of any want of authority on the part of Beckford or his associates. The BOJ then negotiated the cheque by endorsement and delivery to its bank, Citibank, for the purpose of collecting payment from the drawees, the Royal Bank of Canada. Citibank itself endorsed the cheque and presented it to the Royal Bank of Canada for payment. The Royal Bank of Canada paid the cheque and debited Dextra's account. The payment of the cheque was authorised by Dextra, and indeed the Royal Bank of Canada was under a duty to Dextra to honour the cheque, the payment of which discharged the liability of Dextra under the cheque. Furthermore the BOJ, having (in the opinion of their Lordships) acquired a good title to the cheque and having given value for it, would have succeeded if it had had to sue Dextra on the cheque. The same of course applies to Citibank, which was a holder in due course. In presenting the cheque for payment Citibank was asserting its own rights under the cheque and received payment on its own behalf.

33. It follows that Dextra cannot succeed against the BOJ on a claim for money had and received based upon what happened at the time of the payment of the cheque. It can only succeed, if at all, on the basis of the circumstances in which the BOJ acquired the cheque; and these disclose not a relevant mistake of fact but a misprediction.

[...]

45. ...it has been well settled for over 150 years that the plaintiff may recover “however careless [he] may have been, in omitting to use due diligence”: see Kelly v Solari (1841) 9 M & W 54 at p. 59, per Parke B. It seems very strange that, in such circumstances, the defendant should find his conduct examined to ascertain whether he had been negligent, and still more so that the plaintiff's conduct should likewise be examined for the purposes of assessing the relative fault of the parties. Their Lordships find themselves to be in agreement with Professor Peter Birks who, in his article already cited on Change of Position and Surviving Enrichment at p. 41, rejected the adoption of the criterion of relative fault in forthright language. In particular he stated (citing Thomas v Houston Corbett & Co. [1969] NZLR 151) that the New Zealand courts have shown how hopelessly unstable the defence [of change of position] becomes when it is used to reflect relative fault. Certainly, in the case of Thomas, the reader has the impression of judges struggling manfully to control and to contain an alien concept.’ (at [45]

== Comment ==
The decision in Dextra has been broadly accepted by academic lawyers, although it has been pointed out that the difference between a "misprediction" and a "mistake of fact" is a very narrow one. In Papmichael v National Westminster Bank plc [2003] EWHC 164 the court held that where the claimant paid drachmas into an account under the mistaken belief that the drachmas would be converted into US dollars, that was a mistake of fact which could found a restitutionary claim.

== See also ==
- English unjust enrichment law
