= Pinewood Halt railway station =

Former railway station in Berkshire England

Coordinates: 51.4591°N 1.2673°W

Pinewood Halt
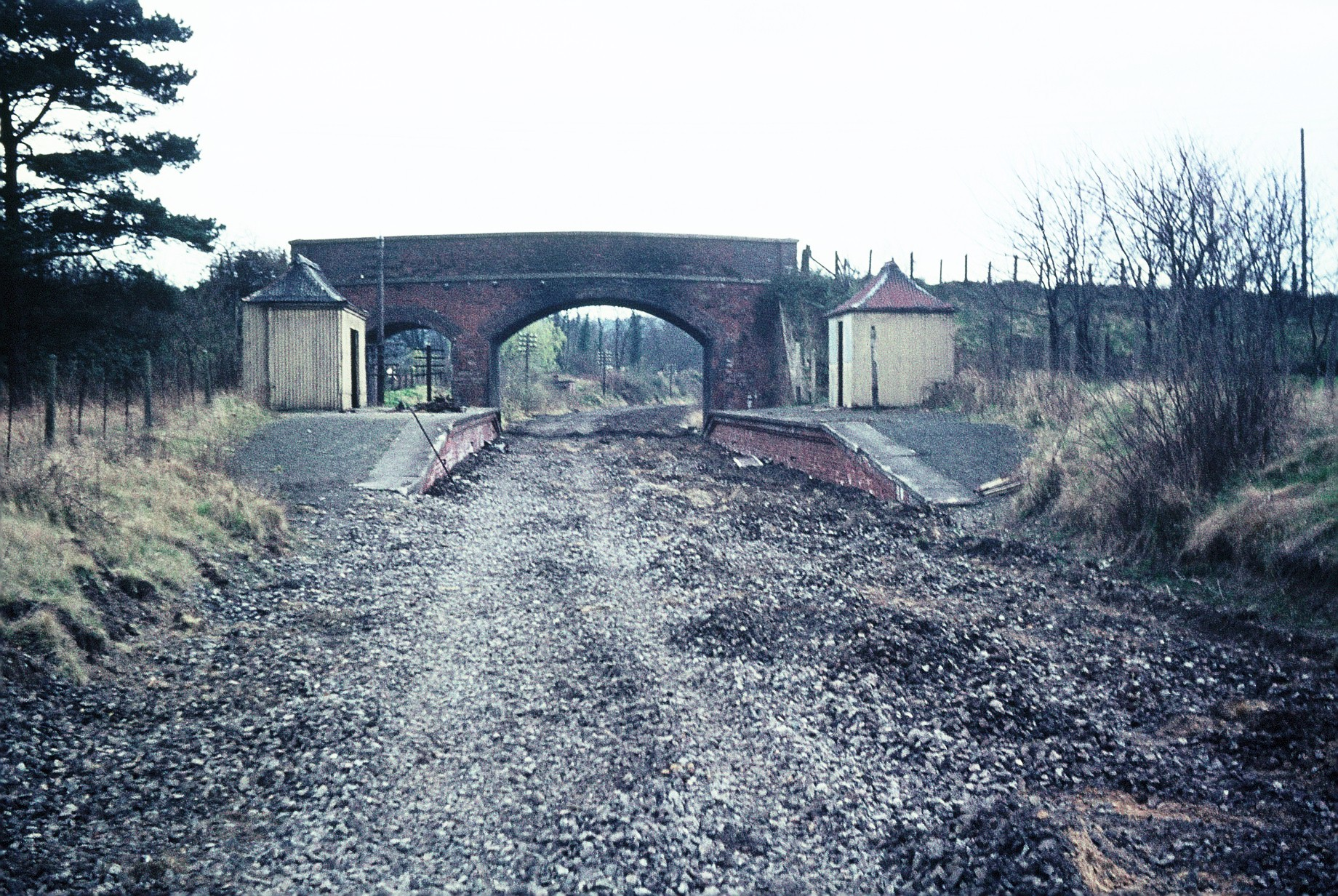
- The site of the station in 1967

General information
- Location: Hermitage, West Berkshire; England
- Grid reference: SU510736
- Platforms: 2

Other information
- Status: Disused

History
- Original company: Great Western Railway
- Post-grouping: Great Western Railway; Western Region of British Railways

Key dates
- 11 September 1933: Opened
- 4 August 1942: Closed
- 8 March 1943: Re-opened
- 10 September 1962: Closed
Location

Pinewood Halt railway station was a station on the Didcot, Newbury and Southampton Railway in England. It served the northern parts of Hermitage and Oare both in Berkshire. The halt was opened on 11 September 1933 in the hope of increasing passenger traffic. It closed in 1962.

== Facilities ==
There was a single platform and shelter but an additional platform, also with a shelter, was later built with the addition of a passing loop. The station itself had no goods facilities, but a couple of sidings were built to the north east of the station - accessed via the smaller arch in the picture - to serve the brickworks near the site.

== The site today ==
Evidence of the trackwork for the brickworks sidings can still be seen, although these had been built privately and they predated the halt.

== Services ==
Preceding station	Disused railways	Following station
Hampstead Norris	Great Western Railway; Didcot, Newbury and Southampton line	Hermitage
