= Société Nationale Industrielle Aérospatiale v Lee Kui Jak =

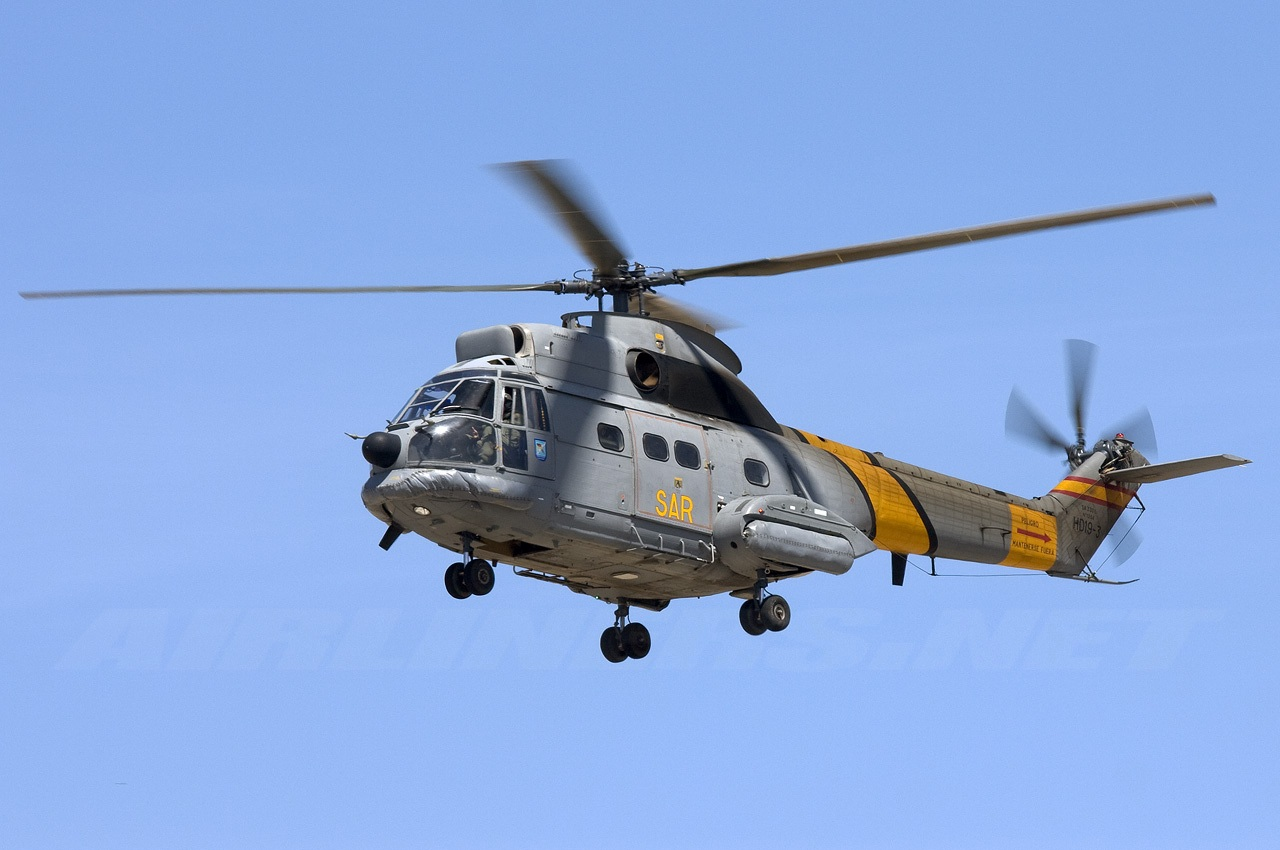
- Court: Privy Council
- Full case name: Société Nationale Industrielle Aérospatiale v (1) Lee Kui Jak (2) Yong Joon Kim and (3) Lee Kui Jak
- Decided: 14 May 1987
- Citations: [1987] UKPC 12 [1987] AC 871
- Transcript: BAILII

Court membership
- Judges sitting: Lord Keith of Kinkel; Lord Griffiths; Lord Mackay of Clashfern; Lord Goff of Chieveley; Sir John Megaw

Case opinions
- Lord Goff of Chievely

Keywords
- Anti-suit injunction; forum non conveniens

Société Nationale Industrielle Aérospatiale v Lee Kui Jak [1987] UKPC 12, [1987] AC 871 is a judicial decision of Privy Council on appeal from Brunei which was for many years, and arguably still is, the leading authority in relation to anti-suit injunctions under the English common law.

The case concerned a fatal helicopter crash which killed Yong Joon San, a wealthy business magnate, amongst others. Mr Yong's widow tried to sue various parties, including Société Nationale Industrielle Aérospatiale (SNIA) as manufacturer of the helicopter, in the courts of Texas under the Wrongful Death Statute in that state. SNIA asked the courts to restrain the claimants from proceedings in court by way of an anti-suit injunction. Their applications failed at first instance and on appeal, but succeeded in the Privy Council.

In handing down the judgment of the Privy Council, Lord Goff elaborated on the jurisdiction to grant anti-suit injunctions following his earlier decision in Spiliada Maritime Corp v Cansulex Ltd [1986] UKHL 10, [1987] AC 460, and set out the basic principles to be applied in relation to applications for such injunctions. He held that it was not enough that the foreign court was not the most appropriate forum - it was necessary to show that the foreign proceedings must be "vexatious or oppressive" for an injunction restraining them to be issued.

== Facts ==
On 16 December 1980 a Puma 330J helicopter crashed near Kuala Belait, Brunei killing all 12 people on board, including Yong Joon San. Mr Yong was a very successful businessman, and was estimated have a net worth of approximately US$20 million at his death, and the year before he died he had reportedly earned approximately US$1,800,000. An official inquiry was launched, which concluded that the case of the accident was "the initial cause of the accident was due to the mistaken health monitoring of the gearbox leading to a deterioration of the mechanical condition of the gearbox components."

Mr Yong's widow (Lee Kui Jak) and brother (Yong Joon Kim) brought proceedings for compensation. Upon the recommendation of their lawyers they brought the proceedings against a number of parties, including SNIA, in the courts of Texas. Their lawyer gave evidence to the effect that this was for two reasons: (1) stricter product liability laws, and (2) higher damages in Texas.

SNIA initially tried to have the action in Texas transferred to the Federal courts, and then sought to stay those proceedings on forum non conveniens grounds. Both applications were ultimately unsuccessful, and so they sought injunctions in the Brunei courts to restrain the claimants from pursuing the Texas proceedings.

== Decision ==
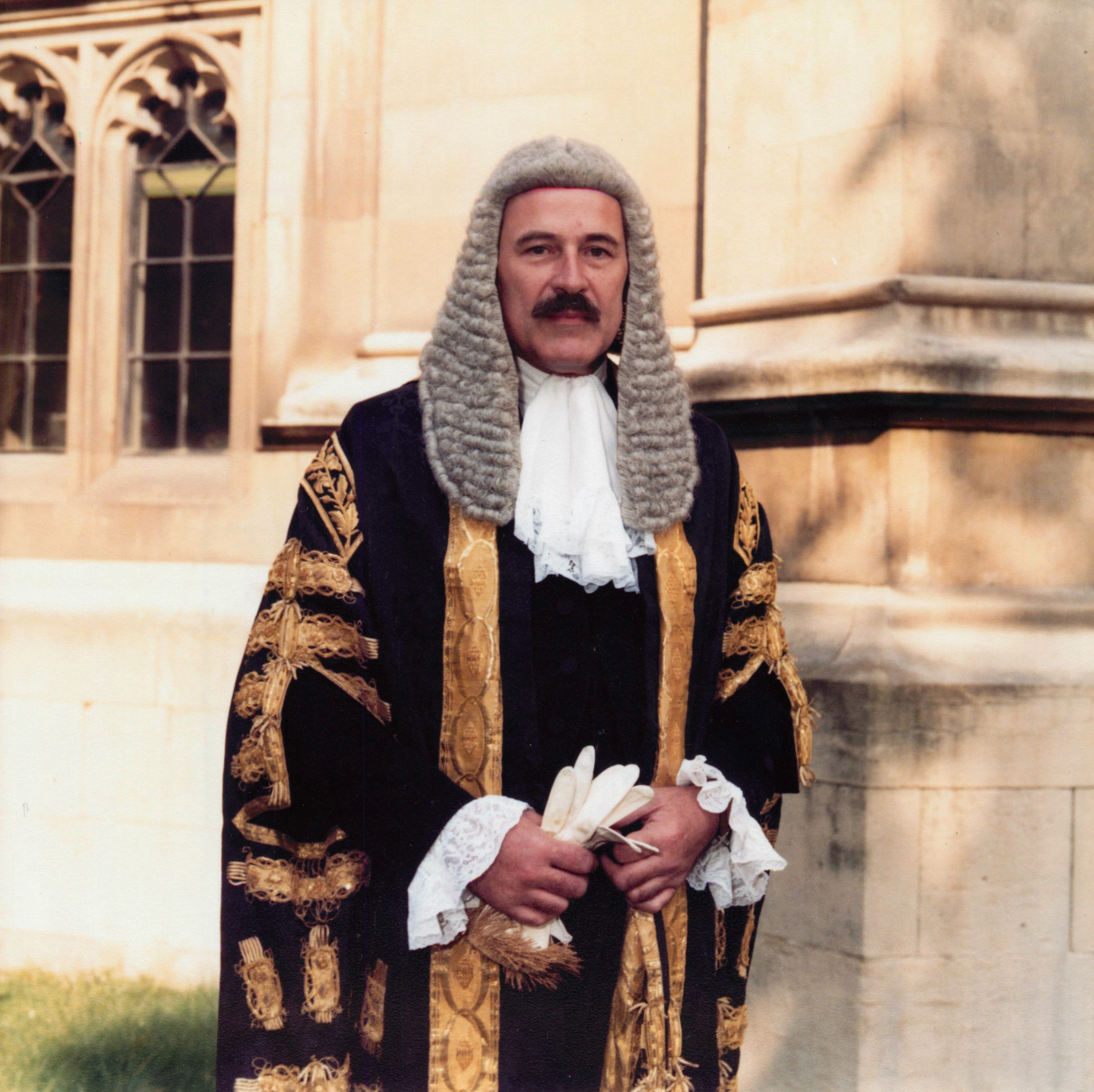
Lord Goff gave the advice of the Privy Council.

The application for an injunction failed at first instance and in the Brunei Court of Appeal. SNIA then appealed to the Privy Council. Lord Goff gave the advice of the Board.

=== Review of authorities ===
After reciting the facts and the history of the proceedings in Texas, he then reviewed the law in relation to anti-suit injunctions. He reviewed the speech of Lord Scarman in Castanho v Brown & Root (UK) Limited [1981] AC 557, and the speech of Lord Diplock in MacShannon v Rockware Glass Ltd [1978] AC 795. He referred in particular to the passage of Lord Scarman in Castanho:

Transposed into the context of the present case, this formulation means that to justify the grant of an injunction the defendants must show: (a) that the English court is a forum to hose jurisdiction they are amendable in which justice can be done at substantially less inconvenience and expense, and (b) the injunction must not deprive the plaintiff of a legitimate personal or juridical advantage which would be available to him if he invoked the [foreign] jurisdiction.

He then noted that the injunction operates against the litigants personally, not by way of interference with the foreign proceedings themselves. He cited with approval the statement of Sir John Leach VC in Bushby v Munday (1821) 5 Mad 297:

If a Defendant who was ordered by this Court to discontinue a proceeding which he has commenced against the Plaintiff, in some other Court of Justice, either in this country or abroad, thinks fit to disobey that order, and to prosecute such proceedings, this Court does not pretend to any interference with the other Courts; it acts upon the Defendant by punishment for his contempt in his disobedience to the order of the Court ...

Lord Goff then reviewed various other judicial decisions relating to anti-suit injunctions, including his own earlier decision in South Carolina Insurance Co v Assurantie Maatschappij "De Zeven Provincient" NV [1987] 1 AC 24, which he now indicated he disapproved. He then noted that earlier authorities had been "overtaken by events", and now needed to reconsidered in light of the Spiliada decision. He added that to obtain an injunction it was not sufficient to merely show that the foreign court was not the natural forum, although that would clearly be necessary. In addition it would be necessary to show that (a) being forced to contest the foreign proceedings would be vexatious or oppressive, and (b) that restraining the foreign proceedings would not deprive the other party of a legitimate advantage in those proceedings.

=== Cambridgeshire factor ===
The claimants argued that because the proceedings in Texas were so far advanced, they should constitute a Cambridgeshire factor as outlined in the Spiliada case. Lord Goff declined to accept that. In Cambridgeshire there was a related case that extremely complex and similar. In the instant case the Texan lawyers had pushed forward an ordinary trial. A party could not artificially create a Cambridgeshire type nexus with a proceeding simply by diligently and expeditiously pursuing procedural steps.

=== Vexatious or oppressive ===
Lord Goff noted that the claimants had given various undertakings (not to seek a jury trial in Texas, not to seek punitive damages, not to rely upon strict liability under Texas law) which negated much of what might otherwise be considered vexatious or oppressive to a defendant. However, the ability to claim a third-party contribution from one of their co-defendants, Bristow Malaysia, the operators of the fateful helicopter, had been compromised by a settlement agreement thereby exculpating them from further claims in Texas. Accordingly, SNIA would be unable to claim a contribution from the party who, according to the official accident report, was primarily responsible for the deaths of those on board. This, Lord Goff held, was sufficiently oppressive.

=== Legitimate advantage ===
Lord Goff then turned to consider whether restraining the proceedings would deprive the claimants of a legitimate advantage in the Texas courts. Having abandoned many of the plaintiff's advantages by undertaking they sought to argue that procedural mechanisms like wider pre-trial discovery were a legitimate advantage in the Texas courts. But the Privy Council were not persuaded.

== Authority ==
The case remains good law today. Lord Goff cited the case with approval in his subsequent decision on anti-suit injunctions in the House of Lords in Airbus Industrie GIE v Patel [1998] UKHL 12, [1999] 1 AC 119.

The case has been repeatedly cited as authority for its central proposition. In Trafigura Beheer BV v Kookmin Bank Co [2005] EWHC 2350 (Comm) the court amplified upon the Aérospatiale test, setting out several core propositions:

1. The court would grant an injunction where the pursuit of the foreign action was "unconscionable". The injunction is a personal remedy for the wrongful conduct of another party, in respect of conduct which is "vexatious" or "oppressive", but deriving from "the basic principle of justice".
2. The courts will readily grant an injunction to restrain proceedings brought in breach of an exclusive jurisdiction clause (save in circumstances where the Brussels Regime applies).
3. In the absence of an exclusive jurisdiction clause or some other special factor, a person does not enjoy a right not to be sued in a particular foreign court. Where proceedings are brought in a foreign court, the question of whether or not that forum is an appropriate forum is a factor in assessing the conduct of the party suing there.
4. Before granting any injunction the English court must have a sufficient legitimate interest in the foreign proceedings (this is a principle derived from Airbus Industrie GIE v Patel); if there is no contractual bar proceedings there, then there must be some putative proceedings in this jurisdiction which require protection.
5. English law attaches a high importance to international comity and the inevitable perception of the foreign court that an injunction amounts to interference in its proceedings, albeit indirectly. There must therefore be a clear need for protection of some English proceedings.
6. An injunction should not deprive a claimant of a legitimate advantage in any foreign proceedings which it would be unjust to deprive them of.
