= Barclays Bank Ltd v W J Simms, Son and Cooke (Southern) Ltd =

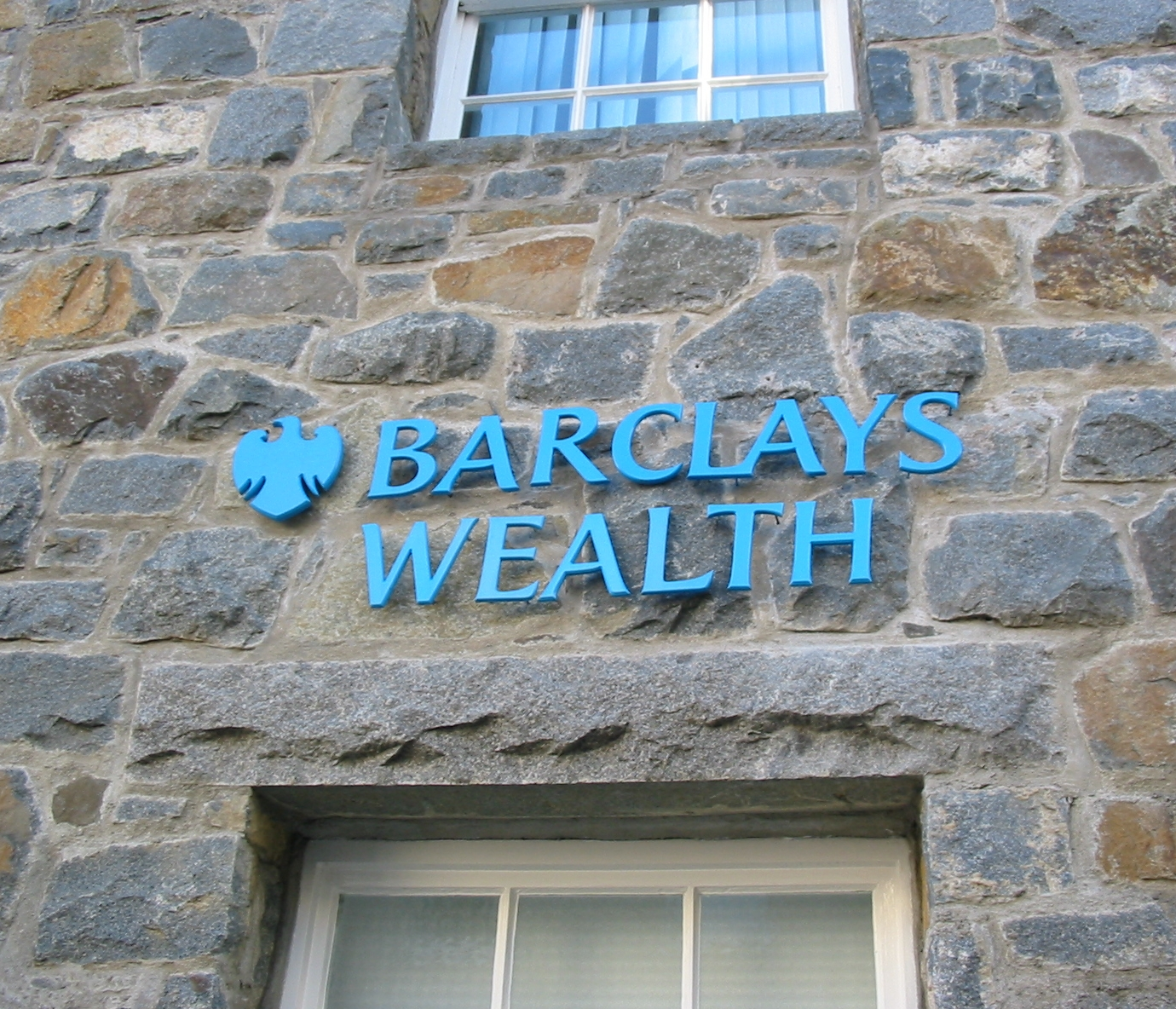
- Court: High Court
- Full case name: Barclays Bank Ltd v (1) W J Simms, Son and Cooke (Southern) Ltd and (2) William Sowman
- Decided: 24 April 1979
- Citations: [1980] 1 QB 677 [1979] 3 All ER 522

Court membership
- Judge sitting: Robert Goff J

Keywords
- mistake, restitution, breach of mandate

Barclays Bank Ltd v W J Simms, Son and Cooke (Southern) Ltd [1980] 1 QB 677, [1979] 3 All ER 522 was a decision of the High Court of Justice relating to the recovery of a payment mistakenly made by a bank after the customer had countermanded the cheque.

The decision is important not only for the specific point in issue, but it also was one of the earlier cases in relation to the modern development of the English law of restitution in relation to payments made under mistake of fact and the defence of change of position. One commentator has gone so far as to say: "the decision of Robert Goff J in Barclays Bank v Simms should be considered to be the Donoghue v Stevenson of restitution for mistake."

== Facts ==
The Royal British Legion Housing Association Ltd (called the "Association" in the judgment) was a customer of Barclays Bank. The Association had entered into a standard form building contract with W J Simms (called the "Company" in the judgment) for building works in the amount of just over £699,000. Separately the Company had obtained a bank loan from National Westminster Bank pursuant to which the Company had granted National Westminster Bank an all-assets floating charge.

On 12 September 1977 the Association issued a cheque for £24,000 to the Company upon completion of certain works as specified in the contract. However, on the next day - 13 September 1977 - National Westminster Bank appointed a receiver over the Company's assets and undertaking. Under clause 25 of the building contract the appointment of a receiver terminated the contract (albeit with an option to renew).

On the 15 September 1977 at 9.20am, after they had heard that the Company had gone into receivership, the Association contacted the bank and instructed the bank to put a stop on the cheque. Those instructions were confirmed in writing, and entered by Barclays Bank in its computer system. However, due to an error the payment was made. Once the bank discovered the error, they contacted the receiver and demanded repayment of the sum, but the receiver (Mr Sowman) refused. The bank accepted that it was not entitled to debit the account of the Association, and brought proceedings against the Company for the return of the monies which it had mistakenly paid out under the stopped cheque.

== Judgment ==
=== Mistake of fact ===
In a long and difficult judgment, Robert Goff J analysed and tried to rationalise a swathe of existing case law in relation to payments made under mistake of fact, starting with Kelly v Solari (1841) 9 M&W 54. After summarising the relevant cases, and noting which ones appeared to be inconsistent with House of Lords authority, the judge summarised the position as follows:

(1) If a person pays money to another under a mistake of fact which causes him to make the payment, he is prima facie entitled to recover it as money paid under a mistake of fact. (2) His claim may however fail if (a) the payer intends that the payee shall have the money at all events, whether the fact be true or false, or is deemed in law so to intend; or (b) the payment is made for good consideration, in particular if the money is paid to discharge and does discharge a debt owed to the payee (or a principal on whose behalf he is authorised to receive the payment) by the payer or by a third party by whom he is authorised to discharge the debt; or (c) the payee has changed his position in good faith or is deemed in law to have done so.

Robert Goff J stated that these principles were derived from the speeches in the three House of Lords cases which he had reviewed. Unusually, he also stated a number of propositions which had been previously enunciated in cases which he determined were not correct when considered against the line authorities as a whole.

He also noted that if the payment had been made by the bank under a contract then there could be no recovery unless the contract itself was void for mistake. However, in this case there was no contract between Barclays and W J Simms - only a putative mandate from their customer to pay money over.

=== Mandate ===
Robert Goff J noted that a bank which pays a cheque drawn or purportedly drawn by a customer without a mandate is paying without mandate, and cannot debit the customer's account. In such cases, the bank has paid out its own money. However, the bank is entitled to recover the mistaken payment unless the payee has changed his position in good faith. But if the payment had been within the customer's mandate (i.e. the mistake of fact had been related to something else entirely) there could be no recovery, as the payment would discharge the customer's debt to the payee.

=== Change of position ===
The judge then reviewed the various cases suggesting that where a payee has changed their position in good faith in reliance upon the payment, they should not be required to repay sums where it would be inequitable to do so. Noting a number of technical rules which had evolved in the judgments, Robert Goff J confined himself to saying "if, in due course, full recognition is given to the defence of change of position, there will be no further need for any such stringent rule and the law can be reformulated on a more rational and less technical basis."

=== Decision ===
Applying the facts to the case, the court held that (1) the mistake of the bank in overlooking the instruction to stop the cheque caused the payment; that (2) as the bank was acting without mandate, no obligation of the Association to the payee was discharged, and it follows from this that the payee gave no consideration to the bank for payment; (3) there was no evidence of any change of position by the recipient. Accordingly, the court ordered that the sums be repaid to the bank.

The judge stated "I must confess I am happy to be able to reach the conclusion that the money is recoverable by the plaintiff bank." There was a bona fide dispute between the Association and the Company as to whether the termination of the building contract terminated the right to the interim payment. Now that dispute could be litigated. Had the payment remained with the bank it would have been swallowed up by the creditors of the insolvent company leaving Barclays Bank to claim for a mere dividend in the bankruptcy, unjustly enriching the creditors of the insolvent Company.

== Commentary ==
The decision was not subject to an appeal, but it has been consistently applied since it was handed down and has not been subject to judicial criticism or doubted. It has been cited and applied frequently including by the House of Lords in Lipkin Gorman v Karpnale Ltd [1988] UKHL 12 (6 June 1991) and the Privy Council in Dextra Bank & Trust Company Limited v Bank of Jamaica [2002] UKPC 50 (26 November 2001).

The decision was also subject to limited academic criticism, including a strongly worded article by Professor Roy Goode in the Law Quarterly Review. Goode argued that the case was wrongly decided for three reasons: first, although the bank lacked express authority to pay on the cheque, it had implied authority; secondly, that the payee had changed their position and so should have had a good defence in law; and thirdly (although slightly speculatively) the better solution would be to treat the payment as discharging the debt of the customer and for the bank to be able to reclaim the sums from the customer under the doctrine of subrogation. Goode's criticisms of the decision have not been broadly accepted, either by commentators on the law of restitution, or on banking law.

== See also ==
- Lloyds Bank plc v Independent Insurance Co Ltd [2000] 1 QB 110
