= Das v Linden Mews Ltd =

Dass & Others v Linden Mews Ltd
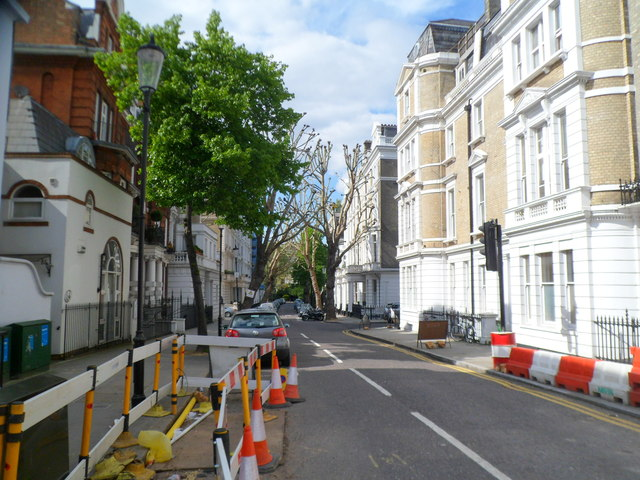
- The private residential road Linden Mews is off of this residential road
- Court: Court of Appeal
- Full case name: Peter Pharbu Dass and Others v Linden Mews Limited
- Decided: 1 May 2002
- Citation: [2002] EWCA Civ 590, [2003] 2 P&CR 4

Case history
- Prior action: Appellants lost at first instance.

Case opinions
- Buxton LJ: case to be remitted for a re-assessment of the award; damages may be more appropriate; principles for damages set out.
- Concurrence: Thorpe LJ; Moses J

Keywords
- Easements; parking land acquired; extension of right of way; private road company

Das v Linden Mews Ltd [2002] EWCA Civ 590 is an English land law case, concerning rights of way (a major type of easements).

== Facts ==
The company, Linden Mews Ltd, was formed by certain residents of Linden Mews in Notting Hill to buy the road, where in places the residents regularly historically parked on average one car per house which was all the space available. The exception was nos. 4 and 5 who owned a small garden as separate parcels of land (tenements) for parking beyond the end of the road since 1988 and in 1998 opened up part of the wall, affixing substantial gates to access it more easily. These two residents claimed an easement, and the company counterclaimed trespass seeking an injunction (and failing which an agreement to refrain from parking in the residents' yards at the end of the road in favour of their accepting its proposed levy of parking charges on the road it owned).

The company said/argued:

1. Anything more, for free, than disembarking and unloading in front of their properties was not acceptable to it.
2. Hypothetically it would allow free access into any garage in any of the houses own plots, were such to exist.
3. It would require the payment by the various owners of substantial sums for them to park on the [i.e. its] carriageway.
4. Access of the far two residents' individual plots/"parking spaces" via the road would break the general principle in Harris v Flower, reaffirmed in Alvis v Harrison (1991) against the implied enlargement of easements not for a change of use of land but rather for additional parcels of land.

The two households argued:

1. Their easement by prescription (passage of time) to access their homes extended to the plots they owned at the end of the road, which they had later acquired.

In the court below the judge in the Central London County Court found strongly for the private road company, granting them a restrictive injunction against Das and the other neighbour.

== Judgment ==
Buxton LJ gave the substantive judgment with which the fellow two judges agreed. He held there was no easement for parking, but the judge had been wrong to award an injunction, and should have considered whether damages in lieu would have been more appropriate, and how much. The case was remitted back to the trial judge for a fresh exercise of his discretion as to whether an injunction should be granted following the guidelines set down by the Court of Appeal.

The panel of three judges agreed a dominant owner (the residents) could only as of right use a right of way granted (or relying its period of exercise for obtaining it "by prescription") for the enjoyment and for the purposes of the dominant tenement. They could not use it for the additional land they acquired. The only automatically permissible enlargement of the dominant tenement would be an expansion of business, otherwise an express grant of easement would need to be negotiated, such as at a market price. This rule was upheld in Alvis v Harrison (1991) in the House of Lords, a Scottish case stated by the House equally to apply English law.

It may however be pertinent to draw attention to some aspects of this judgment that the judge may wish to have in mind when determining whether damages is the appropriate remedy, and if so in what amount.

1. The finding of trespass is based on the extension of the dominant tenement: see § 24 above. As this court made plain in Peacock v Custins [2001], that is entirely different from, and does not depend on any finding as to, excessively burdensome use of the way.
2. Use of the way gives access to, and unlocks, a valuable asset held by the owner, in the shape of a parking space: see § 23 above. That however benefits the owner, rather than necessarily placing a burden on Linden Mews Ltd, save in the sense referred to in sub-paragraph (i) above.
3. Linden Mews Ltd is not a frontager, and only its legal interests, as opposed to its amenity or convenience, are affected by the use of the way. This consideration may be thought relevant to the exercise of the judge’s discretion in relation both to delay and to any previous indication of willingness to accept a financial settlement.

== Cases followed and applied ==
- Harris v Flower (1904), CA; (1904) 74 LJ Ch 127 (1904)
- Alvis v Harrison (1991), UKHL (S); (1991) 62 P & CR 10
- Peacock v Custins [2001], CA; [2001] 1 EGLR 87; [2002] 1 WLR 1815; [2001] 2 All ER 827

== See also ==
- English land law
- English trusts law
- English property law
