= Hermitage railway station =

Former railway station in England

Coordinates: 51.4501°N 1.2747°W

Hermitage
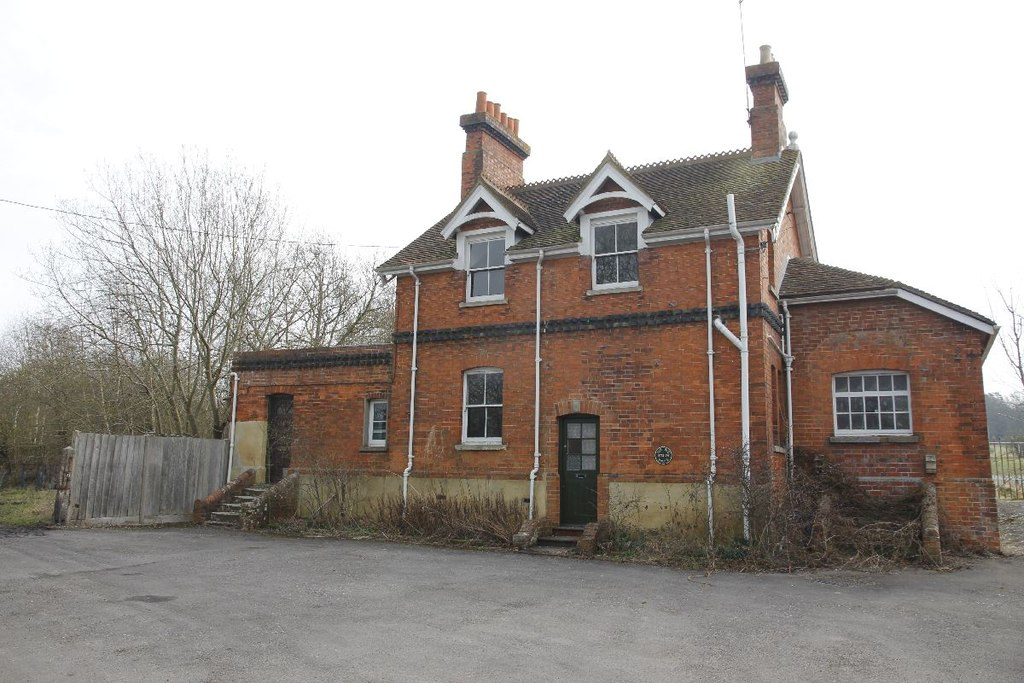
- The station building in 2012

General information
- Location: Hermitage, West Berkshire; England
- Grid reference: SU505726
- Platforms: 2

Other information
- Status: Disused

History
- Original company: Didcot, Newbury and Southampton Railway
- Pre-grouping: Didcot, Newbury and Southampton Railway
- Post-grouping: Great Western Railway; Western Region of British Railways

Key dates
- 13 April 1882: Opened
- 4 August 1942: Closed
- 8 March 1943: Re-opened
- 10 September 1962: Closed
Location

Hermitage railway station was a railway station on the Didcot, Newbury and Southampton Railway which served the villages of Hermitage and Oare in Berkshire. The station closed in 1962. The station house remains and is occupied by a scaffolding company. The adjacent site became a light industrial site and was occupied by the Arena Seating Company. The Arena Seating site was subsequently re-developed for housing in 2006–07. The residential development is named Hermitage Green.

== Facilities ==
Hermitage station was built with two platforms including a passing loop with the ticket office and station buildings located on the northbound platform. A goods shed and crane were located next to two sidings south of the station. In 1942, several sidings were built further to the south of the station to provide access to a cold store.

== The site today ==
The adjoining bridge over the road serving the village was completely removed in 1979. The station building is used as a private dwelling. There are still platforms in existence behind the station building. The 1942 sidings and cold store have been demolished and the site turned into an area of housing.

== Services ==
Preceding station	Disused railways	Following station
Pinewood Halt; Line and station closed	Great Western Railway; Didcot, Newbury and Southampton Railway	Newbury; Line closed, station open
