= No case to answer =

Legal motion which seeks acquittal because the prosecutor's case is insufficient

No case for the defendant to answer (sometimes shortened to no case to answer) is a term in the criminal law of some Commonwealth states, whereby a defendant seeks acquittal without having to present a defence, because of the insufficiency of the prosecution's case. The motion is infrequently used in civil cases where the defendant asserts that the plaintiff's case is insufficient to prove liability. (Note: For a rare example, see the submission of Lloyds Bank in the matter of Lipkin Gorman v Karpnale Ltd [1987] 1 WLR 987.)

At the close of the prosecution's case during a criminal trial, the defendant may make a motion that there is no case for the defendant to answer (similar to a motion for a directed verdict in a United States court). If the judge agrees, then the matter is dismissed and the defendant is acquitted without having to present any evidence in their defence. If the judge does not accept the submission, the case continues and the defence must present their case.

Because a judge's refusal to uphold such a submission may potentially bias a jury's decision, a submission of no case to answer is usually heard in the absence of the jury.

== England and Wales ==
=== General test ===
The general approach to be followed was described by Lord Lane CJ:

- (1) If there is no evidence that the crime alleged has been committed by the defendant, there is no difficulty. The judge will of course stop the case.
- (2) The difficulty arises where there is some evidence but it is of a tenuous character, for example because of inherent weakness or vagueness or because it is inconsistent with other evidence.
  - (a) Where the judge comes to the conclusion that the prosecution evidence, taken at its highest, is such that a jury properly directed could not properly convict upon it, it is the judge's duty, upon a submission being made, to stop the case.
  - (b) Where however the prosecution evidence is such that its strength or weakness depends on the view to be taken of a witness's reliability or other matters which are generally speaking within the province of the jury and where on one possible view of the facts there is evidence upon which a jury could properly come to the conclusion that the defendant is guilty, then the judge should allow the matter to be tried by the jury. ...

There will of course, as always in this branch of the law, be borderline cases. They can safely be left to the discretion of the judge.

— R v Galbraith (1981)

In a trial in the Crown Court, a submission by counsel that there is no case to answer is heard in the absence of the jury. A submission may be made at the close of the prosecution case or at a later stage.

=== Application in identification cases ===
When, in the judgment of the trial judge, the quality of the identifying evidence is poor, as for example when it depends solely on a fleeting glimpse or on a longer observation made in difficult conditions (for example, in bad weather, poor lighting or in a fast moving vehicle), the judge should withdraw the case from the jury and direct an acquittal unless there is other evidence which goes to support the correctness of the identification.

=== Application in confession cases ===
See MacKenzie (1992) 96 Cr App R 98.

=== Application where it is not clear which crime has been committed ===
Where it is clear that an accused has committed an offence but it is impossible to say which offence was committed, neither crime can be left to the jury.

Similarly, where it is possible to say that one defendant definitely committed a crime, but it is not possible to say which defendant, both must be acquitted unless, following the evidence, they could properly both be convicted under the doctrine of joint enterprise.

=== Application where part of the evidence is silence ===
There may be no conviction based wholly on silence and the judge must withdraw a case from the jury if the only evidence tendered by the prosecution is the defendant's silence in interview.

== Malaysia ==
In the Malaysian Syariah Court (a sharia civil court), after the plaintiff has offered their evidence, the defendant may make a submission to the court that there is no case to answer.

== Scotland ==
The procedure is governed by section 97 of the Criminal Procedure (Scotland) Act 1995, which states that:

(1) Immediately after the close of the evidence for the prosecution, the accused may intimate to the court his desire to make a submission that he has no case to answer both—

(a) on an offence charged in the indictment; and
(b) on any other offence of which he could be convicted under the indictment.

(2) If, after hearing both parties, the judge is satisfied that the evidence led by the prosecution is insufficient in law to justify the accused being convicted of the offence charged in respect of which the submission has been made or of such other offence as is mentioned, in relation to that offence, in paragraph (b) of subsection (1) above, he shall acquit him of the offence charged in respect of which the submission has been made and the trial shall proceed only in respect of any other offence charged in the indictment.

(3) If, after hearing both parties, the judge is not satisfied as is mentioned in subsection (2) above, he shall reject the submission and the trial shall proceed, with the accused entitled to give evidence and call witnesses, as if such submission had not been made.

(4) A submission under subsection (1) above shall be heard by the judge in the absence of the jury.

== Sri Lanka ==
In a criminal trial, the prosecution has to prove the case against the accused beyond the reasonable doubt. According to the section 200(1) of the Code of Criminal Procedure, when there is no evidence to prove the case levelled against the accused, then the court has to record a verdict of acquittal without calling accused's defence.

In the case The Attorney-General v. Baranage (2003) 1 Sri.L.R 340 has explained whether on what stage the court is entitled to make an order in accordance with aforesaid section. In this case The Court of Appeal of Sri Lanka has stated that "if no reasonable person can place any reliance on such evidence, then it is a situation where there is no evidence."

== See also ==
- Directed verdict
- Judgment as a matter of law
