= Chieveley =

Coordinates: 51°27′40″N 1°19′08″W

- Village and civil parish
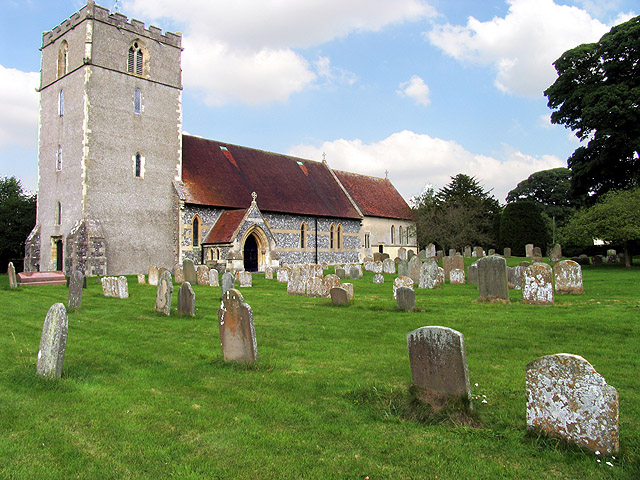
- St Mary's Church

- Location within Berkshire
- Area: 20.86 km^{2} (8.05 sq mi)
- Population: 2,890 (2011 census)
  - Density: 139/km^{2} (360/sq mi)
- OS grid reference: SU474738
- Civil parish: Chieveley
- Unitary authority: West Berkshire
- Ceremonial county: Berkshire
- Region: South East
- Country: England
- Sovereign state: United Kingdom
- Post town: Newbury
- Postcode district: RG20
- Dialling code: 01635
- Police: Thames Valley
- Fire: Royal Berkshire
- Ambulance: South Central
- UK Parliament: Newbury
- Website: MyChieveley.co.uk

Chieveley /ˈtʃiːvli/ is a village and large civil parish centred 3.5 miles (5.6 km) north of Newbury in Berkshire, close to the M4 motorway and A34 road. Chieveley services are within the parish.

== Geography ==
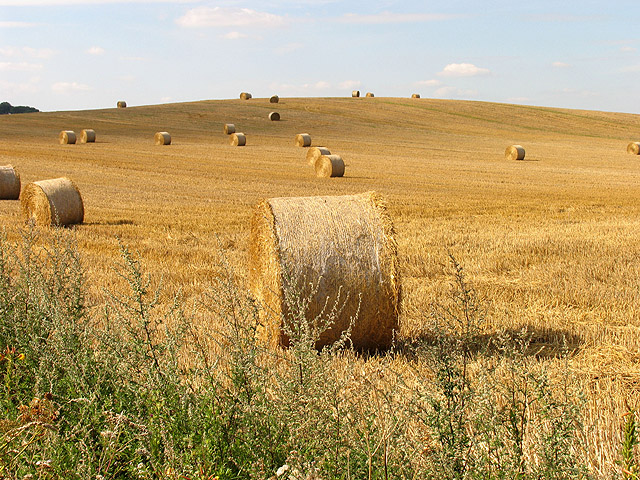
Harvested hay meadow on Grange Farm, Chieveley

A map of 1877 gave the area as 5,328 acres (21.56 km^{2}). The landscape is of gently rolling chalk hills. The land is predominantly arable with some dairy, sheep and pigs. There is a healthy quantity of woodland and abundant wildlife. There is a network of green lanes and footpaths that afford good walking. The northern end of Chieveley village is known as Downend. As well as Chieveley, the civil parish also consists of the village of Curridge and the hamlets of Oare and Snelsmore Common. The original parish also included Leckhampstead and Winterbourne as well.

The structure has been much affected by roads. The M4 motorway, opened in 1971, passes east–west through the middle of the parish and has done much to cut Curridge and Oare off from Chieveley. The A34, a major trunk road, running north–south, quarters the parish. Its path has moved several times, the most recent development being a change to Junction 13 that opened in Autumn 2004. Chieveley services is at junction 13 of the M4, where these two roads meet. The landscape is dominated by farming. There are currently three working farms in the parish. Other industries include a garden centre, land-fill site, hotels, a baker and some small businesses.

== History ==
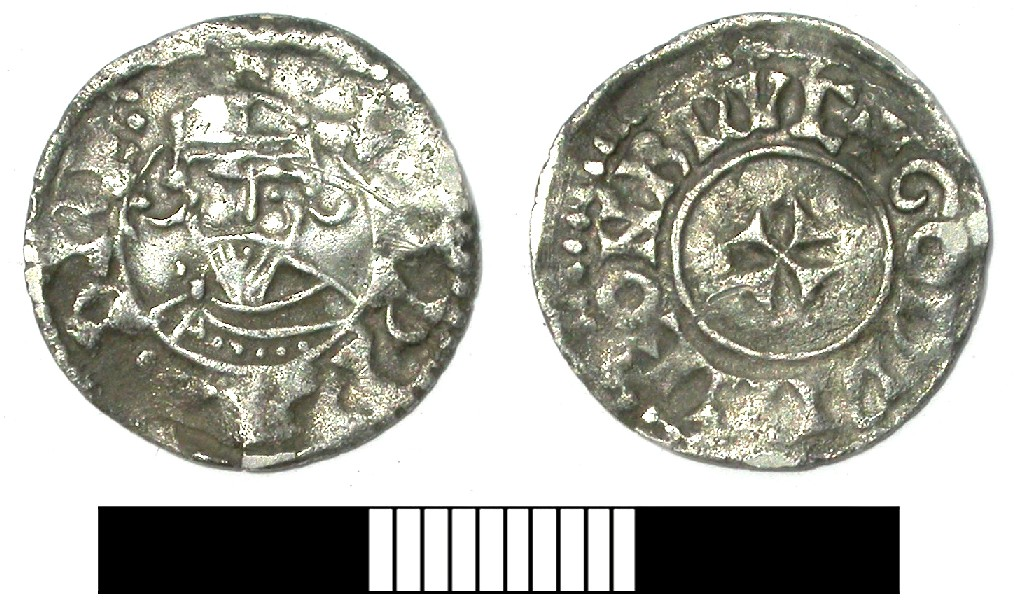
A silver penny of Edward the Confessor, found in Chieveley in 2010 and dated to c. 1062 – c. 1065

There is archeological evidence that indicates early settlement in the area. The parish has an Iron Age hillfort in Snelsmore, called Bussock Camp. This is in private grounds, but is visible in May when they are opened to the public to view the bluebells. The name Chieveley is said to be derived from "Field of Chives". The Women's Institute's Berkshire Book assures the reader that chives were noted in the area as far back as 951. This is the same year that King Eadred gave the village to his bailiff, Wulf. The Domesday Book of 1086 says this of Chieveley:

In Rowbury Hundred The abbey itself holds Chieveley. It has always held it. TRE (in the reign of Edward the Confessor) it was assessed at 27 hides; now at 7½ hides with land for 20 ploughs. In demesne are 3 ploughs; and 28 villains and 10 bordars with 18 ploughs. There are 3 slaves, and 4 acres (16,000 m^{2}) of meadow, [and] woodland for 60 pigs. Of this land William holds of the abbot 5 hides, and Godfrey 1½ hides, and there is 1 plough, with 3 villains and 2 bordars having 1 plough, and 3 acres (12,000 m^{2}) of meadow. The whole, TRE and afterwards, was worth 12l; now the abbot's portion is worth 10l; that of his men 50s. shillings

This text is a structured shorthand tax assessment and identifies 39 men, many of whom would have had their own households, and three serfs, a form of slavery done away with early in the feudal system, generally in the era of Magna Carta. In August 1207, King John seems to have had a good few days' hunting in West Berkshire. He is reported in Curridge on the 3rd and Chieveley on the 5th. Chieveley once had its own maypole, on the site now occupied by Maypole Cottage (on the corner of the High Street and Church Lane).

=== St Mary's Church ===
It is likely that there was a Saxon church before it was replaced by the Normans. The present church is a Grade II* listed building and visible parts date from the 13th century. The chancel and lower stage of the bell tower date from then with the upper part of the tower from the following century. The 15th century saw the insertion of a window in the south-west of the chancel and the font is of this period. The church was heavily restored in the 19th century including rendering and buttresses outside. Chieveley parish registers start on 10 April 1560. There are still several families in the area who were recorded in those annals. The first vicar of Chieveley was Elias, appointed in 1154.

The church is equipped with eight bells (tenor 11 long cwt 0 qr 3 lb (1,235 lb or 560 kg) in F) hung for English style change ringing. Two of the bells pre-date the Commonwealth period, the number 6 (7 long cwt 0 qr 24 lb (808 lb or 367 kg) in A) of 1584 (founder Joseph Carter) and the number 4 (5 long cwt 1 qr 21 lb (609 lb or 276 kg) in C) of 1633 (founder Ellis I Knight). In addition there is a Sanctus bell.

== Transport ==
Chieveley is served by bus services 6, 6A and 107 from Newbury.

== Demography ==
2011 Published Statistics: Population, home ownership and extracts from Physical Environment, surveyed in 2005
Output area	Homes owned outright	Owned with a loan	Socially rented	Privately rented	Other	km^{2} roads	km^{2} water	km^{2} domestic gardens	Usual residents	km^{2}
Civil parish	341	326	53	189	21	0.594	0.019	0.783	2890	20.86

== Notable residents ==
- Robert Goff, Baron Goff of Chieveley (1926–2016), Senior Law Lord (1996–1998), Lord of Appeal in Ordinary (1986–1998), who lived in Chieveley House
- The mother of Lord Chief Justice Holt.
