= Grimsbury Castle =

Hillfort in Berkshire, England

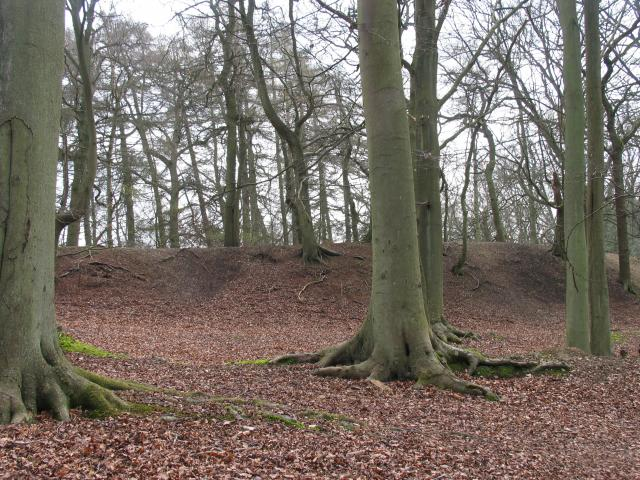
- View of the eastern side

- Location within Berkshire

General information
- Architectural style: Iron Age Hill Fort
- Location: Hermitage, Berkshire, England
- Coordinates: 51.4473°N 1.2660°W
- Elevation: 155 metres (509 ft)

Technical details
- Size: 3.2 hectares (7.9 acres)

Scheduled monument
- Official name: Grimsbury Castle
- Designated: 24 October 1968
- Reference no.: 1006983

Grimsbury Castle is an Iron Age "multiple enclosure" Hill Fort comprising a large circular encampment on a high hill. It is within Grimsbury Wood, between Cold Ash and Hermitage, in the county of Berkshire.

== History ==
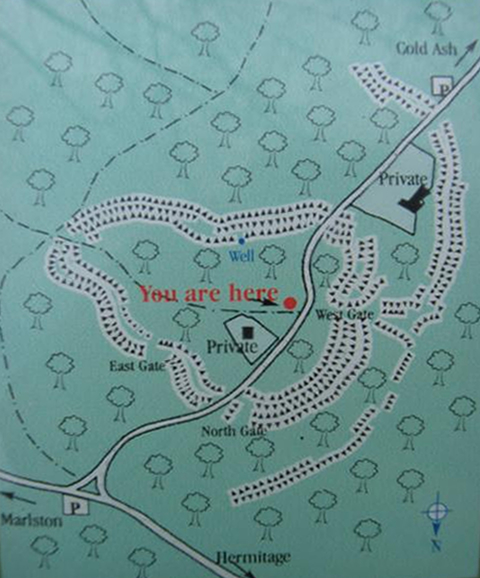
Plan of Grimsbury Castle

The site benefits from a natural spring which reportedly has never been known to run dry. The entrenchment would appear to have been extended on the south side of the hill for the purpose of enclosing this spring. This rampart appears to have had only two entrances, one on the north and the other on the south side; just within the entrenchment, at the entrance on the north, is a small tumulus, which may have been constructed as a mount for observation or defense, or for the purpose of interment.

The name shows that the later Saxon settlers in the region found the earthworks so impressive that they thought they must have been built by the chief of their gods, Woden alias Grim.

The site lies at an elevation of 155m AOD. There is an 18th-century folly on the site, also known as Grimsbury Castle.

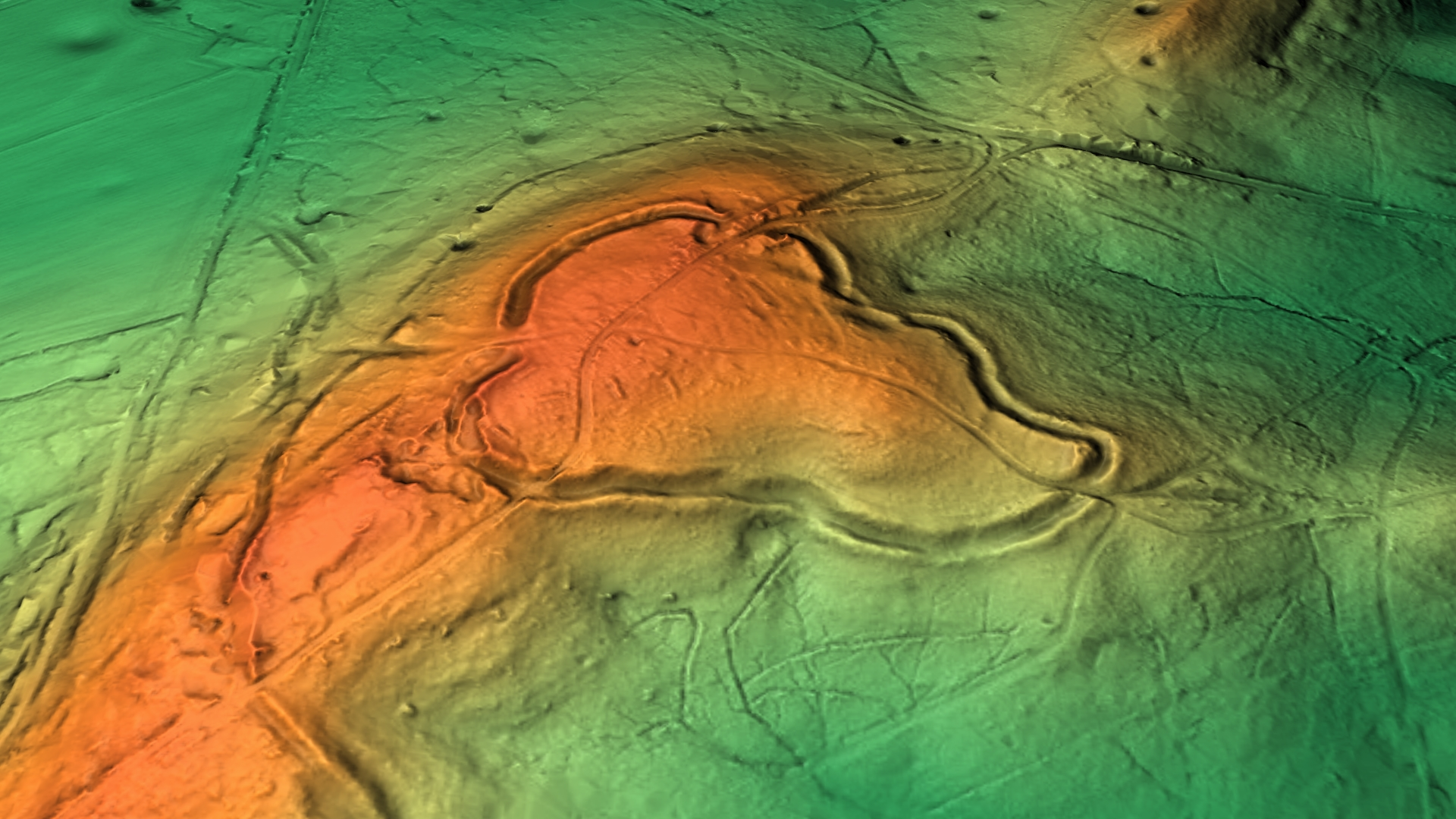
3D view of the digital terrain model

Today the site is crossed by a small, single-track roadway. It is a designated scheduled monument.
