= Chieveley House =

House in Chieveley, Berkshire, England

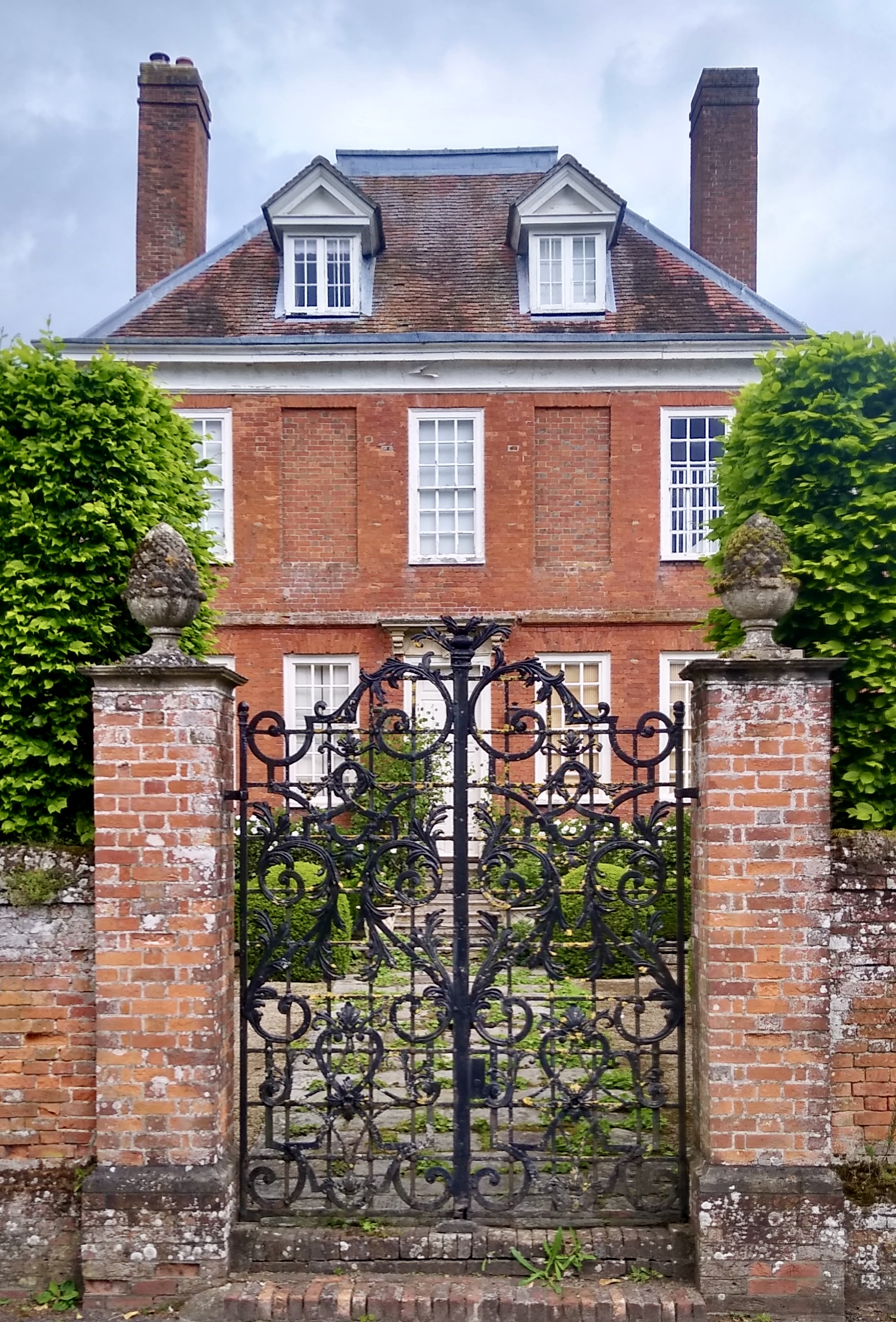
- Chieveley House

- Location within Berkshire

General information
- Type: Country house
- Architectural style: Queen Anne
- Location: Chieveley, Berkshire, England
- Coordinates: 51.4628°N 1.3163°W
- Year built: 1716
- Renovated: 1883

Listed Building – Grade II*
- Official name: Chieveley House
- Designated: 6 April 1967
- Reference no.: 1291142

Chieveley House, on the High Street in the village of Chieveley, Berkshire, England, is a Grade II* listed country house dating from the early 18th century. It has had a number of notable owners including Valentine Wyndham-Quin, son of Windham Wyndham-Quin, the Baroness Howard de Walden and Lord Goff of Chieveley.

== History and description ==
The house was built around 1716, identifiable by dates on the rainwater heads. Pevsner records Chieveley as one of a range of "grand houses [set] behind high brick walls" on the village's High Street. At the time of its construction the occupants are recorded as a gentleman, his four children, and six servants. In the 20th century, the house was occupied by Valentine Wyndham-Quin, son of Windham Wyndham-Quin and subsequently the Baroness Howard de Walden. In 1976 Chieveley was bought by Lord Goff of Chieveley, who took the name of the village when made a Lord of Appeal in Ordinary and a life peer in 1986.

Pevsner describes Chieveley as a "compact hipped roofed dolls' house of red brick". The architectural style is Queen Anne.

In 2016 the owners created a garden to the designs of Arne Maynard. In 2018 Chieveley House was put up for sale with Knight Frank for £3.5 million.

== See also ==
- Grade II* listed buildings in Berkshire

== Sources ==
- Tyack, Geoffrey; Bradley, Simon; Pevsner, Nikolaus (2010). Berkshire. The Buildings Of England. New Haven, US and London: Yale University Press. ISBN 978-0-300-12662-4.
