= Bussock Camp =

Hillfort in Berkshire, England

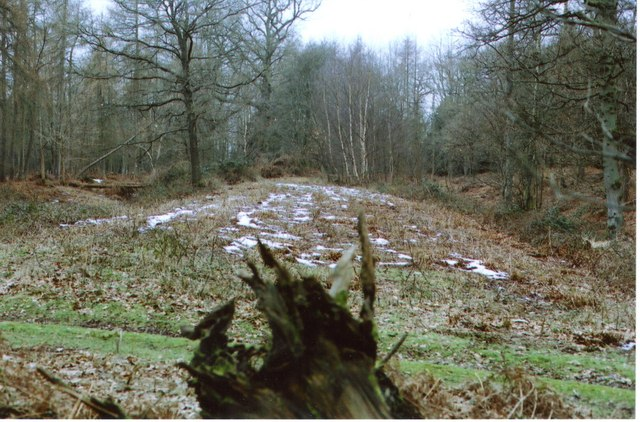
- Bussock Camp, viewed through the entrance to the north of the fort

- Location within Berkshire
- 51.4505°N 1.3279°W
- Periods: Iron Age
- Location: Berkshire

Site notes
- Public access: Private Land

Scheduled monument
- Official name: Bussock camp
- Reference no.: 1006984

Bussock Camp is the site of an Iron Age bivallate hillfort located in Berkshire, England. It has a double bank and ditch to the south and east, with only a single bank remaining the north and western sides. The entrance is to the north of the site and is believed to be original, and the site encloses approximately 11 acres.

The site lies within a private estate on Phillip's Hill, and within Bussock Wood. There are various lanes and paths running through the wood, however none of them appear as public rights of way. There is a public bridle path that runs east to west, slightly to the south of the site. Apparently the site is accessible in May, when the woods are opened to the public to view the fine display of bluebells.

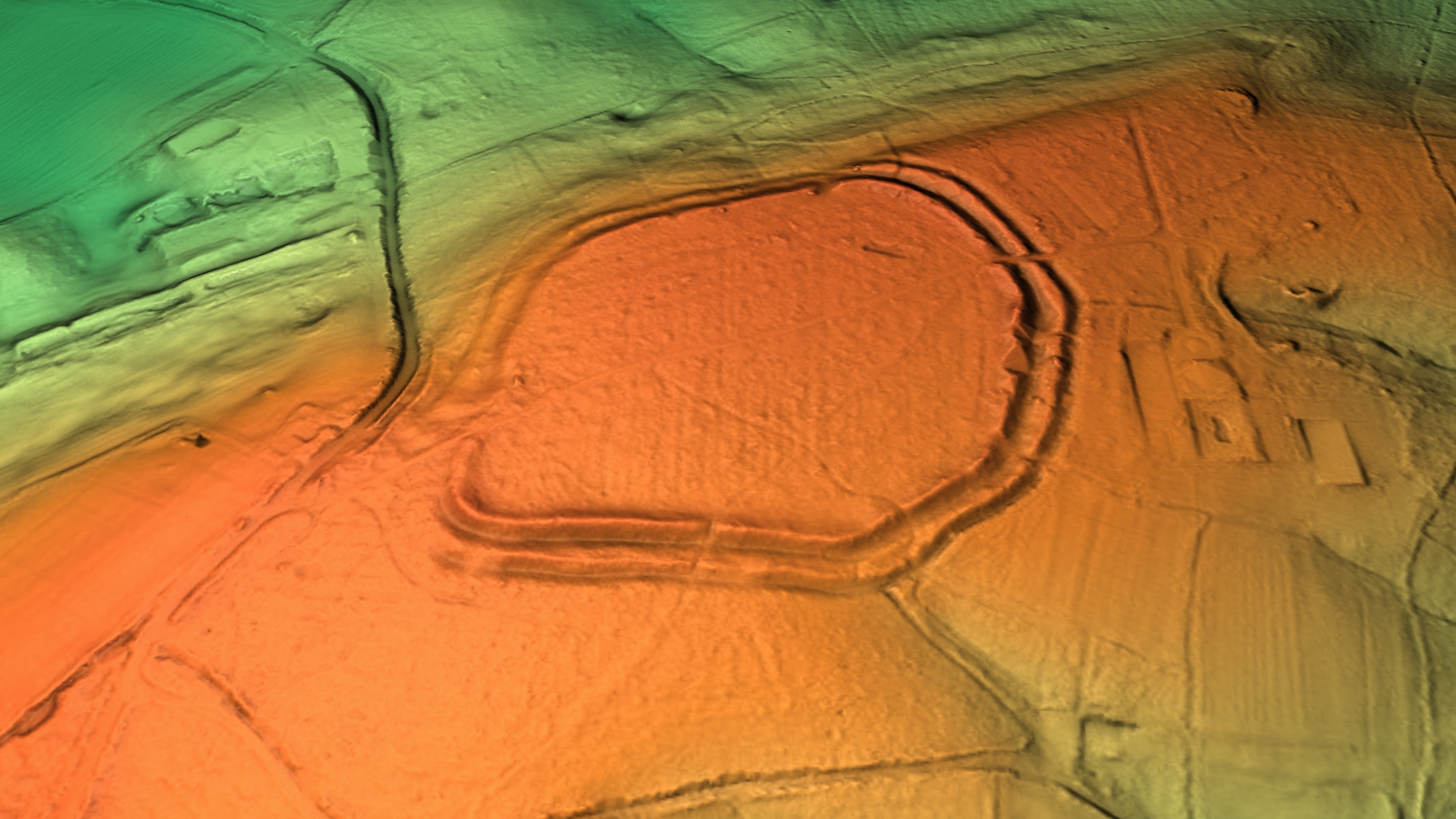
3D view of the digital terrain model

It is thought that the site was occupied as early as the 6th century BC, and probably supported a fluctuating population of up to 300 ancient Britons over several hundred years. Bussock Hill and Bussock Hill House are sited close by on a slightly separate prominence to the south-east.

== Location ==
The site is located at grid reference SU467724, and to the south of the village of Chieveley, in the county of Berkshire. The site lies at a level of just over 145m AOD.

== See also ==
- List of places in Berkshire
- List of hill forts in England
- List of hill forts in Scotland
- List of hill forts in Wales
