= Spiliada Maritime Corp v Cansulex Ltd =

1986 UK legal case

- Court: House of Lords
- Decided: 19 November 1986
- Citations: [1986] UKHL 10; [1987] AC 460; [1986] 3 WLR 972; [1986] 3 All ER 843; [1987] 1 Lloyd's Rep 1; [1987] ECC 168; [1987] 1 FTLR 103; (1987) 84 LSG 113; (1986) 136 NLJ 1137; (1986) 130 SJ 925

Case history
- Prior action: [1985] 2 Lloyd's Rep 116; (1985) 82 LSG 1416

Court membership
- Judges sitting: Lord Keith of Kinkel; Lord Griffiths; Lord Mackay of Clashfern; Lord Templeman; Lord Goff of Chieveley

The Spiliada or Spiliada Maritime Corp v Cansulex Ltd [1986] UKHL 10, [1987] AC 460 is a leading decision of the House of Lords on the doctrine of forum non conveniens. It has been described as the "seminal case" on jurisdictional issues.

== Facts ==
Wet sulphur was loaded onto two ships docked in British Columbia causing damage to them. An action was brought in England by the Liberian owners of the Spiliada for the damage to the ship against the sulphur exporter. The owners of the second ship, the Cambridgeshire also brought an action in England. Both ships were insured by English insurers.

The plaintiffs applied for leave to serve the defendants ex juris. The trial judge granted leave. The defendant successfully appealed. The Court of Appeal held that the expenses alone and the existence of a B.C. limitation period were not enough to allow the claim to come to England.

Prior to the present case, an application for a stay or dismissal of proceedings falling within the proper jurisdiction of the court could only be granted on very narrow grounds. As stated in prior jurisprudence, the court could only stay the proceedings on the grounds that the suit was "oppressive, vexatious or an abuse of process" and that "the stay would not cause an injustice to the plaintiff".

== Judgment ==
The appeal was allowed. Lord Goff wrote the lead judgment, with which all other Lords concurred. Lord Templeman wrote a concurring judgment which expanded on certain points, with which Lord Griffiths and Lord Mackay concurred.

In his judgment, Lord Goff summarised what he felt to be the current state of the law governing forum non conveniens:

1. A stay will only be granted where the court is satisfied that there is some other available forum in which the case may be tried more suitably for the interests of all the parties and the ends of justice.
2. The burden of proof rests on the defendant to persuade the court to exercise its discretion to grant a stay, but if the court is satisfied that there is another available forum which is prima facie the appropriate forum for the trial of the action, the burden will then shift to the plaintiff to show that there are special circumstances by reason of which justice requires that the trial should nevertheless take place in this country.
3. Where there is some other forum which is the appropriate forum for the trial of the action, the burden resting on the defendant is not just to show that England is not the natural or appropriate forum for the trial, but to establish that there is another available forum which is clearly or distinctly more appropriate than the English forum.
4. Where there exists some other forum which is clearly more appropriate for the trial of the action, the court will look first to see what factors there are which point in the direction of another forum. Such factors may include the availability of witnesses, the law governing the relevant transaction, and the places where the parties respectively reside or carry on business.
5. If the court concludes at that stage that there is no other available forum which is clearly more appropriate for the trial of the action, it will ordinarily refuse a stay.
6. If however the court concludes at that stage that there is some other available forum which prima facie is clearly more appropriate for the trial of the action, it will ordinarily grant a stay unless there are circumstances by reason of which justice requires that a stay should nevertheless not be granted.

In his concurrence, Lord Templeman noted the complexity of the case at hand, observing that, "In the present case, a vessel managed partly in Greece and partly in England, flying the flag of Liberia and owned by a Liberian corporation is said to have been damaged by a cargo loaded by a British Columbia shipper and carried from Vancouver to India. Both sets of insurers are English." He declared:

The factors which the court is entitled to take into account in considering whether one forum is more appropriate are legion. The authorities do not, perhaps cannot, give any clear guidance as to how these factors are to be weighed in any particular case. Any dispute over the appropriate forum is complicated by the fact that each party is seeking an advantage and may be influenced by considerations which are not apparent to the judge or considerations which are not relevant for his purpose.... In the result, it seems to me that the solution of disputes about the relative merits of trial in England and trial abroad is pre-eminently a matter for the trial judge.

== Significance ==
Spiliada has since been adopted in numerous jurisdictions including Canada, Singapore, New Zealand, and Hong Kong. The standard, however, has been rejected by Australia, where it has been held that a local court can only decline to exercise jurisdiction if it can be established that it is a clearly inappropriate forum. This has been subject to subsequent debate.

== See also ==
- List of House of Lords cases
