= Hermitage, Berkshire =

Village in Berkshire, England

Coordinates: 51.452536°N 1.276217°W

Hermitage
- Village and civil parish
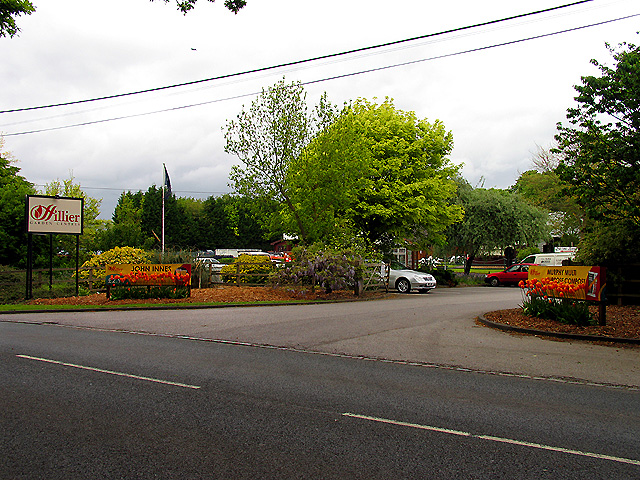
- Garden Centre

- Location within Berkshire
- Area: 6.36 km^{2} (2.46 sq mi)
- Population: 1,943 (2011 census)
  - Density: 306/km^{2} (790/sq mi)
- Civil parish: Hermitage
- Unitary authority: West Berkshire
- Ceremonial county: Berkshire
- Region: South East
- Country: England
- Sovereign state: United Kingdom
- Post town: NEWBURY
- Postcode district: RG18
- Dialling code: 01635
- Police: Thames Valley
- Fire: Royal Berkshire
- Ambulance: South Central
- UK Parliament: Newbury

Hermitage is a village and civil parish, near Newbury, in the English county of Berkshire. The civil parish is made up of a number of settlements: Hermitage village, Little Hungerford and Wellhouse.

== Location ==
The village is focused residentially on the B4009, 5 miles (8 km) north east of Newbury in the heart of the North Wessex Downs, an Area of Outstanding Natural Beauty. It is thus surrounded by protected woodlands and undulating fields providing a few elevated viewpoints.

== History ==
On Oare Common are two curvilinear ditched enclosures which are probably of prehistoric date, although it has also been suggested that they may represent a motte and bailey castle. The hill fort of Grimsbury Castle is in Grimsbury Wood. A folly stands at its centre. A 2nd and 3rd century Roman villa of some pretensions was discovered at Wellhouse in the Victorian era. Between 1917 and 1918 D. H. Lawrence lived in Hermitage, at Chapel Farm Cottage in Chapel Lane. His novella The Fox is set in the area, with Bailey Farm based on Grimsby Farm. Three early 21st century housing areas were completed in the north and south. These include Forest Edge and Hermitage Green.

== Amenities ==
It has a general store and post office, a church (Holy Trinity) and two public houses, The Fox and The White Horse of Hermitage, and a garden centre. The village primary school feeds into the Downs School. The area is predominantly agricultural and the main local employers are the village school, village pre-school, the garden centre and a small light industrial unit housing several small businesses.

Holy Trinity church dates from 1839, and was funded by local donations, under the patronage of the Marquess of Downshire who had a residence at Easthampstead Park near Bracknell, 29 miles (47 km) from Hermitage. The Dowager Queen Adelaide, widow of the late King William IV, gave the communion plate.

== Transport ==
Access to the M4, which links London to Bristol and South Wales, is within 5 miles (8 km) and it passes through the edge of the parish. The A34, a major north–south road, also passes through the edge of the parish. From 1882 until the 1960s the village was served by Hermitage railway station, on the Didcot, Newbury and Southampton Railway. As of July 2022, Hermitage is served by buses 6 and 6A from Newbury.

== Demography ==
2011 Published Statistics: Population, home ownership and extracts from Physical Environment, surveyed in 2005
Output area	Homes owned outright	Owned with a loan	Socially rented	Privately rented	Other	Usual residents	km^{2}
Civil parish	192	312	66	104	16	1943	6.36
