= Lipkin Gorman v Karpnale Ltd =

English case

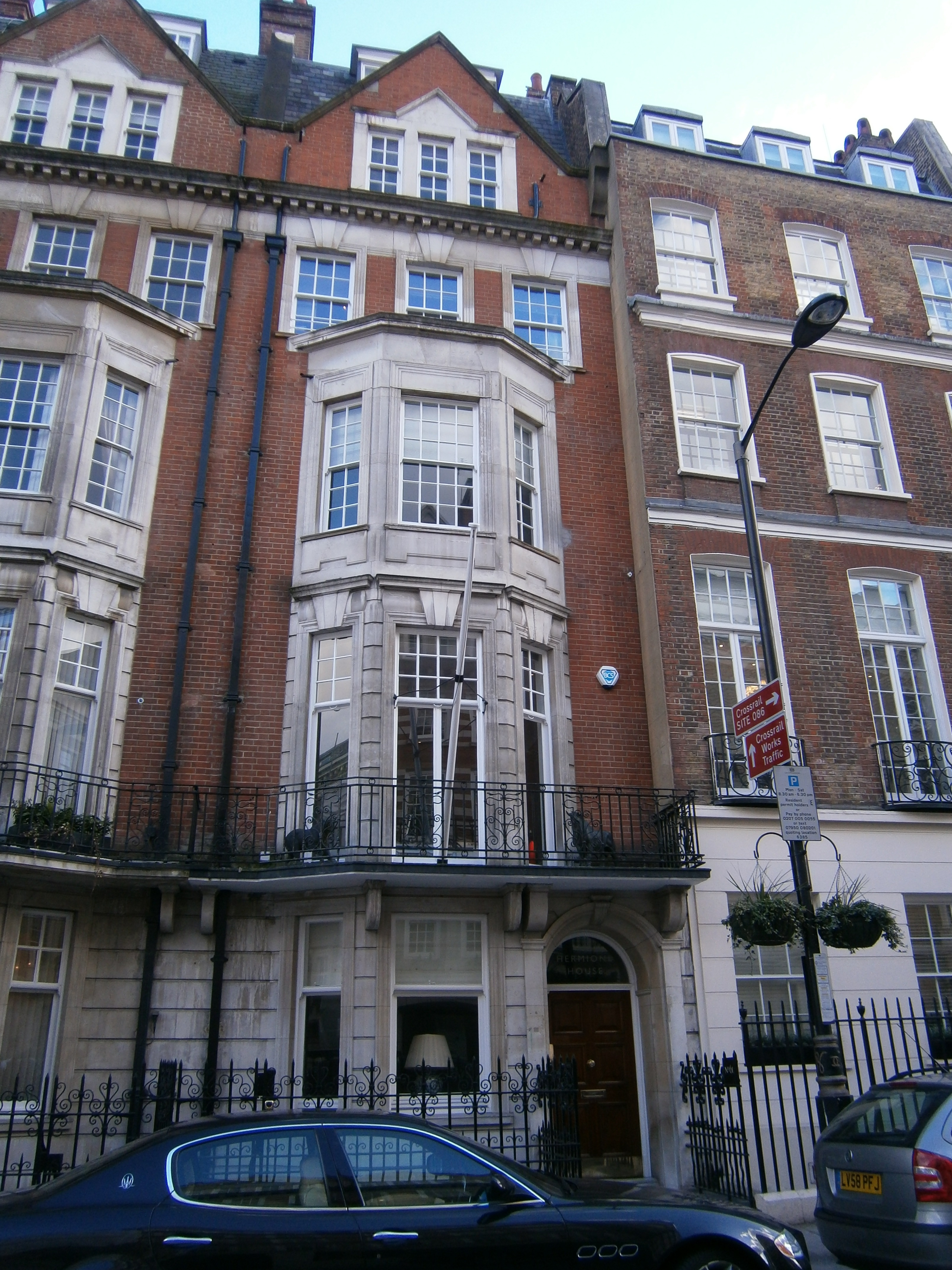
- Lipkin Gorman's offices
- Court: House of Lords
- Full case name: Lipkin Gorman (a firm) v (1) Karpnale Ltd, and (2) Lloyds Bank plc
- Decided: 6 June 1991
- Citations: [1988] UKHL 12 [1991] 2 AC 548 [1992] 4 All ER 331 [1991] 3 WLR 10 [1993] 1 LRC 730; 12 LDAB 73 [1991] NLJR 815
- Transcript: Full text from Bailii

Case history
- Prior actions: [1989] 1 WLR 1340 (CA) [1987] 1 WLR 987 (High Court)

Court membership
- Judges sitting: Lord Bridge of Harwich; Lord Templeman; Lord Griffiths; Lord Ackner; Lord Goff of Chieveley

Keywords
- Unjust enrichment, change of position

Lipkin Gorman v Karpnale Ltd [1988] UKHL 12 (6 June 1991) is a foundational English unjust enrichment case. The House of Lords unanimously established that the basis of an action for money had and received is the principle of unjust enrichment, and that an award of restitution is subject to a defence of change of position. This secured unjust enrichment as the third pillar in English law of the law of obligations, along with contract and tort. It has been called a landmark decision.

Although the case is most famous for the transformative judgment handed down by the House of Lords in relation to restitution and unjust enrichment, the decision of the Court of Appeal is also an important banking law decision in its own right, setting out key principles relating to the duty of care owed by bankers to their customers. There was no appeal against that part of the decision to the House of Lords.

== Facts ==
Norman Barry Cass was a partner in a solicitors' firm called Lipkin Gorman. He was an authorised signatory at the firm’s Lloyds Bank account. He took out £220,000 and used it for gambling at the Playboy Club, 45 Park Lane, London which was owned by Karpnale Ltd. Between March and November 1980, the club won £154,695 of the stolen money (the rest paid back to Mr Cass in ‘winnings’). Mr Cass fled to Israel, but was brought back and sentenced to three years prison for theft in 1984. Lipkin Gorman sued the club for return of the stolen money. At the time, gambling contracts were contrary to public policy, and therefore void under the Gaming Act 1845 section 18.

Alliott J in the High Court, and then the Court of Appeal (May LJ and Parker LJ, but Nicholls LJ dissenting), dismissed the majority of Lipkin Gorman's claims against the club (save only for a relatively small claim in conversion relating to a bank draft). The House of Lords judged that the club had to repay Lipkin Gorman the proportion of the stolen money which the club had won from Mr Cass, thus enriching themselves. Lipkin Gorman were partially successful against their bank in the High Court, but lost in the Court of Appeal on appeal and cross-appeal, and they abandoned their claim against the bank in the House of Lords.

== Judgments ==
=== First Instance ===
The trial at first instance lasted three weeks and came before Alliot J. The Court of Appeal noted that the trial judge had a particularly complex task, trying to reconcile a large number of different pleaded causes of action together with complex and sprawling allegations of fact.

At first instance the claims were equally focussed upon the club and the firm's bankers (against whom the claimant solicitors pleaded both negligence and liability as constructive trustees). Unusually, at the end of the plaintiff's case, the bank's counsel (Jonathan Sumption QC) made a submission of "no case to answer" and offered no evidence.

Alliot J gave judgment against the club, but only for conversion of a bank draft for a relatively small amount. The larger claim for money had and received failed. Against the bank the judge made a stinging series of findings, including that "Mr Fox [manager of the bank] deliberately and systematically suppressed his knowledge of Cass' gambling from coming to his superior's notice", and that "Mr Fox deliberately lied to Mr Gorman."

=== Court of Appeal ===
In the Court of Appeal all three judges gave reasoned judgments. Both May LJ and Parker LJ dismissed the claims of the firm against the club for money had and received on the basis that the club had provided good consideration. Although they accepted that gaming contracts were void, prior to the gambling the money was exchanged for chips, which were as good as cash inside the club for gambling or paying for drinks or other entertainment.

Although the decision of the Court of Appeal is often overlooked because of the importance of the House of Lord's judgment, the judgments of the Court of Appeal on the issue of bank liability were not appealed, and remain the leading authority on the duty of care owed by a bank to its customer. Unfortunately, the discussion of the issue in the Court of Appeal was complicated because of the way the plaintiff law firm's claim was pleaded and the offering of no evidence by the bank. Nonetheless the comments of the Court of Appeal are important.

There were two broad claims against the bank: one as constructive trustee and other for negligence. Each alleged that the bank knew or ought to have known that Cass was drawing on the firm's bank account for the purposes of satisfying his personal gambling problem, and yet they failed to take any action. The Court of Appeal accepted counsel's submission that the bank could not be liable as constructive trustee if it was not shown to be at least negligent. May LJ also asserted nothing less than actual knowledge should constitute a third party as constructive trustee. The Court further held that the bank had not been negligent, and thus could not be liable as constructive trustee. The Court noted the large number of cheques cleared daily, and that in this case only approximately one-seventh of the cheques drawn on the firm's account were fraudulent (and that the firm was one of over 2,800 customers of the bank branch). May LJ held "There is nothing ... express or implied, which could require a banker to consider the commercial wisdom or otherwise of the particular transaction. ... In my opinion any implied term requiring the banker to exercise care must be limited. To a substantial extent the banker's obligation under such a contract is largely automatic or mechanical. Presented with a cheque drawn in accordance with the terms of that contract, the bank must honour it save in what I would expect to be exceptional circumstances."

=== House of Lords ===
The House of Lords held that £150,960 should be repaid as money had and received, and the club was also liable for damages of £3,735 to the solicitors for conversion of a banker’s draft that had been used once for gambling, rather than cash.

Lord Templeman said, the money could be recovered.

if they can show that in the circumstances the club was unjustly enriched at the expense of the solicitors… The club received stolen money by way of gift from the thief; the club, being a volunteer, has been unjustly enriched at the expense of the solicitors from whom the money had been stolen and the club must reimburse the solicitors.

Lord Goff said that the change of position defence was debated but

the consensus being to the effect that such a defence should be recognised in English law. I myself am under no doubt that this is right.

== Significance ==
As a result, the defence of change of position was recognized for the first time in English law and it succeeded as a partial defence here. Because the winnings have been paid out to Cass, the club has effectively changed its position and its liability is limited to the remaining sum of £150,960.

== See also ==
- English unjust enrichment
