= Kelly v Solari =

- Citation: (1841) 9 M&W 54; 152 ER 24

Kelly v Solari (1841) 9 M&W 54, 152 ER 24 is an early common law case, where the principle of unjust enrichment underpinned the decision of the court.

== Facts ==
Mr. Solari died. His widow claimed under his life insurance policy as executrix. The insurers later found they were not in, fact, liable to pay because he had not paid a premium instalment. The policy had been marked lapsed, but the office had not checked.

== Judgment ==
The Court of Exchequer held that the widow was bound to repay. Her lack of fault was irrelevant, or the insurers were careless.

Parke B said if the money,

is paid under the impression of the truth or a fact which is untrue, it may, generally speaking, be recovered back, however careless the party paying may have been, in omitting to use due diligence to inquire into the fact. In such a case the receiver was not entitled to it, nor intended to have it.

Rolfe B said to the fact that Mrs Solari was innocent ‘it cannot be otherwise than unconscientious to retain it.’ (i.e. the money).
