= Oare, Berkshire =

Village in Berkshire, England

Coordinates: 51.4623°N 1.2716°W

Oare
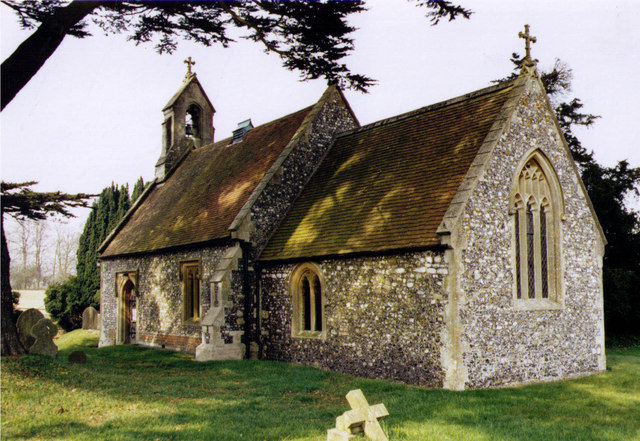
- St Bartholomew's Church, Oare

- Location within Berkshire
- Civil parish: Chieveley
- Unitary authority: West Berkshire
- Ceremonial county: Berkshire
- Region: South East
- Country: England
- Sovereign state: United Kingdom
- Post town: Newbury
- Postcode district: RG20
- Dialling code: 01635
- Police: Thames Valley
- Fire: Royal Berkshire
- Ambulance: South Central
- UK Parliament: Newbury

Oare is a small village in the civil parish of Chieveley in the English county of Berkshire.

== History ==
Oare boasts the earliest documented history within the parish. In 638, King Edgar gave Oare Chapel to the Abbot of Abingdon, a gift witnessed by Saint Dunstan, Archbishop of Canterbury. Ten hides of land (around 1200 acres) accompanied it.

A monastic grange was built by the abbot at which he could rest on the arduous journey between Abingdon and Winchester. The grange was where Oare Farm House now stands. All that remains of the original is a very fine garden wall. The pond beside the church was formerly used by the monks and prior to hold carp for their Friday meals. The grange was pulled down during the Dissolution of the Monasteries in the reign of Henry VIII, leaving the little church for the people. Oare became a chapel of Chieveley at that time.

The church, dedicated to St Bartholomew, is described by Historic England as "C15, almost completely re-built in Decorated style in 1852". It is Grade II listed, as is Roean Cottage to the west, and a barn at Kiln Farm.

The M4 motorway runs just to the north of the village between junctions 12 (Theale) and 13 (Chieveley Services); this section opened in 1971.
