= Mathew Thorpe =

British judge (born 1938)

Sir Mathew Alexander Thorpe (born 30 July 1938) is a retired Lord Justice of Appeal, who served as one of the judges of the Court of Appeal of England and Wales from 1995 to 2013.

== Education ==
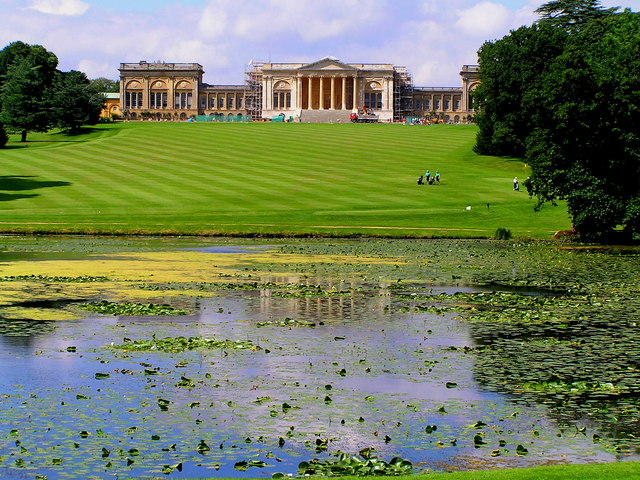
Stowe School

Thorpe was educated at Stowe School and Balliol College, Oxford.

== Legal career ==
Thorpe was called to the bar (Inner Temple) in 1961 and was appointed a Queen's Counsel in 1980. He was appointed a Recorder in 1982. He was appointed a High Court judge on 11 April 1988, assigned to the Family Division, and received the customary knighthood. He was appointed a Lord Justice of Appeal on 2 October 1995. Thorpe was appointed Deputy Head of Family Justice and Head of International Justice in January 2005. He retired on 31 July 2013

== Jurisprudence ==
He has presided over a number of important cases which have influenced the evolution of family law. He is regarded as a traditionalist in respect of parenting role but as a reactionary by his detractors.

1. Roles of men and women Re: S (Children) [2002] EWCA Civ 583

This case concerned a divorce where the mother had a high salary and the father stayed at home to look after the children under a shared parenting arrangement. If residence had been awarded to the father, the status quo in London would continue. However, if residence were awarded to the mother then she would move with the children to Linlithgow in Scotland. It was submitted on behalf of the father that it would be gender discrimination to decide residence in favour of the mother: if the roles were to be reversed, a father who proposed to abandon a lucrative career with the consequence that his wife and children would suffer a dramatic downturn in the standard of living, would not have the smallest chance of being given a residence order as his reward. This submission was rejected by Thorpe LJ on grounds of gender role:

"That submission seems to me to ignore the realities, namely the very different role and functions of men and women, and the reality that those who sacrifice the opportunity to provide full-time care for their children in favour of a highly competitive professional race do, not uncommonly, question the purpose of all that striving, and question whether they should not re-evaluate their life before the children have grown too old to benefit."

2. Leave to remove from the jurisdiction

This refers to the situation where the court must decide whether to grant permission to a parent who wants to take the children to live in another jurisdiction in the face of opposition from the other parent. It means that a parent (invariably the father) who continued to live in the UK would no longer have access to his children.

In Payne v Payne (2001) 2 WLR 1826, Thorpe LJ found that unilateral relocation cases had been consistently decided over 30 years upon the application of the following two propositions:

(a) the welfare of the child is the paramount consideration; and
(b) refusing the primary carer’s reasonable proposals for the relocation of her family life is likely to impact detrimentally on the welfare of her dependent children. Therefore her application to relocate will be granted unless the court concludes that it is incompatible with the welfare of the children.

Applying these principles, the Payne child was allowed to be taken to New Zealand by the mother since otherwise the effect on her of being forced to stay in England would be "devastating". This approach was followed again later in Re: B (Children) (Removal from Jurisdiction); Re: S (A Child) (Removal from Jurisdiction) (2003) (2003) 2 FLR 1043. Thorpe LJ said, in connection with two cases involving children being removed to Australia and South Africa respectively, that to frustrate "natural emigration" risked the survival of the new family or blighted its potential for "fulfilment and happiness". He said,

Often there will be a price to be paid in welfare terms by the diminution of the children's contact with their father and his extended family

He said that it was also possible for a father to take employment abroad after separation or to marry a foreigner and there would be the same loss of contact:

These are the tides of chance and life and in the exercise of its paternalistic jurisdiction it is important that the court should recognise the force of these movements and not frustrate them unless they are shown to be contrary to the welfare of the child.

== Child protection ==
Thorpe was appointed in 2010 to head a working party of the General Medical Council to consider and offer advice to doctors on matters relating to child protection.

== Driving disqualification and reprimand ==
Thorpe was disqualified from driving and then, in January 2012, was reprimanded by the Lord Chancellor and Lord Chief Justice, both for receiving the ban and for failing to adhere to the guidance regarding the reporting of traffic offences.
