= Robert Goff, Baron Goff of Chieveley =

English barrister and judge (1926–2016)

The Right Honourable The Lord Goff of Chieveley PC FBA
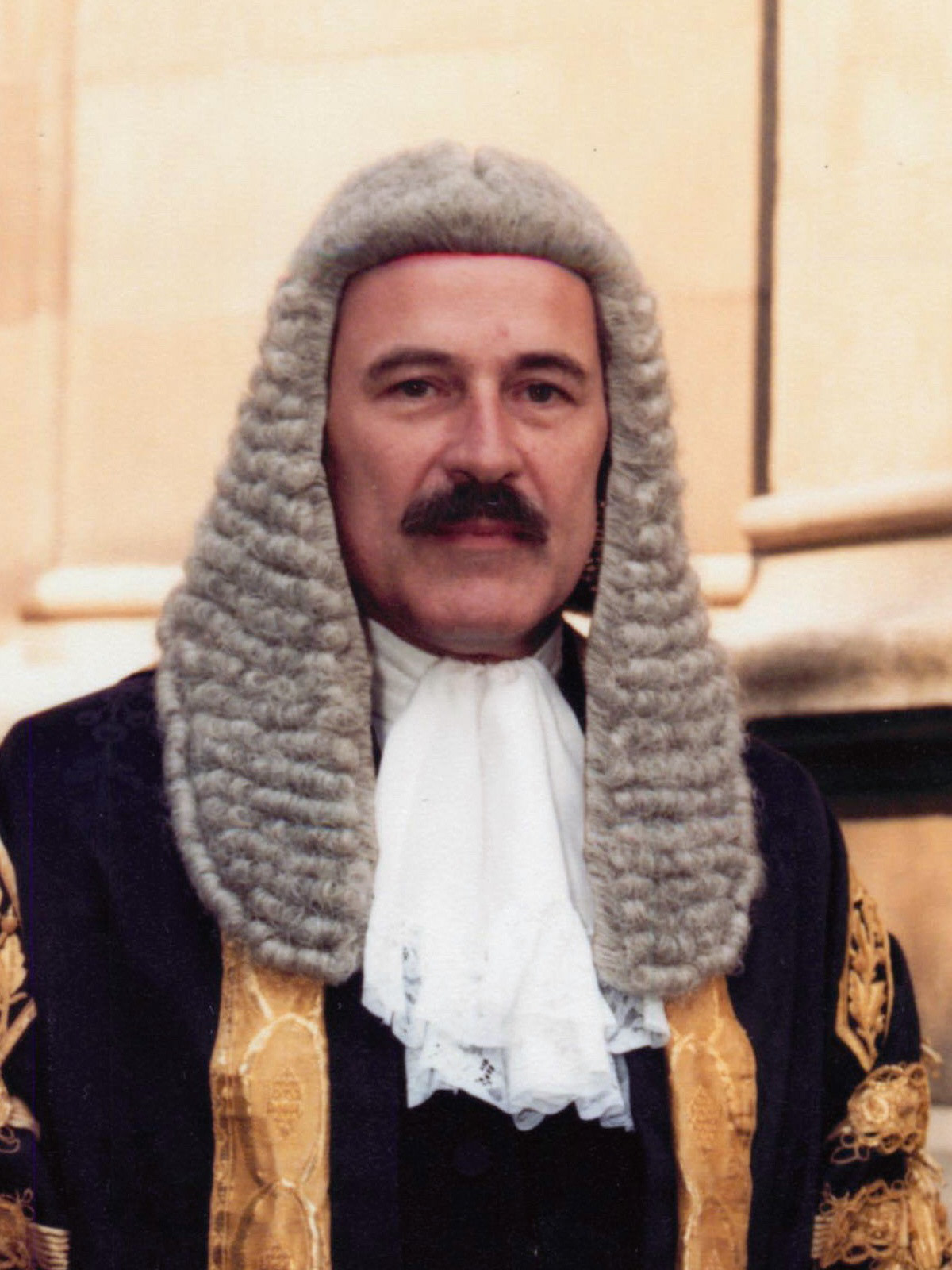
- Lord Goff

Senior Lord of Appeal in Ordinary
- In office 1 October 1996 – 30 September 1998
- Preceded by: The Lord Keith of Kinkel
- Succeeded by: The Lord Browne-Wilkinson

Member of the House of Lords
- Lord Temporal
- Lord of Appeal in Ordinary; 9 February 1986 – 14 August 2016

Lord of Appeal in Ordinary
- In office 6 February 1986 – 30 September 1998
- Preceded by: The Lord Roskill
- Succeeded by: The Lord Hobhouse of Woodborough

Personal details
- Born: Robert Lionel Archibald Goff; 12 November 1926 Kinloch, Perthshire, Scotland
- Died: 14 August 2016 (aged 89) Cambridge, England
- Spouse: Sarah Cousins (m. 1953)
- Children: 4
- Education: New College, Oxford (BA)
- Awards: Order of Merit of the Federal Republic of Germany (First Class)

Military service
- Allegiance: United Kingdom
- Branch/service: British Army
- Years of service: 1944−1948
- Rank: Second Lieutenant
- Unit: Scots Guards
- Battles/wars: World War II

Robert Lionel Archibald Goff, Baron Goff of Chieveley, PC, FBA (12 November 1926 – 14 August 2016) was an English barrister and judge who was Senior Lord of Appeal in Ordinary, the equivalent of today's President of the Supreme Court. Best known for establishing unjust enrichment as a branch of English law, he has been described by Andrew Burrows as "the greatest judge of modern times". Goff was the original co-author of Goff & Jones, the leading English law textbook on restitution and unjust enrichment, first published in 1966. He practised as a commercial barrister from 1951 to 1975, following which he began his career as a judge. He was appointed to the Judicial Committee of the House of Lords in 1986.

Goff was born in his mother's family home in Perthshire, Scotland, and was raised in Hampshire, England. He obtained a place at New College, Oxford, but was called up in December 1944 and served in the Scots Guards in Italy until going to Oxford in October 1948. He earned a first-class degree in Jurisprudence there, and three weeks after receiving his examination results was offered a fellowship at Oxford. He accepted this on condition that he could be called to the Bar first. He was called to the Bar at the Inner Temple in 1951, and appointed fellow and tutor at Lincoln College, Oxford, and a university lecturer in Jurisprudence in 1952. He was High Steward of the University of Oxford from 1991 to 2001.

As one of the few early academics-turned-judges, Goff long advocated a complementary view of the role of the legal academic and judge. In this respect, the former Lord Justice of Appeal Sir Stephen Tomlinson said that "no judge has done more than Robert to ensure that the views of legal academic commentators now regularly inform the decision-making in our higher courts".

Towards the later part of his life, he developed an interest in sharing perspectives with foreign lawyers and judges. For building bridges between judges in the United Kingdom and Germany, Goff was awarded the Order of Merit of the Federal Republic of Germany (First Class).

== Early life and education ==
Robert Goff was born on 12 November 1926, as the second child and only son of Lionel Trevor Goff and Isobel Jane Higgon (née Denroche-Smith). Lionel studied at Eton College and the Royal Military Academy, Woolwich, and was commissioned in the Royal Artillery in 1897. As a young officer, Lionel fought in the Second Boer War, was wounded in the siege of Ladysmith and was mentioned in dispatches. He also served in the First World War, and was wounded in 1917 and again mentioned in dispatches. He remained hospitalised for his wounds until 1921. In 1923, he married Isobel Higgon, née Denroche-Smith, a widow of Archibald Bellairs Higgon, who had been killed in action in 1915. Isobel's family home was near Alyth, North Perthshire, and her father had been a civil servant in Bengal.

Robert was brought up at the Goff home in Monk Sherborne, Hampshire. He had a closer relationship with his mother than his father. Lionel's principal interests were in fishing, hunting, shooting and riding, and he did not share his son's passion for music. Likewise, Robert did not share his father's interests, and gave up shooting after he turned eighteen.

Goff attended a dame school in Basingstoke until he was eight. Thereafter, he attended St Aubyns School, Rottingdean, and started at Eton College in September 1939, at the beginning of the Second World War. While at Eton, he focused on classical languages and history, preferring these to science subjects. There, Henry Ley, an organist who had played at the coronation of King George VI, encouraged his love for the piano and taught him to play. He left Eton in December 1944, having received a deferred offer of admission to New College, Oxford, for after he completed his military service.

=== Military service ===
In December 1944, towards the end of the Second World War, Goff was called up for service with the British Army and was commissioned as a second lieutenant into the Scots Guards. His service number was 354970. He trained for battle in the Far East, having been told that he would be deployed there in September 1945. Following the surrender of Japan in August 1945, these plans were cancelled.

Instead, Goff spent some time on guard duty at Windsor Castle, and then volunteered to serve in the force being sent to Italy to counter Marshal Tito, where he remained until July 1948. During this period, he spent his leave travelling and exploring northern Italy, skiing, and pursuing cultural interests, while introducing the men under his command to them.

On occasion, he would combine setting up communications posts with visits with his men to see Italian art, including Michelangelo's David and Piero della Francesca's Polyptych of Perugia.

=== University education ===
In 1948, Goff took up his place at Oxford for a two-year "shortened" Final Honour Schools course for ex-servicemen. Having been given a choice between reading Jurisprudence, Greats or History, he chose Jurisprudence, with the aim of practising as a barrister after graduating.

At New College, his tutors included Jack Butterworth and Wilfrid Bourne. He graduated with a first class degree in 1950, having served as steward of the Junior Common Room.

== Career ==
=== Academic career ===
Although Goff had intended to go straight to the Bar after graduation, these plans changed shortly after his examination results were released. Keith Murray, the Rector of Lincoln College, Oxford, telephoned him to invite him to a meeting. At this meeting, Murray indicated that a fellowship and tutorship in law had become vacant following Harold Hanbury's appointment as Vinerian Professor of English Law, and that he wished to offer it to Goff. Goff, astonished, asked for half an hour to consider the proposal. In apparent surprise that Goff needed to think about the offer, Murray granted the time, following which Goff accepted the offer, on condition that he could first sit the Bar exams and be called to the Bar. Murray agreed to this and Goff was called by Inner Temple in 1951. In October 1951, he began teaching at Lincoln College, and remained there until the end of the 1954–55 academic year. Alongside his teaching, he served on various committees and briefly as dean in 1952–53 when the incumbent was on leave. His students included Swinton Thomas, who would become a judge of the Court of Appeal.

Aware that he had done a shortened two-year course in law, in which he only studied six subjects in limited depth, Goff did "some pretty hectic and thorough preparation for tutorials". He taught a range of subjects, including Criminal Law and Roman Law. His schedule was hectic, teaching nearly 50 students in a single year, some of whom required multiple tutorials a week. To share the workload, the College permitted him to recruit a weekender.

This role was fulfilled by Pat Neill, who was then a Prize Fellow at All Souls College. He gave joint classes with Tony Honoré, where it is suggested that he met A. W. B. Simpson, his successor at Lincoln College. When he left full-time academia for the Bar, Sir Walter Oakeshott, Rector of Lincoln College, said that "there was widespread hope of his being content to go on as an academic lawyer, and by his departure law studies at Oxford, as well as the College, will suffer greatly".

==== Goff & Jones on the Law of Unjust Enrichment ====
In 1952, Goff was appointed to a Common University Fund lectureship in law, to take effect in 1953. In this capacity, he was required to give a series of lectures on any area of interest to him. When exploring texts for inspiration, he chanced upon "quasi-contracts", a concept traceable to Roman law, but which was at that point unrecognised in English law.

Together with Ronald Maudsley, then the law tutor at Brasenose College, he set up a series of seminars in Restitution, also described as "Unjustifiable Enrichment" and "Quasi Contract". The lectures were not on the syllabus and not many students attended. They did attract academic attendees, some of whom, such as Peter North, went on to be distinguished academic lawyers.

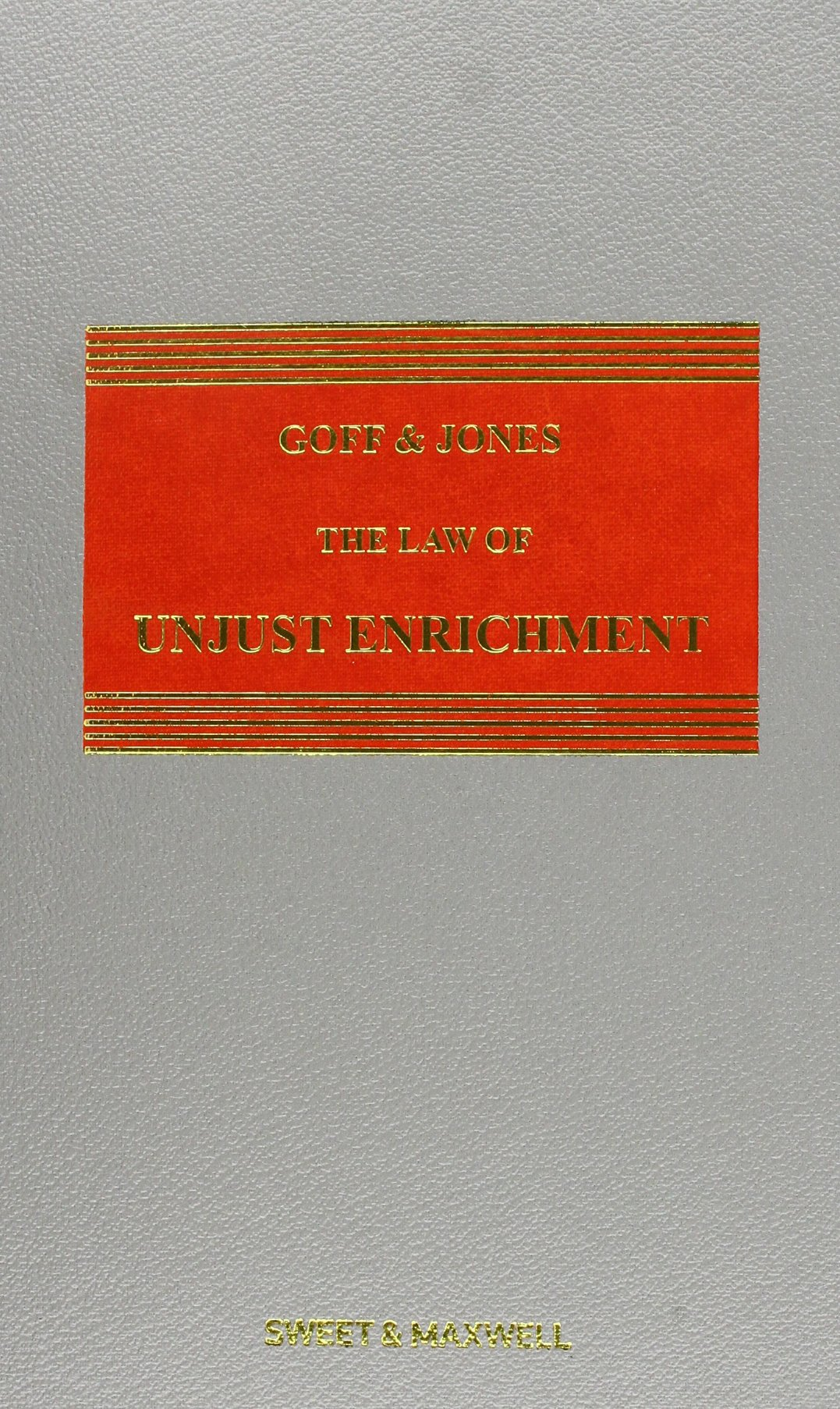
Goff & Jones on the Law of Unjust Enrichment, now in its ninth edition

On the basis of these lectures, Goff and Maudsley jointly began work on the book that would later become Goff and Jones on the Law of Restitution (today published as Goff and Jones on the Law of Unjust Enrichment). Goff had continued drafting the textbook after leaving academia for the Commercial Bar. At the time, work for junior barristers was limited, and so he spent considerable time working on the book at the Inner Temple library. During this period, Maudsley spent long stretches of time in the United States, and did not respond to Goff's communications.

In 1959, Goff was reading a Law Quarterly Review and came across an article written by Maudsley, which he believed to be based heavily on the material they had prepared in their joint lectures. Goff wrote to Maudsley once again, but upon not receiving a reply, concluded that Maudsley "was signing off and didn't feel able to tell me". As a junior barrister with a growing practice, Goff realised that if his book was to be completed, he would need a collaborator. A. W. B. Simpson introduced him to Gareth Jones, then fellow at Trinity College, Cambridge, and later Downing Professor of the Laws of England, with whom he would eventually publish the book. Goff would later describe Jones as "the ideal co-author" and "beyond doubt, one of the finest teachers in the common law world".

The book publication took much longer than either Goff or Jones anticipated. The manuscript was submitted in late 1964. The page proofs, which arrived in 1965, had so many mistakes and required so many alterations that the publishers, Sweet & Maxwell, made the authors pay for a second set of proofs. As a result, Goff and Jones made practically no money from the first edition of the book, and Goff complained that Sweet & Maxwell "appeared to understand nothing about writing pioneering books". The book was finally published in 1966.

Upon its release, the book was quickly recognised as a significant work, and was largely favourably reviewed. Lord Denning reflected positively on it, calling it "a creative work" and comparing it to Sir Frederick Pollock's treatise on torts and the seminal textbook Anson's Law of Contract. Edmund Davies, then a judge of the High Court of Justice, described it as "admirable". The book's propositions caused some confusion in academic circles. Not knowing where it fitted, a university library classified it as Criminal Law, and a library of one of the Inns of Court refused to take the book in at all. The book's propositions were not unanimously welcomed. For example, they were resisted by Lord Diplock, who as late as in 1977 continued to declare judicially that "there is no general doctrine of unjust enrichment recognised in English law".

Goff submitted the textbook to the University of Oxford for the consideration of a higher degree, and he was awarded a Doctor of Civil Law in 1971. He would later receive honorary degrees from the universities of London, Bristol, Reading, Buckingham and City, University of London. In 1975, Goff was appointed to the High Court. Goff and Jones jointly wrote two further editions of the textbook, which were published in 1978 and 1986, respectively. In the latter year, Goff was appointed to the House of Lords.

He was elected a Fellow of the British Academy in 1987, and would go on to hold Honorary Fellowships at three Oxford colleges: New College, Lincoln, and Wolfson.

=== Career at the Bar ===
Goff left academia to join the Commercial Bar in 1955, at a time when the prevailing belief was that there was a sharp difference between the academic lawyer and the practicing lawyer. He joined the chambers of Ashton Roskill QC, then known as 5, King's Bench Walk (but which later amalgamated with 6, King's Bench Walk to form what is today known as 7, King's Bench Walk, or 7KBW). He described his time as a junior barrister as "lean", because at that time, the bulk of cases went to senior barristers, who tended to have almost permanent junior barristers assisting them. Goff was led by Roskill twice when his usual junior had pneumonia, but was hardly led by anyone else. He took this as an opportunity to teach at Inner Temple and on weekends at Lincoln College, and to continue writing his book on the law of restitution.

Goff believed the publication of Goff and Jones on the Law of Restitution in 1966 to be one of the reasons he was appointed Queen's Counsel (QC) the following year. After this, his practice grew significantly. He appeared in significant and technically difficult commercial cases such as The Mihalis Angelos, and The Brimnes. His choice of junior was Brian Davenport, a close friend whom he described as "exceptionally gifted", but who was diagnosed with multiple sclerosis in his early thirties. Over the course of his practice, he led many juniors, some of whom went on to hold high judicial office, such as Andrew Longmore, Mark Saville, Nick Phillips, and John Hobhouse.

Since 2018, 7KBW has commemorated Goff's contributions through the annual The Lords Goff and Hobhouse Memorial Lectures.

=== Judicial career ===
In 1974, Goff was appointed Recorder of the Crown Court. In October 1975, after eight years as a QC, Goff was appointed to the High Court, and received the customary knighthood. He spent seven years at the High Court, two of which he spent as the Judge-in-Charge of the Commercial Court. In 1982, he was made a Lord Justice of Appeal and sworn in as a Privy Councillor, becoming judicially known as Lord Justice Robert Goff (not to be confused with Sir Reginald Goff, known as Goff LJ). On 6 February 1986, Goff was made a Lord of Appeal in Ordinary and a life peer as Baron Goff of Chieveley, of Chieveley in the Royal County of Berkshire. On 1 October 1996, The Lord Keith of Kinkel retired as Senior Lord of Appeal in Ordinary and Goff succeeded him. He retired in 1998, but continued to sit on cases occasionally until his 75th birthday. He was succeeded as Senior Lord of Appeal in Ordinary by Lord Browne-Wilkinson, and his vacant seat on the House of Lords bench was taken over by his former junior Lord Hobhouse. Over those 12 years, he participated in over 300 cases at the House of Lords and 160 cases at the Privy Council.

As an academic-turned-judge, Goff believed that the two professions were different, yet complementary. Upon his appointment to the House of Lords, he was appalled to find poor library and research facilities available, and wrote a paper to the House of Lords authorities, arguing for the provision of a better equipped library for the Law Lords' use. In his Maccabean Lecture to the British Academy in 1983, he described the judge and jurist as on a shared "search for principle", saying that it was the fusion of their work that led to the development of the common law. Three years after the lecture, he said that "it is difficult to overestimate the influence of the jurist in England today". In Spiliada Maritime Corp v Cansulex Ltd in 1986, Goff used elevated language, describing jurists as “pilgrims with [judges] on the endless road to unattainable perfection”. In 1987, Goff wrote an article titled Judge, Jurist and Legislature, in which he detailed his views on the roles of these players in the legal system. In 1999, he said that he did not know how far he had succeeded in promoting an appropriate recognition of academia's contribution to the development of English law, but that, if he had, "that alone will give me great satisfaction." Goff's views influenced others to think about the role of judges and jurists, inspiring the later Lord of Appeal in Ordinary Alan Rodger's first article in 1994, and lectures given by then President of the Supreme Court David Neuberger and Lord Justice of Appeal Jack Beatson.

Goff was a strong believer in the common law as a legal system. This came with a preference for the common law's characteristic incremental development of the law by judges, and a suspicion of codes and legislation, which carried greater weight in civil legal systems. Nevertheless, he supported the work of the Law Commission enthusiastically. This was despite the disapproval of some of his colleagues, according to whom Goff had broken the unspoken rule that no judicial reference was to be made to the work of the Law Commission. In line with his belief in the complementarity of the academic lawyer and judge, he worked to dispel the hostility towards them in the House of Lords. Among the Law Commissioners he supported were his former junior barrister Brian Davenport QC, Jack Beatson and Andrew Burrows. Since then, several Law Commissioners have been appointed to the Supreme Court, marking a significant change in judicial attitudes towards the Law Commission.

As a Law Lord, he furthered the cause of restitution that he had developed academically. In Lipkin Gorman v Karpnale Ltd, he gave judicial recognition to the proposition that unjust enrichment is an independent branch of private law. Graham Virgo, who has disagreed with the reasoning in Lipkin Gorman, nevertheless described it as "probably the most important dictum in the modern law of restitution". His judgment in Kleinwort Benson Ltd v Lincoln CC was described by Lord Hoffmann as "one of the most distinguished of his luminous contributions to this branch of the law" and by Lord Browne-Wilkinson, who dissented, as containing "yet another major contribution to the law of restitution". Andrew Burrows would later describe him as "the greatest judge of modern times".

Over the course of his judicial career, he presided over a number of other key cases, including:

==== Leading cases of national significance ====
- BP Exploration Co (Libya) Ltd v Hunt (No 2)

This case caught national attention as part of the litigation flowing from Libya's nationalisation of its oilfields in 1971. Two years after BP had purchased a half-share of the Sarir oilfield from Nelson Bunker Hunt, Libya nationalised it. BP claimed that the contract had been frustrated, which would entitle it to compensation under the Law Reform (Frustrated Contracts) Act 1943. The legal historian John Baker described the case as legally complex, "involving such vast fortunes that millions of dollars turned upon every nuance of meaning in the 1943 Act". Goff presided over the case in the High Court, holding that the contract had been frustrated and that BP was entitled to damages. Notably, Goff wrote the headnote himself, setting a precedent in law reporting. He also reworked parts of Goff and Jones on the Law of Unjust Enrichment to accommodate the judgment.

- Airedale NHS Trust v Bland

Anthony Bland was a 17-year-old Liverpool supporter who had travelled with two friends to Hillsborough Stadium for an FA Cup semi-final between Liverpool and Nottingham Forest on 15 April 1989. A fatal human crush occurred, causing Bland serious injury and leaving him in a persistent vegetative state. Goff issued a legal ruling allowing doctors to withdraw his treatment at the request of his family, since there had been no sign of improvement in his condition, there was no reasonable possibility that he would ever emerge from his persistent vegetative state, and was unlikely to survive more than five years. The case provoked significant public discussion over the moral, social and ethical issues of withdrawing life support from an insensate patient.

- The Spycatcher case

In 1985, former spy Peter Wright attempted to publish Spycatcher, a memoir detailing his work in British intelligence, in violation of the Official Secrets Act 1911. Following the Government of the United Kingdom's attempts to ban it, it saw a dramatic increase in popularity, selling nearly two million copies worldwide by October 1988. The case in the House of Lords raised important questions relating to the law on breach of confidence, public policy and freedom of expression.

- Hunter v Canary Wharf Ltd

Several hundred people filed a claim against the builders of the skyscraper One Canada Square in the tort of private nuisance, because it interfered with their television signal. The court held, controversially, that the plaintiffs did not have a legal right to television signal.

- Re Pinochet (No. 3)

A Spanish court requested the extradition of the former president of Chile, Augusto Pinochet, who was accused of murder, torture and conspiracy to murder. Although Goff had retired by the time this case was heard, he returned on an ad-hoc basis to hear it. The case gained attention because of its implications for the law on immunities and extradition.

- Attorney General v Blake

This case concerned the MI5 double agent George Blake. Following his escape from prison and flight to the Soviet Union, he wrote a book about his experiences and work in British intelligence, which was published by Jonathan Cape. The government sought to force the publishers to give up all earnings from the sale of the book, arguing that it had harmed the public interest and that the author and publisher should not be allowed to profit from it. Goff joined the majority opinion, ruling in favour of the government.

==== Leading cases of legal importance ====
- Barclays Bank Ltd v W J Simms, Son and Cooke (Southern) Ltd
- Collins v Wilcock
- Spiliada Maritime Corp v Cansulex Ltd
- Société Nationale Industrielle Aérospatiale v Lee Kui Jak
- Lipkin Gorman v Karpnale Ltd
- Cambridge Water Co Ltd v Eastern Counties Leather plc
- Henderson v Merrett Syndicates Ltd
- White v Jones
- Westdeutsche Landesbank Girozentrale v Islington LBC
- Hunter v Canary Wharf Ltd
- Kleinwort Benson Ltd v Lincoln CC

== Public service and engagement ==
=== Fostering links with foreign jurisdictions ===
Goff gave many public lectures around the world, partly motivated by his belief that the common law was a uniquely adaptable system which deserved better understanding in civil law jurisdictions. He led judicial exchanges with Germany, France and Italy, in recognition for which he was awarded the Grand Cross (First Class) of the Order of Merit of the Federal Republic of Germany. At the invitation of the Indian jurist and diplomat Laxmi Mall Singhvi, he conducted two three-week lecture tours in India in 1984 and 1986 (the year he was appointed to the House of Lords). These lectures were delivered in four cities. He also delivered the inaugural G S Pathak Memorial Lecture in New Delhi, where he remarked that the difference between Germany and England was that in Germany, "the Professor is God, but in England, the Judge is God". In 1990, Goff delivered the first of the annual Lord Goff lectures at the City University of Hong Kong. He delivered lectures in Jerusalem, Chicago and Stockholm.

=== Work with the Inns of Court ===
When Goff left academia for the Bar, he brought with him a strong interest in the welfare of students and young barristers. At the time, Inner Temple (his Inn of Court) provided almost no educational support. Shortly after moving to the Bar, he and a fellow barrister arranged for lectures to be delivered to Bar students at Inner Temple. Lecturers included Rupert Cross, C. H. S. Fifoot, Peter Carter, Robert Heuston, and Marjorie Reeves (who had been his wife Sarah Cousins's tutor at Oxford).

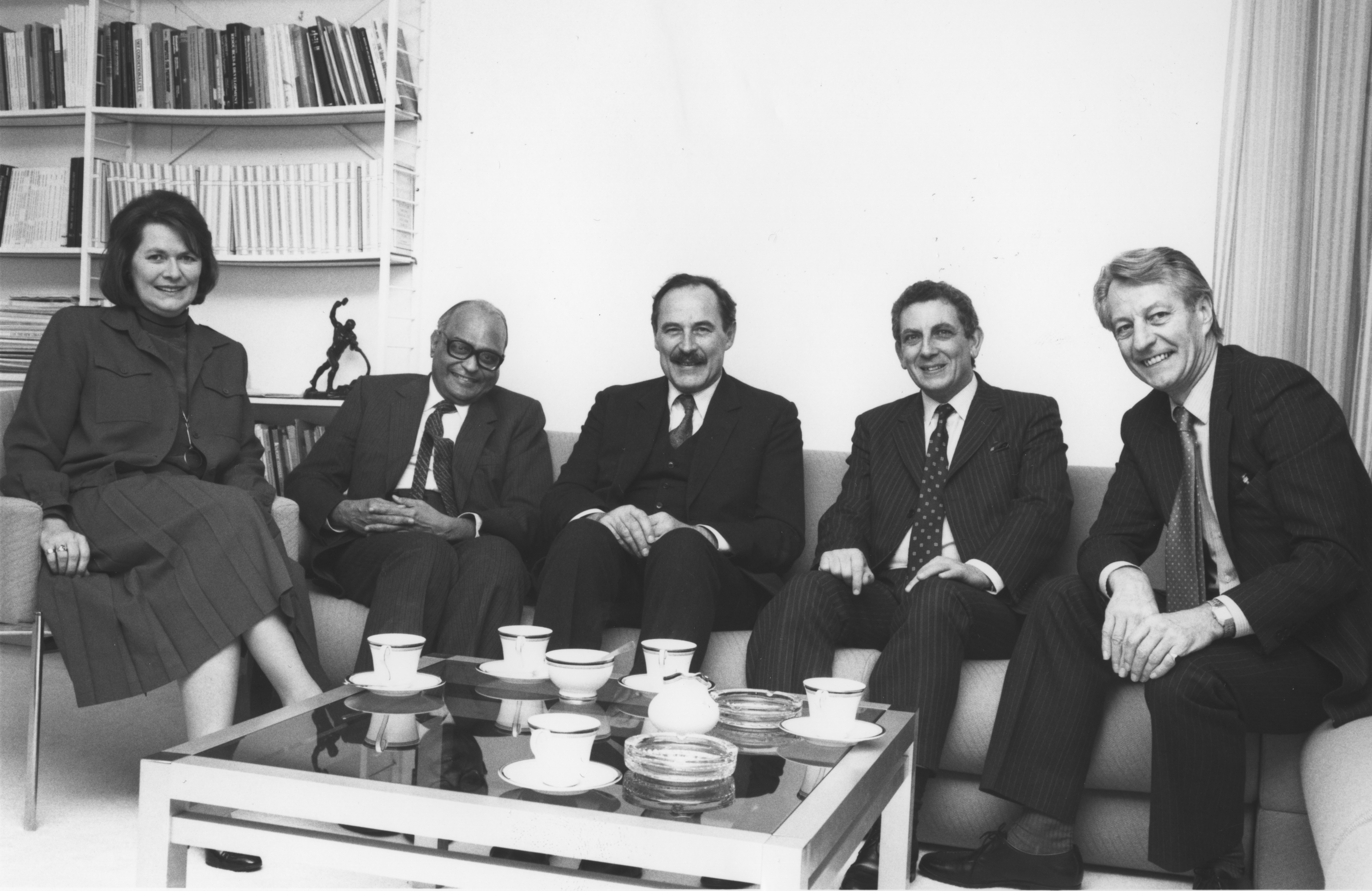
From left to right: Dr Christine Challis, I. G. Patel, Lord Goff (Chairman of the University of London Court), Peter Howell (Principal University of London), and Professor R. A. Pinker (Pro Director)

In 1987, when the Inner Temple was going through a time of economic difficulty, Goff was asked by the Treasurer to chair an appeal to boost its Scholarship Fund. This fund evolved into the Pegasus Trust, which supports the exchange of young lawyers in many common law countries, and which was one of Goff's key contributions as a member of Inner Temple. To fund it, Goff assembled a committee of Benchers, including Lord Mackay of Clashfern (Lord Chancellor) and James Callaghan (a former Prime Minister), who was able to secure the support of the Cambridge Commonwealth Trust. He entertained Lord King, then Chairman of British Airways, to lunch, a meeting which resulted in British Airways providing free flights for Pegasus Scholars. According to Stephen Tomlinson, the Pegasus Trust was a "valuable and lasting legacy", which represented Goff's belief in the importance of linking different jurisdictions, as well as his interest in the welfare of young barristers. It subsequently evolved into a collaborative effort between the four Inns of Court, supporting his belief that the Inns should work more closely.

In establishing it, Goff said that:

"The common law is one of the greatest forces for good in the world. For many, the common law means the rule of law and the absolute independence of the judiciary. It is of paramount importance for the future of the common law that bridges should be built between the legal professions in the many countries of the world which live under this system."

=== Appointments ===
Goff's other appointments included:

- High Steward of the University of Oxford (1991–2001)
- Chairman (1986–2000) and President (2000–2008) of the British Institute of International and Comparative Law
- President of the Chartered Institute of Arbitrators (1986–1991)
- Patron of the Oxford University Commonwealth Law Journal
- Chairman of the Council of Legal Education, which oversaw the teaching and examination of the Bar Final examinations.

== Personal life ==
Goff first met his wife Sarah Cousins in autumn 1952, at a birthday party in Hampshire. She had just graduated from St Anne's College, Oxford, having read History, and was starting a BLitt. They were married in July 1953, and lived in Oxford until 1955, when Goff went to the Bar. As a young academic couple, they became good friends with various academics, including Jack Butterworth, Maurice Platnauer, and Tom Boase. They shared a love for opera, which Goff encouraged in their children. They had four children, one of whom died young. The family lived in London until 1975, and then moved to Chieveley House in Berkshire.

Goff was an accomplished pianist; he began his days with a Mozart sonata and spent considerable time transposing and arranging pieces of music for the family collection of instruments. His love of music remained with him into the later years of his life, when his health was failing. He described music as what "fed his soul and relaxed him". He was particularly fond of the countryside and gardening.

Goff was described as giving off a first impression of remoteness, reticence and formidable formality, as a result of his distinction as a lawyer or having inherited a military bearing from his father. He was also described as warm, kind and passionate about his students.

In 2004, Goff's health began to decline. In 2006, he and his wife moved from Chieveley House to Cambridge to live near their daughter Juliet, where he remained until his death in 2016.

== Arms ==
Coat of arms of Robert Goff, Baron Goff of Chieveley
Crest A squirrel sejant proper. Escutcheon Azure a chevron between in chief two fleur-de-lis and in base a lion rampant Or Motto Fier Sans Tache

Legal offices
Preceded by The Lord Keith of Kinkel	Senior Law Lord; 1996–1998	Succeeded by The Lord Browne-Wilkinson
