= Kleinwort Benson Ltd v Birmingham City Council =

Kleinwort Benson Ltd v Birmingham CC
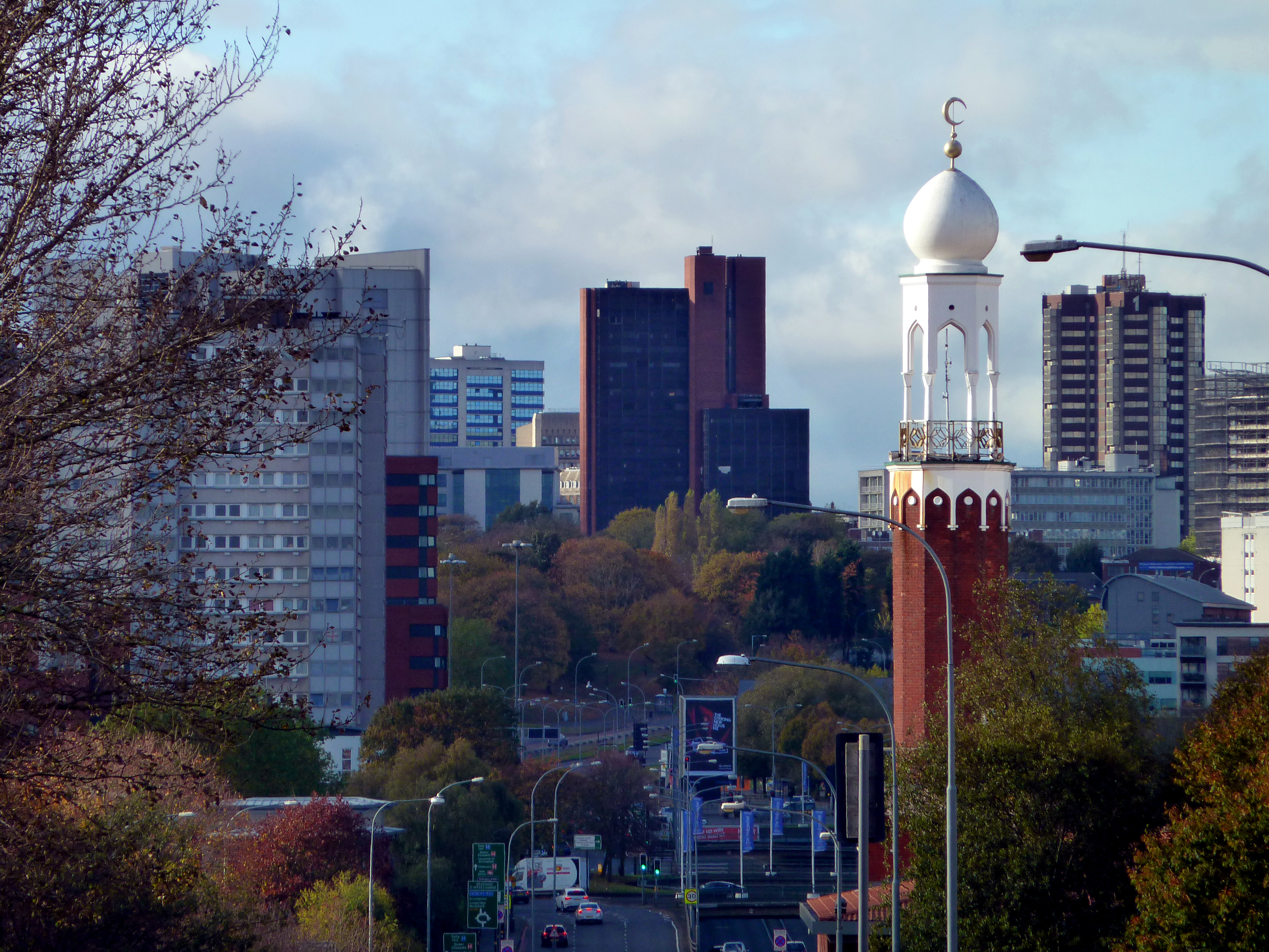
- Court: Court of Appeal
- Citation: [1996] 4 All ER 733

Court membership
- Judges sitting: Evans LJ, Saville LJ, Morritt LJ

Case opinions
- Evans LJ, Saville LJ

Keywords
- restitution, unjust enrichment, loss, derivatives

Kleinwort Benson Ltd v Birmingham CC [1996] 4 All ER 733 is an English unjust enrichment law case, concerning to what extent enrichment of the defendant must be at the expense of the claimant. It rejected a defence of "passing on" the gain against a claim of unjust enrichment.

== Facts ==
Kleinwort Benson, a bank, paid Birmingham City Council money under interest rate swap agreements that were later declared to be ultra vires and void by the House of Lords. The council argued it did not have to repay the money because the bank had passed on its losses through hedging transactions long before.

== Judgment ==
The Court of Appeal rejected that there could be a passing on defence. It rejected that there was any analogy to compensating for loss, so that it could be avoided or passed on. First, the payments received by the bank under the hedge contract were not causally connected with the payments of the bank under the swap contract. Second, the claims in unjust enrichment are not subject to a restriction on the defendant’s gain that it must correspond with loss. (Note: Goff & Jones (2011), pp. 6–73 argues the second part was not the ratio, the first was obiter.) Evans LJ gave the leading judgment, referring to American, Australian and Canadian authority outlining the problems of a passing on defence. Saville LJ gave the second judgment.

He does not cease to be unjustly enriched because the payer for one reason or another is not out of pocket. His obligation to return the money is not based on any loss the payer may have sustained, but on the simple ground that it is unjust... [The phrase "at the expense of" describes] the need for the payer to show that his money was used to pay the payee... What this expression does not justify is the importation of concepts of loss or damage with their attendant concepts of mitigation, for these have nothing whatever to do with the reason why our law imposes an obligation on the payee to repay to the payer what he has no right to retain.

Morritt LJ concurred.

[The words at the expense of] ... do no more than point to the requirement that the immediate source of the unjust enrichment must be the plaintiff... [Subtraction relates to] ...the plaintiff’s gross wealth. The suggested defence of passing on would involve the different concept of a reduction in the net worth of the plaintiff.

== See also ==
- English unjust enrichment law
- Local authorities swaps litigation

== Bibliography ==
- Goff, Robert; Jones, Gareth (2011). Mitchell, Charles; Mitchell, Paul; Watterson, Stephen (eds.). Goff and Jones on the Law of Unjust Enrichment (8th ed.). Sweet & Maxwell. ISBN 978-1-84703-910-1.
