= McDonald v Coys of Kensington (Sales) Ltd =

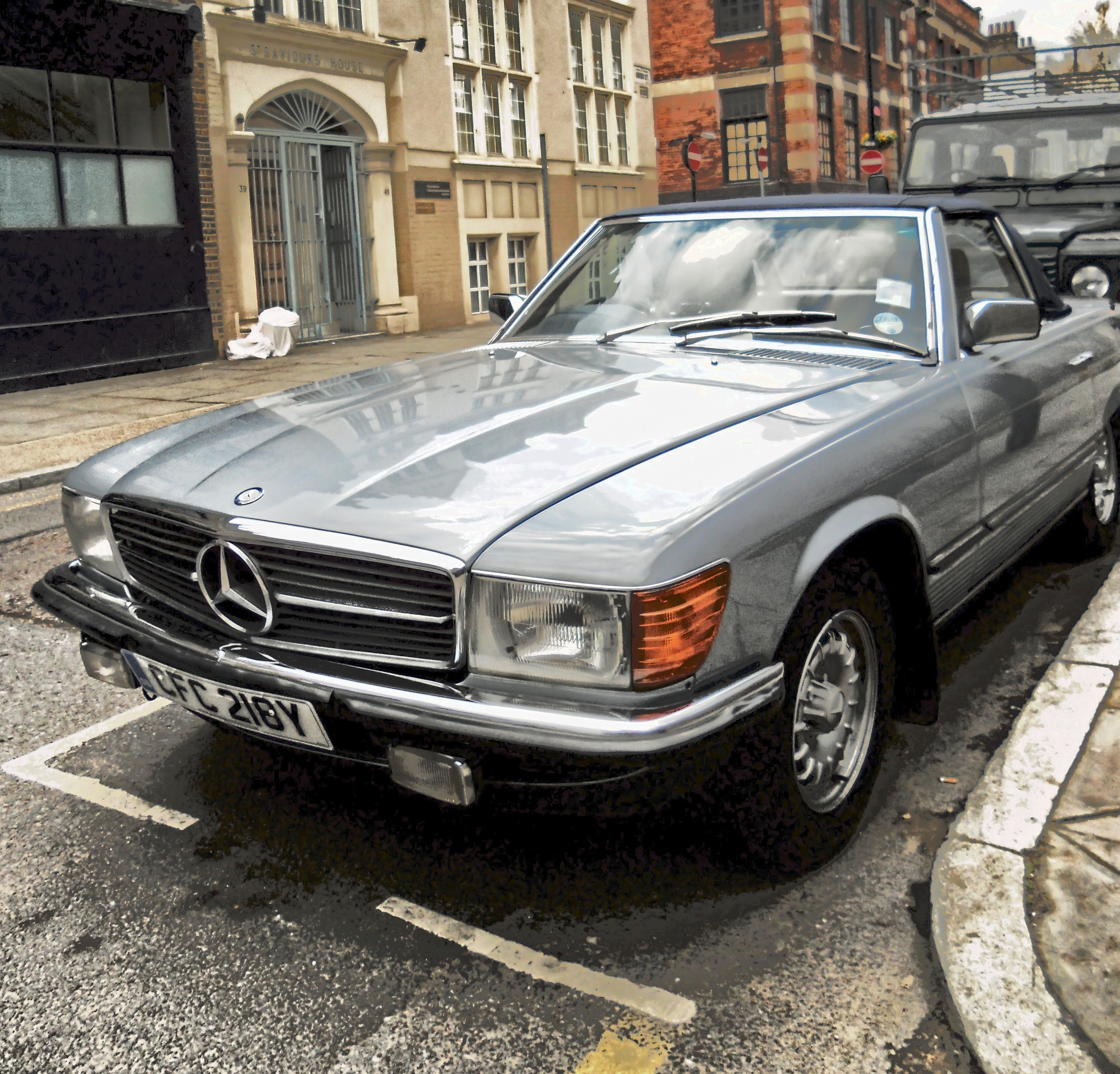
- Court: Court of Appeal
- Citations: [2004] EWCA Civ 47, [2004] 1 WLR 2775

Keywords
- Enrichment

McDonald v Coys of Kensington (Sales) Ltd [2004] EWCA Civ 47 is an English unjust enrichment law case, concerning the nature of an enrichment.

== Facts ==
Coys of Kensington, an auctioneer, had sold a Mercedes 280 SL to Mr McDonald for £20,290. However, Coys mistakenly included the personalised number plate (TAC 1). This alone was worth £15,000. Mr McDonald became statutorily entitled to it and he registered it in his name. Coys compensated the car’s former owners with £13,608, Mr and Mrs Cressman, who were executors for the late Mr T A Cressman for the loss of the numberplate. Coys then sought a 100% contribution from Mr McDonald plus the remaining £1,392 as assignees of the Cressmans’ cause of action.

== Judgment ==
Mance LJ held that the full £15,000 could be recovered from Mr McDonald. He was unjustly enriched, and it was not important that this was connected to the statutory scheme for registration of number plates.

28. The law's general concern is with benefit to the particular defendant, or so-called 'subjective devaluation'. Mr McDonald has not actually realised or received any monetary benefit from the mark. Professor Birks and Goff & Jones both identify (a) free acceptance and (b) incontrovertible benefit as two main categories of case in which a defendant who has not realised any actual monetary benefit may be treated as unjustly enriched. Professor Birks (in response to a critique by Professor Burrows) has stressed that 'free acceptance' should not be understood as meaning that the recipient values the thing in question, but as unconscientious conduct precluding him or her from exercising the usual right to assert that he or she was not subjectively benefited: see In Defence of Free Acceptance in Essays on the Law of Restitution (ed. Burrows) (1991) pp. 105-146. Professor Burrows disagrees about the possibility of free acceptance - cf Free Acceptance and the Law of Restitution (1988) 104 LQR 576 and The Law of Restitution pp. 20-23 - basically because free acceptance may amount to "nothing more than indifference to the objective benefit being rendered". Consistently with that objection, he suggests that 'reprehensible seeking-out' (where a recipient's conduct clearly shows that he wants the benefit, but also that he is unwilling to pay for it) should suffice as a test of benefit (pp. 24-25). Citing some extreme examples (holding a pistol to a doctor's head and demanding medical treatment, stealing goods and intentionally using another's land without permission), he goes on:

"Although there are no authorities specifically on this point, the defendant in such situations must be regarded as benefited (by the objective value of the subject matter). He cannot rationally say that he was indifferent to receiving the thing: and he cannot be allowed to raise the argument 'I was not willing to pay' because his reprehensible conduct shows a disregard for the bargaining process (ie the market system)."

In a footnote he comments at this point:

"It is arguable the 'seeking-out' is sufficient to outweigh the subjective devaluation objection. But as the argument for this test is one of principle, without direct support from the case law, it has been considered preferable to focus on the stronger case whether the conduct is also reprehensible"

It is of interest to recall that Professor Birks' explanation of the theory of 'free acceptance' is that the recipient's 'unconscientious conduct' precludes him or her from denying subjective benefit. Professor Burrows' text continues:

"Clearly this test runs close to free acceptance. But it is crucially distinct because in requiring a 'seeking-out' of the benefit rather than a standing-by it overcomes the indifference argument. Moreover the test is a test of benefit only. It is not intended to establish that the enrichment is unjust."

29. 'Free acceptance' and 'reprehensible seeking out' represent tests focusing on the circumstances under which Mr McDonald came to have a car carrying the registration mark TAC 1, while 'incontrovertible benefit' focuses on the subjective value to him of the mark once acquired, regardless of those circumstances. Here, because of Coys' mistake, Mr McDonald acquired a car on 12th December 2000 which had, under the statutory scheme, a right to the mark TAC 1. His acquisition of the car on that date cannot have involved any 'free acceptance' of either the mark or the right to it. Mr Brownlee of Coys had reminded or told him and he knew on 12th December that he was not to get the old mark. But the process by which Mr McDonald came to have a car carrying that mark can, I think, be regarded as extending beyond 12th December 2000. In order to register himself as keeper he applied for a registration document, entering on the form V62 the mark TAC 1 in the knowledge that this would lead to the car being registered in his name with that mark. Notes B, C and E to the form Retention of Vehicle Registration Number V778/1 (trial document E14) indicate that Mr McDonald could, even on 13th December 2000, have applied to retain the mark, with a view to re-transferring it to the estate or its order. But he made, so far as appears, no enquiry and certainly did not pursue the obvious possibility that such a step could be taken.

30. Further, on 3rd January 2001, it is clear that his discussion with the DVLA covered the possibility of retention by the sellers, and he must have been aware that this was also a course open to him. By 5th January 2001, Mr McDonald was aware that the estate and Coys would be pursuing claims against him in relation to the mark. Notwithstanding that, he still did not make any application to retain the mark, with a view to its re-transfer to the estate. Only on or about 10th January 2001 did the DVLA register him as the keeper of the car with the mark TAC 1, so that he had every opportunity to correct the position before the mistake made in his favour was consolidated.

31. It is a salient feature of this case that Mr McDonald could have exercised a right of "retention" so as to re-transfer the registration mark to the Cressmans' order, and would then in lieu have received from the DVLA the age-related mark which he had expected; he could have done this at any stage after his acquisition of the car - at least until its gift to his partner which, as I have said, cannot have been before 8th February 2001; and he refused to do this knowing that he had received the mark by mistake contrary to the auction bargain. The mark was here not just realisable, but easily returnable. The case lies outside the scope of Pollock CJ's aphorism in Taylor v. Laird (1856) 25 L.J. Exch. 329, 332: "One man cleans another's shoes. What can the other do but put them on?".

32. If the case turned on whether there was 'free acceptance' or 'reprehensible seeking-out', it would be borderline. Bearing in mind the circumstances in which Mr McDonald came to register in his name a car carrying the mark TAC 1, it could, I think, be regarded as falling within the general principle of free acceptance advocated by Professor Birks and Goff & Jones. On and after 13th December 2000 Mr McDonald was acting unconscientiously in seeking and in insisting upon such registration, in the knowledge that this was not in accordance with the bargain made and that there had been an obvious mistake. Professor Burrows' test of "reprehensible seeking-out" is on its face more stringent. But it is designed to overcome any suggestion of indifference, and it could be consistent with this rationale if the test were, if necessary, given a slightly wider re-formulation to cover circumstances such as the present. The qualification "reprehensible" derives from what Professor Burrows himself describes as "the stronger case" where the defendant shows a 'disregard for the bargaining process". Mere 'seeking-out' might in his view suffice. Here, there was positive conduct aimed at the registration in his name of his car with the old cherished mark contrary to the known bargain. What happened involved sufficient elements of knowledge, choice and action to overcome any suggestion of indifference, and can once again be seen as reprehensible in so far as it was in conscious disregard of the prior bargain. However, the case does not need to turn on whether or not its facts can be brought within a concept of 'free acceptance' or '[reprehensible] seeking-out'.

33. The alternative basis of restitutionary recovery on which Coys rely is "incontrovertible benefit". This does not depend on analysis of the circumstances in which the benefit came to be acquired and fully enjoyed. It depends on the nature and value of the benefit as and when acquired. This basis of recovery was approved in principle by Hirst J in a dictum in Procter & Gamble Philippine Manufacturing Corpn. v. Peter Cremer GmbH (The Manila) [1988] 3 AER 843. In BP Exploration Co. (Libya) Ltd. v. Hunt (No. 2) [1979] 1 WLR 783, Robert Goff J used a similar phrase at p.805D in relation to the Law Reform (Frustrated Contracts) Act 1943, which he explained at p.799D as grounded on principles of unjust enrichment. Professor Birks suggests as the test of incontrovertible benefit whether "no reasonable man would say that the defendant was not enriched". However he emphasises the major difference, in his view, between this and "the adoption of a straightforward objective standard of value" (p.116), and identifies two main cases in which the test should, in his view, be satisfied. They are cases of necessary expenditure (not here in issue) and cases of realised benefit. While he also identifies, under a third heading of "(c) others", some cases in which courts "simply took the view that the benefit was 'obvious'" (page 124), he evidently regards them as incompletely explained and exceptional cases of recourse to an objective standard.

34. In contrast, Goff & Jones in addressing incontrovertible benefits submit that it should be sufficient "that the benefit is realisable" and that it should not be necessary to show that it has been realised (para. 1-023). They comment:

"It is said that the principle of respect for the subjectivity of value would be subverted if this were accepted. But it may not be unreasonable, in some circumstances, to compel a person to sell an asset which another has mistakenly improved"

35. Goff & Jones recognise that not every financial gain may be said to be realisable, and refer in this connection to the landowner who "subject to the equitable doctrine of acquiescence, is not obliged to make restitution to the mistaken improver even though the land can of course be sold or mortgaged". In The Manila Hirst J recorded that it had been common ground between the parties that the test in cases of receipt of services was appropriately set out in Goff & Jones as being whether the defendant had "gained a financial benefit readily realisable without detriment to himself" (p.855f). In Marston Construction Co. Ltd. v. Kigass Ltd. (1989) 46 BLR 109, HHJ Bowsher QC preferred Goff & Jones's to Professor Birks' approach. Professor Burrows advocates an approach lying midway between realisation and realisability. He suggests as the test of benefit whether it is reasonably certain that the defendant will realise the positive benefit in the future. He puts the position at p.19 as follows:

"A problem with the narrow Birks view is that the date of trial is made crucial. Realisation of the benefit after trial is ignored and wily defendants may therefore be encouraged simply to wait before realising the benefit. Goff and Jones' view avoids this problem but has its own weakness because what is realisable cannot depend just on whether it is land or a chattel that is improved. The circumstances of the individual are also relevant. An improvement to a car is not realisable to the person who cannot afford to sell it and buy a suitable replacement. An improvement to land may be realisable to an owner who does not live on the land. In any event if it is clear that the defendant will not realise the benefit can it be said that he is so obviously benefited just because he could easily realise it? The best approach seems to be to take Birks' realised test but to add that the defendant will also be regarded as incontrovertibly benefited where the court regards it as reasonably certain that he will realise the positive benefit. Assessment of the defendant's future conduct is necessarily speculative but the courts commonly have to predict future conduct in assessing damages for loss, precisely to avoid the nonsense of rigidly cutting off loss at the date of trial."

36. Mr Purchas for Coys supports Goff & Jones's approach, while Mr Swirsky submits on behalf of Mr McDonald that we should adopt Professor Burrows' intermediate approach. However, I think that Professor Burrows' approach might perhaps be open to the comment that it is too restrictive, and that a requirement of proof of intention might itself also encourage tactical stances or manoeuvring not too dissimilar to that which he fears on Professor Birks' approach. Here, Mr McDonald received the mark. He did not realise any financial benefit from it, so if one were to treat Professor Birks' suggested requirement of actual realisation as relevant, it would not be met. However, Mr McDonald could easily have arranged for re-transfer of the mark to any car nominated by the estate and its financial value was easily realisable on the market, if he had so wished. If the test suggested by Goff & Jones were accepted, there would of course be no difficulty in concluding that Mr McDonald received a readily realisable benefit. That he subsequently gave it away to his partner could go at most to a possible defence of change of position. Professor Burrows' modified approach, requiring us to consider whether it was also reasonably certain that Mr McDonald would realise the financial benefit, would seem difficult to apply in or adapt to the present situation. It would fit a case where the defendant retains the alleged benefit at trial, not a case where he has apparently chosen to give it away, in knowledge of the relevant facts and claims (unless perhaps one could treat the gift away as the realisation of a benefit). Even if one were to attempt to ignore the gift away, it would be difficult, if not impossible, to consider what a defendant's intention would have been regarding realisation, if he had not given the benefit away, when giving it away is what he actually chose to do.

37. Looking at the matter generally, I have no doubt that justice requires that a person, who (as a result of some mistake which it becomes evident has been made in the execution of an agreed bargain) has a benefit or the right to a benefit for which he knows that he has not bargained or paid, should reimburse the value of that benefit to the other party if it is readily returnable without substantial difficulty or detriment and he chooses to retain it (or give it away to a third party) rather than to re-transfer it on request. Even if realisable benefit alone is not generally sufficient, the law should recognise, as a distinct category of enrichment, cases where a benefit is readily returnable. A person who receives another's chattel must either return it or pay damages, commonly measured by reference to its value. The mark is not a chattel, and it was not suggested before us that its return could at any stage (even before the gift to the partner) have been enforced, or that its non-return could sound in damages. (There were allegations below of implied duties to co-operate in the return of the mark, but the judge did not accept them, and there is no appeal in that respect.) However, Mr McDonald's insistence on keeping the mark and the absence of any obvious means of compelling its re-transfer are reasons for analysing this case in terms of unjust enrichment. Mr McDonald knew that he had not bargained or paid for the mark. The mark or its benefit was in practice easily returnable. If Mr McDonald chose to keep it, then I see every reason for treating him as benefited.

38. It also seems to me unrealistic to suppose that Mr McDonald did not in the circumstances himself attach value to the mark. By refusing to effect a re-transfer, and by later giving the car with its mark away to his partner, Mr McDonald was exercising a deliberate preference to give himself and/or his partner the practical enjoyment of the mark for the meantime and the possibility of realising its monetary value in the longer term. Before giving the car to his partner, he could have re-transferred the mark to the estate's order, or he could have given her the car on the understanding that she would re-transfer the mark to the estate's order, if he so required. Further, although I would not go as far as the judge did in equating Mr McDonald and his partner for all purposes, the practical effect of their relationship and of Mr McDonald's evidence about it cannot be ignored. They were living together with a young family, and the car was for their joint use. The expectation would have been that both would continue to benefit both by the supposed cachet and by any future sale of the mark.

39. Mr McDonald's responses under cross-examination were to the general effect that the registration mark was a matter of indifference to him and to his partner (cf transcript pp.9-10 and judgment p.11F). If that had been so, then, as the judge said, it would be difficult to understand why he took the attitude he did and did not co-operate in a re-transfer to the estate. To my mind, Mr McDonald's attitude in and after December 2000, and his conduct in giving his partner the mark with the car, show that he attached and attaches a value to the mark. Whatever their motives, numbers of car-owners pay good money to have a personalised plate. The inference is that Mr McDonald, despite his denials, attached real value to the mark, and determined that it should be retained for that reason.

40. In these circumstances, and in agreement with the judge, I would conclude that Mr McDonald received an incontrovertible benefit in the market value of the mark. Viewing the matter in the terms in which counsel presented it, there could be no difficulty in reaching this conclusion on the simple test of realisability advocated by Goff & Jones. Even if realisability is not alone generally sufficient, the ability to realise the mark in the future, coupled with the enjoyment of its possession and use in the meantime, seem to me considerable arguments in favour of a conclusion that Mr McDonald regarded himself as subjectively benefited by the mark and should be treated as benefited by its value. I would regard Professor Birks' test of realised benefit, if it were to be applied to this situation, as overly narrow, and Professor Burrows' test as inappropriate and inapplicable in the present context (unless in each case one were to treat the gift to the partner as a realisation of benefit, which seems artificial). In my view, however, the law must in any event recognise as a distinct category of enrichment cases of readily returnable benefit, of which the present is an example. I therefore conclude that Mr McDonald did obtain a benefit which he should prima facie reimburse, if not in kind then in cash.

Change of position

41. To rebut this prima facie conclusion, Mr Swirsky repeated before us the submission advanced below to the effect that Mr McDonald had changed his position and deprived himself of any benefit by giving the car with its mark to his partner. The wide view of the doctrine of change of position is that it "looks to any change of position, causally linked to the mistaken receipt, which makes it inequitable for the recipient to be required to make restitution": Scottish Equitable plc v. Derby [2001] EWCA 369; [2001] 3 AER 818, paras. 30-31 per Robert Walker LJ. Assuming this to be the correct view, still there can be nothing in the suggested defence in this case, having regard to the findings regarding the factual position set out in paragraphs 18-21 above. By the time Mr McDonald gave the car away, he knew that there had been a mistaken failure to obtain any right of retention under the statutory scheme and that both the estate and Coys would be pursuing him to recover the mark or its value. This negatives both any causal link and any inequity. A gift away made in such circumstances cannot have been made in reliance on the validity of the original receipt of the mark and cannot be regarded as having been made "in good faith", so there can be no defence of change of position: see Lipkin Gorman v. Karpnale Ltd. [1991] 2 AC 548, 560C per Lord Templeman and 580C per Lord Goff; and Niru Battery Manufacturing Co. v. Milestone Trading Ltd. [2002] EWCA 1425 (Comm.), paras. 134-5 per Moore-Bick J, approved [2003] EWCA (Civ.) 1446. Even if I had found that the gift to the partner took effect on the evening of 13th December 2000, I would also have considered that Mr McDonald was by then in possession of sufficient knowledge to exclude causal reliance and inequity or good faith: see paragraph 21 above.

== See also ==
- English unjust enrichment law
