= Chief Constable of Greater Manchester Police v Wigan Athletic AFC Ltd =

Greater Manchester Police v Wigan Athletic AFC Ltd
- Court: Court of Appeal of England and Wales
- Citations: [2008] EWCA 1449, [2009] 1 WLR 1590

Keywords
- Unjust enrichment

Chief Constable of Greater Manchester Police v Wigan Athletic AFC Ltd [2008] EWCA 1449 is an English unjust enrichment case, concerning the meaning of enrichment.

== Facts ==
Wigan Athletic AFC was required to pay for additional policing at its grounds. Without this, they could not hold matches except in breach of the safety certificate issued under the Safety of Sports Grounds Act 1975. It claimed this was unlawful.

== Judgment ==
The Court of Appeal (by a majority) held that it was not unjust for the football club to refuse to pay for policing at the additional level stipulated by the Chief Constable.

47. As the passages in Goff & Jones on restitution to which I have referred make clear, a benefit from services rendered which is neither "incontrovertible" nor requested may be established by their "free acceptance". But the concept of free acceptance, as explained in para 1-019, requires that the recipient "did not take a reasonable opportunity open to him to reject the proffered services". The relevant services were the supply of special police services at the level, in excess of that provided in the season 2002/03, to which the Club objected. The Club was unable to reject those services unless it also rejected the services which it did want and had requested. To do that would have meant that the Club could not play their home matches in the Stadium at all. In my view it is clear that there was no free acceptance of the services in dispute because the Club were, in practice, unable to reject them alone.

[...]

50. The third necessary ingredient is an "unjust factor". Given the unusual circumstances of this case I do not think there is one. There was, as Mann J observed, an impasse. Neither Mr Mason nor the Club would back down. But whereas Mr Mason might, at least experimentally, have reduced the level of policing, for the Club it was all or nothing. Either they accepted policing at the level Mr Mason required and paid for it or they stopped playing their home matches at the Stadium. Even if policing at the higher level Mr Mason insisted on is regarded as a benefit to the Club I do not consider that the Club should be made to pay for it given the "Hobson's Choice" with which it was faced.

== See also ==
- English unjust enrichment law
