= Peel (Regional Municipality of) v Canada =

Supreme Court of Canada case

- Court: Supreme Court of Canada
- Citation: [1992] 3 SCR 762

Keywords
- Enrichment

Peel (Regional Municipality of) v Canada [1992] 3 SCR 762 is a Canadian unjust enrichment law case, concerning the nature of an enrichment.

== Facts ==
The Juvenile Delinquents Act 1970 allowed courts to order municipalities to pay for delinquent children's accommodation in foster homes or with charities. The Regional Municipality of Peel was ordered to pay for a number of children to be placed with non-state bodies, but it protested that the orders were based on ultra vires secondary legislation and were void. It won this case, and then sought restitution from the provincial and federal governments, arguing it had discharged their liabilities.

== Judgment ==
The Supreme Court of Canada dismissed the restitutionary claim because it had not been shown that the provincial or federal governments had been incontrovertibly benefited by the payments. No legal liability had been discharged and there had not been any inevitable or likely expense saved.

McLachlin J gave the leading judgment, holding the benefit received by the government (even if the law should be extended to that) was not incontrovertible.

[Can the concept of benefit...] ‘encompass payments which fall short of discharging the defendant’s legal liability? We have been referred to no cases in Canada or the commonwealth where a ‘negative’ benefit has been found in absence of an underlying legal liability on the defendant...

[An incontrovertible benefit is...] a benefit which is demonstrably apparent and not subject to debate and conjecture. Where the benefit is not clear and manifest, it would be wrong to make the defendant pay, since he or she might well have preferred to decline the benefit if given the choice...

[So relief should be...] limited to situations where it is clear on the facts (on the balance of probabilities) that had the plaintiff not paid, the defendant would have done so. Otherwise, the benefit is not incontrovertible.

La Forest J, Sopinka J, Gonthier J and Cory J concurred.

Lamer CJC gave a short concurring judgment.

== See also ==
- English unjust enrichment law
