= Brown v Galbraith =

Brown and Davis v Galbraith
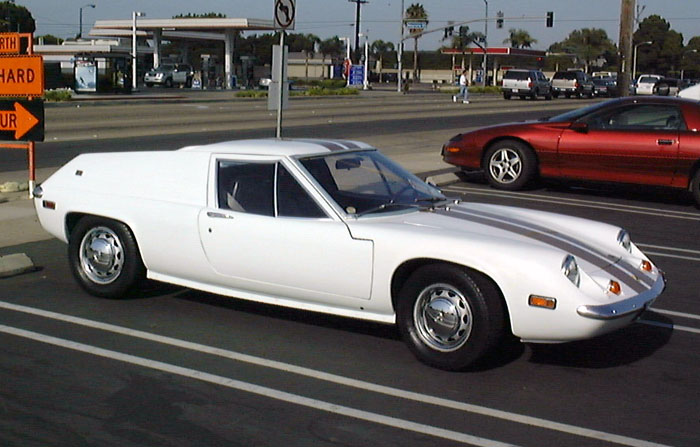
- Court: Court of Appeal
- Citation: [1972] 1 WLR 997

Keywords
- Expense of the claimant

Brown and Davis v Galbraith [1972] 1 WLR 997 is an English unjust enrichment law case, concerning to what extent enrichment of the defendant must be at the expense of the claimant.

== Facts ==
Brown and Davis sued Mr Galbraith for their price in repairing Mr Galbraith's Lotus after a collision, because his insurer had gone insolvent. Mr Galbraith's comprehensive insurance policy, said he would pay £25 on any claim, and the insurance company would cover the rest. The garage's quote was labour costs of £165, and spare parts coming up to £373, with the excess deducted. The insurers’ assessor completed a document on 21 July 1970 authorising repair only at a lower sum, though Mr Galbraith was not told. It said ‘To be collected by repairer – excess £25 and contribution £4 10s to towing’. And ‘N.B. The insured’s confirmation should be obtained concerning these items.’ The work was done, Mr Galbraith collected the car, the garage billed the insurer, but Mr Galbraith did not agree the repairs were satisfactory and so the insurers did not pay. The garage sued Mr Galbraith in the County Court. The insurance company went insolvent. The repairers agreed they had looked to the insurers for payment generally.

Croydon County Court Judge held there were two contracts, one between the insurers and the garage in the 21 July document, and two an implied contract between the garage and the owner for payment if the insurers did not come up. Therefore, the owner could be liable for the full sum.

== Judgment ==
Cairns LJ held there was an implied contract between the garage and Mr Galbraith. But the facts did not show the owner contracted to pay anything beyond £25. Therefore, the extra £4 10s could not be recovered. It was not necessary to imply a contract, beyond the £25 excess that Mr Galbraith had undertaken to pay.

Buckley LJ gave a concurring judgment, finding there was no evidence for an inference for implying a contract to pay over the excess.

Now, the inference of such an implied contract can, in my judgment, only be drawn if it is a matter of necessary inference, that is to say, if it is an inference which the business realities of the situation really make necessary to make sense of the dealings between the parties so that they can be implemented in a sensible manner.

Sachs LJ gave a concurring judgment.

== See also ==
- English unjust enrichment law
