= Exall =

Exall is a surname which may refer to:

- Chris Exall, guitarist of Anti-Nowhere League, an English hardcore punk band formed in 1980
- John Exall, bass guitarist of Texas Hippie Coalition, an American heavy metal band
- Lewis Exall, a goalkeeper for Romulus F.C., an English football club
- May Dickson Exall (1859–1936), American civic leader and co-founder of the Dallas Public Library

== See also ==
- Exall v Partridge, a 1799 English unjust enrichment law case
