= English unjust enrichment law =

Legal concept under English Law

The English law of unjust enrichment is part of the English law of obligations, along with the law of contract, tort, and trusts. The law of unjust enrichment deals with circumstances in which one person is required to make restitution of a benefit acquired at the expense of another in circumstances which are unjust.

The modern law of unjust enrichment encompasses what was once known as the law of quasi-contract. Its precise scope remains a matter of controversy. Beyond quasi-contract, it is sometimes said to encompass the law relating to subrogation, contribution, recoupment, and claims to the traceable substitutes of misapplied property.

English courts have recognised that there are four steps required to establish a claim in unjust enrichment. If the following elements are satisfied, a claimant has a prima facie right to restitution:

1. the defendant has been enriched;
2. this enrichment is at the claimant's expense;
3. this enrichment at the claimant's expense is unjust; and
4. there is no applicable bar or defence.

The law of unjust enrichment is among the most unsettled areas of English law. Its existence as a separate body of law was only explicitly recognised in 1991 in Lipkin Gorman v Karpnale Ltd. While the law has rapidly developed over the last three decades, controversy continues over the precise structure, scope and nature of the law of unjust enrichment.

== Background ==
=== History ===
The notion of an obligation to make restitution of benefits received at another's expense can be traced back to Roman law. Its history in English law can be traced to the form of action known as indebitatus assumpsit. From this action came the 'common money counts'. Of present relevance are the following:

- an action for money had and received to the plaintiff's use;
- an action for money paid to the defendant's use;
- quantum meruit (that is, a claim for reasonable remuneration for services provided by the plaintiff to the defendant); and
- quantum valebat (that is, a claim for the reasonable value of goods provided by the plaintiff to the defendant).

During the course of the 18th and 19th centuries the law of contract, the law of tort and the law of trusts emerged as discrete bodies of law within English private law. As many thought they covered the field, restitutionary claims as embodied in the common money counts were appended to the law of contract. The various claims were termed 'quasi-contractual'. This was because it was often necessary to plead that the defendant had promised to repay a debt, even though the promise was fictitious and the debt was imposed by the law. As recently as 1951 the House of Lords held that: "My Lords, the exact status of the law of unjust enrichment is not yet assured. It holds a predominant place in the law of Scotland and, I think, the United States, but I am content for the purposes of this case to accept the view that it forms no part of the law of England..."

While restitutionary obligations were not enforced solely through these quasi-contractual claims, the law of quasi-contract constitutes the core of the modern law of unjust enrichment. A seminal case is Moses v Macferlan (1760) 2 Burr 1005.

Perhaps more than any other area of the common law, the law of unjust enrichment has been shaped by academic writing, particularly by that of jurists from Oxford and Cambridge. Of course, the law did not develop in a vacuum: the American Law Institute drafted a Restatement of the Law of Restitution in 1937. The first major practitioner text in England appeared in 1966, written by Robert Goff and Gareth Jones. It was Robert Goff (by this time Lord Goff) who gave the leading judgment in Lipkin Gorman v Karpnale Ltd over two decades later. Professor Peter Birks was instrumental in promoting the autonomy of unjust enrichment within the law of obligations in his seminal work Introduction to the Law of Restitution. Academic writing continues to be heavily cited by the highest courts, particularly the more recent work of Professor Andrew Burrows and Professor Graham Virgo, as well as modern editions of Goff & Jones: The Law of Unjust Enrichment, now edited by Professor Charles Mitchell, Professor Paul Mitchell, and Dr Stephen Watterson. A good example of the close relationship between the academy and the profession in the development of this area of law is seen in the recent publication of the Restatement of the English Law of Unjust Enrichment.

=== Restitution or unjust enrichment? ===
As it has developed, the law of unjust enrichment has frequently been referred to as the 'law of restitution'. The difficulty with this is that it emphasises a legal response (restitution) rather than the event which gives rise to it (unjust enrichment). In doing so, it is akin to treating contract (an event which gives rise to an obligation to perform) as coterminous with compensation (the law's response to non-performance or defective performance). That approach is problematic: the law of compensation is wider than contract, encompassing compensation claims arising out of tortious conduct. This is equally true of restitution: a claimant can obtain restitution not only for an unjust enrichment, but also for a tort. It is in this sense that one can say that restitution is multi-causal: it is a legal response to a number of different events.

=== Continuing controversies ===
Controversy continues to surround many aspects of the modern law of unjust enrichment. This controversy extends to its existence as an independent body of law, some arguing that the concept of unjust enrichment lacks the explanatory power it is so frequently asserted to have.

It would be misleading to exaggerate the level of controversy, however. At least in English law, there is high authority accepting the principle of unjust enrichment as having fundamental explanatory force in this area of law. Recent decisions have continued to clarify key aspects of actions in unjust enrichment. Nevertheless, uncertainty pervades key areas of the law:

- Enrichment. The principles of enrichment and expense are more stable in cases of transfers of goods or money, but contested in cases where labour and benefits in kind are passed. This distinction owes its origin to the fact that, historically speaking, these were different kinds of claim.
- At the claimant's expense. Cases in which a benefit is received by way of a third party can cause difficult issues for courts, given the traditional assumption that a benefit must be acquired directly from the claimant.
- 'Unjust' factors. English law has typically adopted an 'unjust factor' approach, whereby the claimant must positively identify a reason why the defendant's enrichment is 'unjust'. 'Unjust' is a generalisation of all the circumstances in which the law calls for restitution. Recognised grounds of restitution include mistake, duress, undue influence and failure of consideration. The unjust factor approach contrasts with certain civilian systems which may adopt an 'absence of basis' approach, whereby the claimant need only show that there is no good reason ('basis') for the defendant's enrichment.
- Defences. The categories of defences are also controversial: "change of position" is a general defence, although the law recognises estoppel, the bona fide purchaser defence, and others as alternatives.
- Remedy: personal or proprietary? The law's remedial response to unjust enrichment is particularly controversial. The historical core of unjust enrichment lies in quasi-contract. The quasi-contractual actions were common law claims which awarded a claimant the money value of the benefit received by the defendant. As the law has extended beyond such claims, unjust enrichment scholars have debated the scope of proprietary relief: that is, whether the court should recognise that (or declare that) the claimant has a beneficial or security interest in property held by the defendant (or a third party, as in the case of subrogation to extinguished rights).

Despite this controversy, the statement by Justice Deane appears to remain an accurate statement of the place of unjust enrichment in the Anglo-Australian law of obligations: "[The concept of unjust enrichment] constitutes a unifying legal concept which explains why the law recognises, in a variety of distinct categories of case, an obligation on the part of a defendant to make fair and just restitution for a benefit derived at the expense of a plaintiff and which assists in the determination, by the ordinary processes of legal reasoning, of the question whether the law should, in justice, recognise such an obligation in a new or developing category of case.

== Analytic framework ==
English courts have recognised that there are four steps involved in establishing a claim to restitution for unjust enrichment. This analytic framework was developed by academics such as Professor Peter Birks. The four steps were expressly endorsed by the House of Lords in Banque Financière de la Cité v Parc (Battersea) Ltd in the form of four questions:

- (1) is a defendant enriched or benefited?
- (2) is the enrichment at the claimant's expense?
- (3) is the enrichment unjust?
- (4) are there any defences?

Subsequent case law and academic writing has given greater content to this commonly accepted framework. The application of the formula can be illustrated by Kelly v Solari. In that case, a company paid out a life insurance policy to a widow by mistake. The company brought an action for money had and received against the widow, seeking restitution of the mistaken payment. Analysed in modern language, the widow had been enriched at the company's direct expense. The 'unjust factor' was mistake: the company had conferred the benefit whilst labouring under the incorrect tacit assumption that the payment was due.

=== Controversy over the status of the analytical framework ===
The precise status of this analytic framework and its underpinning concept of unjust enrichment is controversial.

- On the one hand, scholars have sought to provide a coherent, rational and principled structure to an area of law once riddled with legal fiction. They have also sought to avoid the perception that courts are dispensing palm tree justice by engaging in an open-ended consideration of the injustice of the circumstances. To this end, 'unjust enrichment' has been treated as a descriptive, taxonomical term with precise legal content: it does not invite some broad, discretionary examination of what is just or equitable on the facts of the case. The framework is treated as conclusive of liability, producing a clear answer to whether a defendant is obliged to give restitution of a benefit acquired at another's expense.
- On the other hand, some have suggested that the framework has too much of a 'broad-brush or legislative flavour'. The UK Supreme Court recently referred to the framework as 'broad headings for ease of exposition' and emphasised that they do not have 'statutory force'. This debate about the precise content of 'unjust enrichment' and the utility of a strict theoretical framework is closely tied to jurisprudential debates about the role of conscience and Equity in a modern system of law. Unjust enrichment has been a key battleground for the so-called 'fusion wars'.

As a matter of day-to-day practice, it is this framework which is routinely applied as the organising structure for the law. Nevertheless, practitioners frequently plead claims by reference to the old common counts. It is not yet possible to articulate the law without reference to these old categories. Whether it is desirable to do so remains a controversial question.

=== Enrichment ===
The first element of a claim is that a defendant is enriched. This requirement distinguishes a claim in unjust enrichment from a claim in tort: the law of unjust enrichment is not concerned with compensation for loss, but rather with the restitution of gains.

Historically, the nature of one's claim differed depending upon the nature of the enrichment. For example, if the defendant had received money, the plaintiff would bring an action for money had and received. If the plaintiff had discharged a liability of the defendant by paying money to a third party, the plaintiff would bring an action for money paid to the defendant's use. If instead the defendant had received services or goods, the plaintiff would recover bring a quantum meruit or a quantum valebat, respectively. These were claims for the reasonable value of the services or goods. It is no longer necessary to plead one's form of action. Whilst lawyers often draft their claims by reference to this language, academic commentators tend to analyse the law without regard to such historical distinctions. In short, an 'enrichment' for the purposes of the modern law may include, amongst other things: (i) money; (ii) services; (iii) chattels; and (iv) the discharge of a liability to a third party.

Whether a defendant has been enriched (and the proper valuation thereof) is determined objectively. Nevertheless, the law does take account of the defendant's autonomy. This is through the notion of 'subjective devaluation'. In effect, a defendant is entitled to say 'I do not value the benefit as much as you claim I do' or even 'I did not want that benefit at all; to me it is worthless'. The law respects this argument because it protects individual autonomy. The law nevertheless 'looks for its limitations and curbs its excesses'. A plaintiff can overcome subjective devaluation by demonstrating:

- (i) that the defendant requested the benefit; or
- (ii) that the enrichment is an incontrovertible benefit; or
- (iii) that the defendant has freely accepted the benefit.

The principles relating to enrichment can be illustrated by the following cases.

- In McDonald v Coys of Kensington (Sales) Ltd, Mr McDonald purchased a Mercedes for £20,290 but was mistakenly also given a personalised number plate worth £15,000. By the time anyone realised, the plate had been registered in his name. He was therefore entitled to it under statute. The claimants (assignees of the original owners) sought restitution. Was Mr McDonald 'enriched' by receipt of a number plate personalised for another? The Court held that the benefit was an incontrovertible benefit - that is, a benefit that no reasonable person in the defendant's position would deny. The reason was that 'justice requires that a person, who ... has a benefit or the right to a benefit for which he knows that he has not bargained or paid, should reimburse the value ... if it is readily returnable without substantial difficulty or detriment and he chooses to retain it'. That is, Mr McDonald's refusal to return the number plate suggested that he did sufficiently value the benefit, particularly when it was easily returnable.
- In Sempra Metals Ltd v IRC a company paid too much advance corporation tax to the public revenue. But for this mistake of law, the payment would have been deferred to a later time. The company sought recovery of the money with compound interest. Had the public revenue been 'enriched' by its early receipt of the money? The House of Lords held that compound interest was available. The question then become one of valuing the claim. The majority held that the enrichment was the opportunity to use the money: the public revenue had effectively received a loan. The decision illustrates that one can bring a claim in respect of the 'use value' of money.
- In Exall v Partridge, Mr Exall left his carriage on Mr Partridge's property for repair. Partridge's landlord later seized Partridge's coachbuilding shop and the property inside, including Exall's carriage. In order to end the distress, Exall paid the rent, discharging Partridge's liability to his landlord. Exall then brought an action for money paid to the defendant's use. The Court of King's Bench held that the money could be recovered. Grose J said 'the law implies a promise by the three defendants to repay'. The law now recognises that the implication of a request by Partridge and a promise to pay Exall for the benefit (namely, the discharge of the liability) is fictitious. The case illustrates that one's discharge of a liability of another can constitute an 'enrichment' for the purposes of the law of unjust enrichment. In modern language, this was a claim for recoupment. Whether the principle underlying recoupment and contribution is 'unjust enrichment' remains a controversial question.
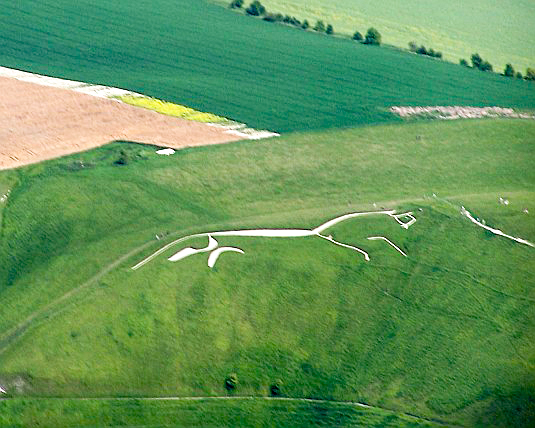
  Rowe v Vale of White Horse DC, held that receiving sewerage services was an "incontrovertible benefit".

=== At the expense of another ===
The enrichment must have come at the 'expense' of the claimant. There are two particularly difficult issues:

- Must the enrichment come directly from the claimant? Recent case law suggests that English law is moving away from a strict requirement that the enrichment come directly from the claimant. For example, courts have been willing to turn their attention to questions of causation and the 'economic reality' of the transaction, in lieu of strict directness.
- Must there be correspondence between the claimant's loss and the defendant's gain? Courts have generally adopted the view that there need not be complete 'equivalence' between loss and gain, provided there is a causal connection. This issue is related to the question whether there should be a 'passing on' defence: that is, whether a claimant should be able to recover from the defendant despite the claimant having 'passed on' the loss to third parties. There is no such defence in England, Australia or Canada, although there are some statutory provisions providing for such a defence in each jurisdiction.

The requirement that the enrichment be 'at the claimant's expense' distinguishes restitution for unjust enrichment from restitution for wrongs. In the former case, there must be a subtraction from the wealth of the claimant, at least in a notional sense. In the latter, there is no such requirement. For example, where a fiduciary receives a benefit in breach of the 'no profit' rule, the defaulting fiduciary will hold that property on constructive trust for the principal. In such a case, the principal will have a direct (proprietary) claim against the fiduciary to recover the benefit. It does not matter that the principal (claimant) had no prior proprietary interest in the benefit, nor even that the benefit would never have otherwise been received by the principal.

=== In circumstances which are 'unjust' ===
In the eyes of the law, there is nothing objectionable about being enriched at the expense of another. But the law will intervene when such enrichment is 'unjust'. The question of injustice is not at large. English law adopts an 'unjust factor' approach to the law of restitution for unjust enrichment. This means that a claimant must plead by reference to the various factors that the law recognises as 'unjust'.

In contrast to the English approach, most civil law jurisdictions adopt an 'absence of basis' analysis. On this view, a defendant's enrichment is 'unjustified' where there is no 'basis' for the defendant's receipt. An example of a 'basis' is where a defendant receives a benefit under a valid and subsisting contract. The difference is more than mere conceptual or semantic emphasis. Nevertheless, in the vast majority of cases, the outcome will be the same whether an 'unjust factor' or an 'absence of basis' approach is adopted.

English cases featuring general discussion on the question of injustice include:

- Kleinwort Benson Ltd v Lincoln City Council [1999] 2 AC 349
- Woolwich v IRC [1993] AC 70
- Test Claimants in the FII Group Litigation v HMRC [2012] UKSC 19, [2012] Bus LR 1033 [162]
- Deutsche Morgan Grenfell Group plc v IRC [2006] UKHL 49

=== Defences ===
Establishing that a defendant has received a benefit at the expense of the claimant in circumstances which are unjust gives rise to a prima facie right to restitution. In most cases, this is typically a personal right to the money value of the benefit conferred. Liability is strict: there is no need to prove any wrongdoing on the part of the defendant.

The question then becomes whether there is a relevant bar or whether the defendant has a valid defence. Defences to restitutionary claims is a broader topic than defences to actions in unjust enrichment. Examples of defences or bars to restitutionary claims include:

- Change of position;
- Passing on;
- Estoppel;
- Bona fide purchase for value without notice;
- Limitation periods;
- Ministerial receipt;
- Receipt under a valid contractual or statutory obligation; and
- Lack of clean hands.

Not all these defences are available to all restitutionary claims. The availability of a defence may turn on: whether a restitutionary claim is legal or equitable; whether a claim is for a personal or proprietary remedy; and whether the claim is brought under national or EU law.

== Unjust factors ==
Outlined below are the 'unjust factors' which have been recognised (or proposed) within the English law of unjust enrichment. Some of these doctrines feature in the law of contract, where they are termed 'vitiating factors'. The applicable principles are not always the same, however.

=== Failure of consideration ===
Where one person pays money to another for a consideration which wholly fails, he or she may be entitled to restitution on the ground of total failure of consideration. Academic writing typically refers to this ground as "failure of basis".

==== Meaning of consideration ====
"Consideration" in this context does not bear its contractual meaning. This can be a particular source of confusion, given that the ground of restitution known as "failure of consideration" typically arises in contractual contexts.

- In its narrow and most commonly encountered sense, consideration refers to the failure of the condition on which a benefit was conferred.
- In its broader sense, consideration refers to the failure of a legal or factual state of affairs which has failed to materialise or subsist.

==== The total failure rule ====
The orthodox rule is that the failure of consideration must be total. This means that the claimant must not have received any part of the bargained-for counter-performance; or, more accurately, that the defendant must not have commenced rendering performance. The total failure rule has been subject to persistent academic criticism. It is subject to several qualifications. In such cases, the claimant may still be entitled to restitution. Examples include:

- Where, properly construed, the benefit received by the defendant did not form part of the bargained-for counter-performance;
- Where the claimant has only received an "incidental" benefit;
- Where the claimant has a legal right to reject the benefit and return it in specie;
- Where there has been a total failure in relation to a severable part.

==== Claims in respect of non-money benefits ====
The ground of restitution known as total failure of developed within the action for money had and received. That action was only available in respect of money claims. Where the claimant conferred a non-money benefit upon a defendant, the correct form of action was a quantum meruit (services) or quantum valebat (goods). It is tolerably clear that failure of consideration can now apply to non-money claims.

==== Taxonomy ====
Failure of consideration typically arises where a contract is "ineffective". This is not a term of art, but rather a useful tool for exposition. A contract may be ineffective for a number of reasons. Failure of consideration may arise:

- Where a contract is discharged for breach or repudiation by the claimant or defendant;
- Where a contract is unenforceable for want of compliance with the relevant formalities;
- Where a contract is discharged by frustration;
- Where a contract is rescinded due to a vitiating factor (e.g., mistake; undue influence);
- Where a contract is void ab initio.

=== Mistake ===
A benefit conferred upon another whilst labouring under a qualifying mistake gives rise to a prima facie claim for restitution of the benefit. Where one person pays money to another whilst labouring under a causative mistake of fact or law, he or she may be entitled to restitution on the ground of mistake. Restitution for a mistaken payment is widely regarded as the paradigm case of restitution for unjust enrichment.

==== Background ====
Historically, the law took a highly restrictive approach to recovery for mistake. First, the law only recognised mistakes which related to a matter of fact, rather than law. This rule was judicially abandoned in 1999. Secondly, the mistake had to be a "supposed liability" mistake. This meant that the claimant must have laboured under the belief that he or she was under a legal obligation to pay. This rule has also been abandoned, though the implications of this remain unsettled.

==== Claims in respect of non-money benefits ====
The prevailing academic view (for which there is some support in the cases) is that mistake can be a ground of restitution for services.

=== Misrepresentation ===
- Erlanger v New Sombrero Phosphate Co (1878) 3 App Cas 1218, on misrepresentation

=== Ignorance ===
- Common law strict liability subject to defences
- Holiday v Sigil
- Banque Belge pour L'Etranger v Hambrouck
- Agip (Africa) Ltd v Jackson
- Equity, knowing receipt and dealing
- Carl-Zess Stiftung v Herbert Smith & Co (No 2), dishonesty required
- Re Montagu's Settlement Trusts
- Belmont Finance Corp v Williams Furniture Ltd (No 2), negligence also held to be sufficient
- BCCI (Overseas) Ltd v Akindele, unconscionability as the test
- Re Diplock, strict liability subject to defences as an exception

=== Undue influence and exploitation ===
- Relational undue influence
- Allcard v Skinner (1887) 36 Ch D 145
- The role of unconscionable conduct
- Exploitation of the mental inadequacy of the claimant
- Exploitation of the economic weakness of the claimant
- Exploitation of the difficult circumstances of the claimant
- Illegality to protect vulnerable persons from exploitation

=== Legal compulsion ===
Legal compulsion is a proposed ground of restitution. It is said to explain the law relating to recoupment and contribution.

- Recoupment. Where one person discharges the debt of another, he or she may be able to sue the debtor and thereby recoup the loss. Historically, this was a quasi-contractual action known as an action for money paid, laid out and expended to the defendant's use.
- Contribution. Where two persons bear a co-ordinate liability, they must share the burden pro rata. For example, where A and B are both under a common liability to pay C, and A pays this debt, A can claim contribution from C. Historically, this would be a suit in Chancery (or in the Exchequer) and is accordingly an equitable claim. Some rights of contribution are now governed by statute.

Whether such claims are capable of being rationalised on the ground of unjust enrichment remains a controversial question.

=== Illegality ===
- Lipkin Gorman v Karpnale Ltd

=== Incapacity ===
- Companies Act 2006 ss 39-40
- Gibb v Maidstone and Tunbridge Wells NHS Trust [2010] EWCA Civ 678 [26]-[27] held an NHS trust had not acted ultra vires so that a £250k payment to a former chief executive could not be recovered as being irrationally overpaid.
- Hazell v Hammersmith and Fulham LBC [1992] 2 AC 1. Banks paid councils a lump sum (for Islington, £2.5m). The councils then paid the banks back at the prevailing interest rate. Banks paid councils back a fixed interest rate (this is the swap part). The point was that councils were gambling on what interest rates would do. So if interest rates fell, the councils would win. As it happened, interest rates were going up and the banks were winning. Islington was due to pay £1,354,474, but after Hazell, it refused, and waited to see what the courts said. At first instance Hobhouse J said that because the contract for the swap scheme was void, the council had been unjustly enriched with the lump sum (£2.5m) and it should have to pay compound interest (lots) rather than simple interest (lots, but not so much). But luckily for local government, three law Lords held that Islington only needed to repay with simple interest. There was no jurisdiction for compound interest. They said this was because there was no ‘resulting trust’.
- Westdeutsche Landesbank Girozentrale v Islington LBC [1996] AC 669, the council had no authority to enter into a complex swap transaction with the German bank. So the House of Lords held that the council should repay the money they had been lent and a hitherto unknown ‘unjust’ factor was added to the list. Birks argued that the better explanation in all cases is an ‘absence of basis’ for the transfer of property. Searching through or adding to a list of open ended unjust factors simply concludes on grounds of what one wishes to prove, grounds that ‘would have to be constantly massaged to ensure that they dictated an answer as stable as is reached by the shorter ‘non basis’ route.’ (Birks (2005) 113)
- Banque Financiere de la Cite v. Parc (Battersea) Ltd [1999] 1 AC 221
- Deutsche Morgan Grenfell plc v IRC [2006] UKHL 49 at [26] Money was paid as tax under a statutory regime, which the ECJ later held to have infringed the EC Treaty. The House of Lords held that a claim could be made on grounds of a ‘mistake as to the law’. Professor Charles Mitchell prefers the reasoning of Park J at first instance, which recognised that there is not really a ‘mistake’ in terms of an ‘impairment of a claimant's actual thought processes’. Lord Hoffmann recognised it only implicitly at [32].

== Remedy: personal and proprietary restitution ==
If a claimant can establish that the defendant has been enriched at the claimant's expense in circumstances which are unjust, the claimant has a prima facie right to restitution. The question then becomes whether the claimant is entitled to a personal or a proprietary remedy.

Historically, the indebitatus counts only afforded a personal remedy. Hence where the claimant's action would have been brought as an action for money had and received, for money paid, or as a quantum meruit or quantum valebat, the claimant is only entitled to a money award. In short, an action for restitution of unjust enrichment only generates a personal liability: the claimant has no proprietary interest in any specific asset of the defendant.

Academic writers have sought to expand the explanatory power of 'unjust enrichment'. They have suggested that the doctrine of subrogation forms part of the law of unjust enrichment. If correct, this would be an instance of unjust enrichment generating a proprietary remedy. English courts have since accepted that the concept of unjust enrichment has a role to play in subrogation. The English approach has been stridently rejected by the High Court of Australia.

Academic writers such as Professor Birks and Professor Burrows have argued that claims to the traceable substitute of one's property are claims in unjust enrichment. This view has been rejected by the House of Lords. They instead held that such claims were a matter of vindicating property rights, a view long associated with Professor Virgo. Even if not (for the foreseeable future) a part of the law of unjust enrichment, a claim to the traceable proceeds of one's property remains part of the law of restitution. The remainder of this section concerns proprietary restitution. Proprietary restitution is where a claimant who is entitled to restitution is awarded a proprietary remedy.

Tracing at common law

- Taylor v Plumer
- Banque Belge pour L'Etranger v Hambrouck
- Agip (Africa) Ltd v Jackson
- Lipkin Gorman v Karpnale Ltd
- Trustee of the Property of FC Jones and Sons v Jones

Tracing in equity

- Sinclair v Brougham
- Re Diplock [1948] Ch 465, 533, 534, and 539
- Barlow Clowes International Ltd v Vaughan [1992] 4 All ER 22
- Re Hallett's Estate (1880) 13 Ch D 696, 727
- Re Oatway [1903] 2 Ch 356, 360
- Re Tilley's Will Trusts
- Foskett v McKeown [2001] 1 AC 102, 127-8
- James Roscoe (Bolton) Ltd v Winder [1915] 1 Ch 62
- Re Goldcorp Exchange Ltd
- Bishopsgate Investment Management Ltd v Homan

Proprietary restitution

- Chase Manhattan Bank NA v Israel-British Bank (London) Ltd
- Lord Napier and Ettrick v Hunter
- Boscawen v Bajwa
- Westdeutsche Landesbank Girozentrale v Islington LBC

Following

- Jones v De Marchant (1916) 28 DLR 561

Tracing

- Shalson v Russo [2003] EWHC 1637 (Ch), [2005] Ch 281 [144]
- Turner v Jacob [2006] EWHC 1317 (Ch), [2008] WTLR 307 [100]-[102]

Mixing two claimants' money or money mixed with an innocent claimant

- Clayton's case (1816) 1 Mer 529
- Russell-Cooke Trust Co v Prentis [2002] EWHC 2227 (Ch), [2003] 2 All ER 478 [55]
- Commerzbank AG v IMB Morgan plc [2004] EWHC 2771 (Ch), [2005] 1 Lloyd's Rep 198

Backwards tracing

- Bishopsgate Investment Management Ltd v Homan [1994] 3 WLR 1270, 1274 and 1279
- Law Society v Haider [2003] EWHC 2486 (Ch) [40]-[41]
- M Conaglen ‘Difficulties with Tracing Backwards’ (2011) 127 LQR 432

Swollen assets theory

- Space Investments Ltd v CIBC (Bahamas) Ltd [1986] 1 WLR 1072
- Serious Fraud Office v Lexi Holdings plc [2008] EWCA Crim 1443, [2009] QB 376 [46]-[58]

== Defences ==
=== Change of position ===
- Lipkin Gorman v Karpnale Ltd
- Philip Collins Ltd v Davis [2000] 3 All ER 808
- Scottish Equitable plc v Derby
- Commerzbank AG v Gareth Price-Jones
- Dextra Bank and Trust Co Ltd v Bank of Jamaica
- Niru Battery Manufacturing Co v Milestone Trading Ltd
- Barros Mattos Junior v Macdaniels Ltd
- RBC Dominion Securities Inc v Dawson

=== Estoppel ===
- Avon CC v Howlett
- Scottish Equitable plc v Derby
- National Westminster Bank plc v Somer International (UK) Ltd

=== Bona Fide Purchaser ===
It means that good value is given for receipt of assets without notice of breach of trust. It is a complete defence to any knowing receipt claim.

- Miller v Race
- Dextra Bank & Trust Co Ltd v Bank of Jamaica

=== Agency ===
Another available defence is ministerial receipt, i.e. the recipient defendant receives the assets as agent for another.

- Australia and New Zealand Banking Group Ltd v Westpac Banking Corporation
- Portman Building Society v Hamlyn Taylor Neck

=== Counter restitution impossible ===
In circumstances where one party is claiming recovery of the benefits the other party has unjustly obtained ("restitution"), counter restitution refers to the obligation of the party claiming recovery to repay any benefits they themselves have obtained. Where this party has obtained benefits which cannot be repaid, and therefore counter restitution is impossible, then their claim for recovery of benefits will be barred.

- Clarke v Dickson
- Armstrong v Jackson
- Spence v Crawford
- Smith New Court Securities Ltd v Scrimgeour Vickers Ltd
- Mahoney v Purnell

=== Passing on ===
- Kleinwort Benson Ltd v Birmingham CC
- Commissioner of State Revenue v Royal Insurance Australia Ltd

=== Illegality ===
- Oom v Bruce
- Smith v Bromley
- Smith v Cuff
- Parkinson v College of Ambulance Ltd
- Re Cavalier Insurance Co Ltd
- Mohamed v Alaga & Co
- Bowmakers Ltd v Barnet Instruments Ltd
- Tinsley v Milligan
- Tribe v Tribe
- Nelson v Nelson

=== Incapacity ===
- Cowern v Nield
- Stocks v Wilson
- R Leslie Ltd v Sheill
- Minors' Contracts Act 1987 s 3

== See also ==
- The Law of Obligations
  - The English Law of Restitution
  - The English Law of Trusts
  - The English Law of Tort
  - The English Law of Contract
- Prominent academics in the English law of restitution:
  - Robert Goff, Baron Goff of Chieveley
  - Professor Gareth Jones
  - Professor Peter Birks
  - Professor Andrew Burrows
  - Professor Graham Virgo
  - Professor Charles Mitchell
