= Banque Financière de la Cité v Parc (Battersea) Ltd =

Banque Financiere de la Cite v Parc (Battersea) Ltd
- Court: House of Lords
- Citation: [1998] UKHL 7

Court membership
- Judge sitting: Lord Steyn Lord Griffiths Lord Hoffmann Lord Clyde Lord Hutton

Keywords
- Unjust enrichment

Banque Financiere de la Cite v Parc (Battersea) Ltd [1998] UKHL 7 is an English unjust enrichment case, concerning the framework for a claim.

== Facts ==
A company named Parc (Battersea) Ltd had got a loan from a bank called Royal Trust Bank (Switzerland), and given charge over its Battersea land as security. Parc Ltd got a second loan from Omnicorp Overseas Ltd (which was part of the same group, and whose parent was managed by Mr Herzig), which got another charge. Banque Financiere de la Cite, a Swiss bank, gave Parc Ltd a third loan of DM30million but got no charge. Instead it got a ‘postponement letter’ saying other companies in the group (including OOL) would not enforce their charges until BFC had been paid. Parc Ltd used the loan to pay off RTB. But OOL had given no authority to Parc Ltd to give that letter. Parc Ltd went insolvent. BFC claimed subrogation to be paid in priority of OOL, but OOL contested.

== Judgment ==
The House of Lords held that BFC should be subrogated in priority to OOL, because this was the ultimate intention of the letter, and otherwise OOL would be unjustly enriched by the advance of the loan.

Lord Hoffmann gave the leading speech and said that it is now:

. . . a mistake to regard the availability of subrogation as a remedy to prevent unjust enrichment as turning entirely upon the question of intention, whether common or unilateral. Such an analysis has inevitably to be propped up by presumptions which can verge on outright fictions, more appropriate to a less developed legal system than we now have . . . [Outside of cases where the parties have contracted for subrogation, it] should be recognised that one is here concerned with a restitutionary remedy and that the appropriate questions are therefore, first, whether the defendant would be enriched at the plaintiff’s expense; secondly, whether such enrichment would be unjust; and, thirdly, whether there are nevertheless reasons of policy for denying a remedy.

Lord Hoffmann said the following on the principles behind liability in unjust enrichment.

... there is, so far as I know, no case in which it has been held that carelessness is a ground for holding that a consequent enrichment is not unjust. No doubt Mr. Mynors (in Chetwynd v. Allen [1899] 1 Ch. 353 ) and Mr. Butler (in Butler v. Rice [1910] 2 Ch. 277 ) were careless in parting with their money without bothering to inspect the borrower's title deeds. They relied upon Mr. Chetwynd and Mr. Rice as B.F.C. relied upon Mr. Herzig. But that did not entitle Mrs. Chetwynd or Mrs. Rice to be enriched as a result of their mistakes.

Lord Steyn said the following.

The starting point is the letter of postponement, Robert Walker J. (now Robert Walker L.J.) found that it was not binding on Parc or OOL Although they were "companies of our group" within the meaning of the letter Parc and OOL were not bound by its terms either by agency or estoppel. But Robert Walker J. concluded that properly construed the letter of postponement was intended to be directly binding on all companies in the Omni Group. The Court of Appeal came to the opposite conclusion. Morritt L.J. held that the agreement expressed in the postponement letter was intended to be that of Holding alone. This interpretation does not involve an undertaking on the part of Holding to procure the consent of companies in the group: it takes effect as a warranty by Holding. Morritt L.J. relied strongly on the fact that companies in the group were neither consulted nor informed of the letter. Given Mr. Rey's dominance and control of the Omni Group I do not attach much weight to this factor. The letter was badly drafted, and it is certainly capable of more than one interpretation. But ultimately I take the same view as the judge. The context is important. The letter was requested by BFC, and tendered by Mr. Herzig, as a form of security albeit not security involving rights in rem. Moreover, the letter shows that BFC wanted security not from Parc but in respect of intra-group indebtedness. The letter was the result of a negotiation between commercial men. In my view the commercial construction is one that treats the letter as intended to give effective protection in respect of all companies in the group, i.e. it was intended to be directly binding on all companies in the group. And I am reinforced in this view by the fact that Robert Walker J., who was steeped in the realities of the context of the letter, ultimately favoured it. From this conclusion it follows that the expectation of BFC was that the letter of postponement effectively protected BFC against loans granted by group companies to Parc. In the result that expectation has not been fulfilled. In any event, the important point is that BFC would not have lent had it not mistakenly believed that its priority in respect of intra-group indebtedness was secured effectively against subsidiaries of the group.

My Lords, both the judge and Morritt L.J. invoked the vocabulary of unjust enrichment or restitution. Nevertheless both courts ultimately treated the question at stake as being whether BFC is entitled to be subrogated to the rights of RTB. On the present appeal counsel adopted a similar approach. That position may have seemed natural at a stage when BFC apparently claimed to be entitled to step in the shoes of RTB as chargee with the usual proprietary remedies. On appeal to your Lordships' House counsel for BFC attenuated his submission by making clear that BFC only seeks a restitutionary remedy against OOL. In these circumstances it seems sensible to consider directly whether the grant of the remedy would be consistent with established principles of unjust enrichment. OOL committed no wrong: it cannot therefore be a case of unjust enrichment by wrongdoing. If it is a case of unjust enrichment, it must in the vivid terminology of Prof. Peter Birks be unjust enrichment by subtraction. If the case is approached in this way it follows that BFC is either entitled to a restitutionary remedy or it is not so entitled. After all, unjust enrichment ranks next to contract and tort as part of the law of obligations. It is an independent source of rights and obligations.

Four questions arise: (1) Has OOL benefited or been enriched? (2) Was the enrichment at the expense of BFC? (3) Was the enrichment unjust? (4) Are there any defences? The first requirement is satisfied: the repayment of £10m. of the loan pro tanto improved OOL's position as chargee. That is conceded. The second requirement was in dispute. Stripped to its essentials the argument of counsel for OOL was that the interposition of the loan to Mr. Herzig meant that the enrichment of OOL was at the expense of Mr. Herzig. The loan to Mr. Herzig was a genuine one spurred on by the motive of avoiding Swiss regulatory requirements. But it was nevertheless no more than a formal act designed to allow the transaction to proceed. It does not alter the reality that OOL was enriched by the money advanced by BFC via Mr. Herzig to Parc. To allow the interposition of Mr. Herzig to alter the substance of the transaction would be pure formalism.

That brings me to the third requirement, which was the ground upon which the Court of Appeal decided against BFC. Since no special defences were relied on, this was also the major terrain of debate on the present appeal. It is not seriously disputed that by asking for a letter of postponement BFC expected that they would obtain a form of security sufficient to postpone repayment of loans by all companies in the Omni groups until repayment of the BFC loan. In any event, that fact is clearly established. But for BFC's mistaken belief that it was protected in respect of intra-group indebtedness BFC would not have proceeded with the refinancing. In these circumstances there is in my judgment a principled ground for granting a restitutionary remedy.

Counsel for OOL challenged the view that restitutionary liability is prima facie established by submitting that there was no mutual intention that BFC should have priority as against OOL. Restitutionary liability is triggered by a range of unjust factors or grounds of restitution. Defeated bilateral expectations are a prime source of such liability. But sometimes unilateral defeated expectations may be sufficient, e.g. payments made under a unilateral mistake of fact where the ground of liability is the mistake of one party. I would reject the idea that in a case such as the present a test of mutuality must be satisfied.

It is now necessary to mention the other factors which the Court of Appeal relied on in concluding that BFC was not entitled to succeed. Perhaps in passing Morritt L.J. commented that neither Parc nor OOL was guilty of any misrepresentation. It is sufficient to say that restitution is not a fault-based remedy. Morritt L.J. then pointed out that BFC failed to take elementary precautions to safeguard their interests. Counsel for OOL conceded that this feature is not a self-sufficient answer to the claim. At one stage he argued that this feature is relevant to the exercise of a discretion but I understood him ultimately to concede that the relief sought is not discretionary. In any event, the neglect of BFC is akin to the carelessness of a mistaken payor: it does not by itself undermine the ground of restitution.

Lord Griffiths concurred.

Lord Clyde agreed, saying the claim was based in unjust enrichment, or nemo debet locupletari aliena jactura. Lord Hutton also concurred.

== See also ==
- English unjust enrichment law
