= Kingstreet Investments Ltd v New Brunswick (Finance) =

- Court: Supreme Court
- Citation: [2007] SCC 1, [2007] 1 SCR 3

Court membership
- Judges sitting: McLachlin CJ, Bastarache, Binnie, LeBel, Deschamps, Fish, Abella, Charron and Rothstein JJ

Keywords
- Expense of the claimant

Kingstreet Investments Ltd v New Brunswick [2007] 1 SCR 3 is a Canadian unjust enrichment case, concerning to what extent enrichment of the defendant must be at the expense of the claimant.

== Facts ==
Kingstreet Investments ran licensed nightclubs in New Brunswick. They bought alcohol from provincial retailers, paying a user charge on top of the retail price as regulation prescribed. They claimed the user charge was unconstitutional and sought relief with compound interest.

The Queen's Bench held the user charge was an unconstitutional indirect tax, but denied recovery because Kingstreet had passed the burden on in increased prices. There was a passing on defence. Moreover, ultra vires taxes cannot generally be recovered. Robertson JA for the Court of Appeal held by a majority that restitution should be made for money from the time of legal proceedings, as that was the start of the protest. Before then, the passing on defence applied.

== Judgment ==
Bastarache J for the Supreme Court, because unjust enrichment principles are ill-suited to determine constitutional issues of ultra vires taxes, that is the wrong approach. There should be a remedy as of constitutional right. When governments collect taxes ultra vires it undermines the rule of law. So there must be a right to restitution. Parliament can prevent fiscal chaos by suspending declarations of invalidity and enacting valid taxes and applying them retroactively. The passing on defence is inconsistent with restitution law, it confuses compensation matters, and is not concerned with the possibility that the claimant may receive a windfall. It is economically misconceived and creates difficulties of proof. There is no need to consider the counter arguments to passing on, of protest and compulsion. The six year limitation in the New Brunswick Limitation of Actions Act s 9 applied. There was no right to compound interest, which might be warranted to express a moral sanction.

44. There are three major criticisms of the passing-on defence: first, that it is inconsistent with the basic premise of restitution law; second, that it is economically misconceived; and third, that the task of determining the ultimate location of the burden of a tax is exceedingly difficult and constitutes an inappropriate basis for denying relief.

45. The defence of passing on has developed almost exclusively in the context of recovery of taxes and other charges paid under a mistake of law...

46. [Quoting Brennan J in the Australian Royal Insurance case...] The fact that Royal had passed on to its policy holders the burden of the payments made to the Commissioner does not mean that Royal did not pay its own money to the Commissioner. The passing on of the burden of the payments made does not affect the situation that, as between the Commissioner and Royal, the former was enriched at the expense of the latter...

48. Unless the elasticity of demand is very low, the plaintiff is bound to suffer a loss, either because of reduced sales or because of reduced profit per sale. Where elasticity is low, and it can be demonstrated that the tax was passed on through higher prices that did not affect profits per sale or the volume of sales, it would be impossible to demonstrate that the plaintiff could not or would not have raised its prices had the tax not been imposed, thereby increasing its profits even further. LeBel J. referred to these various figures as "virtually unascertainable" (para. 205, citing White J. in Hanover Shoe, Inc. v. United Shoe Machinery Corp., 392 U.S. 481 (1968), at p. 493). LeBel J. ultimately concluded that "[t]he passing on defence would, in effect, result in an argument that no damages are ever recoverable in commercial litigation because anyone who claimed to have suffered damages but was still solvent had obviously found a way to pass the loss on" (para. 206, citing Ground J. in Law Society of Upper Canada v. Ernst & Young 2002 CanLII 49466 (ON SC), (2002), 59 O.R. (3d) 214 (S.C.J.), at para. 40).

49. ...unlike restitution law, tort law is premised on the concept of compensation for loss, such that concerns about potential windfalls are appropriate.

== See also ==
- English unjust enrichment law
