= Test Claimants in the Franked Investment Income Group Litigation v IRC =

English unjust enrichment and tax case

- Court: Supreme Court
- Full case name: Test Claimants in the Franked Investment Income Group Litigation (Appellants) v Commissioners of Inland Revenue and another (Respondents)
- Citation: [2012] UKSC 19

Case history
- Prior action: [2010] EWCA Civ 103, [2010] STC 1251

Keywords
- Expense of the claimant

Test Claimants in the Franked Investment Income Group Litigation v IRC [2012] UKSC 19 is an English unjust enrichment law case, concerning liability for overpaid tax, and limitation of claims. The Supreme Court made a reference to the European Court of Justice (ECJ).

== Facts ==
Companies in two UK groups, with overseas subsidiaries, claimed restitution of advance corporation tax that was in place from 1973 to 1999, now in section 18 of the Income and Corporation Taxes Act 1988. It treated dividends received by UK resident companies from non-resident subsidiaries differently to dividends paid and received within wholly UK groups. This was contrary to EU law, specifically TEC art 43 on freedom of establishment and TEC art 56 on free movement of capital, and the ECJ said there had to be an effective remedy. Woolwich v IRC had established that recovery of unlawfully exacted tax could be made. The test claimant argued that section 32(1)(c) of the Limitation Act 1980 allowed extended periods for bringing actions based on mistake, starting from the date of the discovery, and the only point for discovery was the ECJ judgment on 8 March 2001. They started proceedings on 8 September 2003, and the same day the Revenue announced legislation to disapply section 32(1)(c), which came in as the Finance Act 2004, section 320. Also, when the House of Lords judgment of 2006 confirmed a right to claim tax paid under a mistake, Parliament passed the Finance Act 2007 section 107, which disapplied section 32(1)(c) for proceedings brought before 8 September 2003. They used tax relief to reduce liability to pay tax. The tax was unlawful under EU law. The FII Group claimed the money back. It said it would have used the tax relief to reduce other lawful tax liabilities, if it had not already been used to pay the unlawful tax.

== Judgment ==
=== High Court ===
In the High Court, Henderson J held that a claim under the Woolwich principle was not an effective remedy, and the EU precluded sections 320 (FA2004) and 107 (FA2007). He used the directness test of causation.

=== Court of Appeal ===
The Court of Appeal held that the Woolwich remedy was sufficient and EU did not affect section 320 and 107. LA 1980 s 32(1)(c) did not extend to Woolwich claims and so claims within the 1970 Act s 33 needed to go before the Special Commissioners, not the High Court. HMRC was not unjustly enriched by a payment to discharge a tax liability because the tax liability must have been due under the statute. Even if HMRC was enriched by the value of the claimant's forgone tax relief credits, and even if the gain would not have been made but for the claimant's use of the relief, HMRC did not gain at the FII Group's expense. That would be too remote a consequence of the FII Group's earlier use of the reliefs.

=== Supreme Court ===
The Supreme Court held that the FII Group could not recover the majority of overpaid money because the extended limitation period for mistake claims was inapplicable, rather than a claim because of an unlawful demand. But it also allowed a reference to the European Court of Justice on the question of further sums. English law did allow recovery of unlawfully demanded taxes after Woolwich. A separate action was for a mistake of law, including tax paid in ignorance of incompatibility with EU law. The Limitation Act 1980 section 32(1)(c) extended limitations for relief of consequences of a mistake, and required that a mistake led to the claim. This did not extend to restitution for unlawfully demanded tax under the Woolwich principle. The FII Group were claiming under Woolwich but had not been able to bring their claim in time, subject to statutory relief under the Taxes Management Act 1970 section 33.

TMA s 33 did not expressly exclude other causes of action at common law, and it could not be implied because that would be inconsistent with EU law. Recovery in restitution was not precluded. Any right of restitution was dependent on an additional domestic law right being protected by EU law. A reference was made to the ECJ asking whether section 320 and 107 offended against the principles of effectiveness, legal certainty or legitimate expectations. Specifically the questions were: (1) did EU principles require the benefit of any special advantage in a limitation; and (2) did section 320 offend those principles? It was clear that section 107 did offend the principles, because it cancelled the claims already brought more than three years after legislation was announced precluding recovery, but excluding claims that had already been brought.

== Significance ==
The case could result in the UK government having to pay billions, potentially hundreds of billions, of pounds to corporations.

== See also ==
- English unjust enrichment law
