= Philip Collins Ltd v Davis =

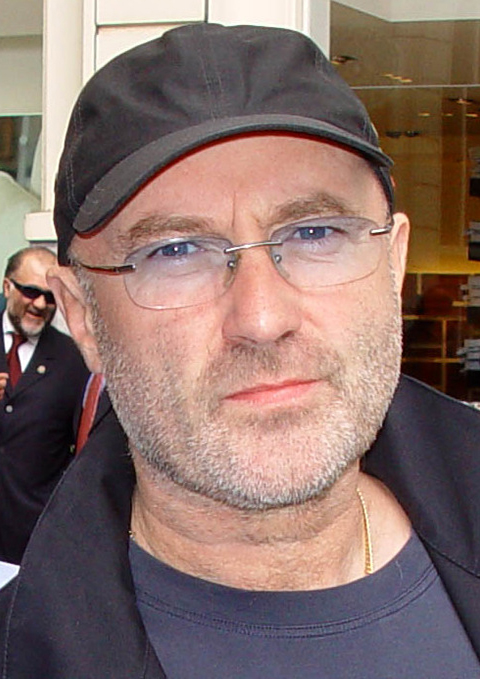
- Court: High Court
- Citation: [2000] 3 All ER 808

Case opinions
- Jonathan Parker J

Keywords
- Unjust enrichment, change of position

Philip Collins Ltd v Davis [2000] 3 All ER 808 is an English unjust enrichment case, an example of a restitution claim and the change of position defence.

== Facts ==
Phil Collins released Serious Hits… Live! with 15 tracks in 1990. Rahmlee Davis and Louis Satterfield contributed performances on five tracks and received album royalties via Collins' publishing company Philip Collins Ltd. In 1997, Collins said they had been mistakenly overpaid by a factor of three. They had been paid as if they had performed on all fifteen tracks, but they had only performed on five. To reverse this alleged unjust enrichment, Collins proposed to set off the overpaid royalties on future royalties. Davis and Satterfield argued back they were entitled to royalties without the pro rata reduction, and raised both estoppel and change of position defences.

== Judgment ==
Jonathan Parker J held Collins had overpaid Davis and Satterfield and he was entitled to set future royalties off against half of the sums overpaid. He said the overpayment was a mistake of fact, because Collins thought they had played in all 15 tracks. Collins was not estopped from maintaining there was overpayment of royalties because there was never any assumption between the parties that Davis and Satterfield would get royalties for all 15 tracks and there was no acquiescence in the assumption. Overpayment was not acquiescence. There was no evidence Davis and Satterfield ever thought they were entitled. The overpayments did not amount to representations that they were (so no estoppel by representation). But the fact of overpayment did result in a general change of position on Davis and Satterfield's part. It increased their level of outgoings. However, the defence of change of position was not an “all or nothing” doctrine and, in this case, it would be fair to allow the defence to cover one half of the overpayments (Lipkin Gorman v Karpnale Ltd [1991] 2 AC 548 applied). Finally, if Collins had made a claim to recover the overpayments his claim would have been statute barred under the Limitation Act 1980, s.5 because it was six years. But here it was not a return of overpayments, only an equitable set off against future royalties.

The following is an excerpt about the change of position defence at work.

The Change Of Position Issue

76 As Mr Howe correctly observed in the course of argument, “change of position” is what this case is really all about.

77 In Lipkin Gorman (above) the House of Lords recognised change of position as a defence to restitutionary claims. In the course of his speech in that case Lord Goff said this (at p. 580c–h):

“I am most anxious that, in recognising this defence to actions of restitution, nothing should be said at this stage to inhibit the development of the defence on a case by case basis, in the usual way. It is, of course, plain that the defence is not open to one who has changed his position in bad faith, as where the defendant has paid away the money with knowledge of the facts entitling the plaintiff to restitution; and it is commonly accepted that the defence should not be open to a wrongdoer. These are matters which can, in due course, be considered in depth in cases where they arise for consideration. They do not arise in the present case. Here there is no doubt that the respondents have acted in good faith throughout, and the action is not founded upon any wrongdoing of the respondents. It is not however appropriate in the present case to attempt to identify all those actions in restitution to which change of position may be a defence. A prominent example will, no doubt, be found in those cases where the plaintiff is seeking repayment of money paid under a mistake of fact; but I can see no reason why the defence should not also be available in principle in a case such as the present, where the plaintiff's money has been paid by a thief to an innocent donee, and the plaintiff then seeks repayment from the donee in an action for money had and received. At present I do not want to state the principle any less broadly than this: that the defence is available to a person whose position has so changed that it would be inequitable in all the circumstances to require him to make restitution, or alternatively to make restitution in full. I wish to stress however that the mere fact that the defendant has spent the money, in whole or in part, does not of itself render it inequitable that he should be called upon to repay, because the expenditure might in any event have been incurred by him in the ordinary course of things. I fear that the mistaken assumption that mere expenditure of money may be regarded as amounting to a change of position for present purposes has led in the past to opposition by some to recognition of a defence which in fact is likely to be available only on comparatively rare occasions.”

Lord Goff went on to emphasise that the defence of change of position will avail a defendant only to the extent that his position has been changed (see Lipkin Gorman, above, p. 580h).

78 Earlier in his speech in Lipkin Gorman (at p. 578) Lord Goff said this:

“The claim for money had and received is not, as I have previously mentioned, founded upon any wrong committed by the club against the solicitors. But it does not, in my opinion, follow that the court has carte blanche to reject the solicitors' claim simply because it thinks it unfair or unjust in the circumstances to grant recovery. The recovery of money in restitution is not, as a general rule, a matter of discretion for the court. A claim to recover money at common law is made as a matter of right; and even though the underlying principle of recovery is the principle of unjust enrichment, nevertheless, where recovery is denied, it is denied on the basis of legal principle.”

Thus, if recovery of the overpayments is to be denied in the instant case, it must be denied not as a matter of discretion but of legal principle. What, then, are the relevant legal principles, in the context of the instant case?

79 For obvious reasons, it would not be appropriate for me to attempt to set out an exhaustive list of the legal principles applicable to the defence of change of position, but four principles in particular seem to me to be called into play in the instant case.

80 In the first place, the evidential burden is on the defendant to make good the defence of change of position. However, in applying this principle it seems to me that the court should beware of applying too strict a standard. Depending on the circumstances, it may well be unrealistic to expect a defendant to produce conclusive evidence of change of position, given that when he changed his position he can have had no expectation that he might thereafter have to prove that he did so, and the reason why he did so, in a court of law (see the observations of Slade L.J. in Avon County Council v. Howlett (above) at pp. 621–2, and Goff & Jones (above) at p. 827). In the second place, as Lord Goff stressed in the passage from his speech in Lipkin Gorman quoted above, to amount to a change of position there must be something more than mere expenditure of the money sought to be recovered, “because the expenditure might in any event have been incurred … in the ordinary course of things”. In the third place, there must be a causal link between the change of position and the overpayment. In South Tyneside Metropolitan B.C. v. Svenska International plc [1995] 1 All E.R. 545, Clarke J., following Hobhouse J. in Kleinwort Benson Ltd v. South Tyneside MBC [1994] 4 All E.R. 972, held that, as a general principle, the change of position must have occurred after receipt of the overpayment, although in Goff & Jones (above) the correctness of this decision is doubted (see ibid. pp. 822–3). But whether or not a change of position may be anticipatory, it must (as I see it) have been made as a consequence of the receipt of, or (it may be) the prospect of receiving, the money sought to be recovered: in other words it must, on the evidence, be referable in some way to the payment of that money. In the fourth place, as Lord Goff also made clear in his speech in Lipkin Gorman, in contrast to the defence of estoppel the defence of change of position is not an “all or nothing” defence: it is available only to the extent that the change of position renders recovery unjust.

81 With those basic principles in mind, I turn to the facts of the instant case.

82 At the outset, when considering the facts of the instant case, two matters are to be borne in mind. In the first place, the recovery which is sought relates only to the excess payments of royalty, since one third of the sums actually paid was payable in any event. In consequence, any relevant change of position by the defendants must be referable to the receipt of such excess payments (or, it may be, the prospect of receiving such excess payments). In the second place, the fact that the defendants are currently in financial difficulties is not in itself indicative of a relevant change of position on their part. Although that fact might have been relevant in considering whether to order repayment of the sums overpaid, the claimant is not seeking an order which requires the defendants to make any payment to the claimant: as I explained earlier, it seeks only to set off the overpayments against future royalties.

83 In their witness statements, which formed the basis of their oral evidence in chief, the defendants addressed the issue of change of position in unequivocal terms. Mr Davis said this in his witness statement:

“Until the royalty payments were stopped, I had adjusted my day to day life according to the regular payments I had received over such a long period, and had become both accustomed to and dependent upon them. I had a few savings. However, with many different projects underway including a clothing business and my solo career, these were soon exhausted. I had relied on the royalties both for my living expenses and to enable me to carry on working. My elderly mother in Chicago and three dependants as well as my household in Los Angeles had all been supported with these payments. I could no longer financially assist them—indeed, I have had to borrow money from family and friends. Most of this remains unpaid … The unannounced withholding of funds has had a domino effect upon my life since most of my projects were predicated on the existence of these royalties.”

Mr Satterfield said this in his witness statement:

“I was heavily reliant upon these royalty payments. Over the period until they were stopped, I would estimate that on average they represented 80–90 per cent of my total income. I had, and have, no savings, and the money was used for the day to day living expenses of my family and myself. In particular, the payments were invaluable in assisting my wife with medical treatment … I sold my home in Chicago to assist with the care she required … The cutting of the royalty payments could not have come at a worse time. In addition, the stopping of the payments dramatically affected my ability to work. There was still a reasonable demand for me. However, the nature of my work involves a great deal of travel, hotels, etc. There were engagements offered to me which I had to decline because I had no money. The effect is a vicious circle…”

84 Had those factual accounts been true and accurate, they would undoubtedly have provided a strong foundation for a complete defence on grounds of change of position; particularly so in the case of Mr Davis. No doubt the statements were drafted with that very consideration in mind. In the event, however, the passages in the defendants' witness statements dealing with the question of change of position turned out to be seriously exaggerated. I do not entirely blame the defendants for this. It may well be that they did not sufficiently appreciate the need for precision in the framing of their witness statements. But whatever the reason, the fact remains that the defendants' oral evidence, coupled with such documentary evidence as they were able to produce relating to their financial affairs (I referred earlier to the fact that documents were disclosed on a piecemeal basis during the course of the trial), not only failed to approach the degree of particularity reflected in their witness statements, but actually demonstrated that statements of fact made in the passages quoted above were not true.

85 Thus, Mr Davis expressly accepted in cross-examination that there was no such “domino effect” as is referred to in his witness statement. He also accepted that he was not “dependent on” the royalty income. He frankly admitted that there is not, nor has there ever been, any reason why he cannot earn his living as a musician. It was also clear from his evidence that to the extent that he had not taken other jobs as a musician while the royalties were coming in, that was his choice. He acknowledged that at no stage did he have any savings to speak of, and that his present financial difficulties were due to some bad business decisions on his part. He was unable to point to any particular decision having been taken, or act done, whether by him or on his behalf, as being directly referable to the fact that he was in receipt of royalties calculated on a non-prorated basis. Rather, the true position (as revealed in cross-examination) was that he geared his expenditure to the level of his cash resources from time to time: he was content to enjoy the benefits of the royalty payments as and when they came in, and his outgoings increased accordingly. He was (as I find) fully aware at all material times that royalty income from a particular release tends to reduce over time to nil or a negligible sum. Consequently, he realised that his royalty income from the Live Album would not be maintained at the level of the payments received during the first year or so after its release. On the other hand, that realisation did not lead him to limit his outgoings to any significant extent.

86 So far as Mr Satterfield is concerned, I intend no criticism whatever of him when I describe him as having a somewhat relaxed and philosophical attitude to life in general, and in particular to financial and administrative matters. Like Mr Davis, Mr Satterfield accepted that there is nothing to prevent him continuing to earn his living as a musician, but, as he put it disarmingly in cross-examination, he earns money when he feels like it. He accepted that the assertion in his witness statement that he cannot work because he cannot afford the up-front hotel and travel costs is an overstatement. Further, it was apparent from his evidence, and I find, that such assets as he and his wife acquired post-1990 (including a number of properties in Chicago which his wife purchased with a view to refurbishment and letting) were not acquired in reliance on a future royalty stream but were purchased ad hoc, as and when they considered that they could afford it. At the conclusion of his cross-examination Mr Satterfield described his current financial position as follows (according to my note):

“I have no money left from my earnings. My lifestyle is hard to explain; you would not believe it. When I got the money in I spent it rather than saved it. A lot of the things I spent it on I am involved in now. I spent it for other people. I have done this throughout my career.”

In general, whilst it would plainly not be accurate to describe the defendants as having been careful with their money, I am satisfied that in gauging how much they could spend from time to time they had regard to their current cash resources, the principal source of which (at least in the first two years after the release of the Live Album) was their royalty income.

87 On the basis of the defendants' oral evidence, coupled with such documentary evidence as they were able to produce, I am unable to find that any particular item of expenditure was directly referable to the overpayments of royalties. Their evidence was simply too vague and unspecific to justify such a finding. On the other hand, in the particular circumstances of the instant case the absence of such a finding is not, in my judgment, fatal to the defence of the change of position. Given that the approach of the defendants to their respective financial affairs was, essentially, to gear their outgoings to their income from time to time (usually, it would seem, spending somewhat more than they received), and bearing in mind that the instant case involves not a single overpayment but a series of overpayments at periodic intervals over some six years, it is in my judgment open to the court to find, and I do find, that the overpayments caused a general change of position by the defendants in that they increased their level of outgoing by reference to the sums so paid. In particular, the fact that in the instant case the overpayments took the form of a series of periodical payments over an extended period seems to me to be significant in the context of a defence of change of position, in that it places the defendants in a stronger position to establish a general change of position such as I have described, consequent upon such overpayments.

88 Nor, on the evidence, can the defendants' increased level of expenditure be regarded as consisting exclusively of expenditure which (to use Lord Goff's words) “might in any event have been incurred in the ordinary course of things”. I am satisfied that had the defendants been paid the correct sums by way of royalties their levels of expenditure would have been lower.

89 I accordingly conclude that each of the defendants has changed his position in consequence of the overpayments. The question then arises whether the defendants can rely on their change of position as a defence to the entirety of the claim, or only to some (and if so what) part of it.

90 In my judgment, the defence of change of position which I have found to be established cannot extend to the entirety of the claim, if only because had the correct amount of royalties been paid the defendants' level of outgoings might not have reduced proportionately. The defendants' propensity to overspend their income means that it is impossible to establish an exact correlation between their income and their outgoings.

91 So how far does the defence of change of position extend? I accept Mr Howe's submission that, on the particular facts of the instant case, the court should adopt a broad approach to this question; if only because, for reasons already given, the defendants' evidence as to their financial affairs does not admit of detailed analysis.

92 In all the circumstances as I have found them, I conclude that the defence of change of position extends to one half of the overpayments: in other words, that (subject to the Limitation Issue) the claimant's recovery should be limited to $172,575.61 and £14,685.12. In my judgment that represents, on the evidence, a conservative assessment of extent to which the overpayments led to a change of position on the part of the defendants.

93 It is, however, to be observed that limiting the claim to half the overpayments will almost certainly have no practical effect, since on the evidence it is highly improbable, to put it no higher, that the defendants' future royalty entitlement from sales of the Live Album will amount to anything approaching that sum.

== See also ==
- English unjust enrichment
