= Great Onyx Cave =

Cave in Kentucky, USA

Coordinates: 37°13′7″N 86°4′44″W

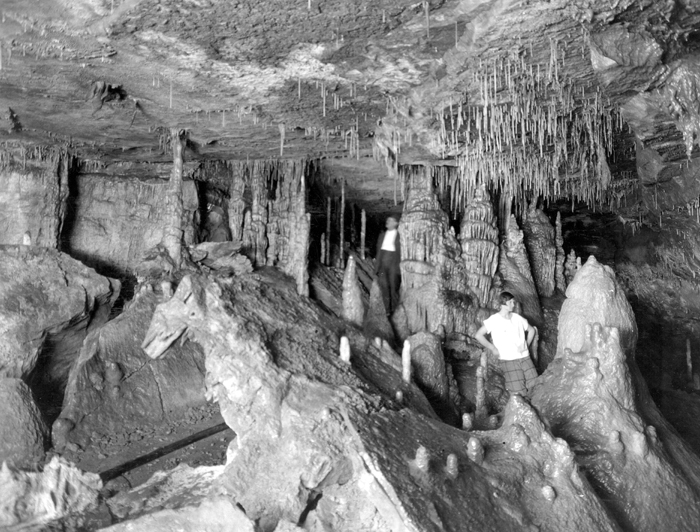
Cave formations near the entrance of Great Onyx Cave in 1925.

Great Onyx Cave is a cave located in Mammoth Cave National Park in Kentucky, United States. The National Park Service offers a commercial tour of the cave.

== Discovery ==
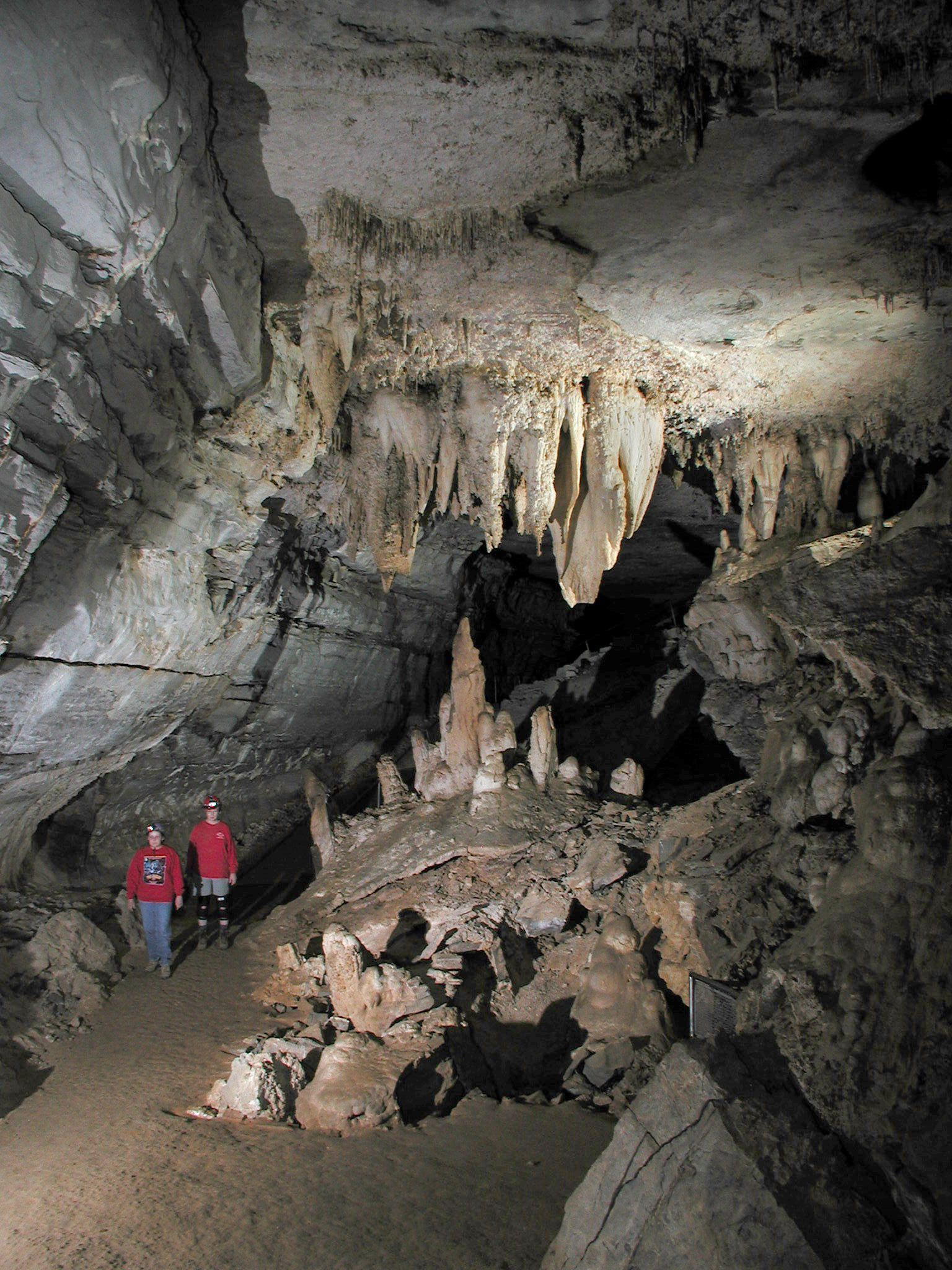
Cave passage in Great Onyx Cave in 2002

Great Onyx Cave was possibly discovered in 1915 by Edmund Turner. According to one story, Turner made a proposition to Flint Ridge landowner L. P. Edwards, knowing through his cave explorations that there was a cave under Edwards' land. Turner asked Edwards if he could have a share in the cave's ownership if he showed Edwards where to dig. Edwards agreed, and the resulting cave was named Great Onyx Cave because of its cave onyx formations. Turner continued to explore the cave while Edwards rushed to commercialize it. Shortly thereafter, when Turner died (probably of pneumonia), Edwards claimed that he discovered the cave.

== History ==
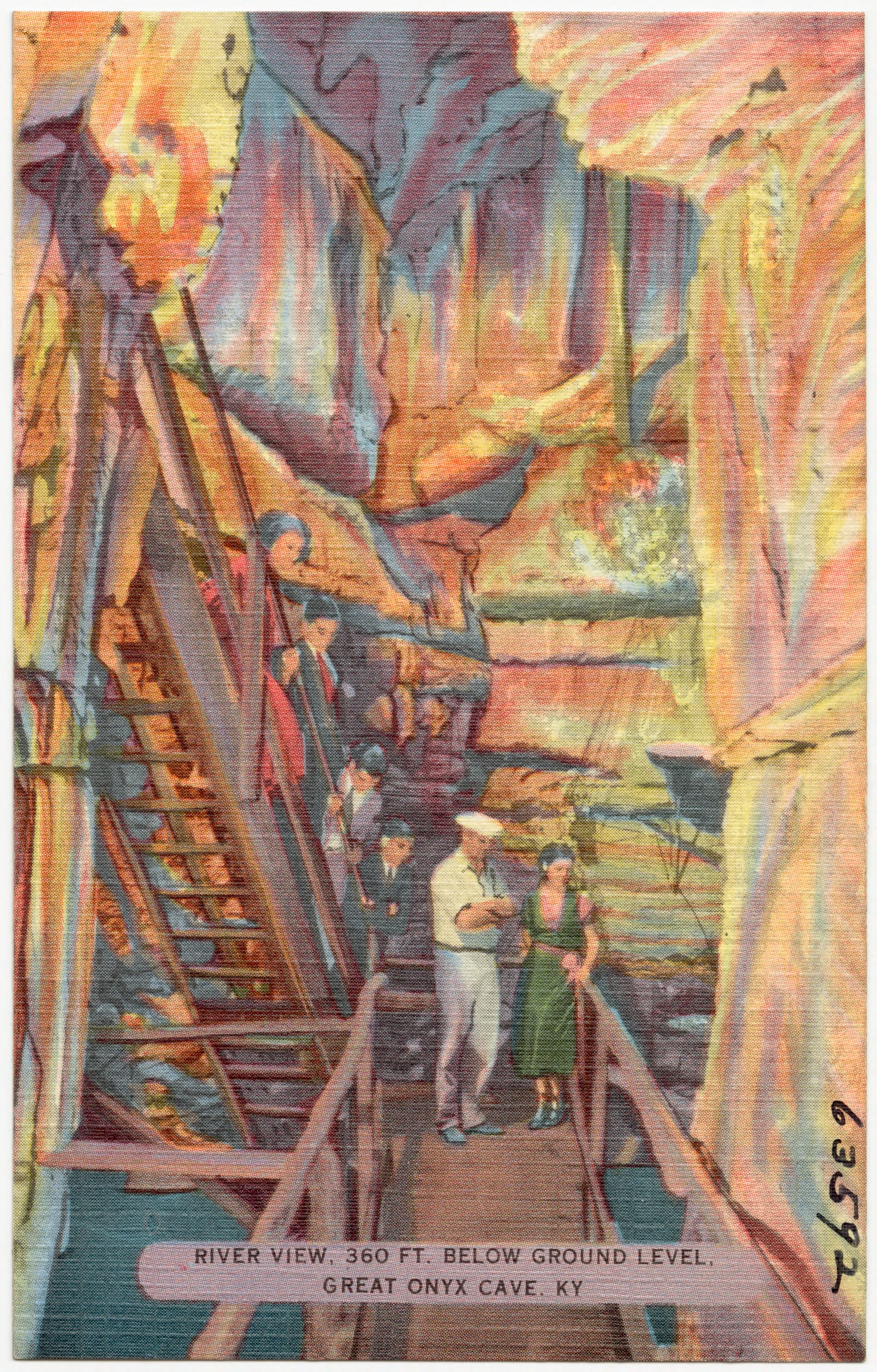
Postcard c.1950

The owners of Great Onyx Cave refused to sell their land when the federal government was purchasing property for Mammoth Cave National Park during the 1930s. When the National Park was established in 1941, Great Onyx Cave remained a privately held "island" within the Park's borders. The cave was finally sold to the National Park Service and became a part of the National Park in January 1961.

== Court case ==
The Great Onyx Case was also the subject of litigation that reached Kentucky's high courts in 1929 (232 Ky. 791, 24 S.W.2d 619). Edwards was successfully sued by a neighboring landowner (Lee) who alleged that the cave ran underneath his property. Invoking the ad coelem et ad inferos principle, the court ordered restitution of all profits derived from running tours on the plaintiff's property. However, the basis of this ruling has been subject to much controversy: invoking the user principle of damages for trespass, the plaintiff ought to have been due only reasonable rental value of the land. It is for this reason that unjust enrichment theorists at Oxford University believe the case to have been one of unjust enrichment, the enrichment of the defendant having been at the expense of the plaintiff's proprietary right, thus severing the link between enrichment and loss and thereby confirming the unjust enrichment analysis of cases such as Trustee of FC Jones and Son v Jones, Foskett v McKeown and the doctrine of equitable tracing.

== Lack of connection ==
Great Onyx Cave is unusual in that it has not yet been connected to nearby Mammoth Cave; it is the only major Flint Ridge cave which has yet to be connected with the Flint Ridge Cave System, despite exploration efforts. In fact, passages in the Flint Ridge Cave System pass beneath surveyed passages in Great Onyx Cave. Rocks and sand were piled against the walls of the cave to make trails when the cave was commercialized, possibly blocking off passages which might connect to Mammoth Cave. Legend has it that this was the revenge of Turner, who was never able to profit from his discovery of Great Onyx Cave, against Edwards.

== See also ==
- List of caves in the United States
