= Rowe v Vale of White Horse DC =

English unjust enrichment law case

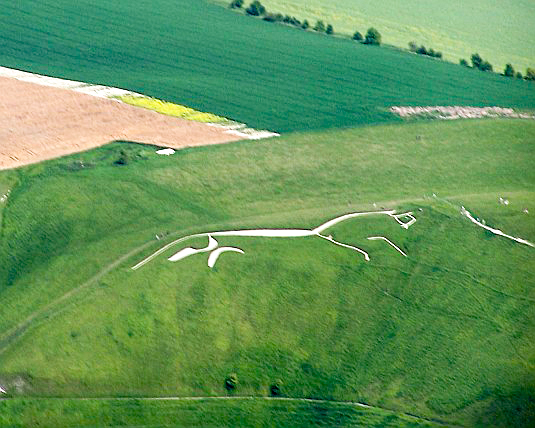
- Court: High Court
- Citations: [2003] EWHC 388 (Admin), [2003] 1 Lloyd’s Rep 418

Keywords
- Enrichment

Rowe v Vale of White Horse DC [2003] EWHC 388 (Admin) is an English unjust enrichment law case, concerning the nature of an enrichment.

== Facts ==
Mr Rowe did not get charged for sewerage from 1982 to 1995 because of administrative error and till 2001 because the Vale of White Horse District Council was unsure whether it had legal power to operate the local sewerage station. In 2001 the District Council found it did have the power, and in March it wrote demanding payment since 1995. Mr Rowe said he had no idea there would be a charge beyond his council and water rates, and applied for judicial review.

== Judgment ==
Lightman J, treating the case as a private law question of whether the Council was entitled to payment, held that there was enrichment through an incontrovertible benefit, but was no right because there was no unjust factor. It was common ground that a benefit was received and there was no defence of change of position. There is enrichment if services are either freely accepted or there is an incontrovertible benefit. Although the Council argued that Mr Rowe freely accepted the services, there was no acquiescence in their supply for a consideration. The council could not suggest an unjust factor, e.g. mistake on the part of the council. He cited G&J para 1-019 to say that if a reasonable person ought to have known that someone would have expected payment, but did not take a reasonable opportunity to reject them, then he will be considered enriched. And normally a ratepayer will think he must pay for services, but this case was different.

12. ... In absence of proof of such acquiescence, the principle of free acceptance cannot be invoked to satisfy the second condition. But it is common ground that the receipt of the services constituted an incontrovertible benefit and that the second condition is to be deemed to be satisfied for this reason.’ 14. ... ‘But the facts of this case are far removed from the ordinary case. Most particularly in the circumstances of this case and by reason of the administrative oversight of the Council over the period 1982 to 1995 and what can only be described as the extraordinary error of judgement by the Council between 1995 and 2001, the Council created and perpetuated the totally reasonable belief on the part of consumers of its services (and most particularly its former tenants) that there was no payment to be paid (beyond what was already paid to the Council and the TWA) in respect of the sewerage services and there arose no occasion for Mr. Rowe to reject the services.

== See also ==
- English unjust enrichment law
