= Anthony Evans (judge) =

British judge (1934–2026)

The Right Honourable Sir Anthony Evans RD

Lord Justice of Appeal
- In office 1992–2000
- Monarch: Elizabeth II

Personal details
- Born: 11 June 1934
- Died: 2 August 2026 (aged 92)
- Occupation: Judge
- Profession: Law

Sir Anthony Howell Meurig Evans, RD, PC (11 June 1934 – 2 August 2026) was a British jurist, judge and barrister, who served as Lord Justice of Appeal from 1992 to 2000.

Evans later held the office of Chief Justice of the Dubai International Financial Centre Court and was the first person to hold that office. He was appointed to the post in April 2005 by Sheikh Maktoum bin Rashid Al Maktoum, who was then ruler of Dubai. Evans previously held high judicial office in the courts of England and Wales, sitting on the Court of Appeal and the Queen's Bench Division of the High Court of Justice, including the Commercial Court (which is part of the Queen's Bench Division).

Evans died on 2 August 2026, aged 92.
