= Exall v Partridge =

English unjust enrichment case

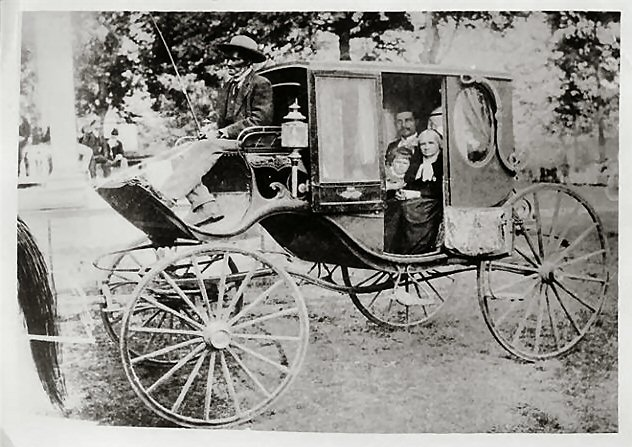
- Court: Court of King's Bench
- Decided: 8 June 1799
- Citation: (1799) 8 TR 308, 101 ER 1405, [1775–1802] All ER Rep 341

Court membership
- Judges sitting: Lord Kenyon CJ, Grose, Lawrence and Le Blanc JJ

Exall v Partridge (1799) 101 ER 1405 is an English unjust enrichment law case, concerning enrichment through discharge of a debt, and the unjust factor of legal compulsion to give another a benefit.

== Facts ==
Exall left his carriage on Partridge's land for repair. Partridge, a coachbuilder, was a co-tenant with the other defendants but the only one in occupation after having been assigned their interests. The rent was not paid and the landlord, Mr Welch seized Exall's carriage as distress, as was lawful. Exall paid the rent to recover the carriage and then sued Partridge and the other defendants to get his money back.

== Judgment ==
The Court of King's Bench held the money could be recovered. Lord Kenyon CJ gave the first speech.

It has been said that where one person is benefited by the payment of money by another, the law raises an assumpsit against the former; but that I deny: if that were so, and I owed a sum of money to a friend, and an enemy chose to pay that debt, the latter might convert himself into my debtor nolens volens... none of those points affect the present question. As the plaintiff put his goods on the premises, knowing the interests of the defendants, and thereby placed himself in a situation where he was liable to pay this money, without the concurrence of two of the defendants, I thought at the trial that it was money paid to the use of [Partridge] only; but on that point I have since doubted; and I rather think that the opinion I gave at the trial was not well founded.

Grose J concurred.

The question is, whether the payment made by the plaintiff, under these circumstance, were such a one from which the law will imply a promise by the three defendants to repay? I think it was... The plaintiff could not have relieved himself from the distress without paying the rent: it was not therefore a voluntary, but a compulsory payment. Under these circumstances, the law implies a promise by the three defendants to repay the plaintiff; and, on this short ground, I am of the opinion that the action may be maintained.

Lawrence J concurred. So did Le Blanc J.

by compulsion of law he was obliged to pay that debt; and therefore, I think he has his remedy against the three persons who by law were bound to pay, and who did not pay this money.

== See also ==
- English unjust enrichment law
