= Woolwich Building Society v IRC =

Woolwich Equitable Building Society v Inland Revenue Commissioners
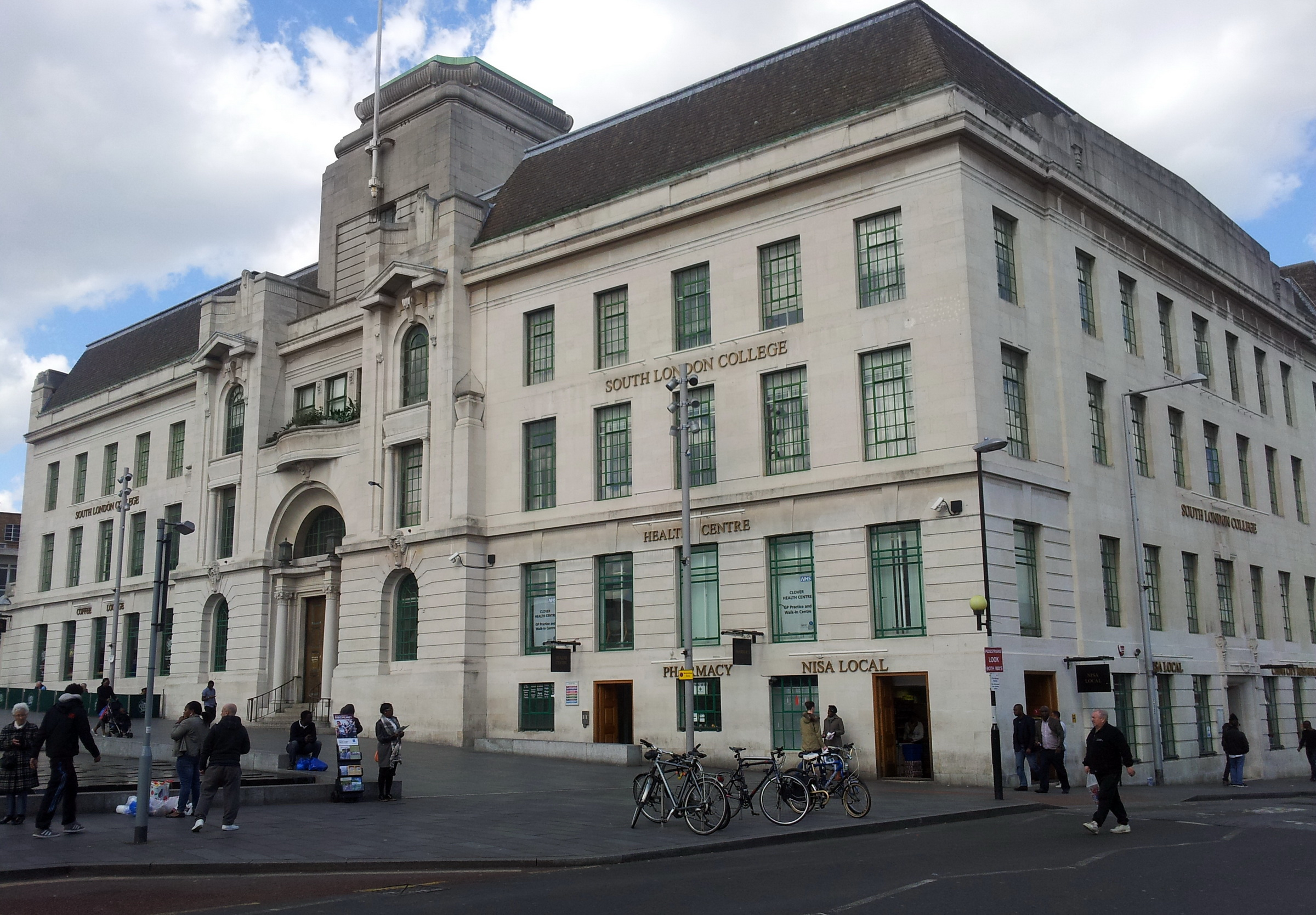
- Woolwich's headquarters at the time of the dispute.
- Court: House of Lords
- Decided: 20 July 1992
- Citations: [1993] AC 70 [1992] 3 WLR 366

Court membership
- Judges sitting: Lord Goff; Lord Browne-Wilkinson; Lord Slynn; Lord Keith of Kinkel; Lord Jauncey

Keywords
- restitution; interest; ultra vires

Woolwich Equitable Building Society v Inland Revenue Commissioners [1993] AC 70 is an English unjust enrichment law case, concerning to what extent enrichment of the defendant must be at the expense of the claimant.

The case related to tax demands that were later held in judicial review proceedings to be ultra vires, and therefore void. The Inland Revenue repaid the tax, but disputed their liability to pay interest on the money during the time which they had held it.

== Facts ==
The Woolwich Building Society was charged £57 million in tax that it objected to as being assessed under a tax law which it alleged was ultra vires. It paid the sums on a "without prejudice" basis, and then sought judicial review with a view to reclaiming the tax. The House of Lords agreed with Woolwich. The revenue repaid the tax, but refused to pay any interest, which was agreed to be in the amount of £6.73 million. Under section 35A of the Supreme Court Act 1981 interest would only be given at the court’s discretion if an entitlement to restitution of the principal could be made out. So because there was a dispute of the interest, the question was whether Woolwich was entitled as of right to restitution of the principal. The problem was a claim based on mistake could not succeed, because Woolwich argued it was ultra vires from the start. It was not duress, because the only threat by the Revenue would be to sue for non payment, and threatening to sue is legitimate pressure. Nor was it duress colore officii because the Revenue was not impliedly threatening to withhold performance of a duty owed to Woolwich.

== Judgment ==
Lord Goff, Browne-Wilkinson and Slynn said that a demand for payment by a public authority ultra vires was a good ground for restitution itself, in essence a public law ground for restitution based on a constitutional principle of no taxation without Parliament. The Bill of Rights article 4 says there should be no taxation without legislation.

Lord Slynn said the mistake of law bar was ‘open to review by your Lordships’ House’.

Lord Keith dissented.

Lord Jauncey also dissented.

== See also ==
- English unjust enrichment law
