= Trustee of FC Jones & Son v Jones =

English legal case

Trustee of FC Jones and Son (a firm) v Jones
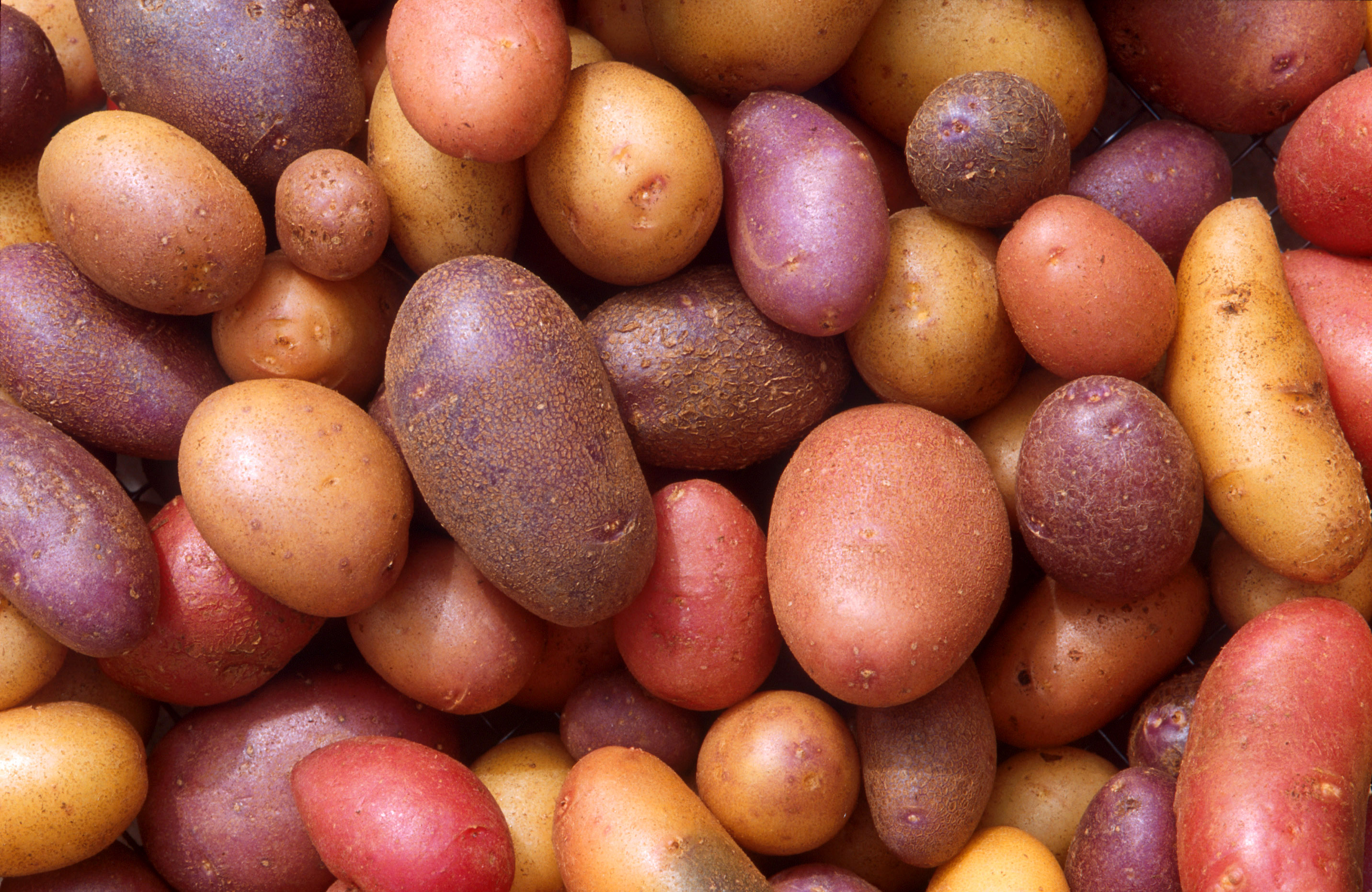
- Court: Court of Appeal
- Full case name: Trustee of FC Jones and Son (a firm) v Ann Jones (a married woman)
- Decided: 25 April 1996
- Citation: [1996] EWCA Civ 1324, [1997] Ch 159

Court membership
- Judges sitting: Nourse LJ; Beldam LJ; Millett LJ

Case opinions
- Millett LJ

Keywords
- Expense of the claimant

Trustee of FC Jones and Son (a firm) v Jones [1996] EWCA Civ 1324 is an English unjust enrichment law case, concerning to what extent enrichment of the defendant must be at the expense of the claimant.

== Facts ==
Mr Jones transferred £11,700 in cheques from his potato growing firm’s bank account to Mrs Jones. The firm became insolvent, which vested the account retrospectively into the trustee in bankruptcy. Mrs Jones bought potato futures, and earned £50,760. This was put into an account with Raphael & Sons plc. The official receiver claimed that under the Bankruptcy Act 1914 sections 37 and 38, the money belonged to it. Mrs Jones claimed it was hers, but the sum was paid into court.

== Judgment ==
Millett LJ held the trustee in bankruptcy could recover everything. From the date of the act of bankruptcy, all money in the bankrupts’ joint accounts belonged to the trustee in bankruptcy. Mr Jones had no title to the money paid out, and could therefore not pass title to Mrs Jones. Equity had no role. The deposit of the trustee’s money under the contract’s terms with the commodity broker belonged to the trustee.

Significantly in Jones it was indicated that a fiduciary relationship was no longer an exclusive precondition for the use of equitable tracing, the fiduciary character of the defendant's receipt was expressly negatived.

== See also ==
- English unjust enrichment law
- Tracing in English law
