= Lord Napier and Ettrick v Hunter =

1993 English House of Lords legal case

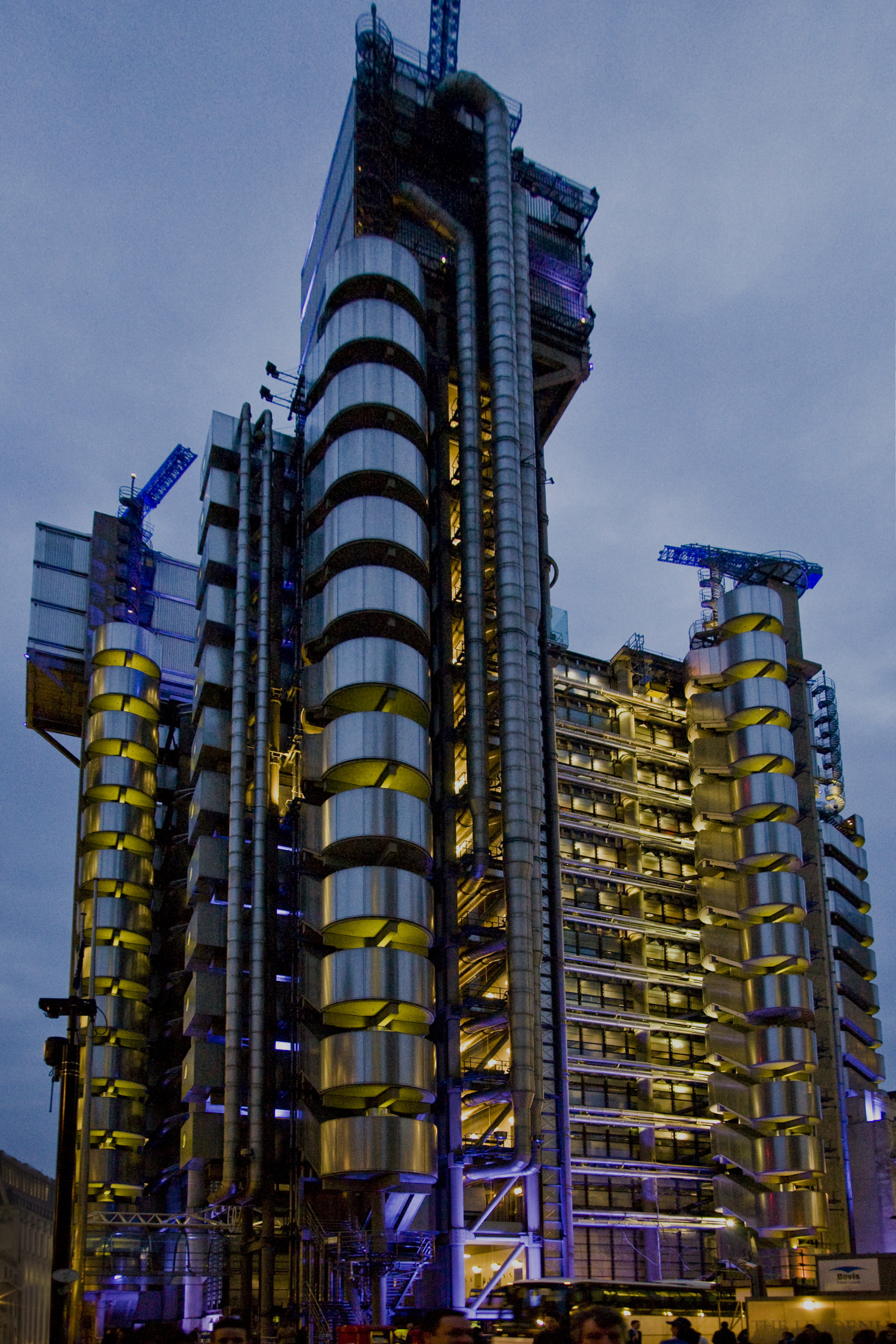
- Lloyd's of London
- Court: House of Lords
- Full case name: (1) Lord Napier and Another v Hunter and Others (2) Lord Napier and Ettrick v R.F. Kershaw Ltd and Others
- Decided: 10 December 1992
- Citations: [1993] AC 713 [1993] 2 WLR 42 [1993] 1 Lloyds Rep 197 [1993] 1 All ER 385

Case history
- Appealed from: [1993] 1 Lloyd's Rep 10

Court membership
- Judges sitting: Lord Templeman; Lord Goff of Chieveley; Lord Jauncey of Tullichettle; Lord Browne-Wilkinson; Lord Slynn of Hadley

Case opinions
- Lord Templeman; Lord Goff of Chieveley; Lord Jauncey of Tullichettle; Lord Browne-Wilkinson

Keywords
- insurance; subrogation; equitable lien

Lord Napier and Ettrick v Hunter [1993] AC 713 was a judicial decision of House of Lords relating to the right of subrogation (and in particular, the quantification of that right) where an insurer pays with respect to an insured risk and the assured later recovers damages from a third party with respect to that same loss. The case also determined that the right of subrogation is fortified by an equitable lien over the proceeds of the claim against the third party.

Despite being recorded as the representative name for the syndicate in the litigation, Lord Napier was not actually insured by the stop loss insurers, and so was not affected by the judgment.

== Facts ==
The appellants were a syndicate of names at Lloyds, (referred to in the judgment as "the names") and had agreed to underwrite certain insurance policies relating to asbestos claims in 1992. A number of very substantial claims were made under those policies which cost the names a great deal of money. Their losses were exacerbated because of a lack of reinsurance cover for those risks. In earlier proceedings the names had brought a claim against the syndicate manager (Outhwaite) alleging negligence in this regard. Outhwaite paid £116 million to settle those claims.

The names had also had "stop loss" insurance of their own with the respondents, the stop loss insurers. The respondents had paid out under the stop loss policies. The stop loss insurers now claimed to be subrogated to the settlement money paid by Outhwaite. It was not disputed that the stop loss insurers had a right of subrogation, but the dispute related to the amount to which they were subrogated.

In the lead judgment Lord Templeman used a hypothetical set of figures. He assumed in each case that each of the names had suffered a net underwriting loss for the year of £160,000. He also assumed that they had stop loss insurance for a total of £100,000 subject to an excess of £25,000 (so the name would have to pay out £25,000 of their own money before the stop loss insurance kicked in). So the first £25,000 was met by the name. The "next" £100,000 was met by the stop loss insurers. And the "last" £35,000 was met by the name again (as the insurance cover was exhausted). Lord Templeman also assumed that the hypothetical amount which each name recovered from Outhwaite was £130,000. So the question was: how much of that £130,000 would the stop loss insurers be subrogated to?

== Judgments ==
=== First instance ===
At first instance Saville J had held (using Lord Templeman's hypothetical figures) because each name had suffered a personal loss of £60,000 then they could retain that amount of their share of the settlement payment, and the balance (£70,000) would be paid over to the stop loss insurers by way of subrogation. However, as Lord Templeman pointed out, the difficulty with that is that it ignored the fact that the name agreed to bear the first excess layer of £25,000, and so were effectively co-insurers for the loss to that extent.

That appeal was reversed in part by the Court of Appeal, and from there the parties appealed and cross-appealed to the House of Lords.

=== House of Lords ===
Lord Templeman gave the lead judgment.

==== Quantum ====
He held that the "first" £25,000 should be ignored as the names had contractually agreed to bear that loss. He thought the best way to analyse the loss was to imagine three different policies of insurance covering the total amount of the loss: the first for up to £25,000; the second for anything above £25,000 up to £125,000; and third for anything above £125,000 up to £160,000. Analysed that way the money received from Outhwaite would be applied to the third pool first (so the names got the first £35,000 of the settlement amount), and then applied to the second pool (so the stop loss insurers received the next £95,000, which exhausted the amounts received from Outhwaite). He distinguished the case which Saville J had relied upon: Castellain v Preston (1883) 11 QBD 380.

==== Equitable lien ====
Much more of his judgment was dedicated to the issue of whether an equitable lien arose. There was considerable concern about whether the stop loss insurers could recover if the court did not impose an equitable lien. Many of the names resided abroad, and it was expected that many of them might be declared bankrupt because of their inability to meet their primary obligations. After carefully reviewing a number of cases where equity intervened, either to hold that the assured held the sums as trustee, or to grant injunctions to restrain any misapplication of the proceeds, he summarised:

In order to protect the rights of the insurer under the doctrine of subrogation equity considers that the damages payable by the wrongdoer to the insured person are subject to an equitable lien or charge in favour of the insurer.

Lord Templeman expressly declined to state whether an equitable lien would also extend to a cause of action itself (as opposed to the proceeds of such a claim).

Lord Goff gave the first concurring judgment. He noted that the law of subrogation had actually developed separately across different branches of law rather than cohesively. He noted that the cases were "spadmodic but consistent" in holding that equity would protect the insurer's claim. He felt the most important case on this was White v Dobinson (1844) 14 Sim 273; 116 LTOS 233. Lord Goff respectfully doubted the expression of opinion made by Diplock J in Yorkshire Insurance Co Ltd v Nisbett Shipping Co Ltd [1962] 2 QB 330 at 339 and repeated as Lord Diplock in Hobbs v Marlowe [1978] AC 16 at 30 to the effect that subrogation was a common law right based upon implied terms which was only supported by equity.

Lord Browne-Wilkinson gave a short supporting judgments, largely focussed upon whether the right of subrogation was legal or equitable, expressing the firm view that it was equitable.

Lord Jauncey gave a short concurring judgment, and Lord Slynn merely expressed agreement.

== Commentary ==
Lord Napier v Hunter has generally been accepted without criticism, and is now treated as one of the leading authorities in relation to the English law of unjust enrichment, and in particular with respect to proprietary remedies in relation thereto. However, the editors of Goff & Jones comment: "There are good reasons for thinking that the House of Lords went too far in Napier when it gave the Stop Loss insurers a proprietary claim. It is a difficult question when the law should give a proprietary remedy to a claimant who makes out a claim in unjust enrichment, but the law does not often give such a remedy to a claimant who has paid money under a contract which gives him no security interest although he was free to bargain for such an interest."

The case has been cited and applied in a number of subsequent judgments, including subsequently by the House of Lords and Supreme Court:

- Caledonian North Sea Ltd v London Bridge Engineering Ltd [2002] UKHL 4, relating to the Piper Alpha disaster
- Zurich Insurance Plc UK Branch v International Energy Group Ltd [2015] UKSC 33
- Bailey v Angove’s Pty Ltd [2016] UKSC 47
