= Holiday v Sigil =

English trusts case law

- Court: Court of Chancery
- Citation: (1826) 2 C&P 176

Keywords
- Receipt, ignorance

Holiday v Sigil (1826) 2 C&P 176 is a case at common law concerning the recovery of a banknote.

== Facts ==
The defendant had a £500 note that had been dropped by the plaintiff. The plaintiff brought an action for money had and received. The trial was by jury.

== Judgment ==
Abbott CJ gave the following directions to the jury.

The question to be considered is, whether you are satisfied that the plaintiff lost this note, and that the defendant found it; for if you are, the plaintiff is entitled to your verdict. I should observe, that it is scarcely possible for a plaintiff, when his property is stolen, or accidentally lost, to prove the loss by direct evidence; and, therefore, that must in almost all cases be made out by circumstances.

The jury found for the plaintiff, and damages of £500 were awarded.

== See also ==
- English trusts law
