= Clarke v Dickson =

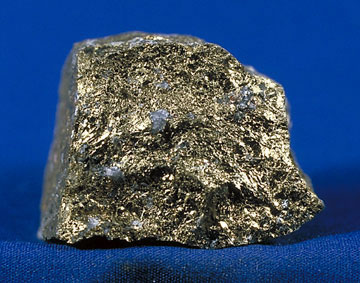
- Citation: (1858) EB & E 148

Keywords
- Misrepresentation, rescission, counter restitution

Clarke v Dickson (1858) EB & E 148 is an English contract law case concerning misrepresentation. It stands as an example of the restrictive approach common law courts took to rescission for misrepresentation before the leading case of Erlanger v New Sombrero Phosphate Co held only substantial counter restitution was needed.

== Facts ==
Mr Clarke said he was induced by the three defendants’ statements to take shares in The Welsh Potosi Lead and Copper Mining Company, formed for working on a mine on the cost-book principle. Dividends were declared in 1854-6. Then Mr Clarke accepted fresh allotments in lieu of dividends. In 1857 the company's performance was poor and it was liquidated under the Winding-up Act 1855. Then Mr Clarke discovered that the representations about its cost-book practices were false and fraudulent. He sued to recover deposits for the shares.

== Judgment ==
Crompton J held that the contract could not be rescinded, since the shares were now worthless. He said where someone wants to exercise the voidable option,

...he must be in such a situation as to be able to put the parties into their original state before the contract... But then what did he buy? Shares in a partnership with others. He cannot return those; he has become bound to those others... Take the case I put in argument, of a butcher buying live cattle, killing them, and even selling the meat to his customers. If the rule of law were as the plaintiff contends, that butcher might, upon discovering a fraud on the part of the grazier who sold him the cattle, rescind the contract and get back the whole price: but how could that be consistent with justice?

Erle J and Lord Campbell CJ concurred.

== See also ==
- English contract law
- Misrepresentation in English law
- UK company law
