= Peter Birks =

British legal academic

Peter Brian Herrenden Birks QC FBA (3 October 1941 – 6 July 2004) was the Regius Professor of Civil Law at the University of Oxford from 1989 until his death. He also became a Fellow of the British Academy in 1989, and an honorary Queen's counsel in 1995. He was a Fellow of All Souls College, Oxford. He is widely credited as having sparked academic enthusiasm for the English law of Restitution, and is often considered to have been one of the greatest English legal scholars of the 20th century.

In his obituary, he was described as "a key figure in the extraordinary development of the law of restitution in the last 45 years".

== Career ==
Birks was educated at Chislehurst and Sidcup Grammar School, went up to Trinity College, Oxford and subsequently obtained a master of laws from the Faculty of Laws at University College London.

Birks was also the first general editor of English Private Law, a book which sought to summarise and rationalise the entire scope of English private law, in accordance with Birks' own passionate belief for order and characterisation within a discipline (law) which he regarded as too eclectic and inconsistent. He also wrote An Introduction to the Law of Restitution and Unjust Enrichment, and wrote some 142 contributions to legal reviews.

In Woolwich Building Society v Inland Revenue Commissioners the House of Lords substantially adopted the reasoning set out in an academic essay by Birks, described in the judgment of Lord Goff as "powerful".

Birks was elected a foreign member of the Royal Netherlands Academy of Arts and Sciences in 2001.

== Biography ==
Peter Birks arrived at his Kent grammar school (Chislehurst and Sidcup) in 1957 after a year at Repton and after spending his childhood in India.

His daughter is the model Laura Bailey.

Birks died of cancer, aged 62, on 6 July 2004.

== Bibliography ==
Books

- An Introduction to the Law of Restitution (Oxford University Press, 1988)
- Unjust Enrichment (Clarendon, 2004)
- English Private Law (OUP, 2000)
- Restitution: The future (Federation Press, 1992)

Articles

- 'Before We Begin: Five Keys to Land Law', in S Bright & J Dewar, Land Law: Themes and Perspectives (OUP 1998) 457-86
- 'Compulsory Subjects: Will the Seven Foundations ever Crumble?' [1995] 1 Web JCLI
- 'The Implied Contract Theory of Quasi-Contract: Civilian Opinion Current in the Century before Blackstone' (1986) 6(1) OJLS 46–85
