= Gareth Jones (legal scholar) =

Welsh academic

Gareth Hywel Jones, QC, FBA (10 November 1930 – 2 April 2016) was a Welsh academic and longtime fellow of Trinity College, Cambridge, and Professor of Law at the University of Cambridge.

== Biography ==
Jones was born in 1930 in Tylorstown, in the Rhondda. He was educated at the Rhondda County School for Boys, University College London, St Catharine's College, Cambridge and Harvard College. He became a teaching fellow of Trinity College, Cambridge in 1961, becoming Senior Tutor in 1972, and was appointed Downing Professor of the Laws of England in 1974. Jones was Vice-Master of Trinity from 1986 to 1992, and from 1996 to 1999. He was a fellow of the British Academy. He became a foreign member of the Royal Netherlands Academy of Arts and Sciences in 1991.

Jones was the co-author of Goff & Jones, The Law of Restitution and, with Robert Goff, the acknowledged father of English restitution law.

== Publications ==
- Goff & Jones, The Law of Restitution, Author Professor Gareth Jones (7th Ed, Sweet & Maxwell, 2009)
