= Goff & Jones =

English law textbook on restitution and unjust enrichment

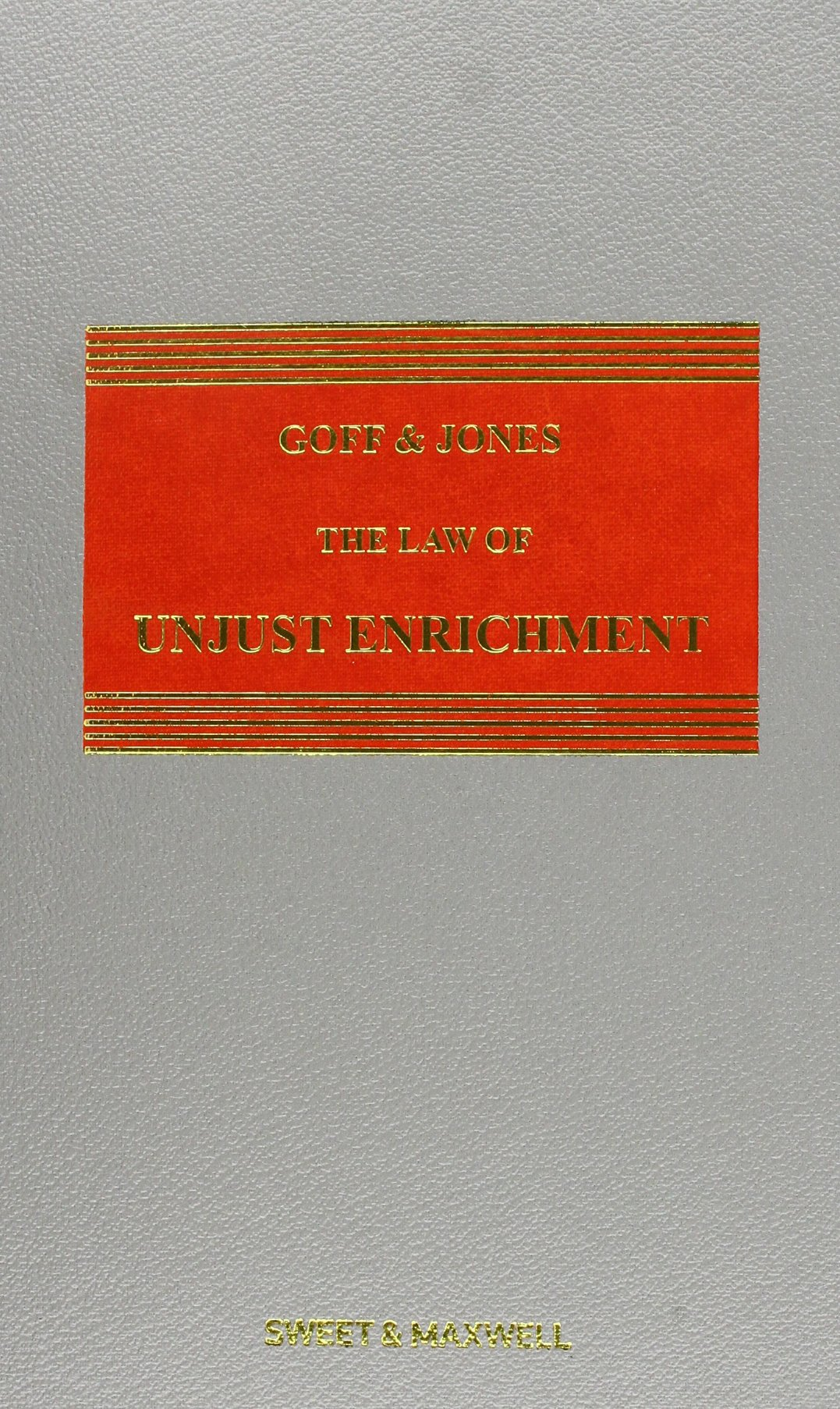
Goff & Jones in its ninth edition

Goff and Jones on the Law of Unjust Enrichment (formerly Goff and Jones on the Law of Restitution, usually simply abbreviated to Goff & Jones) is the leading authoritative English law textbook on restitution and unjust enrichment. First written by Robert Goff and Gareth Jones, it is presently in its tenth edition. It is published by Sweet & Maxwell and forms part of the Common Law Library.

As a textbook it is somewhat remarkable in that although the first edition was published in 1966, it was not until 1991 (25 years later) that the House of Lords formally recognised unjust enrichment as a separate branch of jurisprudence. It is notable that a number of the key decisions in the field have been handed down by Lord Goff, and often reflect the analysis which has previously expressed academically in Goff & Jones. For example, Goff's judgment in Barclays Bank Ltd v W J Simms, Son and Cooke (Southern) Ltd [1980] 1 QB 677 was described as "the Donoghue v Stevenson of restitution for mistake", but largely reflected the same rationalisation of the law in this area which he had supported in Goff & Jones.

It has been said "[i]t is no exaggeration to say that the law of unjust enrichment would not exist, certainly not as we know it, if it was not for Goff & Jones." Lord Rodger said that "Goff and Jones are the Romulus and Remus of the English Law of Restitution ... Out of a few weak and scattered settlements they founded a powerful city whose hegemony now extends far and wide."

== Background ==
In 1952, Goff was appointed to a Common University Fund lectureship in law, to take effect in 1953. In this capacity, he was required to give a series of lectures on any area of interest to him. When exploring texts for inspiration, he chanced upon "quasi-contracts", a concept traceable to Roman law, but which was at that point unrecognised in English law. Together with Ronnie Maudsley, then the law Tutor at Brasenose College, Oxford, he set up a series of seminars in Restitution, also described as "Unjustifiable Enrichment" and "Quasi Contract". On the basis of these lectures, Goff began work on the book that would later become Goff and Jones on the Law of Restitution (today published as Goff and Jones on the Law of Unjust Enrichment). In 1959, as a junior barrister with a growing practice, Goff realised that if his book was to be completed, he would need a collaborator. A. W. B. Simpson introduced him to Gareth Jones (then fellow at Trinity College, Cambridge, and later Downing Professor of the Laws of England), with whom he would eventually publish the book. Goff would later describe Jones as "the ideal co-author" and "beyond doubt, one of the finest teachers in the common law world".

The book publication took much longer than either Goff or Jones anticipated. The manuscript was submitted in late 1964. The page proofs, which arrived in 1965, had so many mistakes and required so many alterations that the publishers, Sweet & Maxwell, made the authors pay for a second set of proofs. As a result, Goff and Jones made practically no money from the first edition of the book, and Goff complained that Sweet & Maxwell "appeared to understand nothing about writing pioneering books". The book was finally published in 1966.

Upon its release, the book was quickly recognised as a significant work, and was largely favourably reviewed. Lord Denning reflected positively on it, calling it "a creative work" and comparing it to Sir Frederick Pollock's treatise on torts and the seminal textbook Anson's Law of Contract. Edmund Davies, then a judge of the High Court of Justice, described it as "admirable". The book's propositions, however, caused some confusion in academic circles. Not knowing where it fitted, a university library classified it as Criminal Law, and a library of one of the Inns of Court refused to take the book in at all. The book's propositions were also not unanimously welcomed. For example, they were resisted by Lord Diplock, who as late as in 1977 continued to declare judicially that "there is no general doctrine of unjust enrichment recognised in English law".

== Editions ==
Year	Edition	General editors
1966	First	Robert Goff and Gareth Jones
1978	Second	Sir Robert Goff and Gareth Jones
1986	Third	Lord Goff and Gareth Jones
1993	Fourth	Gareth Jones
1998	Fifth	Gareth Jones
2002	Sixth	Gareth Jones
2007	Seventh	Gareth Jones
2011	Eighth	Charles Mitchell, Paul Mitchell and Stephen Watterson
2016	Ninth	Charles Mitchell, Paul Mitchell and Stephen Watterson
2022	Tenth	Charles Mitchell, Paul Mitchell and Stephen Watterson

== Citations ==
Although Lord Goff rarely referred to his own text in judicial decisions, other judges have frequently done so, including the Supreme Court.
