= Attribution of liability to United Kingdom companies =

Attribution of liability to United Kingdom companies involves the rules of contract, agency, capacity, tort and crime as they relate to UK company law. They establish under what circumstances a company may be sued for the actions of its directors, employees and other agents.

== Principles of attribution ==
While a limited company is deemed to be a legal person separate from its shareholders and employees, as a matter of fact a company can only act through its employees, from the board of directors down. So there must be rules to attribute rights and duties to a company from its actors. This usually matters because an aggrieved third party will want to sue whoever has money to pay for breach of an obligation, and companies rather than their employees often have more money.

== Ultra vires and its abolition ==
Up until reforms in 2006 this area used to be complicated significantly by the requirement on companies to specify an objects clause for their business, for instance "to make and sell, or lend on hire, railway-carriages". If companies acted outside their objects, for instance by giving a loan to build railways in Belgium, any such contracts were said to be ultra vires and consequently void. This is what happened in the early case of Ashbury Railway Carriage and Iron Co Ltd v Riche. The policy was thought to protect shareholders and creditors, whose investments or credit would not be used for an unanticipated purpose. However, it soon became clear that the ultra vires rule restricted the flexibility of businesses to expand to meet market opportunities. Void contracts might unexpectedly and arbitrarily hinder business. So companies began to draft ever longer objects clauses, often adding an extra provision stating all objects must be construed as fully separate, or the company's objects include anything directors feel is reasonably incidental to the business. Now the 2006 Act states that companies are deemed to have unlimited objects, unless they opt for restrictions. The 2006 reforms have also clarified the legal position that if a company does have limited objects, an ultra vires act will cause the directors to have breached a duty to follow the constitution under section 171. So a shareholder who disagreed with an action outside the company's objects must sue directors for any loss. Contracts remain valid and third parties will be unaffected by this alone.

== Legal fields ==
=== Contracts and agency law ===
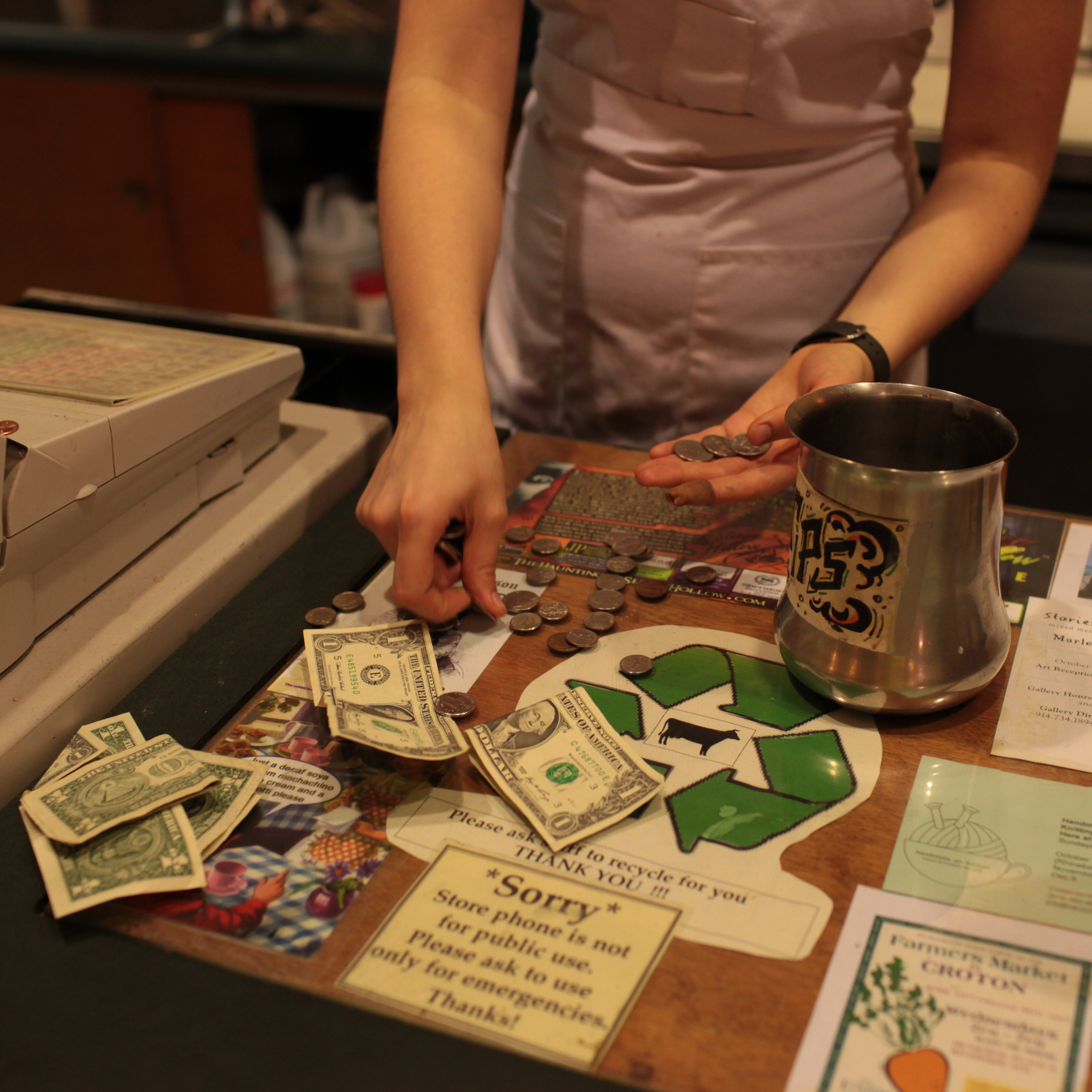
The actions of all employees, in the course of employment become those of the company, when it goes right or wrong.

Contracts between companies and third parties, however, may turn out to be unenforceable on ordinary principals of agency law if the director or employee obviously exceeded their authority. As a general rule, third parties need not be concerned with constitutional details conferring power among directors or employees, which may only be found by searching the register at Companies House. In general, if a third party acts in good faith, then any contract, even one going beyond the constitutional authority of the director or employee with whom they strike a deal, is valid. However, if it would appear to a reasonable person that a company employee would not have the authority to enter an agreement, then the contract is voidable at the company's instance so long as there is no equitable bar to rescission. The third party would have a claim against the (probably less solvent) employee instead. First, an agent may have express actual authority, in which case there is no problem. Her actions will be attributed to the company. Second, an agent may have implied actual authority (also sometimes called "usual" authority), which falls within the usual scope of the employee's office. Third, an agent may have "apparent authority" (also called "ostensible" authority) as it would appear to a reasonable person, creating an estoppel. If the actions of a company employee have authority deriving from a company constitution in none of these ways, a third party will only have recourse for breach of an obligation (a warrant of authority) against the individual agent, and not to the company as the principal. The Companies Act 2006 section 40 makes clear that directors are always deemed to be free of limitations on their authority under the constitution, unless a third party acting in callous bad faith takes advantage of a company whose director acts outside the scope of authority. For employees down the chain of delegation, it becomes less and less likely that a reasonable contracting party would think big transactions will have had authority. For instance, it would be unlikely that a bank cashier would have the authority to sell the bank's Canary Wharf skyscraper.

=== Torts ===
Problems arise where serious torts, and particularly fatal injuries occur as a result of actions by company employees. All torts committed by employees in the course of employment will attribute liability to their company even if acting wholly outside authority, so long as there is some temporal and close connection to work. It is also clear that acts by directors become acts of the company, as they are "the very ego and centre of the personality of the corporation". But despite strict liability in tort, civil remedies are in some instances insufficient to provide a deterrent to a company pursuing business practices that could seriously injure the life, health and environment of other people. Even with additional regulation by government bodies, such as the Health and Safety Executive or the Environment Agency, companies may still have a collective incentive to ignore the rules in the knowledge that the costs and likelihood of enforcement is weaker than potential profits.

=== Crime ===
Criminal sanctions remain problematic, for instance if a company director had no intention to harm anyone, no mens rea, and managers in the corporate hierarchy had systems to prevent employees committing offences, as in Tesco Supermarkets v Nattrass (1972). One step toward reform is found in the Corporate Manslaughter and Corporate Homicide Act 2007. This creates a criminal offence for manslaughter, meaning a penal fine of up to 10 per cent of turnover against companies whose managers conduct business in a grossly negligent fashion, resulting in deaths. Without lifting the veil there remains, however, no personal liability for directors or employees acting in the course of employment, for corporate manslaughter or otherwise. The quality of a company's accountability to a broader public and the conscientiousness of its behaviour must rely also, in great measure, on its governance.

== See also ==
- UK company law
- UK insolvency law
