= Hazell v Hammersmith and Fulham LBC =

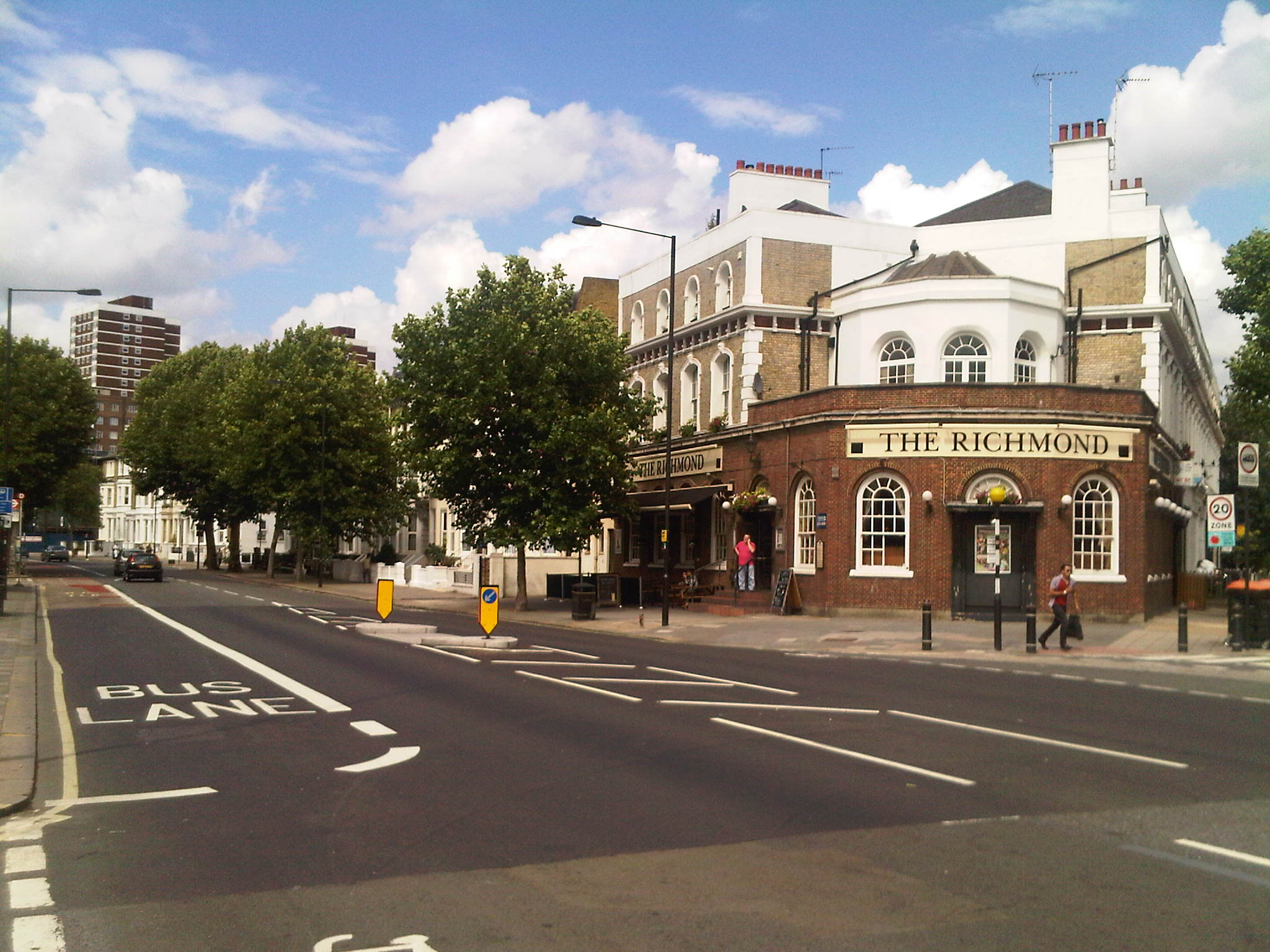
- Court: House of Lords
- Full case name: Hazell and Others v Hammersmith and Fulham LBC
- Decided: 24 January 1991
- Citations: [1992] 2 AC 1 [1991] 2 WLR 372 [1991] 1 All ER 545
- Transcript: judgment

Case history
- Prior action: [1990] 2 QB 697

Court membership
- Judges sitting: Lord Keith of Kinkel; Lord Brandon of Oakbrook; Lord Templeman; Lord Griffiths; Lord Ackner

Case opinions
- Lord Templeman

Keywords
- Resulting trusts, local authority, interest rate swaps

Hazell v Hammersmith and Fulham LBC [1992] 2 AC 1 is an English administrative law case, which declared that local authorities had no power to engage in interest rate swap agreements because they were beyond the council's borrowing powers, and that all the contracts were void. Their actions were held to contravene the Local Government Act 1972.

Prior to the judgment, a large number of local authorities had entered into such swap transactions. Accordingly, the decision of the House of Lords declaring such practices to be unlawful set off a torrent of collateral litigation unwinding such swaps. Although this clearly caused difficulties for the banks and local authorities engaged in such swap transactions, it has been noted that the "swap litigation" was instrumental in developing the modern law of restitution under English law.

== Facts ==
Up until the early 1990s, a number of local authorities had been engaged in interest rate swap transactions as part of managing their debt portfolios. Under the Local Government Act 1972, the local authorities had power to borrow in order to amortise their costs of capital projects over a longer period of time. In connection with that borrowing, certain local authorities sought to enter into swap transactions to hedge their exposure to fluctuations in interest rates. There were some doubts as to the ability of local authorities to enter into such transactions, but the local authorities sought the opinion of Anthony Scrivener QC, a leading commercial silk, who had advised that if a "rate swap is undertaken as part of the proper management of the council's fund then ... the swap will be intra vires" [i.e. within the powers of the council].

Whilst most local authorities engaged in swap transactions on a prudent scale to manage their debt portfolios, the position of Hammersmith and Fulham LBC was different. Writing about the swaps litigation, Professor Ewan McKendrick described it thus:

Hammersmith's participation in the swaps market was on a massive scale which was in no way representative of the activities of the other local authorities in the swaps market. Those local authorities which had entered into the swaps market in a more responsible manner, with a view to the more effective management of their debt portfolio, were not represented in the proceedings and so their voice was never heard. The excessive nature of Hammersmith's involvement in the swaps market may have coloured the perception of the courts ...

In his 2008 book, Follow The Money, Duncan Campbell Smith paints a dramatic picture of the moments before the litigation commenced, with the slowly dawning realisation developing amongst the principals that somehow a very left-wing London borough council has managed to accumulate an extraordinarily large swaps exposure to the various banks simply to be able to collect and spend the premiums for entering into the trades. He describes a call from Howard Davies at the Audit Commission to Goldman Sachs:

Davies duly returned the call. The banker happily explained again the reason for it. She was an American, newly arrived in the London office. She worked on the swaps desk at Goldman and had been familiarizing herself with the book of the bank's existing positions. She’d been intrigued, she said, 'by this guy Hammersmith'. Finding him (she persisted with the joke) on the other side of several Goldman contracts, and not knowing the name, she had made some inquiries. 'And I find this guy's real big in the market. In fact, he’s on the other side of everything. He's in for billions and all on the same side of the market! Anyway, I've asked about him and people have explained the Audit Commission is responsible for him. So I thought I'd call you up and let you know. This guy’s exposure is absolutely massive.'

When Mr Scrivener was asked to give a further opinion in relation to the matter, having been made better aware of the scale of the activities of Hammersmith, he advised that if one looked at all of the transactions in their totality, one could not say "these transactions were part and parcel of debt management so as to be lawful". In his judgment, Lord Templeman noted that although the total borrowings of Hammersmith were in the order of £390 million, it had entered into swap transactions with a total aggregate notional principal of £6,052 million.

When the district auditor (Tony Hazell) became aware of the scale of Hammersmith and Fulham's activities in the swap market he brought proceedings to determine whether or not those activities were lawful. Although the case is reported as Hazell against Hammersmith and Fulham, in practice the various banks were joined as third parties, and Hammersmith and Fulham joined with Hazell in arguing that the swaps were unlawful and should not be binding upon them.

The banks were understandably upset that Hammersmith and Fulham were selected to be the test case, given that its activities were at the extreme end of the spectrum. (Note: Despite the banks' ire, this was fairly understandable. Because Hammersmith and Fulham had entered into so many swaps for so many different purposes, it enabled the court to make rulings which would cover the broadest range of scenarios, given it greater value as a test case.) In addition to being upset at the choice of Hammersmith (rather than a council which had made more responsible use of interest rate swaps), the various banks were also reported to have been upset by the decision for the case to be brought in a divisional court rather than in the Commercial Division of the Chancery Court, where a judge might have been expected to have greater familiarity with transactions of this nature.

== Judgment ==
=== Divisional court and Court of Appeal ===
Recognising the importance of the point, the case was heard by two judges at first instance in a divisional court, Woolf LJ and French J. They delivered a judgment on 1 November 1989, and they held that the swap transactions were ultra vires and beyond the powers of the local authorities. It was noted, with no small sense of irony, that "the decision had the bizarre effect of 'benefiting the chief culprit' (Hammersmith), while hurting the more prudent local authorities."

The case was appealed and came before Sir Stephen Brown P, Nicholls LJ and Bingham LJ who handed down their decision on 22 February 1990. The Court of Appeal broadly divided the swap entered into by the local authorities into three different types:

1. Purely speculative swaps, which it held were void;
2. Swaps which were part of managing the local authorities' interest rate exposure under their borrowing, which it held were valid; and
3. Swaps which were entered into by local authorities once it became apparent that earlier swaps might be void to mitigate the damage caused by those void swaps (called the "interim strategy"), which it held were also valid. (Note: The Court of Appeal felt that if a local authority reasonably believed that it was subject to a liability (under the void swaps), then it had the necessary powers to take reasonable steps to mitigate that liability. Even if that meant doing more of what it should not have done in the first place.)

Both at first instance and in the Court of Appeal, the judgments were deliberately handed down at a time when the markets were closed.

The case was then appealed to the House of Lords.

=== House of Lords ===
The main judgment was given by Lord Templeman, with whom all judges agreed. Lord Ackner gave a short concurring judgment. After recounting the facts and describing in brief terms what an interest rate swap contract is, Lord Templeman then expanded upon the facts, noting that the various swaps fell into three categories.

1. The first category was where swaps were entered simply to speculate. In relation to those swaps the banks conceded that they were unlawful.
2. The second category was where swaps were entered into with respect to an existing loan to try and capitalise upon a change in interests. Accordingly, whilst they were also speculative in nature, they did directly relate to an existing loan exposure of the local authority. In the judgment these were referred to as "parallel contracts" or "replacing" interest rates. Lord Templeman noted quickly that "a parallel contract does not in fact replace the interest under the original borrowing and the swap transaction is a speculation no different in quality although different in magnitude from a swap contract which is not entered into by reference to any existing borrowing."
3. The third category related to swaps also entered into in connection with an existing loan, where the local authority sought to use swaps to alter the proportion of the interest which was paid on either a fixed or variable basis through swap contracts. In the judgment these were referred to as "re-profiling". Similarly, Lord Templeman determined fairly immediately in his judgment that these were in his view largely indistinguishable from parallel contracts.

==== Powers of local authorities ====
Having almost immediately stated that all swaps were, in his view, conceptually the same as the types of swap which the banks had admitted were unlawful, Lord Templeman then explored the limits of the powers of local authorities under the Local Government Act 1972. He sought to explore whether the "replace" and "re-profile" swaps could be said to be "calculated to facilitate" or were "conducive to" the power of the local authorities to borrow under section 111 of the statute.

He referred to the judgments of Lord Blackburn and Lord Selborne LC in Attorney-General v Great Eastern Railway Co (1880) 5 App Cas 473 where the House of Lords had held unequivocally that where powers are conferred upon a statutory corporation "what it does not expressly or impliedly authorise is to be taken to be prohibited". He referred further to the decision of Lord Selborne LC in Small v Smith (1884) 10 App Cas 119 where the House of Lords held that granting powers to deal generally in a certain type of business did not mean that there is a potential necessity for entering into all manner of related transactions. Lord Templeman thought that reasoning directly analogous to the case in hand. Finally, Lord Templeman referred to the decision of Lord Loreburn LC in Attorney-General v Mersey Railway Co [1907 AC 415] where he said "The rule of law has been laid down in this House to the effect that it must be shown that the business can fairly be regarded as incidental to or consequential upon the use of the statutory powers." Lord Templeman held that "The same considerations apply in the present case."

Having considered the weight of authority, Lord Templeman noted that, despite its title, debt management is not in itself a function. He also noted that in the case of building societies Parliament has expressly conferred upon them a power to enter into swap transactions. He finally concluded:

In the result, I am of the opinion that a local authority has no power to enter into a swap transaction.

==== The "arcane point" ====
Lord Templeman finally addressed what he referred to as the banks' "arcane" argument. Broadly, that stated that the incorporated Hammersmith and Fulham Borough (representing the concept of inhabitants as a whole group) could only act through the unincorporated Hammersmith and Fulham Borough Council (made up of the mayor and councillors), and though the powers of the council are limited by the Local Government Act 1972, it claimed the borough itself had all the powers of a natural person. The argument conceded that this would not save transactions entered into out of the general rate fund (which would presumably be most of them), but might save transactions funded from other sources. Lord Templeman stated "This argument strikes me as being not so much arcane as absurd." The argument drew on Sutton's Hospital Case (1612) 10 Co Rep 1 that the use of a common seal allowed a corporate to do anything that a natural person might do. This only applies to a corporation created by exercise of the royal prerogative (Riche v Ashbury Railway Carriage and Iron Co (1874) LR 9 Ex 224 at 263). But in the present case, Hammersmith, as a London borough, was a hybrid corporation created by royal charter under the London Government Act 1963.

== Reaction ==
The reaction of banks and financial institutions to the judgment has been described as "furious". Having entered into transactions with local authorities in good faith, the banks now found themselves embroiled in costly litigation to unwind hundreds of financial contracts at great expense. Various suggestions were made that the decision might imperil London's reputation as a financial centre. The reaction of the local authorities is reported to have been mixed; whilst many councils were relieved of potentially large liabilities, their officials had nonetheless effectively been found to have engaged in unlawful conduct. Furthermore, the local authorities also had to face the unpleasant prospect of litigation to unwind the swaps.

Although Hammersmith and its ratepayers were saved from a potentially massive and crippling financial exposure, the picture that the case painted was not at all a pretty one. And, as has been pointed out, for all the criticisms that are made of the chaos that the decision caused, ultimately, the doctrine of ultra vires functioned as it was supposed to – protecting persons (the ratepayers) from the effects of persons wielding executive power in doing things that they were not supposed to do.

The banks made some attempts to have retrospective legislation passed to legalise the swaps, but were not successful in doing so.

== Aftermath ==
The decision led to a torrent of litigation unwinding swap transactions entered into with local authorities. In his judgment Lord Templeman referred to there being "about 400" open swaps between banks and local authorities. Many councils had multiple open positions. (Note: Hammersmith and Fulham LBC had entered into a total of 592 swaps, of which 297 were still open. However, Hammersmith was an outlier and most other councils had far fewer positions in the swap market.) In a subsequent case management hearing, Hirst J indicated that over 200 separate sets legal proceedings were ongoing. These are often collectively referred to as the "swaps cases". Many of these cases were settled before trial, but the cases which were not included:

- Westdeutsche Landesbank Girozentrale v Islington LBC [1996] AC 669, HL
- Kleinwort Benson v Sandwell BC [1994] 4 All ER 890, Hobhouse J
- Kleinwort Benson Ltd v Birmingham City Council [1996] 4 All ER 733, CA
- Kleinwort Benson v South Tyneside MBC [1994] 4 All ER 972, Hobhouse J
- Morgan Grenfell & Co Ltd v Welwyn Hatfield DC [1995] 1 All ER 1, Hobhouse J
- Credit Suisse v Allerdale BC [1997] QB 306
- Kleinwort Benson v Glasgow CC [1997] 4 All ER 641

== See also ==
- United Kingdom constitutional law
- English administrative law
- Local authorities swaps litigation

== Bibliography ==
- McKendrick, Ewan (1997). "Local Authorities and Swaps: Undermining the Market?". In Goode, Royston Miles; Cranston, Ross (eds.). Making Commercial Law: Essays in Honour of Roy Goode. Clarendon Press. pp. 201–238. ISBN 978-0-19-826081-3.
- Campbell-Smith, Duncan (2008). "Closing the Swap Shop, 1988–91". Follow The Money (PDF). Allen Lane. pp. 188–205. ISBN 978-1-84614-068-6. Archived from the original (PDF) on 23 August 2012.
