= Capacity in English law =

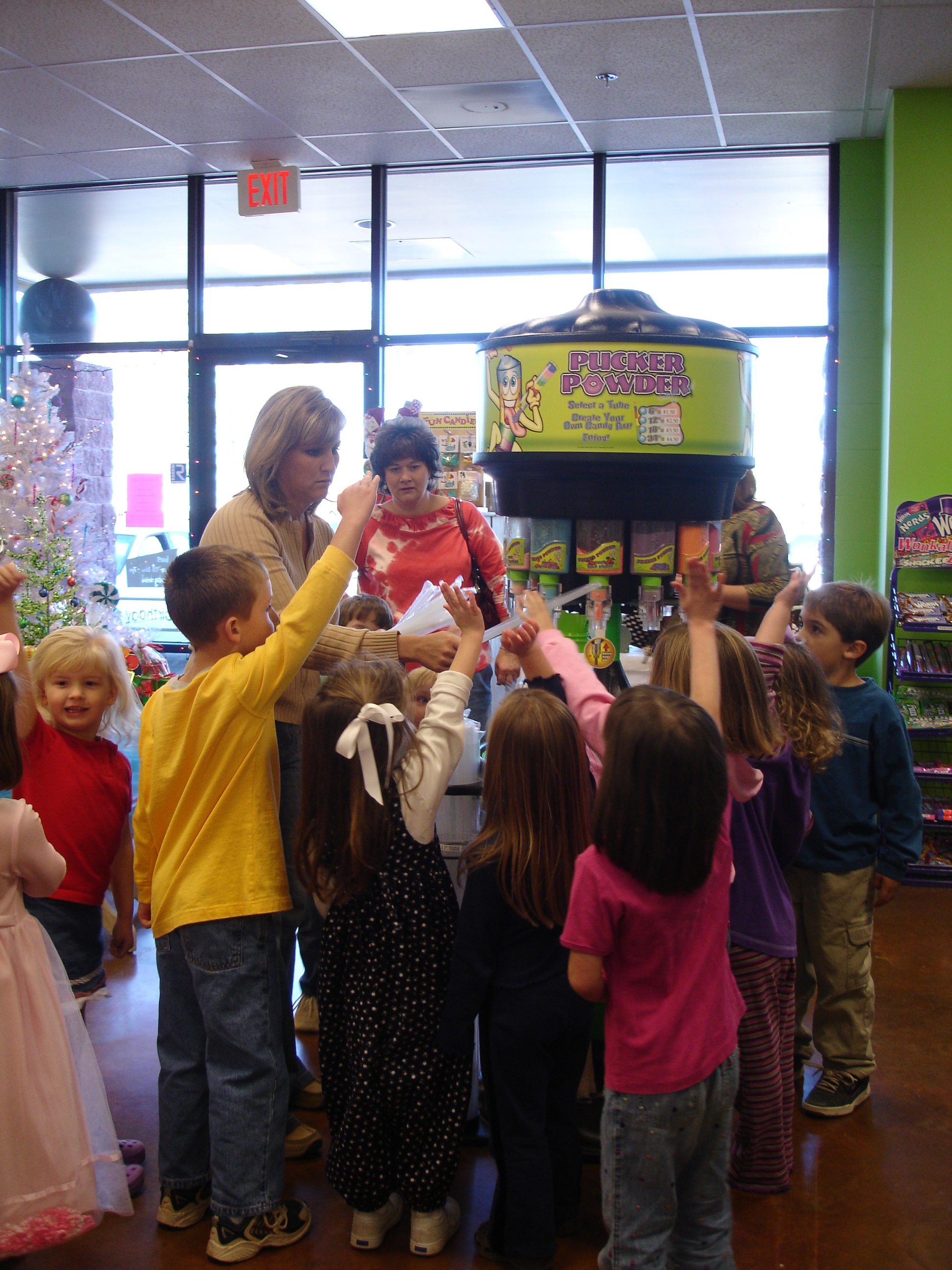
Minors cannot bind themselves to contracts other than those for necessaries, items that are necessary or beneficial to them.

Capacity in English law refers to the ability of a contracting party to enter into legally binding relations. If a party does not have the capacity to do so, then subsequent contracts may be invalid; however, in the interests of certainty, there is a prima facie presumption that both parties hold the capacity to contract. Those who contract without a full knowledge of the relevant subject matter, or those who are illiterate or unfamiliar with the English language, will not often be released from their bargains.

It is recognised however that minors, and those who are deemed mentally incapacitated, may need to be able to create binding agreements when acquiring essential items for living, or for employment. Thus, contracts for necessaries (goods or services deemed necessary for ordinary living) will always be legally binding. Equally, minors have the capacity to enter into contracts for employment, when the terms of such an agreement are of general benefit to them. If not, then they may elect to avoid the contract and have their property returned. Companies were also significantly limited in the range of contracts they could bind themselves to under their objects clause, until reform in the Companies Act 1989. If the directors, or the officers of a company enter an agreement with another person or business, and that agreement is beyond the list of business tasks set under the company's constitution, then the contract will be invalid if the third party in bad faith has knowingly taken advantage of the company. Otherwise, under the Companies Act 2006, the contract will remain valid, and shareholders must sue the director or officer for losses.

== Minors ==
In English contract law, a minor is any individual under the age of 18 years. Historically, the age had been 21, until the Family Law Reform Act 1969. As a general rule, a minor is not bound by contracts he makes, though the adult party whom he contracts with is. Once a minor reaches the age of majority however, he can elect to ratify a contract made as a minor in full capacity. This rule is subject to several types of contracts which a minor will be bound by, and his right to repudiate such contracts.

=== Contracts for necessaries ===
"..the classes being established, the subject-matter and extent of the contract may vary according to the state and condition of the infant himself. His clothes may be fine or coarse according to his rank; his education may vary according to the station he is to fill; and the medicines will depend on the illness with which he is afflicted, and the extent of his probable means when of age. So, again, the nature and extent of the attendance will depend on his position in society."
Alderson B, in Chapple v Anne Cooper (1834) 153 ER 105

Minors are legally bound where a contract supplies them with "necessaries", or goods and services which are deemed necessary or beneficial to them. This obligation is codified in the Sale of Goods Act 1979, in section 3, where it is stated:

Where necessaries are sold and delivered to a minor ... he must pay a reasonable price for them.

A statutory definition of the term "necessary" is provided in section 2(3) of the Sales of Goods Act of Ghana, 1962 (Act 137) which states: "necessaries are goods suitable to the condition in life of the person to whom they are delivered and his actual requirements at the time of the delivery". Whilst the onus of proof that a contract is for necessaries falls upon the supplier, contracts in this form have been found in a wide range of situations, including expensive and far reaching purchases. The definition of necessaries includes obvious purchases, such as food and clothing, but also services or goods which are in furtherance of education or apprenticeship. The necessaries of one minor will not necessarily reflect those of another. The particular circumstances, such as age and immediate needs, may lead to differing outcomes. For example, in Peters v Fleming, it was found that a gold ring and watch chain were necessaries, for the child of a Member of Parliament. However, a contract may not be for necessaries where a minor's needs are adequately satisfied, or a purchase can be seen as unnecessary. This is demonstrated by Nash v Inman, where a tailor's claim that a child's purchase of 11 waistcoats was for necessaries failed, on the grounds that he already owned adequate clothing.

Although it is clear that contracts for necessaries can legally bind minors, the terms of such a contract may defeat it. Where a contract contains particularly burdensome or unfair terms, the courts may decide that a minor does not have the capacity to be bound by them. Where a minor hired a car and crashed it through no fault of his own, the owner could not recover on the grounds that a contract term put the car entirely at the minor's risk.

=== Contracts for employment ===
A minor may enter into a contract for employment, and be bound by it, where it is for his general benefit. Where an infant chose to work under terms which would lower any compensation he may have received for injury, and this was obviously to his disadvantage, he would not be bound by employment. If such terms were held to be generally to his advantage, as he would be insured against more types of accidents, his employment contract would be binding. Equally, where a professional boxer – whilst still an infant – was deprived of pay for a fight (totalling £3,000) for breach of standard boxing rules, such sanctions were enforceable, as the necessity of upholding sporting rules was generally beneficial to him. Where this is not the case, as in De Francesco v Branum, contractual obligations may be void. Here, a girl of 14 contracted with a professional dancer, to become their apprentice. The contract stated that the girl could not accept dancing engagements for herself, and was not required to be paid except for performances she gave. Their agreement was held not to be binding, due to these unreasonable terms.

=== Repudiation ===
Where a minor contracts for the purchase or lease of land, or for a service which carries with it ongoing obligations (such as marriage settlements, or the purchase of shares), such a contract will be binding upon the minor upon reaching the age of majority, should they not choose to repudiate it within a reasonable amount of time. The amount of time which is deemed reasonable is circumstantial, though it is clear from Carnell v Harrison that acting upon an agreement while not knowing of the right to repudiation is not sufficient reason to invalidate a contract. Financial obligations which fall before repudiation are binding on minors. A minor in an agreement to rent a flat may be sued for non-payment of rent. Additionally, in Steinberg v Scala Ltd, the recovery of payments made in a share agreement were denied, only future obligations were extinguished by repudiation.

== Lack of mental capacity ==
In order for an individual to succeed in claiming mental incapacity, they must prove that any impairment was such that they did not understand what they were doing, and that the other party was aware of this. Lord Brightman stated in Hart v O'Connor,

... the validity of a contract entered into by a lunatic who is ostensibly sane is to be judged by the same standards as a contract by a person of sound mind, and is not voidable by the lunatic or his representatives by reason of ‘unfairness' unless such unfairness amounts to equitable fraud which would have enabled the complaining party to avoid the contract even if he had been sane

Such an approach differs from that taken with minors, where the other contracting party need not know they are dealing with a minor, in order to be bound. Whilst there is no absolute standard for a party to be deemed capable of contracting, they must at least know the principles of what they are contracting for, to legally bind themselves. As with minors however, an incapacitated person is bound by statute regarding contracts for necessaries. This obligation falls under Section 7 of the Mental Capacity Act 2005, assuming the role of Section 3 of the Sale of Goods Act 1979. Those incapacitated may also choose to ratify a contract at a later date, if their mental incapacity ends.

Individuals who are clearly intoxicated - by alcohol or otherwise - are generally deemed not to be able to enter legally binding agreements. Lord Ellenborough stated that such persons have "no agreeing mind", though similar principles apply as to those who are otherwise incapacitated. A drunken person can choose to ratify a contract once they are again sober, and under the Sale of Goods Act 1979, they are legally bound with regard to contracts for necessaries.

== Companies ==
Up until reforms in the Companies Act 2006, it was necessary for all companies to spell out the "objects" or the legitimate range of tasks of their business. A company might have an objects clause, for instance "to create software for, and maintain an online encyclopaedia". If companies acted outside their objects then this would be an ultra vires act, and until 1989, this used to make the action wholly void.

The first reported case on the capacity of a corporation was the Case of Sutton's Hospital (1612) 77 Eng Rep 960. That case is difficult to follow, but in Hazell v Hammersmith and Fulham LBC [1992] 2 AC 1 Lord Templeman referred to it, and summarised the decision: "That report, although largely incomprehensible in 1990, has been accepted as 'express authority' that at common law it is an incident to a corporation to use its common seal for the purpose of binding itself to anything which a natural person could bind himself and to deal with its property as a natural person might deal with his own."

That decision was accepted as correct but modified in Ashbury Railway Carriage and Iron Co Ltd v Riche (1875) LR 7 HL 653. In that case the company had the objects clause "to make and sell, or lend on hire, railway-carriages". But then the directors gave out a loan to build railways in Belgium. The House of Lords held, simply, the act was ultra vires and consequently void. This policy was thought to protect shareholders and creditors, whose investments or credit would not be used for an unanticipated purpose by disobedient directors. However, it soon became clear that the ultra vires rule restricted the flexibility of businesses to expand to meet market opportunities. Void contracts might unexpectedly and arbitrarily hinder business. In an attempt to circumvent the rule, companies began to draft ever longer objects clauses, often adding an extra provision stating all objects must be construed as fully separate, or the company's objects include anything directors feel is reasonably incidental to the business.

The first set of reforms, in the Companies Act 1989 was to stipulate that contracts remained valid and third parties were unaffected if an agreement is ultra vires. It is only if a party contracting with a company has acted in callous bad faith with the knowledge that a company exceeded its capacity, that a contract may still cease to be valid. The second set of reforms came in the 2006 Act. Now companies are deemed to have unlimited objects, unless they opt for restrictions. This means companies no longer need to draft massive objects clauses. The 2006 reforms have also clarified the legal position that if a company does have limited objects (which is likely to become increasingly rare), an ultra vires act will cause the directors to have breached a duty to follow the constitution under section 171. So a shareholder who disagreed with an action outside the company's objects must sue directors for any loss.

== See also ==
- Capacity (law)
- English contract law
- UK company law
