= Fly grazing =

Fly grazing is the grazing of animals, such as horses, on land without the permission of the landowner.

== United Kingdom ==
This activity is being controlled in England by the Control of Horses Act 2015. In Wales, the issue is controlled by the Control of Horses (Wales) Act 2014.
