= Cotman v Brougham =

1918 UK company law case

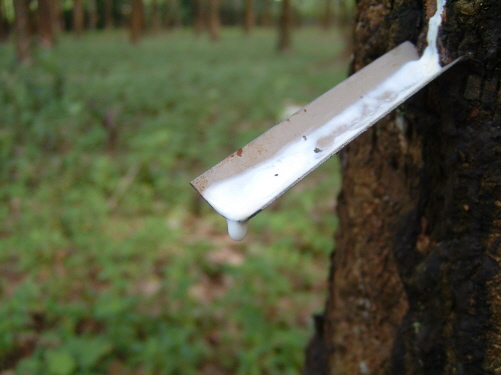
- Court: House of Lords
- Citation: [1918] AC 514

Case opinions
- Lord Finlay LC, Lord Parker, Lord Wrenbury and Lord Atkinson

Keywords
- Objects clause

Cotman v Brougham [1918] AC 514 is UK company law case concerning the objects clause of a company, and the problems involving the ultra vires doctrine. It held that a clause stipulating the courts should not read long lists of objects as subordinate to one another was valid.

This case is now largely an historical artifact, given that new companies no longer have to register objects under the Companies Act 2006 section 31, and that even if they do the ultra vires doctrine has been abolished against third parties under section 39. It is only relevant in an action against a director for breach of duty under section 171 for failure to observe the limits of their constitutional power.

== Facts ==
Essequibo Rubber and Tobacco Estates Limited was registered on 6 April 1910 under the Companies (Consolidation) Act 1908, whose section 3 required a company to register its objects. The company had a huge number of objects and its last clause said that clauses should be read individually and not as subclauses of main clauses. The question was whether the company had the capacity to underwrite (guarantee the value of) an issue of shares in the Anglo-Cuban Oil Bitumen and Asphalt Company Limited.

== Judgment ==
=== Court of Appeal ===
Warrington LJ was sceptical that these objects clauses were intelligible to the public and wondered whether the registrar could refuse.

=== House of Lords ===
Lord Finlay LC relied on subclauses 8 and 12 to say that the company could deal in shares and it was clearly intra vires. He noted section 17 (now Companies Act 2006 section 15(4)) saying the incorporation certificate is conclusive evidence that everything is complied with.

Lord Parker noted the argument that a company should be wound up on the ground that its substratum had failed, but dismissed it. He said the two purposes of the objects were to show subscribers what their money was to be used for and show those who dealt with a company the extent of its powers. The narrower the objects, he opined, the less the subscriber’s risk but the wider the objects, the greater the security of those who contract with the company.

A person who deals with a company is entitled to assume that a company can do everything which it is expressly authorised to do by its memorandum of association, and need not investigate the equities between the company and its shareholders.

Lord Wrenbury and Lord Atkinson concurred.

== See also ==
- Ashbury Railway Carriage & Iron Co Ltd v Riche (1875) LR 7 HL 653
- Bell Houses v City Wall Properties [1966] 2 QB 656, objects clauses can give directors full discretion
- Re Introductions Ltd [1970] Ch 199
