= Insurance Brokers Association of India =

Indian trade association

Insurance Brokers Association of India (I.B.A.I.)
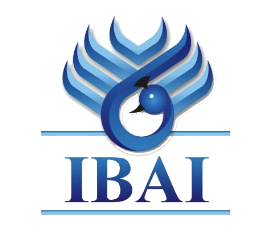
- Insurance Brokers Association of India (IBAI)'s Logo
- Abbreviation: IBAI
- Formation: 2001; 25 years ago
- Type: Trade association
- Legal status: IBAI is a member of Council of Asia Pacific Brokers Association (CAPIBA), the Bombay Chamber of Commerce & Industry, Federation of Indian Chambers of Commerce & Industry (FICCI)
- Purpose: Insurance Brokers and users advocacy
- Headquarters: Mumbai, India
- Location: India wide association
- Region served: India
- Members: All licensed insurance brokers must be members of the IBAI
- President: Sumit Shantilal Bohra
- Vice President: Narendra Kumar Bharindwal
- Secretary: Sundaram Venkatavaradan
- Website: www.ibai.org

Insurance Brokers Association of India (IBAI) is an Indian trade association and regulatory body for insurance brokers in India. All licensed insurance brokers in India must be members of the IBAI Insurance Broker Regulations.

The association was established as a company under Section 25 of the Companies Act, 1956 on 25 July 2001. The IBAI is the sole representative body of licenesed insurance brokers recognised by the Insurance Regulatory and Development Authority of India (IRDAI). As per the Insurance Brokers' Regulations 2002 issued by IRDAI and as amended from time to time (last amended in 2018) it is mandatory for all licensed Brokers to be member of IBAI.

As of 2022, IBAI had 523 members. The main objectives of IBAI is to encourage, promote interaction, facilitate and protect the interests of the members.

IBAI provides members opportunities for further education, training and research in insurance and reinsurance and represent the interests of Brokers with other Industry trade bodies at regional and national level. IBAI is a member of Council of Asia Pacific Brokers Association (CAPIBA), the Bombay Chamber of Commerce & Industry, Federation of Indian Chambers of Commerce & Industry (FICCI)

== History ==
Insurance Brokers Association of India (IBAI) was incorporated as a company under Section 25 of the Companies Act, 1956 vide Certificate of Incorporation No. U 67120 MH 2001 NPL 132860 dated 25 July 2001 with its own Memorandum of Association as well as Articles of Association, as required under the Companies Act, 1956.

The management of the IBAI vests in its board of directors (17 in number) who are elected by the members. The day-to-day functioning is entrusted by the board to those directors who are chosen as office-bearers & the Secretary-General who is appointed by the board.

== Voice of insurance brokers ==
Besides active participation in regulatory mechanisms, IBAI provides as a forum for voice of insurance brokers.

IBAI has been accredited to publishing the first ever policy holders handbook, which ensures no unfair means are resorted either by brokers or by policy holders
