= Morgan Grenfell & Co Ltd v Welwyn Hatfield DC =

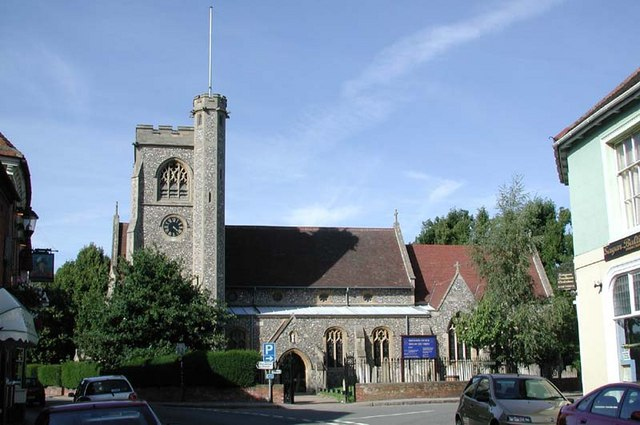
- Court: High Court
- Full case name: Morgan Grenfell & Co Ltd v Welwyn Hatfield District Council (Islington London Borough Council, Third Party)
- Decided: 30 April 1993
- Citation: [1995] 1 All ER 1

Court membership
- Judge sitting: Hobhouse J

Case opinions
- Decision by: Hobhouse J

Keywords
- derivatives, gaming

Morgan Grenfell & Co Ltd v Welwyn Hatfield DC [1995] 1 All ER 1 was a decision of the English High Court relating to the enforceability of financial derivative products under English law, and in particular whether they constituted gaming or wagering contracts under English law. The case essentially operated as a test case for certain key issues in relation to a series of litigation cases relating to swaps entered into between banks and local authorities in the United Kingdom which had been declared to be legally void.

== Background ==
In June 1987 Welwyn Hatfield District Council had entered into a 10-year interest rate swap agreement with Morgan Grenfell based upon a notional principal amount of £25 million. The swap made the usual provisions for netting, with only the balance due being payable by either party on the payment dates.

Welwyn Hatfield DC had also entered into a back-to-back swap with Islington London Borough Council, and Islington LBC was joined to the proceedings as an interested third party. Accordingly, in commercial terms Hatfield Welwyn DC was just acting as an intermediary (for which it effectively received the sum of £210,000) and the net payments would flow through to either Morgan Grenfell or Islington LBC depending upon the movement of interest rates.

In 1989 pursuant to the decision at first instance in Hazell v Hammersmith and Fulham LBC [1990] 2 QB 697 it was held that interest rate swaps were not permitted under the Local Government Act 1972, and therefore were ultra vires with respect to the powers of local authorities in the United Kingdom, and were therefore all void. Thereafter all payments under the swap contract stopped. Morgan Grenfell then commenced proceedings against the District Council to claim back the payments which they had previously made under the void swap contract.

The court ordered than three issues be determined as preliminary issues.

1. Firstly, whether the swaps should be characterised as wagering contracts within section 18 of the Gaming Act 1845 or section 1 of the Gaming Act 1892.
2. Secondly, whether section 63 and paragraph 12 of schedule 1 to the Financial Services Act 1986 affected that conclusion.
3. Thirdly, whether any right to restitution arose if the contracts were held to be a wagering contract.

== Judgment ==
Hobhouse J giving the judgment of the Court, held that an interest rate swap contract had, at least potentially, a speculative character, and was therefore capable of being entered into by two parties for the purposes of wagering on future interest rates. However, he further held that in the context of interest rate swaps entered into by parties or institutions involved in the capital markets and/or the making and receiving of loans, the normal inference was that such contracts were not wagering or gaming, and in the absence of some other consideration, would be given full recognition and effect. The inference would only be rebutted if the purpose and interest of both parties to the transaction was to wager, in which case the contracts would be legally invalid and unenforceable.

The Court followed the decision of Lord Hanworth MR in Earl Ellesmere v Wallace [1929] 2 Ch 1 at 25 where he held that a contract is void as wagering or gaming contract if it is entered into by the parties for no purpose other than wagering or gaming. He also noted that decision of Leggatt LJ in City Index Ltd v Leslie [1992] QB 98 where the Court of Appeal had previously held that "before the 1986 Act came into force, contracts for differences were void, [but] other contracts which were superficially similar were not. These were contracts entered into for a commercial purpose, such as hedging. Such contracts may result in no more than the payment of a difference. But because they were made for a commercial purpose, they are not void as wagering contracts."

The Court went on to consider section 63 of the Financial Services Act 1986. That section provides:

63. Gaming contracts

(1) No contract to which this section applies shall be Void or unenforceable by reason of—

(a) section 18 of the Gaming Act 1845, section 1 of the Gaming Act 1892 or any corresponding provisions in force in Northern Ireland; or
(b) any rule of the law of Scotland whereby a contract by way of gaming or wagering is not legally enforceable.

(2) This section applies to any contract entered into by either or each party by way of business and the making or performance of which by either party constitutes an activity which falls within paragraph 12 of Schedule 1 to this Act or would do so apart from Parts III and IV of that Schedule.

Hobhouse J held that, even if the contract had fallen within the ambit of the Gaming Acts, it would have been a transaction which section 63 of the Financial Services Act 1986 would have applied as it was "entered into by way of business" since, having regard to the overall activities of the parties, the swap had been a business transaction rather than something personal or casual. Although local authorities were not commercial entities, the Court was satisfied that what they were purportedly trying to do in relation to debt management would be understood in any reasonable terms by the man on the street as the conduct of business.

On the third issue the Court noted that the sums paid were already held to be recoverable as money had and received notwithstanding the void nature of the swaps. Would adding an additional layer of invalidity through being a wagering contract have affected that conclusion? The Court noted that in Lipkin Gorman v Karpnale Ltd [1991] 2 AC 548 that payments pursuant to a gaming contract were considered to be gifts and were not recoverable. However, having touched upon the relevant legal analysis, Hobhouse J abruptly stopping, and stated that having held that the swaps were not gaming or wagering contracts, he was not going to answer the third question on a hypothetical basis.

== Commentary ==
Academic commentators have noted that "[t]he general approach taken by Hobhouse J is welcome, but he, like judges before him, does not offer any real guidance as to what the features of a contract are that make it a wagering transaction."

== Notes ==
There was no appeal against the decision at first instance.

Although the judgment was handed down on 30 April 1993, it was not subsequently reported until 1995, and then only in the All England Law Reports (the case is not reported in any of the official reports).
