= Legnam Corporation =

US retailer

Coordinates: 40.91684°N 74.17333°W

Legnam Corporation operated 132 general merchandise stores in 38 of the United States prior to becoming insolvent in June 1932. It sold ladies' apparel. Owing to the financial crisis during the Great Depression, the chain store, formerly known as Mangel's, became unable to pay its debts. The company maintained offices at 1115 Broadway and 226 Main Street in Paterson, New Jersey.

The business was expanding prior to the constrictions brought on by rapid deflation and an absence of consumer spending during the economic downturn.

== Company history ==
On May 7, 1929, the Mangel Corporation declared a quarterly dividend of 1.625 per share on 6½% cumulative preferred stock, payable on June 1, 1929.

Legnam Corporation filed a petition for bankruptcy in the United States Federal District Court on June 29, 1932. The previous day the company changed its name from Mangel's to Legnam by filing a certificate of incorporation with the New Jersey Secretary of State in Trenton, New Jersey.
