= John Hobhouse =

John Hobhouse may refer to:

- John Hobhouse, 1st Baron Broughton (1786–1869)
- John Hobhouse, Baron Hobhouse of Woodborough (1932–2004), British law lord and lawyer
