= Mirvahedy v Henley =

2003 British legal case

Mirvahedy v Henley & Henley
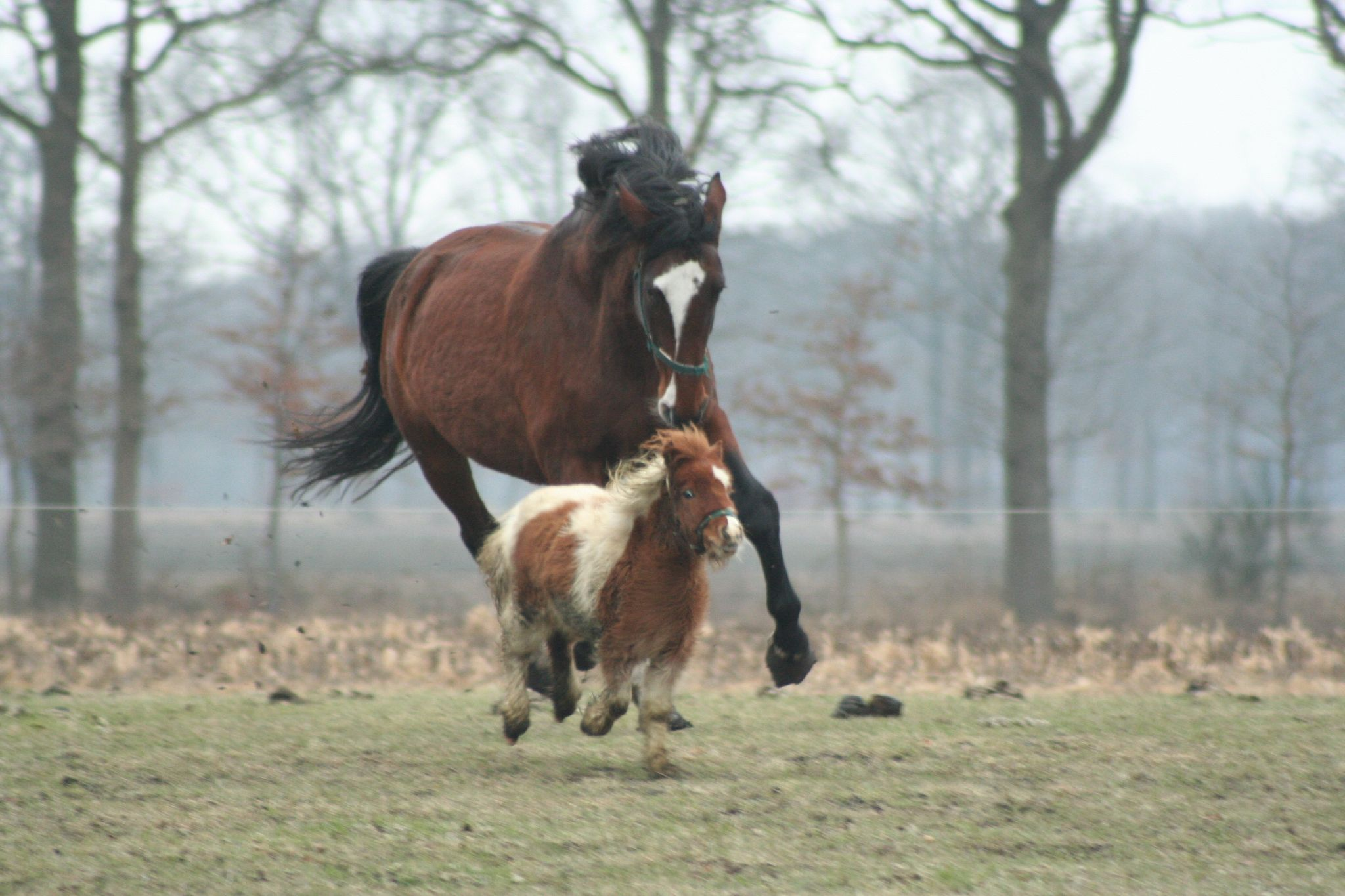
- Court: House of Lords
- Full case name: Hossein Mirvahedy v (1) Andrew Henley and (2) Susan Henley
- Decided: 20 March 2003
- Citation: [2003] UKHL 16
- Transcript: Official transcript

Case history
- Prior action: [2001] EWCA Civ 1749

Court membership
- Judges sitting: Lord Nicholls of Birkenhead; Lord Slynn of Hadley; Lord Hobhouse of Woodborough; Lord Scott of Foscote; Lord Walker of Gestingthorpe

Keywords
- Personal injury, animal liability

Mirvahedy v Henley & Henley [2003] UKHL 16 is a House of Lords case concerning the Animals Act 1971.

== Facts ==
Dr Andrew Henley and his wife Susan kept a horse and two ponies in a field next to their house. On the night of 28–29 August 1996, something frightened the animals, which escaped past a wooden barrier and electrified wire fencing onto a track. They went 300 yards up the track and about a mile along a minor road, and made their way onto the A380 dual carriageway from Torquay to Exeter.

Shortly after midnight, Hossein Mirvahedy, a hotel manager, who was driving along this road, collided with the largest of the horses. Mr Mirvahedy suffered serious injuries for which he sought damages in the courts.

== Law ==
The case turned on Section 2(2) of the Animals Act 1971, which reads as follows:-

Where any damage is caused by an animal which does not belong to a dangerous species, a keeper of the animal is liable for the damage, ... if (b) the likelihood of the damage or of its being severe was due to the characteristics of the animal which are not normally found in animals of the same species or are not normally so found except at particular times or in particular circumstances and (c) those characteristics were known to the keeper or were at any time known to a person who at that time had charge of the animal as at that keeper's servant...

As Lord Nicholls of Birkenhead noted, "Unfortunately the language of section 2(2) is ... opaque. In this instance the parliamentary draftsman's zeal for brevity has led to obscurity. Over the years section 2(2) has attracted much judicial obloquy."

== Courts below ==
In the County Court, Judge O'Malley dismissed Mr Mirvahedy's claim on the grounds that it was not any abnormal or unusual characteristic of the animals that led to the accident. He found that Dr and Mrs Henley had not been negligent because the fencing would normally have been sufficient to contain the horses. In the Court of Appeal, Hale LJ, Keene LJ and Dame Elizabeth Butler-Sloss P overturned this and found Dr and Mrs Henley liable.

== Judgment ==
Reviewing the authorities, the Lords identified two possible interpretations of the 1971 Act, which it called the Cummings interpretation and the Breeden interpretation. In Cummings v Granger 1977 QB 397 an alsatian dog was turned loose in a scrap yard and seriously injured an intruder. Because the intruder was trespassing the dog owner escaped payment of damages, but in that case liability under the Animals Act 1971 was established. In Breeden v Lampard, an unreported case from 1985, the defendant's horse kicked out when it was approached from behind. In that case liability under the Animals Act 1971 was not established. The court found that the defendant's horse was behaving normally.

By a majority of three to two, the House of Lords agreed with the Court of Appeal, preferring the Cummings interpretation.

== Effect ==
Mirvahedy did not establish a general right to compensation from the animal's owner. In the light of Clark v Bowlt [2006] EWCA Civ 978, McKenny v Foster [2008] EWCA Civ 173 and Freeman v Higher Park Farm [2008] EWCA Civ 1185, it is clear that what Mirvahedy established is a second limb to the Animals Act 1971 Section 2(2)(b), covering "temporary characteristics which appear only in identifiable circumstances."
