= Auckland Harbour Board v Commissioner of Inland Revenue =

- Court: Privy Council
- Full case name: Auckland Harbour Board v Commissioner of Inland Revenue
- Decided: 24 January 2001
- Citation: [1999] NZCA 225; (1999) 19 NZTC 15,433
- Transcript: Court of Appeal judgment Privy Council ruling

Court membership
- Judges sitting: Lord Steyn, Lord Hoffman, Lord Cooke of Thorndon, Lord Hope of Craighead, Lord Hobhouse of Woodborough

Auckland Harbour Board v Commissioner of Inland Revenue [1999] NZCA 225; (1999) 19 NZTC 15,433 is a prominent case in New Zealand tax law regarding the issue of tax avoidance.
