= B v Attorney General =

B v. Attorney General
- Court: Privy Council
- Full case name: B & Ors v. Attorney General & Ors
- Decided: 16 July 2003
- Citation: [2003] UKPC 61
- Transcript: Privy Council judgment

Court membership
- Judges sitting: Lord Nicholls of Birkenhead, Lord Hutton, Lord Hobhouse of Woodborough, Lord Rodger of Earlsferry, Lord Walker of Gestingthorpe

Keywords
- negligence

B v Attorney General [2003] UKPC 61 is a cited case in New Zealand regarding negligence cases against the government.

== Background ==
After his wife died, B was left to raise his 2 daughters (referred to as D1 and D2) on his own. At the time, D1 was aged 7, and D2 5.

In July 1988, without any warning, the police informed him that social workers had just collected his daughters from school, and put into their protection due to allegations that he had sexually molested both his daughters, and proceeded to interview him.

However, as the police found no evidence that he had abused his daughters, no criminal charges were ever laid.

B then arranged for his daughters to move back into his house under the care of one of his employees, until his parents from England arrived to care for them.

The subsequent social worker and psychologists investigations, were both later held by the court to be negligently done.

For example, the doctors examination did not reveal any evidence of sexual abuse, the doctor also noted that the girls "told lies", and daughter D2 said the abuse happened in the attic of their house, when it had no attic, D2 said that both had been sexually abused when the other daughter D1 denied any such abuse, and 2 weeks into their care, the D2 admitted to a family friend that she had lied about the abuse happening.

Despite all this contradicting evidence, the daughters were still not allowed back with their father until 9 months later, in April 1989, and this only changed after a protracted 9 week family court hearing.

B then sued the government for $50,000 for exemplary damages, and $500,000 in damages on behalf of his daughters.

The Court of Appeal dismissed his claim, and he appealed.

== Held ==
The Privy Council ruled that B had no arguable claim. However, the daughters claim was still arguable, and their claim was remitted back to the court for arguing.
