= Rolled Steel Products (Holdings) Ltd v British Steel Corp =

Rolled Steel Ltd v British Steel Corp
- Court: Court of Appeal of England and Wales
- Citation: [1986] Ch 246

Case opinions
- Browne-Wilkinson LJ, Slade LJ

Keywords
- Authority, ultra vires, proper purposes

Rolled Steel Products (Holdings) Ltd v British Steel Corp [1986] Ch 246 is a UK company law case, concerning the enforceability of obligations against a company. The case was one of the last significant cases on ultra vires under English company law before the provisions abrogating that doctrine in the Companies Act 1985 became effective.

== Facts ==
Rolled Steel Products Ltd gave security to guarantee the debts of a company called SSS Ltd to British Steel Corporation. This was a purpose that did not benefit Rolled Steel Products Ltd. Moreover, Rolled Steel's director, Mr Shenkman was interested in SSS Ltd (he had personally guaranteed a debt to British Steel’s subsidiary Colvilles, which SSS Ltd owed money to). The company was empowered to grant guarantees under its articles but approval of the deal was irregular because Mr Shenkman's personal interest meant his vote should not have counted for the quorum at the meeting approving the guarantee. The shareholders knew of the irregularity, and so did British Steel. Rolled Steel Products wanted to get out of the guarantee, and was arguing it was unenforceable either because it was ultra vires, or because the guarantee had been created without proper authority.

At first instance Vinelott J held British Steel’s knowledge of the irregularity rendered the guarantee ultra vires, void and incapable of validation with the members’ consent. British Steel appealed.

== Judgment ==
The Court of Appeal held that the transaction was not ultra vires and void. Simply because a transaction is entered for an improper purpose does not make it ultra vires. He emphasised the distinction between an act which is entered into for an improper purpose (which is not beyond the capacity of a company, or void) and an act which is wholly outside a company's objects (and hence ultra vires and void). However, it was unenforceable because British Steel, with knowledge of the irregularity, could not rely on a presumption of regularity in the company’s internal management. Since British Steel ‘constructively knew’ about the lack of authority, they could acquire no rights under the guarantee. On ultra vires Browne-Wilkinson LJ said the following.

The critical distinction is, therefore, between acts done in excess of the capacity of the company on the one hand and acts done in excess or abuse of the powers of the company on the other. If the transaction is beyond the capacity of the company it is in any event a nullity and wholly void: whether or not the third party had notice of the invalidity, property transferred or money paid under such a transaction will be recoverable from the third party. If, on the other hand, the transaction (although in excess or abuse of powers) is within the capacity of the company, the position of the third party depends upon whether or not he had notice that the transaction was in excess or abuse of the powers of the company. As between the shareholders and the directors, for most purposes it makes no practical difference whether the transaction is beyond the capacity of the company or merely in excess or abuse of its power: in either event the shareholders will be able to restrain the carrying out of the transaction or hold liable those who have carried it out. Only if the question of ratification by all the shareholders arises will it be material to consider whether the transaction is beyond the capacity of the company since it is established that, although all the shareholders can ratify a transaction within the company's capacity, they cannot ratify a transaction falling outside its objects.

In this judgment I therefore use the words "ultra vires" as covering only those transactions which the company has no capacity to carry out, i.e., those things the company cannot do at all as opposed to those things it cannot properly do.

The two badges of a transaction which is ultra vires in that sense are (1) that the transaction is wholly void and (consequentially) (2) that it is irrelevant whether or not the third party had notice. It is therefore in this sense that the transactions in In re David Payne & Co Ltd [1904] 2 Ch 608 and Charterbridge Corporation Ltd v Lloyds Bank Ltd [1970] Ch. 62 were held not to be ultra vires. The distinction between the capacity of the company and abuse of powers was also drawn by Oliver J in In re Halt Garage (1964) Ltd [1982] 3 All ER 1016, 1034. I consider the reasoning of the decision in In re Lee, Behrens and Co Ltd [1932] 2 Ch. 46 to be wrong for the reasons given by Pennycuick J. in the Charterbridge case [1970] Ch 62: the decision itself can only be justified (if at all) on the footing that the widow who was granted a pension had notice of the impropriety of the grant...

On the question of authority Slade LJ held that the Rule in Turquand's case, which would ordinarily entitle a person dealing with a company who to assume the company's own internal rules were complied with, did not apply when it came to someone breaching a rule to further their own personal interests.

The signed minutes of the board meeting of that day, a copy which was subsequently supplied to Colvilles' solicitors (and indeed had been drafted by them), made no mention whatever of any declaration of a personal interest by Mr. Shenkman. Since Colvilles and its legal advisers must be taken to have had knowledge of the relevant provisions of the plaintiff's articles, they must also be taken to have known that the resolution could not have been validly passed unless Mr. Shenkman had duly declared his personal interest at that board meeting or a previous board meeting.

If, therefore, the defendants are to be allowed both to take and succeed on the Turquand's case point, this must mean that, in the circumstances subsisting in late January 1969, they were as a matter of law entitled to assume (contrary to the fact and without further inquiry) that Mr. Shenkman had duly declared his personal interest either at the board meeting of 22 January 1969 or at some previous board meeting of the plaintiff.

This contention might well have been unanswerable if the rule in Turquand's case, 6 E. & B. 327 were an absolute and unqualified rule of law, applicable in all circumstances. But, as the statement of the rule quoted above indicates, it is not. It is a rule which only applies in favour of persons dealing with the company in good faith. If such persons have notice of the relevant irregularity, they cannot rely on the rule.

== See also ==
- UK company law
- Capacity in English law
- Agency in English law
- First EU Company Law Directive 68/151/EEC
- Hartog v Colin & Shields [1939] 3 All ER 566
- Howard v Patent Ivory Manufacturing Co (1888) 38 Ch D 156
- Morris v Kanssen [1946] AC 459, a presumption of irregularity cannot be relied on by company officers
