= Case of Sutton's Hospital =

1612 UK common law case

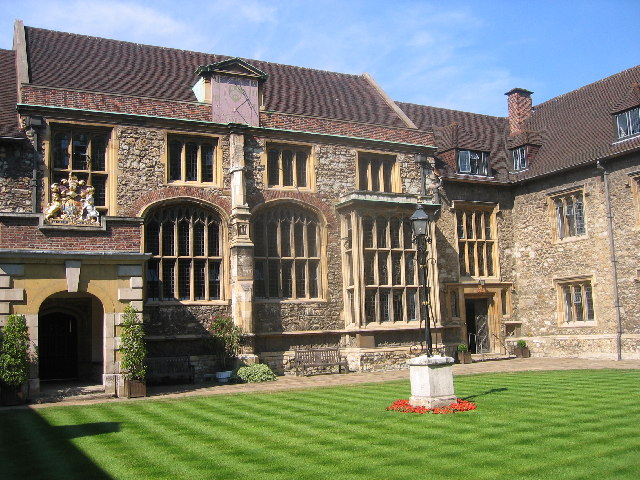
- Court: Court of Exchequer Chamber
- Citation: (1612) 77 Eng Rep 960; (1612) 10 Rep 32; (1612) 10 Co Rep 23a

Court membership
- Judge sitting: Sir Edward Coke

Keywords
- Corporations, legal personality

Case of Sutton's Hospital (1612) 77 Eng Rep 960 is an old common law case decided by Sir Edward Coke. It concerned the London Charterhouse, which was held to be a properly constituted corporation.

== Facts ==
Thomas Sutton was a coal mine owner and moneylender, as well as the Master of Ordnance for the North of England, a military position. He founded a school and hospital as a corporation at the London Charterhouse. When he died, he left a large part of his estate to the charity. Sutton's other heirs challenged the bequest by arguing that the charity was improperly constituted. Therefore, they argued, it lacked a legal personality to be the subject of a transfer of property.

== Judgment ==
In a full hearing of the King's Bench, it was held that the incorporation was valid, as was the subsequent foundation of the charity and so the transfer of property to it, including the nomination of a master of the charity to receive the donation, was not void.

Sir Edward Coke wrote in the report the following.

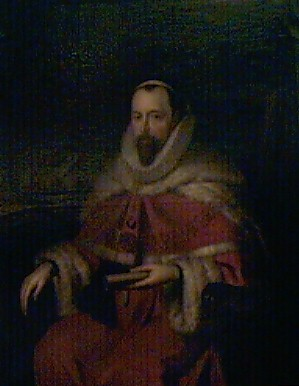
Sir Edward Coke.

And it is great reason that an Hospital in expectancy or intendment, or nomination, shall be sufficient to support the name of an Incorporation, when the Corporation itself is onely in abstracto, and resteth onely in intendment and consideration of the Law; for a Corporation aggregate of many is invisible, immortal, & resteth only in intendment and consideration of the Law; and therefore cannot have predecessor nor successor. They may not commit treason, nor be outlawed, nor excommunicate, for they have no souls, neither can they appear in person, but by Attorney. A Corporation aggregate of many cannot do fealty, for an invisible body cannot be in person, nor can swear, it is not subject to imbecilities, or death of the natural, body, and divers other cases.

== Citations ==
The case has been cited in a number of subsequent decisions. Notably, in Hazell v Hammersmith and Fulham LBC [1992] 2 AC 1, Lord Templeman referred to it, and although he acknowledged it to be good law, he also noted that to modern eyes the language was so impenetrable that most lawyers simply took it on faith that the case stood for the principle for which it is cited. He summarised the ratio decidendi of the case thus:

That report, although largely incomprehensible in 1990, has been accepted as "express authority" that at common law it is an incident to a corporation to use its common seal for the purpose of binding itself to anything which a natural person could bind himself and to deal with its property as a natural person might deal with his own.

The case was also cited with approval (but distinguished) in another House of Lords case, Ashbury Railway Carriage and Iron Co Ltd v Riche (1875) LR 7 HL 653.

== See also ==
- UK company law
- Salomon v A Salomon & Co Ltd [1897] AC 22
- Lennard's Carrying Co Ltd v Asiatic Petroleum Co Ltd [1915] AC 705
- United States corporate law
- Trustees of Dartmouth College v. Woodward, 17 US 518 (1819)
- Paul v. Virginia, 75 US 168 (1869), a corporation was not a citizen within the meaning of the Privileges and Immunities Clause
- Santa Clara County v. Southern Pacific Railroad Company, 118 US 394 (1886) in a property tax case, the US Supreme Court holds that corporations are obviously "persons" with the meaning of the Fourteenth Amendment
- Citizens United v. Federal Election Commission, 130 S.Ct. 876 (2010) corporations are persons under the First Amendment and hence have the unlimited right to produce campaigning material at election times
