= Berezovsky v Michaels =

- Court: House of Lords
- Full case name: Berezovsky v Michaels and Others, Glouchkov v Michaels and Others
- Decided: 11 May 2000
- Citations: [2000] UKHL 25; [2000] 2 All ER 986; [2000] 1 WLR 1004

Case history
- Prior action: Berezovsky v Forbes Inc (No. 1) [1999] E.M.L.R. 278
- Subsequent action: Berezovsky v Forbes Inc (No. 2) [2001] E.M.L.R. 45

Court membership
- Judges sitting: Lord Steyn; Lord Nolan; Lord Hoffmann; Lord Hope of Craighead; Lord Hobhouse of Woodborough

Keywords
- Libel, defamation, choice of forum

Berezovsky v Michaels is an English libel decision in which the House of Lords allowed Boris Berezovsky and Nikolai Glushkov to sue Forbes (via editor James Michaels) for libel in UK courts, despite the allegedly libelous material relating to their activities in Russia.

The case was also reported as Berezovsky v Forbes Inc.

== Facts ==
The 30 December 1996 edition of Forbes described the plaintiffs, Boris Berezovsky and Nikolai Glushkov, as "criminals on an outrageous scale." According to the judgment, the circulation of this issue was as follows:

	Subscriptions	Newsstands	Total
United States & Canada	748,123	37,587	785,710
England & Wales	566	1,349	1,915
Russia	13	0	13

The parties also agreed that, given online availability, the issue would have had about 6,000 readers in the UK.

Despite these relative circulation numbers, the plaintiffs brought their action in the UK.

== Proceedings ==
At first instance, Popplewell J held that where a party was not subject to a jurisdiction, it was for the court to determine the appropriate forum (citing Spiliada Maritime Corp v Cansulex Ltd [1987] A.C. 460). It was found that the plaintiffs' connection with England was "tenuous", and Popplewell stayed the proceedings. After the plaintiffs provided further evidence of their connection with England on appeal, the Court of Appeal overturned the decision, and held that, per the Spilada test, as there was strong evidence of the plaintiffs' connection with England, England was a suitable forum for the trial.

== Judgment ==
The House of Lords upheld the Court of Appeal's decision by a 3–2 majority (Lord Hoffmann and Lord Hope of Craighead dissenting), dismissing the appeals, and finding that on the additional evidence provided England was an appropriate forum and the trial of actions should proceed in England.

In his dissent, Lord Hoffmann observed:

The plaintiffs are forum shoppers in the most literal sense. They have weighed up the advantages to them of the various jurisdictions that might be available and decided that England is the best place in which to vindicate their international reputations. They want English law, English judicial integrity and the international publicity which would attend success in an English libel action.

== Significance ==
Scholars and commentators have suggested that the case made the UK more popular for libel tourism.
