= Animals Act 1971 =

Act of the Parliament of the United Kingdom

Animals Act 1971 (Note: Section 13(1).)
- Act of Parliament
- Parliament of the United Kingdom
- Long title: An Act to make provision with respect to civil liability for damage done by animals and with respect to the protection of livestock from dogs; and for purposes connected with those matters.
- Citation: 1971 c. 22
- Introduced by: Sir Arthur Irvine, Solicitor General (Commons)
- Territorial extent: England and Wales (Note: Section 13(4).)

Dates
- Royal assent: 12 May 1971
- Commencement: 1 October 1971 (Note: Section 13(3).)

Other legislation
- Amends: Dogs Act 1906; Dogs (Amendment) Act 1928; Crown Proceedings Act 1947
- Amended by: Fatal Accidents Act 1976; Limitation Act 1980; Commons Act 2006; Control of Horses Act 2015

Status: Amended

Text of statute as originally enacted

Revised text of statute as amended

Text of the Animals Act 1971 as in force today (including any amendments) within the United Kingdom, from legislation.gov.uk.

The Animals Act 1971 (c. 22) is an act of the Parliament of the United Kingdom the purpose of which was to codify civil liability for damage done by animals in England and Wales.

Section 1 broadly provides for the abolition of common law torts relating to cattle trespass and to the old common law scienter action with respect to animals which are ferae naturae or otherwise known to be vicious, as well as the abrogation of statutory provisions relating to civil liability in the Dogs Act 1906 (6 Edw. 7. c. 32).

The provisions largely codify the pre-existing common law rules.

== Case law ==
The leading case on the act is the House of Lords decision in Mirvahedy v Henley [2003] UKHL 16. In that case Lord Nicholls of Birkenhead commented, "Unfortunately the language of section 2(2) is ... opaque. In this instance the parliamentary draftsman's zeal for brevity has led to obscurity. Over the years section 2(2) has attracted much judicial obloquy."

The statute has been further considered by the Court of Appeal on several occasions, including Clark v Bowlt [2006] EWCA Civ 978, McKenny v Foster [2008] EWCA Civ 173 and Freeman v Higher Park Farm [2008] EWCA Civ 1185.
