= Nash v Inman =

1908 English contract law case about minors

- Court: King's Bench
- Decided: 5 March 1908
- Citation: [1908] 2 KB 1

Case history
- Prior actions: Trial before Ridley J., who found in favour of the defendant
- Subsequent action: None

Court membership
- Judges sitting: Cozens-Hardy M.R., Fletcher Moulton L.J., Buckley L.J.

Case opinions
- In an action against an infant for necessaries the onus is on the plaintiff to prove, not only that the goods supplied were suitable to the condition in life of the infant, but that he was not sufficiently supplied with goods of that class at the time of the sale and delivery.

Keywords
- Infant; Necessaries; Actual Requirements; Evidence; Onus of Proof

Nash v Inman was a 1908 court case heard in the King's Bench. It concerned a minor's capacity to make contracts under English law.

== Summary ==
Nash was a tailor working in Savile Row. Inman was a minor studying at Cambridge University. Nash sold clothing on credit—including eleven waistcoats described by Buckley LJ as "of an extravagant and ridiculous style having regard to the position of the boy"—to Inman for approximately £145. Nash sued to recover the money, and Inman pleaded infancy.

After hearing evidence, the trial judge held that Inman was actually a minor and that he already had enough clothing at the time of sale. For this reason, the trial judge found that there was no evidence that the clothing could possibly be considered to be in the class of necessaries, and directed the jury to enter judgment in favour of Inman. Nash appealed, claiming that the judge had decided the issues of fact, instead of letting the jury decide.

Each of the three members of the Court agreed that the trial judge was correct in ordering judgment to be entered for the defendant, but each gave a separate opinion.

=== Cozens-Hardy MR ===
The Infants’ Relief Act, 1874 and the Sale of Goods Act, 1893 set up a situation where minors' contracts are absolutely void, except those for necessaries. To recover money from a minor's contract for necessaries, it is not enough to show that the goods were suitable to the infant's condition in life, one must also show that the minor was not sufficiently supplied at the time. As no evidence has been introduced to suggest that the goods were necessaries, the trial judge's decision was correct.

ARGUMENT ON PLAINTIFF. It is not strictly correct to say that a minor contracts for necessaries. Rather, such an action against a minor is based upon the idea of quantum meruit. The plaintiff must always make out their case, which means that they must show that the goods were not only suitable to the minor's condition in life, but also that they were not sufficiently supplied at the time. The jury should decide issues of fact, but the judge should not put a question to the jury if there is no evidence upon which they could reasonably find in the affirmative. There is no such reasonable evidence in this case.

MINORS AGREEMENT. Any contract with a minor is void. A minor may contract for necessaries at a reasonable price, but it will not be enforceable unless they are necessary to his station in life and he does not already have enough. If either of these things are disputed, the onus is on the plaintiff to prove them. The judge must determine whether the goods are capable of being necessaries as a matter of law, and if they are so capable, let the jury decide whether they are in fact necessaries. In this case, there was no evidence that the goods were capable of being necessaries, so the trial judge was correct in not giving the question to the jury for their decision.

== See also ==
- Capacity in English law
