= Local authorities swaps litigation =

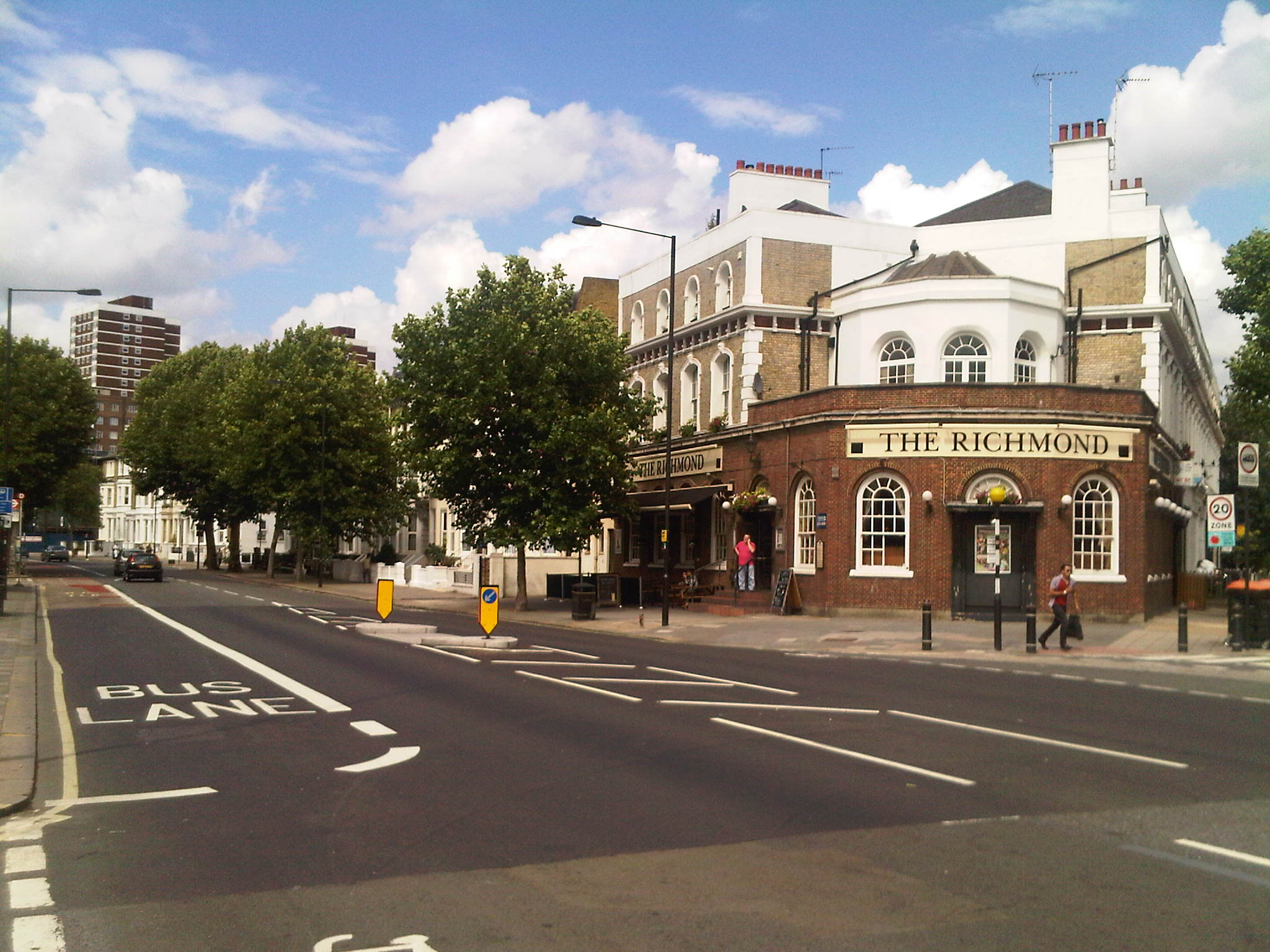
Hammersmith and Fulham, where the genesis of the local authorities swaps litigation began.

The local authorities swaps litigation (sometimes called simply the swaps cases) refers to a series of cases during the 1990s under English law relating to interest rate swap transactions entered into between banks and local authorities. The House of Lords ruled that such transactions were unlawful. As a result of the decision over 200 separate actions were filed as hundreds of interest rate swap contracts had to be unwound by the courts at great expense.

The law relating to recovery of payments made under contracts subsequently held to be legally void was relatively undeveloped at the time, and the numerous cases led to a rapid evolution in terms of the development and understanding of the English law of restitution and unjust enrichment. Many of the subsequent cases were appealed to the Court of Appeal and three were appealed all the way to the House of Lords. In the course of those proceedings, in addition to the development of English law of unjust enrichment, numerous long established legal precedents of general application were overturned.

The situation was described as a "debacle", and the final costs were enormous. There is no accurate record of the total legal costs over the totality of the legal actions, but the banks were estimated to have written off £600 million as either unrecoverable or compromised as part of the litigation. No one has tried to produce estimates for any corresponding losses to the local authorities.

== Background ==
=== Local authority borrowing and hedging ===
Local government in the United Kingdom is devolved to various different types of political subdivisions, but these were generally collectively referred to as "local authorities" in the litigation. These local authorities raise money through local taxation (at the time of the swaps litigation this was rates; it has subsequently been replaced by council tax). Local authorities also have limited powers to borrow money in order to fund capital projects and defray the cost over future years. These powers to borrow are carefully circumscribed in the Local Government Act 1972.

In the early 1980s a number of local authorities began to use interest rate swaps in order to hedge their exposure to interest rate fluctuations in relation to their borrowing. Interest rate swaps were still a relatively new commercial innovation at the time. Following the volatility of global interest rates in the 1970s, interest rate swaps became an increasingly popular way for borrowers to manage the risk of future volatility affecting their payment obligations. Although most of the subsequent reporting focused upon a few local authorities who were less circumspect, it appears that in the majority of cases local authorities used interest rate swaps in a prudent and measured manner as part of their financial management function.

=== The position of Hammersmith and Fulham LBC ===
The position of Hammersmith and Fulham London Borough Council was quite different from most of the other local authorities. From about 1985 onwards Hammersmith had entered into interest rate swap transactions on an extremely large scale. At one stage it was calculated that Hammersmith was a counterparty to 0.5% of the global trade in swaps, and 10% of the sterling denominated trade. Moreover, quite exceptionally, all of Hammersmith's positions in the swap market were betting on a fall in interest rates. Most large participants in the swap market have their exposure balanced by taking positions on both sides and across multiple currencies, but Hammersmith was essentially repeatedly entering into one-way bets that sterling interest rates would fall; a bet that they would end up losing spectacularly when interest rates climbed from around 8 per cent to 15 per cent in the space of ten months.

From subsequent reports of events, it is not at all clear that Hammersmith had any real idea what they were doing. Each time they entered into an interest rate swap they would receive a premium. They would then treat this as additional funding which they could spend on providing services. Any liabilities payable under the swaps (including the eventual repayment of the premium) would only arise at a later date.

=== The problem coming to light ===
Responsibility for monitoring the finances of the local authorities comes under the various district auditors, who are appointed by, but do not actually report to, the Audit Commission (and the Audit Commission in turn worked in partnership with, but operated independently of, a number of central government departments). Although during the 1980s the Audit Commission had become increasingly concerned about the use of financial derivatives, it had never taken any steps to prevent this other than simply advocating that local authorities use caution. But in June 1988 they would discover not all local authorities had heeded that advice. At that time a new team member had recently relocated to the London swaps desk of Goldman Sachs, and almost immediately she noticed that (a) Hammersmith Council had entered into an absolutely massive number of swaps with the bank, and (b) that all of them were entered on the same side, i.e. betting that interest rates would fall. She telephoned the Audit Commission's office and explained her concerns. The Audit Commission then telephoned the council's district auditor, Mr Tony Hazell at Deloitte, who asserted that he had no idea about any significant swaps exposure on the part of the local authority. The Audit Commission then telephoned the council's chief executive, who confirmed that the council had been entering into swaps, but did not think that it had any significant exposure. The chief executive reportedly then stated: "I really wouldn't worry about this ... everybody knows that interest rates are going to fall." Upon hearing this, which the Audit Commission took for confirmation that Hammersmith's exposure was in fact entirely unhedged, teams from both the Audit Commission and the district auditor were sent in to investigate.

Although it would take months to fully understand the position, it soon became apparent that Hammersmith had been entering into swaps and other transactions recklessly on a massive scale simply to collect the premiums (although those premiums would all be repayable over the life of – or at the end of – the swap). The situation was bad enough when the Audit Commission and the district auditor began to examine it, but it would get worse. Despite the council initially promising to suspend entering into new transactions, they would later backtrack on that, and state that they "would not preclude further selective trades as 'the most prudent response to the present uncertain position'" They then started to embark on ever more frantic trading in derivatives – at a rate of more than one per business day – trying to trade out of trouble. According to the judgment later delivered by the House of Lords, by the time the curtain came down even though the total borrowings of Hammersmith were in the order of £390 million, it had entered into swap transactions with a total aggregate notional principal of over £6 billion.

Moreover, it was not clear that the executive of the council ever knew what their finance department was doing, or that the finance department which was entering into the trades truly understood the nature of the transactions they were entering into. Hammersmith Council started entering derivatives in 1983 (although the significant exposures did not start until 1985), but it was not until several years later before they even approached their own internal legal team, and they never sought any external advice until the very end. The Audit Commission's in-house lawyer, Tony Child, expressed the view that the finance officers simply never really understood what it was that they were doing. In his review of the crisis, Duncan Campbell Smith remarked that the ineptitude of Hammersmith Council as a whole seemed staggering:

Over the following six months, Hammersmith compounded the managerial ineptitude that had already brought it to the brink of disaster. As an illustration of just how badly a local authority could be run, it might almost have been designed to accompany the first two of the Commission's Management Papers. Neither the leader of the council nor any of its elected members had any idea what was happening in their finance department.

The Audit Commission also worked to find out how many other local authorities – other than Hammersmith – had an exposure. It transpired that a total of 137 did. However, it appeared that for the most part their swaps transaction was measured and commensurate with respect to their borrowing.

== Hazell v Hammersmith LBC ==
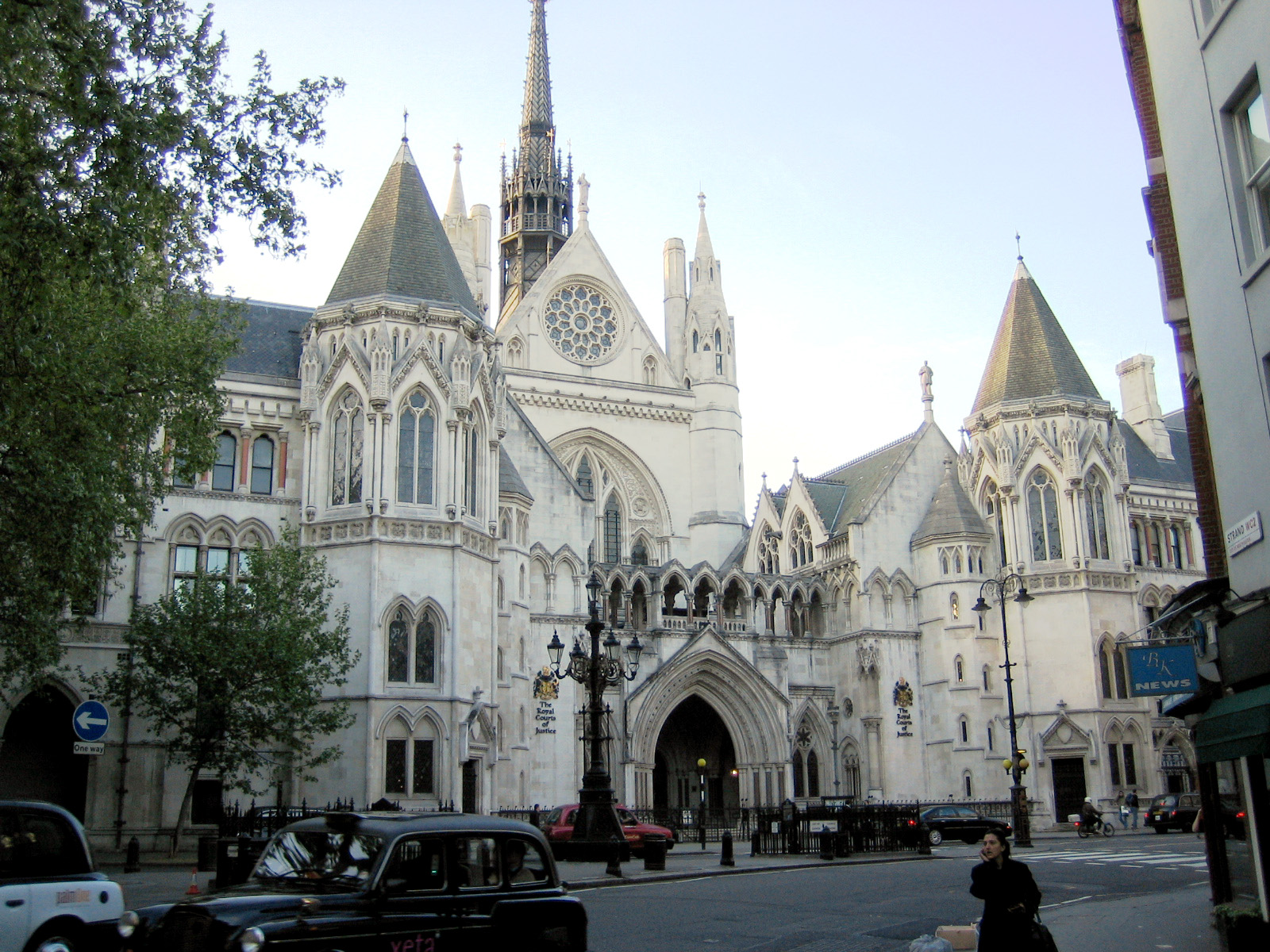
The legality of the local authority swap transactions came before the High Court of Justice (pictured) in Autumn of 1989.

The Audit Commission sought legal advice in relation to the legality of the swaps. Two opinions were received from barristers. One junior counsel opined that all swaps were unlawful and void. The second, from Roger Henderson QC, expressed the opinion that use of swaps to hedge their own borrowing by a local authority was lawful, but not swaps for speculative trading. Separately Hammersmith also obtained an opinion from a barrister, Anthony Scrivener QC, who also opined that swaps to hedge an exposure would be lawful, but for any other purpose would not be. However, the solicitor to the Audit Commission, Tony Child, advised the Commission that, contrary to the opinions of the two barristers, the district auditors should take the position that all derivatives contracts with local authorities were unlawful.

The banks did not react well to this decision, and legal proceedings were issued. In a quirk of legal procedure, the case was commenced as Tony Hazell (as district auditor) against Hammersmith and Fulham LBC, alleging that they had engaged in unlawful practices. However, because of their financial interest in the ruling, five lead banks were named as third party respondents. Hammersmith itself barely participated in the trial and did not actively oppose the district auditor. In reality, the case was fought between the Audit Commission and the banks.

=== Divisional court ===
The case was heard by two judges at first instance in the divisional court, Lord Justice Woolf and Mr Justice French. In those proceedings the banks conceded that speculative swaps were unlawful, but urged the court that swaps entered into to hedge against exposure arising from borrowing should be a lawful extension of the power of local authorities to borrow. The court delivered its judgment on 1 November 1989, and held that all of the swap transactions were ultra vires and beyond the powers of the local authorities. It was noted that "the decision had the bizarre effect of 'benefiting the chief culprit' (Hammersmith), while hurting the more prudent local authorities."

=== Court of Appeal ===
The case was appealed, and came before Sir Stephen Brown, Lord Justice Nicholls and Lord Justice Bingham who handed down their decision on 22 February 1990. The Court of Appeal broadly divided up the transactions entered into by the local authorities into three different types:

1. Purely speculative swaps, which it held were void;
2. Swaps which were part of managing the local authorities' interest rate exposure under their borrowing, which it held were valid; and
3. Swaps which were entered into by local authorities once it became apparent that earlier swaps might be void to mitigate the damage caused by those void swaps (called the "interim strategy"), which it held were also valid.

The decision of the Court of Appeal was received with relief in the City of London. A column in the Financial Times noted "overseas financial institutions can feel more confident that City deals will not be sabotaged by arcane UK laws. The integrity of the markets has been preserved, without allowing the banks to escape the consequences of their foolishness in over-trading with Hammersmith and Fulham."

=== House of Lords ===
The case was then appealed to the House of Lords. The main judgment was given by Lord Templeman, with whom all judges agreed. Having almost immediately stated that all swaps were, in his view, conceptually the same as the speculative types of swap which the banks had admitted in argument were unlawful, Lord Templeman then explored the limits of the powers of local authorities under the Local Government Act 1972. Having considered various cases, Lord Templeman noted that, despite its title, debt management is not in itself a function. He also noted that in the case of building societies Parliament has expressly conferred upon them a power to enter into swap transactions, but no similar steps had been taken in relation to local authorities. He finally concluded:

In the result, I am of the opinion that a local authority has no power to enter into a swap transaction.

=== Reaction ===
The banks were reported to be "furious" and referred to the decision as "incomprehensible". The written evidence later submitted by the Bank of England to the Treasury and Civil Service Committee about the affair noted (at paragraph 3.4) that it "has caused considerable damage to the reputation of the City of London among counterparties who entered into swap transactions with local authorities in good faith during the period." Most local authorities had mixed views; although many were exculpated from potential liabilities, they also faced the prospect of long and expensive litigation unwinding the swaps. Furthermore, they were now shut out of the swaps market completely, regardless of how prudent they had been. The Audit Commission mostly felt relief and vindication. The council members at Hammersmith and Fulham were unsure how to react; they wanted to take credit for striking a blow against financial capitalism, but this was at odds with the evidence that they had been oblivious to what their finance department had been doing.

The banks made a brief but concerted effort to have retrospective legislation passed validating the swaps, but were "robustly" rebuffed by the Chancellor of the Exchequer, Norman Lamont. The government was reported to have a sense of frustration that despite trying to close loopholes in relation to financing of local authorities, the banks had kept working around them and had subsequently received their comeuppance.

== Subsequent litigation ==
One of the principles of English law embodied in a Latin maxim is fiat justitia ruat caelum ("let justice be done though the heavens fall"). That may be an apt description for the effect of the decision in Hazell v Hammersmith and Fulham LBC. Although the courts are often circumspect about handing down judgments which cause significant further litigation under the so-called floodgates principle, the decision of the House of Lords sparked off hundreds of further legal actions seeking recovery of payments made under the invalid swap contracts.

The litigation involving those contracts was made even more complex because the area of law which regulates recover of payments is the law of restitution. However, at the time this area of the law was still regarded a relatively academic subject, and many of the legal concepts had not been fully explored in practice. Perhaps unsurprisingly, with that amount of litigation, the various aspects of the law of restitution got significant further consideration from judges, practitioners and academics alike. Professor Ewan McKendrick would later note that the swaps litigation had been instrumental in developing the modern law of restitution in England.

== Aftermath ==
The costs of the litigation were substantial. There is no accurate record of the total legal expenditure which was involved in the hundreds of lawsuits. The total number of writs issued relating to the swaps litigation is not recorded. But of all the writs which were issued many of them were settled quickly, and "only" 150–200 were contested.

Mr Justice Evans as the Presiding judge of the Commercial Court took "unprecedented action" in terms of coordinating between the cases and their advisers to ensure that certain lead cases were selected and heard first, enabling other parties to see the court's position on certain issues with a view to trying to reach settlement. Six lead actions were selected to be heard by Mr Justice Steyn, and a costs-sharing order was made so that the costs of those lead actions were defrayed among the parties to other cases held back pending the decisions.

In most of these actions the banks were the claimants. Partly this was because the local authorities were often "out of the money" on the swaps because of the rise in interest rates which occurred, but also because local authorities had often received up-front premiums which were to repaid over the course of the transaction. Many of the local authorities agreed to, or were ordered to, repay the sums they received. But the banks nevertheless were estimated to have written off £600 million which was either unrecoverable or compromised as part of the litigation.

However, commentators have noted that the doctrine of ultra vires worked exactly as it was intended to. The law was designed to protect the ratepayers in local authorities from their representatives entering into reckless and foolish transactions. In that regard, it succeeded. Even if the consequences of the swaps litigation were stark, then they may still be compared favourably to situations such as the 1994 Orange County California bankruptcy (which arose from derivatives trading) in the United States, and the Italian local authorities derivatives contracts entered into between 2001 and 2008.

== Law of restitution ==
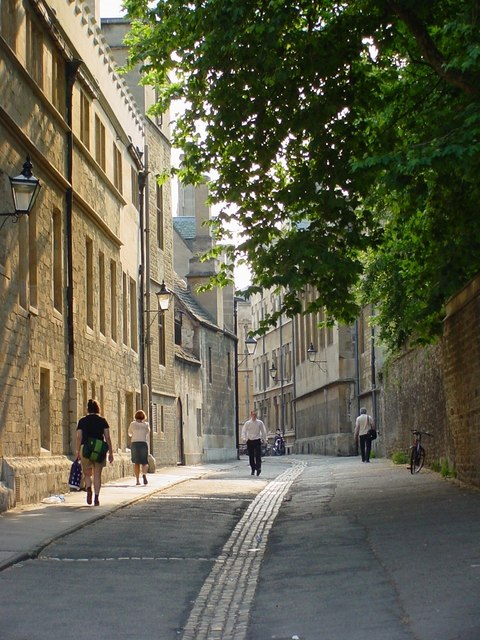
Prior to the swaps litigation, much of the attention to the law of restitution had come from academic lawyers, at Oxford (pictured) and Cambridge Universities in particular.

After the ruling in Hazel v Hammersmith and Fulham LBC the banks, local authorities and their advisers were confronted with the legal problem of how to unwind hundreds of swap contracts made on notional amounts of billions of pounds in aggregate. The problem was compounded by the fact that the law relating to recouping payments made under void contracts is called the law of restitution. And at this point in English legal history, the law of restitution was still a relatively niche subject. The House of Lords had only formally recognised the subject recently. Certain key academics, notably Professor Peter Birks at Oxford and Professor Gareth Jones at Cambridge, had been striving to bring greater awareness and rationalisation to this area of the law. But at the time the law of restitution was only taught on a handful of postgraduate courses, and few lawyers or judges had any practical experience of it (although this would change rapidly – in a decision of the House of Lords in 1998 Lord Goff would refer to counsel before the court as "seasoned warriors in the continuing battle of the swaps").

Facing this largely unexplored legal landscape, the lawyers advising the parties had several areas of legal uncertainty which they would have to confront:

1. Where a party sought to recover money which had been paid out under a contract which was void (as most of the banks had done in the swap transactions with local authorities), the normal mode of recovery was a legal form of action still known by the archaic name of "money had and received". The leading authority in this area was a House of Lords decision from 1914 called Sinclair v Brougham. Although the parties could not possibly know this at the time, Sinclair v Brougham would actually be overruled in one of the last decisions to be handed down as part of the swaps litigation.
2. Separately, in another decision, the House of Lords had recently recognised a new defence to a claim for restitution in English law, called "change of position". In summary, if a party acting in good faith had changed its position in reliance upon having received the money, then justice might dictate that it should not be forced to return that money. The local authorities, having spent the money received exercising their functions for the public good, would likely be able to make use of this defence. But its ambit and boundaries were still uncertain.
3. Apart from an action for money had and received, there was the possibility that the banks might try to claim that the money still belonged to them under a legal remedy known as tracing. At the time it was unclear if a right to trace could be founded upon a mistaken payment. Again, this would be resolved during the subsequent litigation, but at the outset the parties could not be certain of how the courts would rule.
4. Finally, in a related area of the law of restitution relating to mistake, it was generally accepted at the time that a party could recover money paid under a mistake of fact, but not a mistake of law (this was part of another ancient doctrine: nemo censetur ignorare legem, or "nobody is thought to be ignorant of the law"). There was some concern that the courts might hold that because the banks had made these payments labouring under a mistake of law (i.e. that the local authorities had the necessary legal capacity to enter into the swaps), those payments might by extension be unrecoverable. One of the cases in the swaps litigation would also reverse the previously held orthodox view.

== Key cases ==
Of all the cases which were launched subsequent to the decision in Hazel v Hammersmith, several were appealed to the Court of Appeal and three of which were appealed all the way to the House of Lords. Of all the cases possibly the most significant was Westdeutsche Landesbank Girozentrale v Islington LBC, which is now the leading judicial statement of the English law of resulting trusts. In 1995 Professor Andrew Burrows wrote "it is no exaggeration to say that one could write a book on the restitutionary consequences of the decision in Hazell." But in 1995 the swaps cases were still less than halfway through their course.

=== Westdeutsche Landesbank Girozentrale v Islington LBC ===
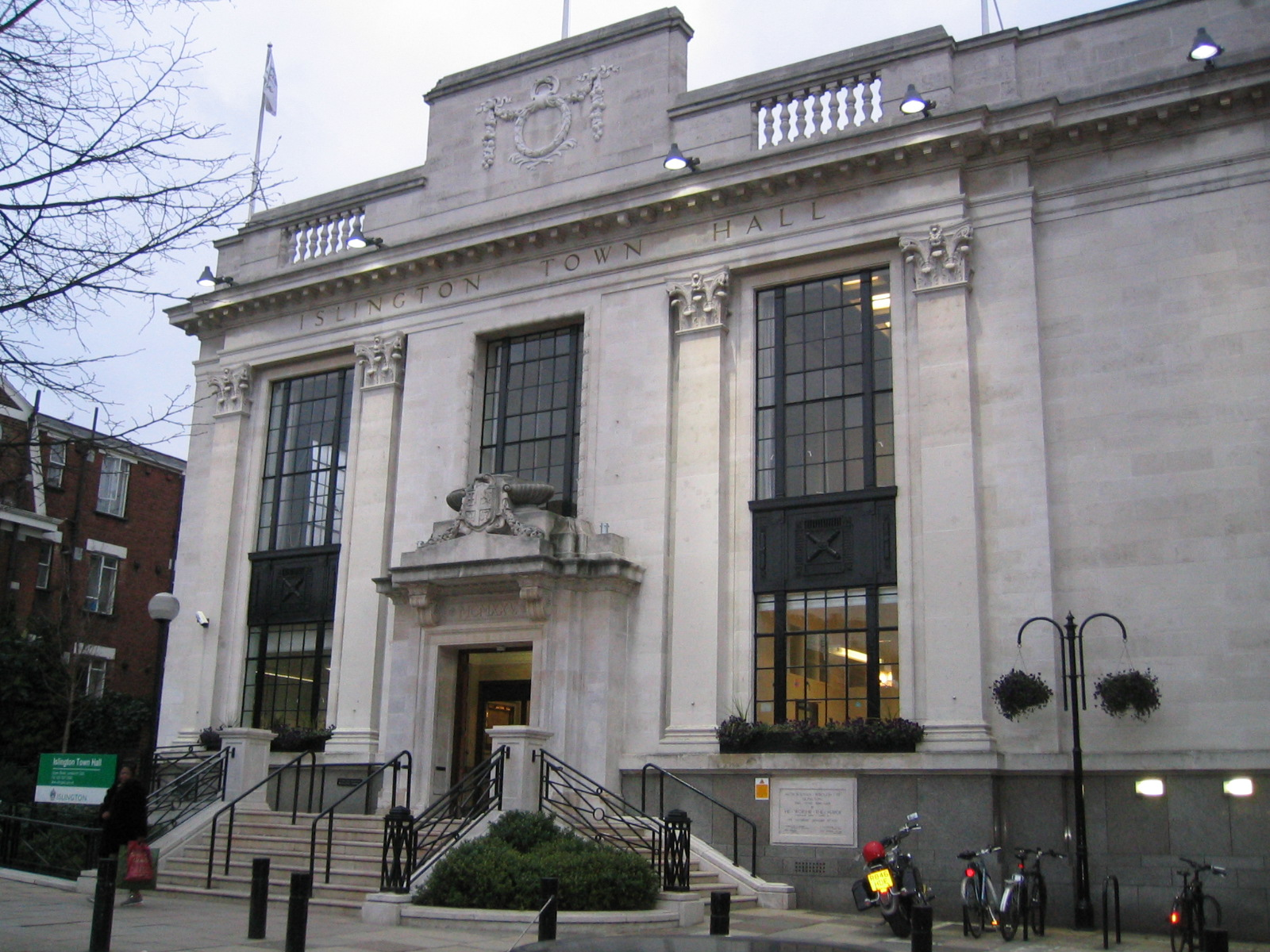
Islington Town Hall

The Westdeutsche case is probably the best known, and arguably the most important, of all the swaps cases. Ironically, the matters under dispute in the case give the appearance of being somewhat trivial. By this stage of the swaps litigation, there was general acceptance that the local authorities needed to repay the sums that they had received under the swap contracts with interest. Technically, in Westdeutsche the courts had to decide whether the interest was to be calculated as compound interest or simple interest. The reason that such a small matter relating to such small sums reached the highest court in the land is that answer to that question lay in the fundamental nature of resulting trusts in English law. If the banks only had a common law right to repayment of the money, they could only claim simple interest. But if they could trace the money in equity, then they could recover compound interest. In determining whether the right to equitable tracing arose when a party received money mistakenly and unaware of the mistake, the House of Lords exhaustively reviewed and considered the existing law, before finally determining (by a bare majority) that the bank had no proprietary interest in the money and was not entitled to claim compound interest. But the importance of the case is reflected in the legal rationale rather than the sums at stake or the actual outcome.

=== Kleinwort Benson v Glasgow CC (No 2) ===
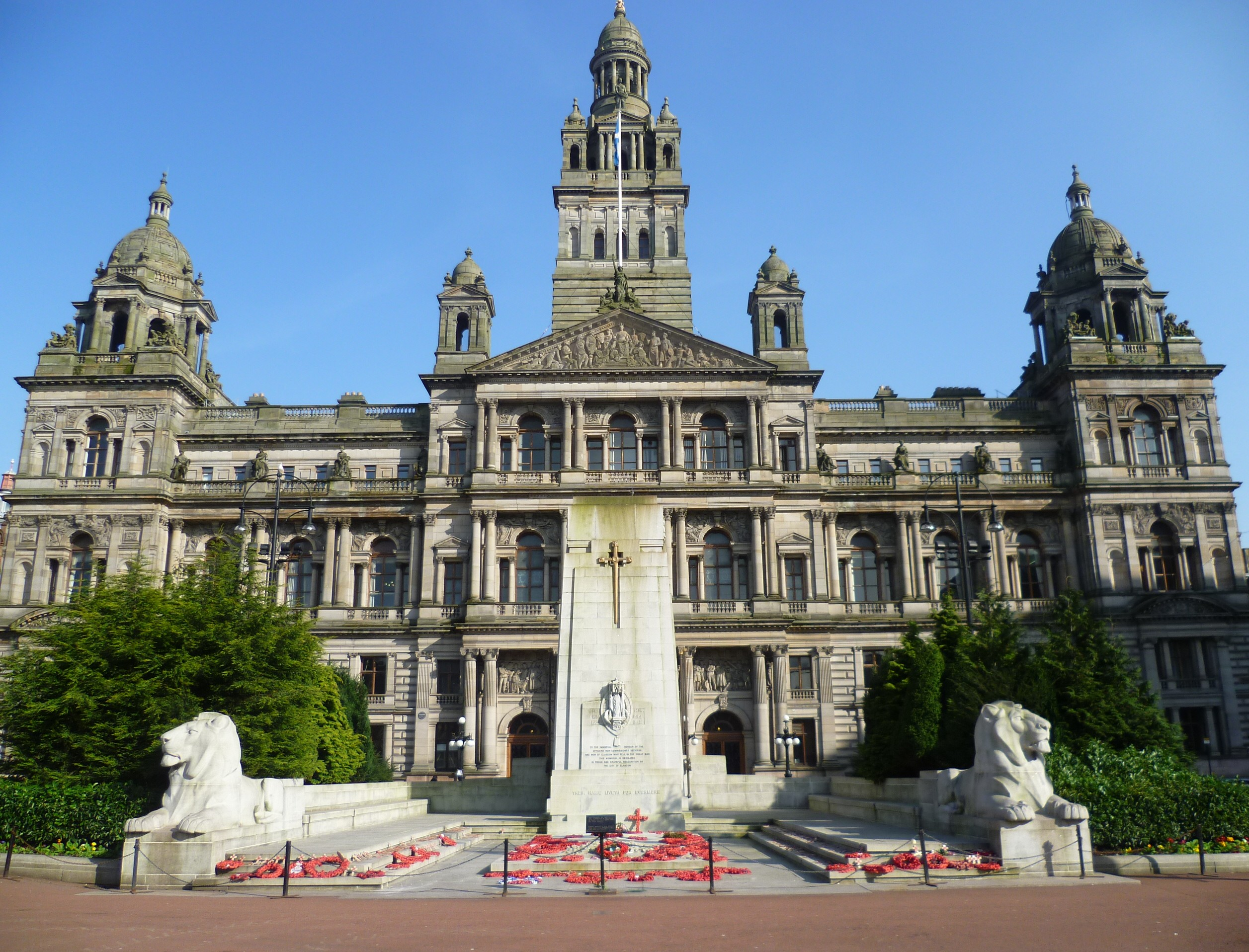
Glasgow City Chambers, the headquarters of Glasgow City Council.

The swaps entered into between Kleinwort Benson and Glasgow City Council led to two separate case reports, of which the second was the more significant, and was appealed all the way to the House of Lords. Glasgow City Council argued that the English courts had no jurisdiction over it, and the bank's claim should be brought in the Scottish courts (because of differences in the limitation periods under English law and Scottish law, Scotland was likely to be much more favourable to the local authority). Jurisdiction between the constituent parts of the United Kingdom is regulated by the Civil Jurisdiction and Judgments Act 1982, which effectively incorporates the provisions of the Brussels Convention on Jurisdiction and Judgments of 1968 into domestic jurisdictional issues as well as international ones. That Convention provides that the defendant should normally be sued in their domicile (i.e., in the case of Glasgow City Council, in Scotland) but it created exceptions for particular types of claim related to contract and tort. Accordingly, the courts had to decide whether claims for restitution or unjust enrichment could be treated as either contractual or tortious. The House of Lords held that they were neither, and accordingly, there being no relevant exception, the bank would need to bring its claims in Scotland.

=== Kleinwort Benson Ltd v Lincoln CC ===
The decision which is reported under the name Kleinwort Benson Ltd v Lincoln CC actually represents four co-joined appeals. It originally represented five (Kleinwort Benson Ltd v Glasgow CC was also included as a fifth co-joined appeal until it was stayed on jurisdictional grounds). The House of Lords unanimously held that the old rule that a mistake of law did not give rise to a right of recovery should no longer be applied. However, the five Law Lords then disagreed as to what the effect should be where the understanding of the law is changed by judicial pronouncement. When judges express an opinion on the common law, as noted by Lord Browne-Wilkinson, "The theoretical position has been that judges do not make or change law: they discover and declare the law which is throughout the same. According to this theory, when an earlier decision is overruled the law is not changed: its true nature is disclosed, having existed in that form all along." He then added: "This theoretical position is, as Lord Reid said, a fairy tale in which no-one any longer believes. In truth, judges make and change the law." Accordingly, in the view of Lord Browne-Wilkinson "although the decision in Hazell is retrospective in its effect, retrospection cannot falsify history: if at the date of each payment it was settled law that local authorities had capacity to enter into swap contracts, Kleinworts were not labouring under any mistake of law at that date. The subsequent decision in Hazell could not create a mistake where no mistake existed at the time."

However the majority, led Lord Goff disagreed. After a long and carefully reasoned judgment, Lord Goff summarised the position of the majority: "There is no principle of English law that payments made under a settled understanding of the law which is subsequently departed from by judicial decision shall not be recoverable in restitution on the ground of mistake of law. ... It is no defence to a claim in English law for restitution of money paid or property transferred under a mistake of law that the defendant honestly believed, when he learnt of the payment or transfer, that he was entitled to retain the money or property."

=== Kleinwort Benson Ltd v Birmingham CC ===
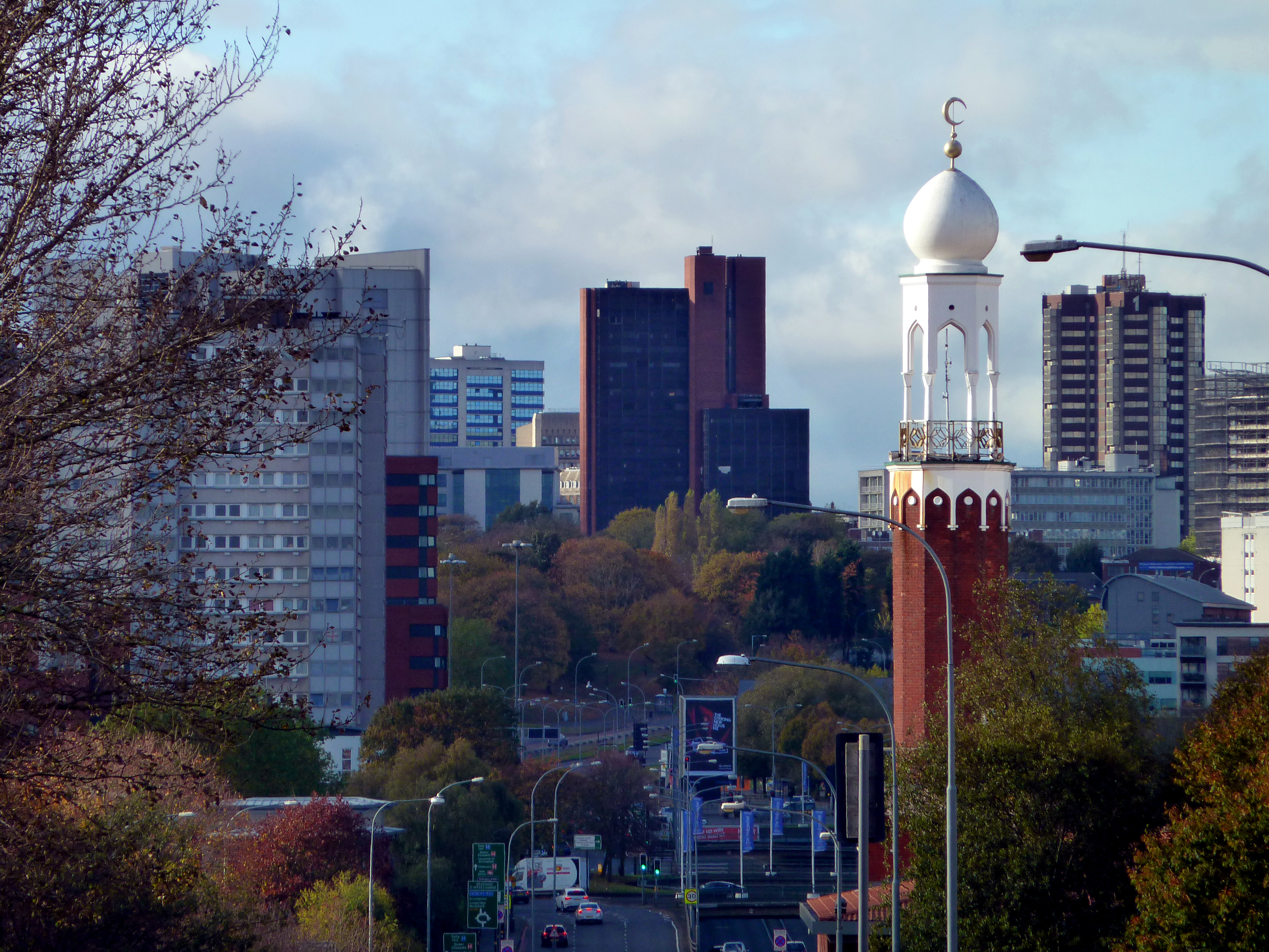
Birmingham.

In Kleinwort Benson Ltd v Birmingham CC the Court of Appeal was required to consider whether a defence of "passing on" existed under English law. Such a defence had been suggested by academics, and the counsel for the respondent local authority argued that because the bank had entered into back-to-back swaps, any loss arising under the swaps with the local authority had been passed on under other contractual arrangements. The Court of Appeal rejected that such a defence existed.

=== Kleinwort Benson v South Tyneside MBC ===
Kleinwort Benson v South Tyneside MBC was a first instance decision of Mr Justice Hobhouse (who would hear a number of the swaps cases). The court made a number of important holdings, mostly relating to the effect of limitation periods under English law. The court held that (1) for the purposes of limitation each contract had to be looked at separately, rather than simply looking at the bank's net claim; (2) payments by the local authority under the swaps did not amount to an "acknowledgement of indebtedness" for the purposes of the Limitation Act 1980; (3) the fact that banks had entered into back-to-back swaps was irrelevant in relation to liability under these swaps (the decision in Kleinwort Benson v South Tyneside MBC was handed down prior to the Court of Appeal decision in Kleinwort Benson Ltd v Birmingham CC); and (4) as the claim was at common law only simple interest could be recovered. An appeal against the decision was stayed pending the outcome of the decision in Westdeutsche.

=== Morgan Grenfell & Co Ltd v Welwyn Hatfield DC ===
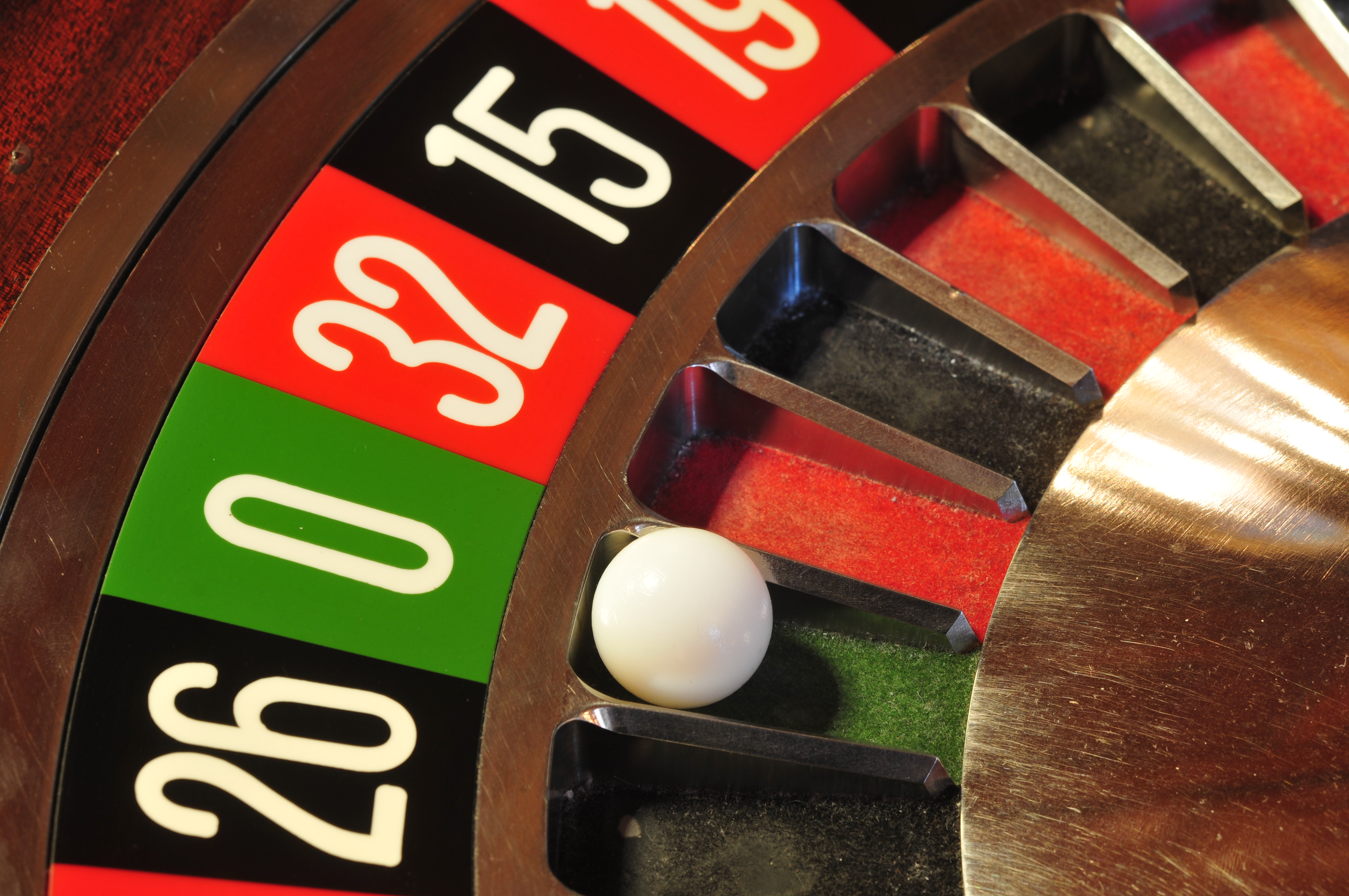
Mr Justice Hobhouse had to determine if swaps amounted to gambling in the eyes of the law.

The Welwyn Hatfield DC case was a test case to determine certain preliminary issues relating to the swaps.

1. Firstly, whether the swaps should be characterised as wagering contracts within section 18 of the Gaming Act 1845 or section 1 of the Gaming Act 1892.
2. Secondly, whether section 63 and paragraph 12 of schedule 1 to the Financial Services Act 1986 affected that conclusion.
3. Thirdly, whether any right to restitution arose if the contracts were held to be wagering contracts.

Mr Justice Hobhouse gave the judgment of the Court. He held that, whilst an interest rate swap contract had (at least potentially) a speculative character, where the interest rate swaps entered into by parties or institutions involved in the capital markets and/or the making and receiving of loans, the normal inference was that such contracts were not wagering or gaming. That inference would only be rebutted if the purpose and interest of both parties to the transaction was to wager, in which case the contracts would be legally invalid and unenforceable. He further held that in any event the transactions would have been validated by section 63 of the Financial Services Act 1986. Having made those findings, he declined to answer the third issue as irrelevant.

There was no appeal from his decision.

=== Baring Bros & Co v Cunninghame DC ===
Baring Bros & Co v Cunninghame DC was a decision of the Scottish Court of Session, which held that where a swaps contract was void ab initio, that also voided the governing law clause within the contract. Accordingly, the principles upon which restitution was to be repaid were not dictated by the putative governing law clause in the agreement but by the law with which the matter had its closest connection. Thus, the law to determine the quantum of the remedy would be determined by Scots law, as the law of the forum.

== Timeline ==
Timeline of the local authorities swaps litigation
Date	Event
December 1983	Hammersmith and Fulham LBC begins trading in the swaps market.
April 1987	Hammersmith and Fulham LBC significantly expands its derivatives trading. The finance department does not inform the executive.
June 1988	Banker from Goldman Sachs notifies district auditor of the size and scale of Hammersmith's swaps exposure.
August 1988	Hammersmith promises the district auditor that it will suspend entering into new swaps transactions "temporarily". It later partially rescinds the promise, saying it will enter into only "further selective trades" to prudently manage its exposure.
August 1988	It is revealed that Hammersmith's exposure in the swaps market is on notional principal sums of £4.2 billion (up from £138 million the previous year).
February 1989	Hammersmith seeks advice of its director of legal services on the swaps transactions for the first time.
February 1989	The cost of closing out all of Hammersmith's derivative contracts is estimated at around £300 million (or roughly £4,000 for every ratepayer in the borough).
April 1989	It emerges that Hammersmith has executed 613 swaps transactions since April 1987 (more than one per business day), involving a notional principal sum of £6.2 billion. This includes the period after Hammersmith had undertaken to "temporarily suspend" entering into swaps.
October 1989	First instance hearing in Hazell v Hammersmith and Fulham LBC. All local authority swap contracts held to be beyond the powers of local authorities and void.
February 1990	Court of Appeal overturns the decision in Hazell v Hammersmith and Fulham LBC, holding that speculative swaps are void, but swaps hedging an existing loan are lawful.
January 1991	House of Lords overturns the Court of Appeal's decision in Hazell v Hammersmith and Fulham LBC, restoring the original decision that all swaps entering into by local authorities are void.
May 1996	House of Lords issues decision in Westdeutsche Landesbank Girozentrale v Islington LBC
October 1997	House of Lords issues decision in Kleinwort Benson v Glasgow CC
