= Certificate of incorporation =

Legal document for corporations

A certificate of incorporation is a legal document/license relating to the formation of a company or corporation. It is a license to form a corporation issued by the state government or, in some jurisdictions, by a non-governmental entity/corporation. Its precise meaning depends upon the legal system in which it is used.

== United Arab Emirates ==
In the United Arab Emirates, the Certificate of Incorporation serves as the official legal document confirming a company’s registration and recognition as a separate legal entity. For mainland companies, it is issued by the relevant emirate’s Department of Economic Development, while companies in free zones obtain their certificates from their respective authorities, such as the Dubai Multi Commodities Centre, Jebel Ali Free Zone, or Abu Dhabi Global Market.

The document records fundamental company information, including its name, registration number, incorporation date, registered office, business structure, shareholders and directors, share capital, and approved business activities. Unlike trade licences in the UAE, which require renewal, the Certificate of Incorporation remains valid indefinitely, provided the company continues to comply with relevant regulations.

It is an essential document for establishing a corporate bank account, entering contracts, sponsoring visas, applying for trade licences, and participating in tenders, thereby forming a cornerstone of corporate operations in the UAE.

== Common law legal systems ==
In the U.S. a certificate of incorporation is usually used as an alternative description of a corporation's articles of incorporation. The certificate of incorporation, or articles of incorporation, form a major constituent part of the constitutional documents of the corporation. In English and Commonwealth legal systems, a certificate of incorporation is usually a simple certificate issued by the relevant government registry as confirmation of the due incorporation and valid existence of the company.

In other common law legal systems, the certificate of incorporation has less legal significance. However, it has been held by the House of Lords in Cotman v Brougham (1918), AC 514, that because the issue of the certificate of incorporation is conclusive evidence of the formation of a company, the issuance of the certificate overrides any irregularities which may have occurred during the formation of the company.

== Vietnam ==
In Vietnam, the Certificate of incorporation plays a crucial role. It not only serves as a confirmation of the legal existence of a business but also constitutes an indispensable part of the company's legal documentation. This certificate records fundamental information about the enterprise, including its name, registration number, address, business lines, charter capital, and other essential details.
