= John Hobhouse, Baron Hobhouse of Woodborough =

British barrister and judge

The Right Honourable The Lord Hobhouse of Woodborough PC

Lord of Appeal in Ordinary
- In office 1998–2004

Member of the House of Lords
- Lord Temporal
- Lord of Appeal in Ordinary; 1 October 1998 – 15 March 2004

Lord Justice of Appeal
- In office 1993–1998

Personal details
- Born: John Stewart Hobhouse; 31 January 1932 Mossley Hill, Liverpool
- Died: 15 March 2004 (aged 72)
- Spouse: Susannah Roskill
- Children: 3
- Education: Christ Church, Oxford
- Occupation: Judge
- Profession: Barrister

John Stewart Hobhouse, Baron Hobhouse of Woodborough, PC (31 January 1932 – 15 March 2004) was a British barrister and judge who served as a Lord of Appeal in Ordinary from 1998 to 2004.

== Biography ==
Hobhouse was born in Mossley Hill, Liverpool, the son of the shipowner Sir John Richard Hobhouse, and grandson of Henry Hobhouse, the MP. He was educated at Eton College. After working abroad in Australia and New Zealand on a sheep farm, Hobhouse returned to Christ Church, Oxford in 1951, where he read jurisprudence. He was called to the bar by Inner Temple in 1955, of which he later became a bencher.

Following a pupillage with Michael Kerr, Hobhouse became a tenant at 7 King's Bench Walk, the chambers of Henry Brandon, and joined the Northern Circuit. At the bar he specialised in admiralty law. He was appointed a Queen's Counsel in 1973.

Hobhouse was made a High Court judge in 1982, receiving the customary knighthood, and was assigned to the Queen's Bench Division. He was made a Lord Justice of Appeal in 1993, when he was also sworn of the Privy Council. On 1 October 1998 he was appointed as a Lord of Appeal in Ordinary, becoming a life peer as Baron Hobhouse of Woodborough, of Woodborough in the County of Wiltshire.

== Family ==
Lord Hobhouse was married to Susannah Roskill, the daughter of Sir Ashton Roskill QC. They had two sons and one daughter.

His grandfather Henry was the nephew and ward of Arthur Hobhouse, 1st Baron Hobhouse.

== Reputation ==
Lord Justice Bean has criticised Lord Hobhouse for his perceived lack of human empathy. He said, "Hobhouse was a desiccated calculating machine, unsuited to trying cases involving human beings."

== Notable cases ==
Notable judicial decisions in which Lord Hobhouse participated included:

- Hazell v Hammersmith and Fulham LBC (at first instance)
- Morgan Grenfell & Co Ltd v Welwyn Hatfield DC (Divisional Court - key test case in the local authorities swaps litigation)
- Westdeutsche Landesbank Girozentrale v Islington LBC (at first instance)
- R (Factortame Ltd) v Secretary of State for Transport ("Factortame IV", Divisional Court)
- Berezovsky v Michaels (House of Lords)
- Attorney General v Blake (House of Lords)
- R v Hinks (House of Lords)
- Lange v Atkinson (Privy Council)
- Auckland Harbour Board v Commissioner of Inland Revenue (Privy Council)
- Royal Bank of Scotland plc v Etridge (No 2) (House of Lords)
- Dextra Bank & Trust Co Ltd v Bank of Jamaica (Privy Council)
- Mirvahedy v Henley (House of Lords)
- B v Attorney General (Privy Council)
- Tomlinson v Congleton BC (House of Lords)
- Shogun Finance Ltd v Hudson (House of Lords)
- R v Bow Street Stipendiary Magistrate, ex parte United States Government (House of Lords)
