= Objects clause =

An objects clause is a provision in a company's constitution stating the purpose and range of activities for which the company is carried on. In UK company law, until reforms enacted in the Companies Act 1989 and the Companies Act 2006, an objects clause circumscribed the capacity, or power, of a company to act. To avoid problems, long and unwieldy 'catch-all' objects clauses were often drafted to include as much potential activity as possible, and thus avoid dealings being found to be ultra vires: the legal position was that any contract entered into beyond the power, or ultra vires, would be deemed void ab initio.

The legal problems concerning objects clauses are now largely historical artifacts. Newly registered companies no longer have to register objects under the Companies Act 2006 section 31, and that even if they do, the ultra vires doctrine has been abolished against third parties under section 39. A clause is only relevant in an action against a director for breach of duty under section 171 for failure to observe the limits of their constitutional power.

== Historical development ==
Objects clauses were first seen in chartered corporations. Before the Industrial Revolution and the lifting on restrictions for private individuals to start companies, corporations were granted concessions from the state to operate a trade. The concession theory held that the state gave all power to companies. If companies acted outside the power granted, such actions were necessarily contrary to the public interest, null and void. The fact that people contracting with a corporation may be thoroughly disappointed and suffer loss was legitimated on the basis that every member of the public could see the law defining the corporation's capacity. Ignorantia juris non excusat.

=== Relevant cases ===
- Ashbury Railway Carriage & Iron Co Ltd v Riche (1875) LR 7 HL 653
- Attorney General v Great Eastern Railway Co (1880) 5 App Cas 473, companies have the power to do things reasonably incidental to their objects. Care must be taken to distinguish cases where directors abused their authority, but had not acted beyond the company's capacity.
- Bell Houses v City Wall Properties [1966] 2 QB 656, objects clauses can give directors full discretion
- Re Introductions Ltd [1970] Ch 199, pig breeding was not within the company's objects. A money lender knew that the purpose of the loan was for pig breeding. Held, it was unable to enforce the loan. Furthermore, though there was an object for the company to borrow money, this object was construed as not being a substantive and separate object.
- Rolled Steel Products (Holdings) Ltd v British Steel Corp [1985] Ch 246, criticised Re Introductions Ltd for not holding that the directors had not merely abused their power.
- Hutton v West Cork Railway Co (1883) 23 Ch D 654, gifts must be ‘for the benefit of the company’
- Evans v Brunner, Mond & Co Ltd [1921] 1 Ch 359
- Re Lee Behrens [1932] 2 Ch 46 (S&W 148) confusion of ‘implied powers’ and ‘directors’ duties’
- Re Horsley v Weight [1982] 3 All ER 1045
- Charterbridge Corp Ltd v Lloyds Bank Ltd [1970] Ch 62

== Background to reform ==
The Cohen Committee (Cmnd 6659, 1945) para 12 recommended every company ‘should, notwithstanding anything omitted from its memorandum of association, have as regards third parties the same powers as an individual. Existing provisions in memoranda as regards the powers of companies… should operate solely as a contract between a company and its shareholders as to the powers exercisable by the directors’. This was not abandoned because it was thought reform of the constructive notice rule was too essential, and needed more research (if you constructively knew an object you would be bound).

Then the Jenkins Committee (Cmnd 1749, 1962) para 42 would have replaced constructive notice with various statutory rules but not abolished the ultra vires doctrine itself.

When the European Communities Act 1972 was put in place, section 9, based on Directive 77/91/EEC (requiring a company to state objects, but not to have them) lead to mandatory protections for people transacting with companies. As a result, the Companies Act 1985 was amended to include sections 35 and 35A-B.

The Prentice Report (1986) led to the Companies Act 1989. This recommended abolishing constructive notice and that actions of a company could not be called into question for lack of capacity, but still no ultra vires abolition.

== Present legislation ==
Under the Companies Act 2006, companies need not register any objects according to section 31.

31 Statement of company’s objects

(1) Unless a company’s articles specifically restrict the objects of the company, its objects are unrestricted.
(2) Where a company amends its articles so as to add, remove or alter a statement of the company’s objects—

(a) it must give notice to the registrar,
(b) on receipt of the notice, the registrar shall register it, and
(c) the amendment is not effective until entry of that notice on the register.

(3) Any such amendment does not affect any rights or obligations of the company or render defective any legal proceedings by or against it.

If companies do register objects, it is irrelevant for the validity of contracts with outside parties.

39 A company’s capacity

(1) The validity of an act done by a company shall not be called into question on the ground of lack of capacity by reason of anything in the company’s constitution...

Charitable companies, however, under sections 39(2) and 42 are still subject to the common law, meaning that they may be afforded some greater protection.

The abolition of the ultra vires doctrine, however, does not affect the operation of the ordinary principles of the law of agency. A third party may still find that a contract is voidable (though not void, meaning that equitable bars to rescission of agreements operate) if it was clear that the person they dealt with was conducting themselves beyond the scope of their authority.

== Relevance for directors' duties ==
The ultra vires doctrine, based on a company's objects, remains fully functional for internal purposes. Under the Companies Act 2006 section 171 directors must observe the constitutional limits on their powers, and are liable to pay compensation if they fail. A member can seek an injunction to restrain an ultra vires act. Directors who overstep an objects clause may be disqualified for doing so (see Re Samuel Sherman plc).

== See also ==
- UK company law
- Capacity in English law
