= Control of Horses Act 2015 =

Act of the Parliament of the United Kingdom

Control of Horses Act 2015 (Note: Section 5(3).)
- Act of Parliament
- Parliament of the United Kingdom
- Long title: An Act to make provision for the taking of action in relation to horses which are on land in England without lawful authority; and for connected purposes.
- Citation: 2015 c. 23
- Introduced by: Julian Sturdy (Commons); Baroness Mallalieu (Lords)
- Territorial extent: England and Wales (Note: Section 5(2).)

Dates
- Royal assent: 26 March 2015
- Commencement: 26 May 2015 (Note: Section 5(1).)
Other legislation
Amends	Animals Act 1971

Status: Current legislation

History of passage through Parliament

Text of statute as originally enacted

Revised text of statute as amended

The Control of Horses Act 2015 (c. 23) is an act of the Parliament of the united Kingdom which amends the Animals Act 1971 to give landowners and local authorities of England the power to detain horses under certain circumstances. It was introduced as a ballot bill by Conservative MP Julian Sturdy and was supported by the Government.

== Background ==
Under the Animals Act 1971, horses that had been detained had to be disposed of in fourteen days. They also had to be sold at a market or an auction, despite many having little or no value.

There are already laws on the statute book to require all horses to be identified by a horse passport and a microchip it has become a significant problem in some parts of England and there were calls for the law to be changed to make it easier for local authorities in relation to public places and freeholders and occupiers of land to deal with the problem.

== Provisions ==
A local authority in England may detain a horse which is in any public place in its area if the local authority has reasonable grounds for believing that the horse is there without lawful authority, and if the land is lawfully occupied by a person that person consents to the detention of the horse or the local authority has reasonable grounds for believing that that person would consent to the detention of the horse.

A local authority is defined as a county council, district council, London borough council, the Common Council of the City of London, or the Council of the Isles of Scilly.

A public place is defined as any common land or town or village green or any highway (and the verges of any highway).

A landowner may also exercise these powers.

== Territorial extent ==
This act extends to England and Wales, but only applies to local authorities and landowners in England. There is a similar piece of devolved legislation, the Control of Horses (Wales) Act 2014, which has similar provisions.
