= Christopher French (judge) =

British barrister and judge

Sir Christopher French
- Born: Christopher James Saunders French; 14 October 1925; Hendon, London, England
- Died: 25 March 2003 (aged 77); Oxford, Oxfordshire, England
- Occupations: Barrister and Judge
- Known for: High Court Judge

Sir Christopher James Saunders French (14 October 1925 – 25 March 2003) was a British barrister and judge who sat on the High Court of Justice. He is most commonly remembered as the judge who sat on the Sellafield cancer litigation, described as "one of the longest, most complicated and most expensive civil actions ever heard before a British court."

== Early life ==
French was born in 1925, the son of Reverend Reginald French, who had won a Military Cross in World War I for rescuing wounded soldiers under enemy fire, and was later named honorary chaplain to the Queen.

He won an academic scholarship first to Denstone College, and then later to Brasenose College, Oxford, where he read law. His university studies were interrupted by the Second World War, where he service in the Coldstream Guards as a sapper. He was discharged in 1948 with the rank of captain, and returned to Oxford to finish his legal studies. Whilst at Oxford he rowed bow for the Brasenose eight.

French was called to the Bar in 1950 as a member of the Inner Temple, and he became a tenant at 1 Crown Office Row. He built a general common law practice in London and on the Midland Circuit. He became a Queen's Counsel in 1966 and acting as leading counsel in the Thalidomide litigation. Whilst still at the bar he served as deputy chairman of Buckinghamshire Quarter Sessions from 1966 to 1971 and as Recorder of Coventry from 1972 to 1979.

== Judicial career ==
French was appointed as a High Court judge in 1979, and was initially assigned to the Family Division. However he would switch to the Queen's Bench Division three years later. In one of his obituaries, he was described as "being invariably calm, decent, unflustered and not liable to be provoked." Not all commentary on French as a judge was quite so flattering. In his book, Privacy and the Press, Joshua Rozenberg noted acidly that as French was dead he was now free to write openly about his conduct of the libel claim brought by Albert Reynolds against the Sunday Times, but then restrained himself to saying "all I shall say is that there needs to be a better way of ensuring that judges whose powers are in decline through age or illness do not carry on sitting," and noting that in the Court of Appeal Lord Justice Bingham saw the force in the criticisms made of French's conduct of the trial.

Apart from the Sellafield litigation he presided over a number of high-profile libel trials. In 1986 he awarded the London Symphony Orchestra substantial damages over allegations made in Private Eye that its members were "drunk, dissolute, unruly and irresponsible". Other defamation cases that he presided over included those between Alan Sugar and Terry Venables, Imran Khan and Ian Botham, Graeme Souness and the Mail on Sunday, and Albert Reynolds and the Sunday Times.

Hon Mr Justice French also sat as the judge at first instance in Hazell v Hammersmith and Fulham LBC [1990] 2 QB 697. Although his decision was overturned by the Court of Appeal, it would subsequently be restored by the House of Lords.

== Family ==
He married once, in 1957, Philippa Price, and she predeceased him in 2001. They had a son and a daughter.
