= Anthony Scrivener =

Anthony Frank Scrivener QC (31 July 1935 – 27 March 2015) was a British barrister. His high profile clients led him to becoming one of the highest paid barristers in the UK, commanding the first £1 million brief. He spent a period as chair of the Bar Council, where he pushed for reform.

== Biography ==
Frank Bertram Scrivener was born in Canterbury, Kent on 31 July 1935. His father, Frank Bertram Scrivener was a shopkeeper and ironmonger; his mother was Edna Isabella Agnes (née Mather). Known to his friends as 'Scriv', young Frank Jr. added "Anthony" to his forename.

He was educated at Kent College, and University College London, where he read law and graduated in 1957, then being called to the bar at Gray's Inn in 1958. He lectured in law in Ghana for two years, returned to the UK and became a QC in 1975. He was elected chairman of the Bar Council in 1990 and used the appointment to push through reforming measures.

Scrivener's clients included notable individuals such as Sir Richard Branson, Gerry Conlon (of the Guildford Four), Jack Lyons (of the Guinness Four), Lee Clegg, Ken Livingstone, Joseph Lyons Asil Nadir, Tony Martin, Peter Godber, Dame Shirley Porter, and Winston Silcott. Scrivener was one of the highest earning members of the bar, including the first £1 million brief for one of the members of the Carrian Group fraud trial. Despite this, he was a strong supporter of legal aid, and included pro bono work in his practice. He was consulted by a number of local authorities over financial transactions; his advice was later found to be incorrect, leading to the local authorities swaps litigation.

In 1989, Scrivener became the vice-chairman of the Bar Council, and became chair in 1990. There he instigated a number of reforms to the law of England and Wales, as well as pushing for reforms further to open up the bar to ethnic minorities and women.

Scrivener married three times; to Sheila Mary Arnott (1958), to Irén Becze (1964) and to Ying Hui Tan, a barrister (1993). Scrivener died on 27 March 2015, at Rendlesham Care Centre, Rendlesham, Suffolk, aged 79 from complications caused by Parkinson's disease.
