= Ashbury Rly Carriage and Iron Co Ltd v Riche =

UK legal case

Ashbury Railway Carriage and Iron Co. Ltd v Riche
- Court: House of Lords
- Citation: (1875) LR 7 HL 653

Case history
- Prior action: (1875) LR 9 Ex 224

Keywords
- companies, objects clause, corporate capacity, ultra vires

Ashbury Railway Carriage and Iron Co Ltd v Riche (1875) LR 7 HL 653 is a UK company law case, which concerned the objects clause of a company's memorandum of association.

Its importance as case law has been diminished as a result of the Companies Act 2006 s 31, which allows for unlimited objects for which a company may be carried on. Furthermore, any limits a company does have in its objects clause have no effect whatsoever for people outside a company (s 39 CA 2006), except as a general issue of authority of the company's agents.

== Facts ==
Incorporated under the Companies Act 1862, the Ashbury Railway Carriage and Iron Company Ltd’s memorandum, clause 3, stated that its objects were "to make and sell, or lend on hire, railway-carriages…" and clause 4 stated that activities beyond this needed a special resolution. But the company agreed to give Riche and his brother a loan to build a railway from Antwerp to Tournai in Belgium. Later, the company repudiated the agreement. Riche sued, and the company pleaded that the action was ultra vires.

== Judgment ==
=== Exchequer Court ===
The judges of the exchequer chamber being equally divided, the decision of the court below was affirmed.

Blackburn J said:

If I thought it was at common law an incident to a corporation that its capacity should be limited by the instrument creating it, I should agree that the capacity of a company incorporated under the act of 1862 was limited to the object in the memorandum of association. But if I am right in the opinion which I have already expressed, that the general power of contracting is an incident to a corporation which it requires an indication of intention in the legislature to take away, I see no such indication here. If the question was whether the legislature had conferred on a corporation, created under this act, capacity to enter into contracts beyond the provisions of the deed, there could be only one answer. The legislature did not confer such capacity. But if the question be, as I apprehend it is, whether the legislature have indicated an intention to take away the power of contracting which at common law would be incident to a body corporate, and not merely to limit the authority of the managing body and the majority of the shareholders to bind the minority, but also to prohibit and make illegal contracts made by the body corporate, in such a manner that they would be binding on the body if incorporated at common law, I think the answer should be the other way.

=== House of Lords ===
The House of Lords, agreeing with the three dissentient judges in the Exchequer Chamber, pronounced the effect of the Companies Act to be the opposite of that indicated by Mr Justice Blackburn. It held that if a company pursues objects beyond the scope of the memorandum of association, the company's actions are ultra vires and void. Lord Cairns LC said,

It was the intention of the legislature, not implied, but actually expressed, that the corporations, should not enter, having regard to this memorandum of association, into a contract of this description. The contract in my judgment could not have been ratified by the unanimous assent of the whole corporation.
