= Haugesund Kommune v DEPFA ACS Bank =

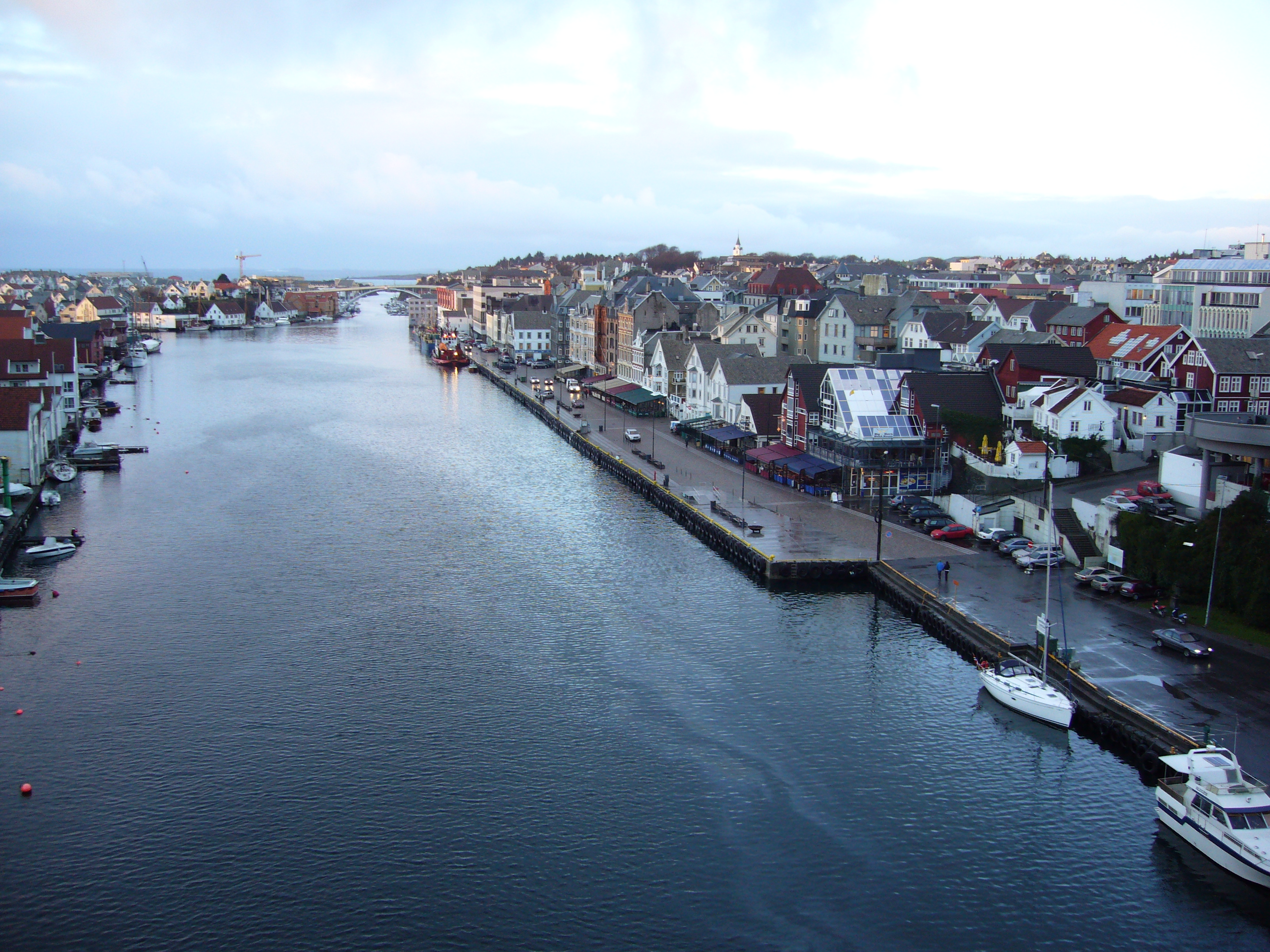
- Court: Court of Appeal
- Full case name: (1) Haugesund Kommune and (2) Narvik Kommune v (1) DEPFA ACS Bank and (2) Wikborg Rein & Co
- Decided: 27 May 2010
- Citations: [2010] EWCA Civ 579 [2012] 2 WLR 199 [2012] QB 549 [2011] 1 All ER (Comm) 985

Case history
- Prior action: [2009] EWHC 2227 (Comm)
- Subsequent action: [2011] EWCA Civ 33

Court membership
- Judges sitting: Aikens LJ; Pill LJ; Etherton LJ

Haugesund Kommune v DEPFA ACS Bank [2010] EWCA Civ 579 and the subsequent decision in Haugesund Kommune v DEPFA ACS Bank (No 2) [2011] EWCA Civ 33 were decisions of the English Court of Appeal relating to the consequences of certain swap transactions which had been entered into between the Irish bank and the Norwegian kommune, but were held to be beyond the powers of ("ultra vires") the kommune.

In his judgment Lord Justice Aikens noted the striking similarity between the case before him, and the long series of decisions in the local authorities swaps litigation relating to similar transactions entered into by English local authorities. Nonetheless, the appeals raised a number of novel points of English law relating to restitution.

== Background ==
DEPFA Bank was an Irish bank. Haugesund Kommune and Narvik Kommune were local municipalities in Norway. The Kommunes had entered into interest rate swap transactions with the banks. Although the transactions were documented as swaps, the rate payable by the bank under the swaps was zero (and they were called "zero coupon swaps") and initial payments by the bank were repaid in small quarterly amortisation payments with a single bullet repayment at the end. Commercially the effect was similar to a term loan with a backloaded repayment schedule than a true interest rate swap. The Kommunes then invested those payments in a number of financial investments. The investments went disastrously wrong, and the whole episode was described by the Court of Appeal as having been "regarded as somewhat of a scandal in Norway".

After things had gone wrong, the Kommunes challenged the validity of the transactions, alleging that under Norwegian law the Kommunes did not have legal capacity to enter into such transactions. Under the ISDA Master Agreements that documented the transactions, the contracts were governed by English law and were subject to an English jurisdiction clause.

The bank counterclaimed for repayment of the sums, and joined Wikborg Rein & Co (a Norwegian law firm) as a Part 20 defendant on the counterclaim. The law firm had advised the bank that the Kommunes were able to enter into the transactions, and so on their counterclaim the bank asserted that if transactions were invalid, then Wikborg Rein & Co should be liable to the bank for professional negligence.

The matter came before Tomlinson J at first instance. He ruled that the swaps were beyond the powers of the Kommunes, and therefore the transactions were void. However, he also ruled that the Kommunes had to repay the money which had been advanced to them as money had and received on the basis of a failure of consideration. He also held that Wikborg Rein & Co had been negligent, with damages to be assessed on a later date.

== Haugesund Kommune v DEPFA ACS Bank (No 1) ==
The matter was appealed to the Court of Appeal, where Lord Justice Aiken gave the main judgment. He held that there were three issues which arose for consideration on the appeal (although the last issue had two limbs):

1. Whether the judge was correct to conclude that the Kommunes had no capacity to enter into the transactions;
2. If the transactions are void, what is the scope of the restitutionary remedy available to the bank;
3. Could the Kommunes rely upon a defence of "change of position", in respect of which the Kommunes argued:
  1. the judge misapplied the relevant law; and
  2. the judge had misunderstood or misapplied the relevant aspect of public policy for protection of the public under Norwegian law.

=== Issue #1 - Capacity ===
The Court of Appeal agreed with the trial judge that under the Rome Convention, which was given the force of law in the United Kingdom by the Contracts (Applicable Law) Act 1990, the capacity of parties was excluded from the Convention regime. Accordingly such issues are therefore governed by English common law conflict of laws rules. Dicey Morris & Collins indicated, at Rule 162 that: "(1) The capacity of a corporation to enter into any legal transaction is governed both by the constitution of the corporation and by the law of the country which governs the transaction in question. (2) All matters concerning the constitution of a corporation are governed by the law of the place of incorporation". The Kommunes argued that under Norwegian law they lacked capacity to enter into the transactions. The Court of Appeal extensively reviewed the expert evidence of Norwegian law given at trial.

The Court approved statements in Macmillan Inc v Bishopsgate Investment Trust plc (No 3) [1996] WLR 387 that "...to strive for comity between competing legal systems, [classification] should not be constrained by particular notions or distinctions of the domestic law of the lex fori, or that of the competing system of law, which may have no counterpart in the other's system. Nor should the issue be defined too narrowly so that it attracts a particular domestic rule under the lex fori which may not be applicable under the other system..." In other words, the Court would take a broad view as to whether the Kommune's had the necessary capacity, rather than getting tied up in the detail of English legal distinctions between capacity and powers. Under section 50 of the Norwegian Local Government Act 1992 local authorities were restricted in their ability to borrow loans; the Court was satisfied that under Norwegian law the swaps would have been treated as loans, and that the Kommunes lacked substantive power to enter into those transactions. Accordingly the transactions were void.

=== Issue #2 - Restitutionary remedy ===
Under English conflict of laws rules, even though the capacity of the Kommune to enter into the transactions was governed by Norwegian law, the consequences of the contracts being held to be void still fell to be determined by English law as the putative proper law of the contracts. The Court of Appeal then embarked upon an exhaustive analysis of the authorities, and in particular to the two House of Lords' decisions in Sinclair v Brougham [1914] AC 398 and Westdeutsche Landesbank Girozentrale v Islington LBC [1996] UKHL 12, but also the decision of the Privy Council in Goss v Chilcott [1996] UKPC 17.

After considering all the authorities the Court was satisfied that the bank could enforce a valid claim for money had and received under the law of restitution, and could claim the return of the sums advanced under the void contract (plus interest) on the basis of failure of consideration.

=== Issue #3 - Change of position ===
The Court separated the question of whether the Kommune's had the benefit of a change of position defence into two parts. The appeal was made on the basis of a single defence, but the Court held: "I think this is the wrong analysis. In my view the English cases show that these are two distinct defences to a restitutionary claim." The Court then dealt with those separately.

==== "Public policy" argument ====
The Court held that there "is no doubt that in English law a restitutionary claim for the return of money may be defeated on grounds of public policy where, on the correct construction of a statute or regulation, recovery in restitution would be contrary to the objective of the statute", and cited various authorities in support. What was not clear was the extent to which a foreign public policy could be utilised in the same way. The judge at first instance had found as a fact that "one of the purposes of section 50 is to protect the citizens from the consequences of the municipality borrowing for other than a permitted purpose". The Court held that in principle a foreign public policy could provide a basis for refusing to permit a restitutionary claim, but on the facts of this case it did not do so.

==== "Change of position" argument ====
The Kommunes argued that because they had received the sums from the bank, invested those sums, and lost money on the investments, it would be inequitable to ask them to repay money which they no longer have. Conversely the bank argued that the Kommune's took the decision, and the risk, of investing the loaned monies. Accordingly, the bank should not be penalised for the Kommune's subsequent decisions. The Court of Appeal approach the issue in three stages: First, what are the general principles of the defence of "change of position" in the law of restitution? Secondly, how are those applicable to the facts of this case? Thirdly, has Tomlinson J erred in his analysis or conclusions on this issue?

After reviewing the extensive case law, Aiken LJ summarised it thus:

First, the defence of change of position is a general defence to all restitution claims (for money or other property) based on unjust enrichment. Secondly, the question is always whether it is unjust to allow the claimant to have restitution in whole or in part. Thirdly, that itself depends on whether the defendant has so changed his position that the injustice of requiring him to repay outweighs the injustice of denying the claimant restitution (in whole or part). That can only be decided on the facts of each individual case. Fourthly, a defendant cannot rely on this defence if he has acted in bad faith or has failed to show good faith, which is not the same thing as having acted dishonestly.

Balancing those considerations on the fact, he felt that "[t]he scales fall heavily in favour of Depfa recovering the full amount that it paid over to the Kommunes." In that respect he felt that the judge had correctly applied the principles to the facts at trial.

== Haugesund Kommune v DEPFA ACS Bank (No 2) ==
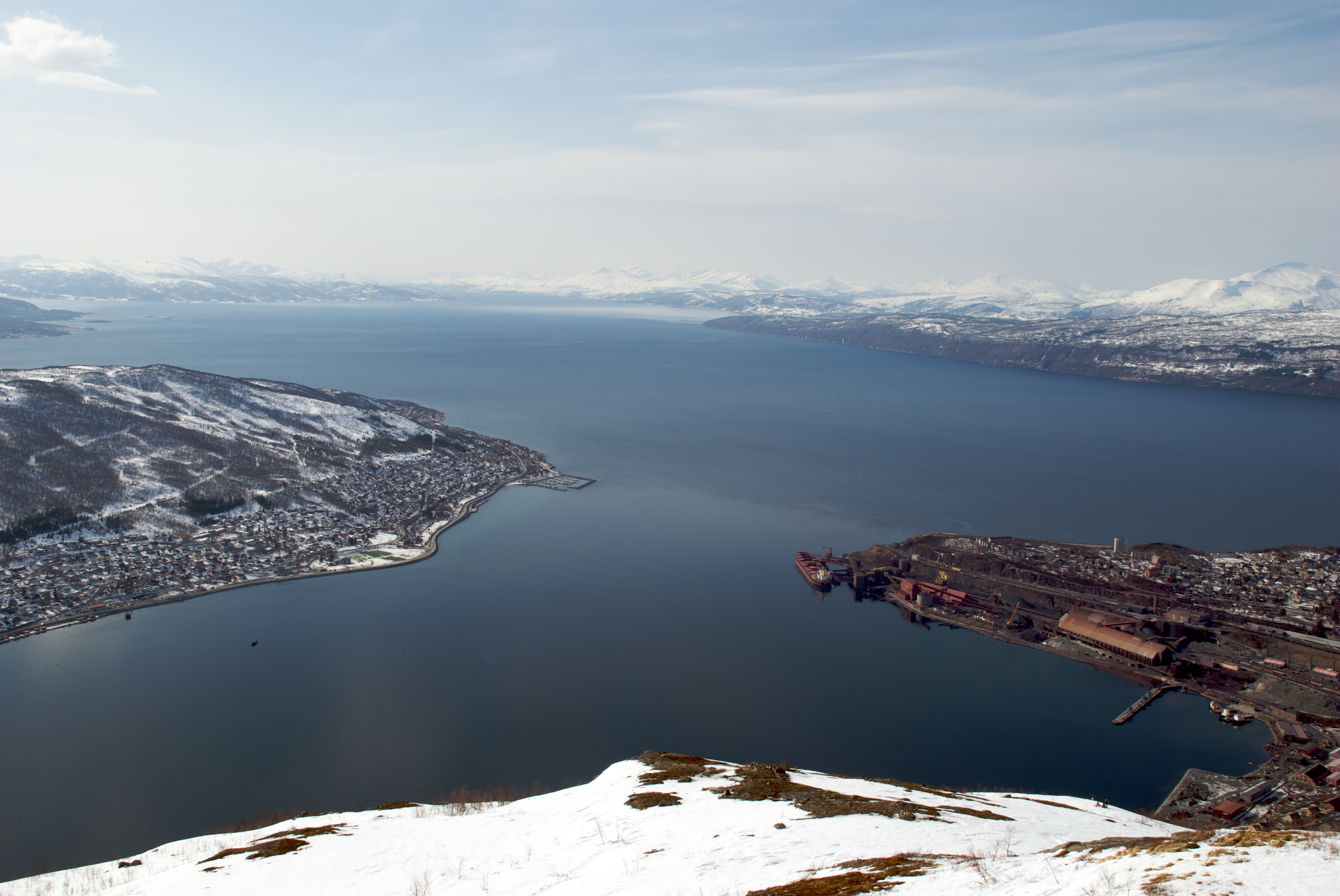
Narvik Kommune.

After the first judgment of the Court of Appeal handed down, the Kommunes withdrew from the proceedings, and refused to pay the sums ordered by the court. Accordingly, the bank then sought to pursue it claims against the Part 20 defendants, Wikborg Rein. That was also made subject to an appeal to the Court of Appeal, which for the second appeal was constituted by Rix LJ, Gross LJ and Peter Smith J.

The issue was summed up by Lord Justice Rix:

A solicitor wrongly and negligently advises a bank that its prospective counterparty to a banking transaction has capacity to enter into the proposed transaction, which is in fact ultra vires and void. The counterparty is nevertheless liable to repay the bank in restitution. Is the solicitor liable to the bank for the whole of the sum transferred to the counterparty irrespective of every other consideration, save only to the extent that the bank succeeds in making an actual recovery from its counterparty? That is the essential question asked on this appeal.

Rix LJ also gave the lead judgment. He described Wikborg Rein as "a well-known and highly respected firm of lawyers", and noted. and indicated that they had "advised in unqualified terms that the swap contracts were not loans for the purposes of [relevant provisions of Norwegian law] and that the Kommunes had full capacity to enter into them." That advice had turned out to be incorrect. He further noted that "[i]t was common ground that Depfa knew, and was willing to take the risk, that it was not possible to obtain execution against the Kommunes, should there be any need to do so. Wikborg Rein had advised Depfa that – 'A claim against a Norwegian municipality cannot be enforced, no distress or seizure may be obtained of any of its assets and no bankruptcy or debt settlement proceedings may be initiated against it.'" The law firm largely defended the claim against it on two ground: first, that Depfa had suffered no loss (because it had a valid claim against the Kommunes as recognised by an English judgment); and secondly, that any loss suffered was outside, or was not on the evidence shown to be within, the scope of Wikborg Rein's duty.

Rix LJ considered the decision a fairly binary one in legal terms. Either the law firm was liable for all losses which flowed from their advice (as the bank argued), or the scope of their duty was specifically limited and the loss fell outside of the scope of what they were being asked to advise upon (as the law firm argued). Ultimately he preferred the latter view. He noted that the bank had willingly undertaken sole credit risk on the transaction if the Kommunes did not perform their obligations, holding: "I conclude that Wikborg Rein is not responsible for any loss with respect to its advances which Depfa may ultimately suffer by reason of the Kommunes' impecuniosity or unwillingness to abide by the decision of the English court which they have invoked. Even if, contrary to the view I have expressed above, Depfa did suffer a complete loss of its advances at the time of their transfer to the Kommunes, that loss was not within the scope of Wikborg Rein's duty."

In a separate judgment, Gross LJ agreed with Rix LJ as to the outcome, but differed as to the reasoning. Like Rix LJ he accepted the principle laid down in The Liverpool (No. 2) [1963] P 64 as correct and not in doubt; a claimant with remedies against more than one defendant must be free to choose which defendant to pursue, without the need to give credit for his claim against the other. However, he felt unable to accept that Wikborg Rein could be liable for loss relating to enforcement and credit risks given that their advice had been to the effect that the Kommunes could not be forced to pay. "Even if the contract was valid, Depfa had been advised that it could not enforce a claim against the Kommunes. So far as concerns the credit risk, that was for the bank (Depfa) not its legal advisers." Accordingly, it "follows that for Depfa to be entitled to recovery against Wikborg Rein, it is necessary for it to establish that loss has been suffered by reason of the invalidity of the transaction, as distinct from the enforcement and credit risks already discussed." In blunt terms, the loss suffered by the bank was because the Kommune's "won't pay" rather than "can't pay".

The Court of Appeal were not required to consider the alternative argument of "no loss", but in his judgment Gross LJ expressed a degree of skepticism.

== Commentary ==
=== Haugesund Kommune v Depfa ACS Bank (No 1) ===
There was surprising little comment (critical or otherwise) in relation to the first decision. One commentator wrote that "this case will provide some comfort to lenders who find themselves in such situations". This may be a reflection of the perceived orthodoxy of the decisions on the relevant points. The case is cited with approval (in a footnote) in Dicey Morris & Collins.

=== Haugesund Kommune v DEPFA ACS Bank (No 2) ===
Commentary on the second decision was generally favourable. One commentator focused on the key distinction between what the court called category 1 (general advice) and category 2 (specific advice), noting that "[t]he decision is helpful because it reaffirms that a solicitor advising on specific aspects of a complex transaction does not usually advise and owe a category 1 (advice) duty. The solicitor's duty is usually limited to the category 2 provision of accurate information and he will be liable only for the consequences of that information being wrong."

Another expressed the view that "[t]he decision in this case can be viewed as merely the application of the Saamco principles to complex factual circumstances. The complexity of those circumstances is demonstrated by the fact that Tomlinson J and Rix LJ (with whom Gross LJ implicitly sided) disagreed as to whether Wikborg Rein had taken on specific or general duties in relation to the transactions (and therefore whether the case was of category 1 or category 2 under the Saamco principle)", before adding "[a]pplications of the Saamco principle will always be heavily fact sensitive, and it is for that reason that solicitors should consider carefully (and seek to strictly define, if possible) the nature of their duties to their client when providing advice on complex transactions. Although it will not be determinative, the wording of engagement letters will be highly relevant to any subsequent consideration of the duties assumed by the solicitor."
