= Credit Suisse International v Stichting Vestia Groep =

- Court: High Court
- Full case name: Credit Suisse International v Stichting Vestia Groep
- Decided: 3 October 2014
- Citation: [2014] EWHC 3103 (Comm)

Court membership
- Judge sitting: Andrew Smith J

Credit Suisse International v Stichting Vestia Groep [2014] EWHC 3103 (Comm) (3 October 2014) was a decision of the High Court of Justice relating to the doctrine of ultra vires and the effect of contractual representations made under an ISDA Master Agreement on the doctrine.

== Background ==
Credit Suisse is a global investment bank. Stichting Vestia Groep (called "Vestia" in the judgment) is a Dutch social housing association. Credit Suisse and Vestia had entered into an ISDA Master Agreement "as of" 9 November 2010 in the 2002 form, and had then entered into various derivative transactions under that agreement. On 19 June 2012 Credit Suisse purported to terminate the various transactions on the basis that Vestia had failed to provide security due under the terms of a credit support annex. The amounts due upon early termination were €83,196,829. Vestia disputed that it was liable to pay those amounts on three grounds:

1. Vestia did not have legal capacity to enter into the transactions
2. the parties who had entered into the transactions on behalf of Vestia lacked the necessary authority to do so
3. the termination notice sent by Credit Suisse was invalid because at the time it was sent Vestia were not in default of their contractual obligations.

Although the judgment dealt with all three issues, it was the decision of the court in relation to the first issue (capacity to enter into contracts) which excited the most comment. Separately, Vestia also disputed the amount claimed by Credit Suisse.

The first instance hearing lasted a total of 15 days. The two individuals who had entered into the transactions on behalf of Vestia, Mr de Vries and Mr Staal, did not appear or give evidence. At the time of trial Vestia either had brought or intended to bring civil proceedings against Mr Staal and Mr de Vries, and additionally Mr de Vries faced criminal charges in respect of "kickbacks" that he is alleged to have received (albeit not in relation to the transactions under consideration or any transactions with Credit Suisse). The court accepted that "they would not be likely to acknowledge that they acted without authority whether or not they did so."

== Judgment ==
In a lengthy judgment, Andrew Smith J recounted the background, including the background to and reasons for the existence of Vestia. He also summarised the expert evidence he had heard in relation to Dutch law, and the particulars of the individual trades entered into between Credit Suisse and Vestia under the ISDA Master Agreement.

=== Capacity issue ===
The court dealt with the capacity of Vestia to enter into transactions first. According to the joint expert report, under section 2:7 of the Dutch Civil Code legal entities have the right to invoke the nullity of a transaction if such transaction entered into by such entity cannot serve to realise the objects of such entity and the other party to such transaction knew, or should have been aware, that such objects and purposes have been exceeded. The court noted that although the contractual provisions were governed by English law, under the Rome Convention issues of capacity fell outside of that framework, and following the decision of the Court of Appeal in Haugesund Kommune v DEPFA ACS Bank [2010] EWCA Civ 579 the issue of capacity was to be determined according to English common law rules. The judge accepted that as a matter of Dutch law Vestia has capacity as a matter of Dutch law only to enter into transactions which genuinely constitute hedges against its borrowing liabilities, and that as certain of the contracts entered into were (in the view of the court) for speculation, they were ultra vires.

However, Credit Suisse argued that even though Vestia lacked capacity, it had held itself out as having the necessary capacity, and should not be able to plead incapacity as a defence to an otherwise valid claim.

=== Authority issue ===
Vestia argued that the transactions were entered into by Mr de Vries or Mr Staal without their authority. The court held this issue fell to be determined by reference to English law, and so Credit Suisse would need to show that Mr de Vries or Mr Staal had either actual authority or ostensible authority. The court held that they did not have ostensible authority, as Vestia had never "held them out" as having such authority. The judge held that "if the disputed contracts were outside the capacity of Vestia, under English law, applying its private international law principles, the contracts would be considered to be void on the basis they were made without authority."

=== Representations / estoppel argument ===
Having lost on both the capacity and authority issues, Credit Suisse sought to argue that Vestia were estopped from raising those arguments by virtue of the representations that they had given under the ISDA Master Agreement to the effect that it had all necessary capacity and power to enter into the transactions. The court endorsed the comments of Hobhouse J at first instance in Westdeutsche Landesbank Girozentrale v Islington LBC [1994] 4 All ER 890 at 905B that if the contract was ultra vires and void then the representations were similarly void (called, somewhat confusingly, the "bootstraps" argument). However the court noted that whilst the transactions were void, the ISDA Master Agreement itself was not (as Vestia was entitled to enter into derivatives for hedging purposes, just not speculative purposes). Accordingly, in this case the representations survived. The court noted that similar representations had made in a standalone management certificate signed on behalf of Vestia.

The court referred to rules of contractual estoppel as summarised in Peekay Intermark Ltd v Australia and New Zealand Banking Group Ltd [2006] EWCA Civ 386:

There is no reason in principle why parties to a contract should not agree that a certain state of affairs should form the basis for the transaction, whether it be the case or not. For example, it may be desirable to settle a disagreement as to an existing state of affairs in order to establish a clear basis for the contract itself and its subsequent performance. Where parties express an agreement of that kind in a contractual document neither can subsequently deny the existence of the facts and matters upon which they have agreed, at least so far as concerns those aspects of their relationship to which the agreement was directed. The contract itself gives rise to an estoppel: ...

Whilst the judge was clearly mindful of, and concerned about, the edict that "an entity cannot achieve what it has no power to do simply by stating or promising that it has the power, and that underlying the doctrine of ultra vires is a policy of protecting the public: see Hazell v Hammersmith and Fulham LBC [1992] 2 AC 1, 36F/G per Lord Templeman", he nonetheless departed from that strict position: "But there seems to me no reason that a legal entity should not in a valid contract undertake that the contract will not be used as a vehicle for purported transactions that are invalid because they are outside their capacity."

=== Notice argument ===
The judge also rejected Vestia's various arguments that the notice was invalid when served.

== Commentary ==
Most of the commentary on the case has focused upon the use of the representations to estop Vestia from relying upon what would otherwise be a lack of capacity to enter into transactions, and the important modification of the "bootstraps" rule.
