= Fountain Court Chambers =

- Headquarters: London, EC4; United Kingdom
- No. of offices: 2: London and Singapore
- Major practice areas: Commercial law
- Key people: Richard Handyside KC (Head of Chambers)
- Date founded: 1970s (present location)
- Website: www.fountaincourt.co.uk

Fountain Court Chambers is a set of commercial barristers based in the Temple in London and with offices in Singapore. It has 116 full members (in addition to door tenants), of whom 48 are silks. It is in the Magic Circle.

The head of chambers, since 2023, is Richard Handyside KC. The deputy head of chambers is Patrick Goodall KC, the senior clerk is Alex Taylor and the head of administration is Julie Parker.

== History ==
It is possible to trace Fountain Court's origins to the early part of the Twentieth Century, but its period of sustained success dates from after the Second World War.

Its reputation for commercial litigation developed in the late 1940s and 1950s and its standing as a 'magic circle' chambers was cemented in the 1960s and 1970s.

Numerous members of chambers have gone on to hold high judicial office. The most eminent is Lord Bingham KG, who served as Master of the Rolls, Lord Chief Justice and Senior Law Lord. Other notable members include Leslie Scarman SC (later Lord Scarman), Alan Orr QC (later Lord Justice Orr), Melford Stevenson QC (later Mr Justice Melford Stevenson), Peter Webster QC (later Mr Justice Webster), Peter Scott QC (head of chambers 1994–1999 and former chairman of the bar), Conrad Dehn QC (head of chambers 1984–1989), Christopher Bathurst QC (Viscount Bledisloe and head of chambers 1989–1994), Mark Potter QC (later President of the Family Division), Henry Brooke QC (later Lord Justice Brooke and vice-president of the Civil Division of the Court of Appeal), Denis Henry QC (later Lord Justice Henry), Lord Goldsmith QC (later Attorney General), Trevor Philipson QC, Charles Falconer QC (later Lord Chancellor), Nicholas Underhill QC (now Lord Justice Underhill), Nicholas Stadlen QC (later Mr Justice Stadlen), Marcus Smith QC (now Mr Justice Marcus Smith), David Waksman QC (now Mr Justice Waksman), Professor Andrew Burrows QC (now Lord Burrows, a justice of the Supreme Court), Michael Green QC (now Mr Justice Michael Green) and Sir Francis Jacobs QC (later Advocate General of the European Court of Justice).

Notable current members include Richard Lissack KC, David Railton KC, Timothy Dutton CBE KC (head of chambers 2008–2013 and former chairman of the Bar), Stephen Moriarty KC (head of chambers 2013–2018 and chairman of the Commercial Bar Association), Bankim Thanki KC (head of chambers 2018-2023), Patricia Robertson KC (past Vice-Chair of the Bar Standards Board), Richard Handyside KC (current head of chambers), Andrew Mitchell KC (current vice-chair of the Bar Standards Board) and Patrick Goodall KC (current deputy head of chambers).

Other previous heads of chambers include Anthony Boswood QC (1999–2003) who died in 2022, and Michael Brindle QC (2003–2008), who is now a door tenant.

Other current door tenants include Lord Wilson (a former Justice of the Supreme Court), Sir Andrew Smith (a former Judge of the High Court), Professor Lawrence Boo (Singapore), Arvind Datar SA (India), Gaurav Pachnanda SA (India), Zal Andhyarujina SA (India), Kanaga Dharmananda SC (Australia), Peter Watts KC (New Zealand), Eric A Schwartz (USA), David R Wingfield (Canada), Ian Benjamin SC (Trinidad and Tobago), Sebastian Said (Cayman Islands) and Professor Luca G Radicati di Brozolo (Italy).

In 2014, Fountain Court opened an office in Singapore's financial district.

== Notable cases ==
Members of Fountain Court Chambers have appeared in many landmark cases and high-profile commercial disputes.

In the well-known House of Lords’ case of Caparo v Dickman, all counsel on both sides were from Fountain Court. Several members of the Chambers were also prominent figures in acting for the Bank of England in the celebrated Three Rivers litigation, a case which led to several appeals to the House of Lords. Numerous members of Fountain Court Chambers were involved in the Lloyds litigation which dominated the work of the Commercial Court in the 1990s, and produced two significant appeals in the House of Lords.

In addition, members were involved in the Bank Charges litigation (a test case which ended up in the House of Lords), the RBS Rights Issue case, various high-value PPI matters and the FCA Test Case regarding business interruption insurance claims arising as a result of the global COVID-19 pandemic (proceeding both to the High Court and by way of 'leapfrog' appeal to the Supreme Court).

Other recent substantial cases in which members of Fountain Court appeared include SFO v ENRC, Autonomy/Hewlett-Packard v Lynch & Hussain, the Ingenious litigation, Law Debenture v Ukraine, litigation arising from Barclays' $11 billion 2008 capital raising in Qatar, Palladian Partners & others v Republic of Argentina, R (on the application of PACCAR Inc and others) v Competition Appeal Tribunal and others and the so-called 'Tuna bonds' litigation.
