= Sinclair v Brougham =

- Court: House of Lords
- Citation: [1914] AC 398
- Transcript: judgment

Court membership
- Judges sitting: Viscount Haldane LC; Lord Dunedin; Lord Atkinson; Lord Parker; Lord Sumner

Laws applied
- Overruled by
- Westdeutsche Landesbank Girozentrale v Islington LBC [1996]

Keywords
- Ultra vires, money had and received

Sinclair v Brougham [1914] AC 398 is an English trusts law case, concerning the right of depositors to recover sums which were deposited (or loaned) to a building society under contracts of deposit which were beyond the powers of (ultra vires) the building society.

== Facts ==
The Birkbeck Permanent Benefit Society was formed under the Benefit Building Societies Act 1836], but was never registered under the Building Societies Act 1874. Under rule 35 of the society’s constitution it was allowed to borrow money. Rule 97 said that losses should be shared among the two classes of shareholders in different proportions. From the start it developed a banking business, the Birkbeck Bank, but this was wound up in 1911. The four groups of creditors were (1) A shareholders who would be repaid on maturity, (2) B shareholders who had permanent shares (3) trade creditors and (4) depositors. The trade creditors and the A shareholders had their claims settled by an agreement. The liquidator brought an action to determine the others' rights, given that technically, if the contracts for deposits were void, the depositors had no straight forward personal claim.

Neville J held that rule 35 was not a question of the society's capacity, but it was a power, and the power to borrow had to be for proper purposes. The whole banking business was ultra vires and so the bank's depositors could recover nothing. In the Court of Appeal, Lord Cozens-Hardy MR, Buckley LJ held the depositors would be paid last, after the shareholders. Fletcher Moulton LJ dissented.

== Judgment ==
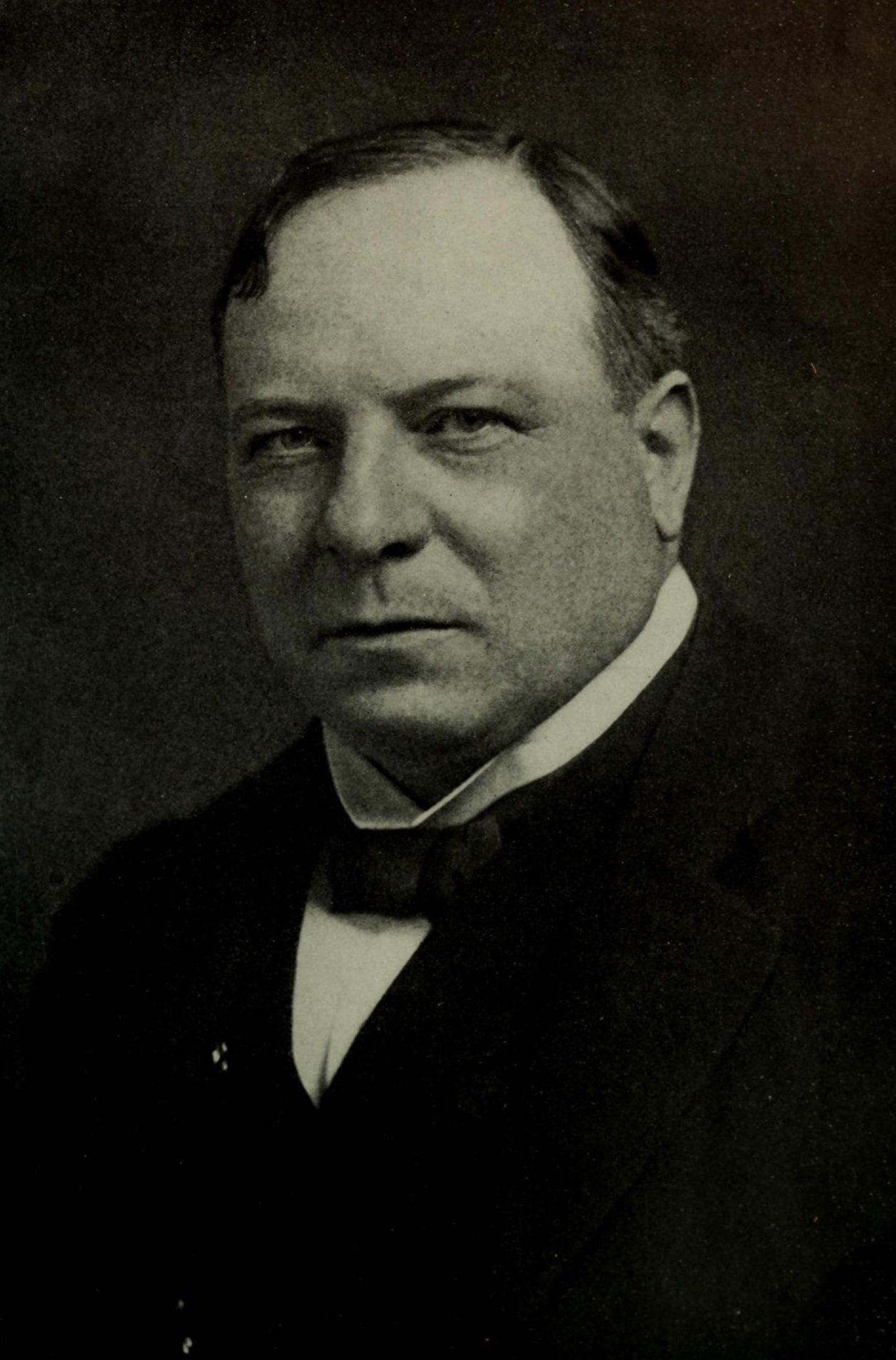
Viscount Haldane LC.

The House of Lords held that the bank's actions had been ultra vires and void, and that there was no possibility for the depositors to recover under quasi-contract. An implied contract, as that was, would necessarily be void as well, and thus circumvent the point of saying that the deposit contracts were ultra vires and void in the first place. But instead, given that the depositors must plainly be paid back above the shareholders, an equity was created to give them a first claim. Lord Dunedin, "Is English equity to retire defeated from the task which other systems of equity have conquered? No."

Viscount Haldane LC held the power of the building society had to be limited to its proper objects, so the banking business was ultra vires. Depositors were not entitled to recover their money paid by them on an ultra vires contract of loan on the footing of money had and received by the society to their use. Applying the principle of Re Hallett's Estate that the assets remaining after payment of the outside creditors must be taken to represent in part moneys which the depositors could follow, as having been invalidly borrowed, and in part moneys which the society could follow, as having been wrongfully employed by its agents in the banking business, and (subject to any application by any individual depositor or shareholder with a view to tracing his own money into any particular asset, and to the costs of the liquidation) ought to be distributed pari passu between the depositors and the unadvanced shareholders according to the amounts respectively credited to them in the books of the society at the commencement of the winding-up.

Lord Dunedin, Lord Atkinson, Lord Parker and Lord Sumner concurred.

== Significance ==
The case was subsequently overruled by a majority of the House of Lords in Westdeutsche Landesbank Girozentrale v Islington LBC [1996] UKHL 12 (22 May 1996). The majority held that it was simply wrong, and should be overruled. The minority expressed doubt about the outcome, indicating that the depositors ought to have been able to recover under a resulting trust, but thought that the case should not be overruled. The effect of the decision in Westdeutsche on Sinclair v Brougham was considered at some length by the Court of Appeal in Haugesund Kommune v DEPFA ACS Bank [2010] EWCA Civ 579.

However the editors of Hayton & Mitchell say this case might nonetheless have been rightly decided, "depending on whether the ultra vires depositors' claim to recover their money on the ground of failure of consideration was founded on the assertion that the building society had failed to repay their money, or on the assertion that their contracts with the building society had been void from the beginning."

== See also ==
- English trusts law
- In re Guardian Permanent Benefit Building Society (1882) 23 Ch. D. 40 considered and distinguished.
- Blackburn and District Benefit Building Society v Cunliffe Brooks & Co (1885) 29 Ch. D. 902 overruled.
