= Justice Webster =

Justice Webster may refer to:

- Bergljot Webster (born 1966), justice of the Norwegian Supreme Court
- J. Stanley Webster (1877–1962), justice of the Washington State Supreme Court
- Judith Webster (fl. 1980s–2000s), chief justice of the Provincial Court of Manitoba
- Peter Webster (judge) (1924–2009), English High Court judge
- Richard Webster, 1st Viscount Alverstone (1842–1915), Lord Chief Justice of England and Wales

== See also ==
- Judge Webster (disambiguation)
