= Peter Webster =

Peter Webster may refer to:

- Peter Webster (artist) (fl. 2000s–2010s), English artist and sculptor
- Peter Webster (footballer) (1932–2025), Australian rules footballer
- Peter J. Webster (born 1942), meteorologist and climate dynamicist
- Peter Webster (judge) (1924–2009), British barrister and judge
