= Davidson Bros., Inc. v. D. Katz & Sons, Inc. =

1994 Superior Court of New Jersey case

Davidson Bros., Inc. v. D. Katz & Sons, Inc., 643 A.2d 642 (App. Div. 1994), was a case decided by the Appellate Division of the Superior Court of New Jersey that first applied public policy considerations instead of the touch and concern doctrine when deciding the validity of a restrictive covenant.

== Factual background ==
Davidson Bros., Inc. operated several grocery stores in downtown New Brunswick, New Jersey. After vacating one inner city supermarket, Davidson added a restrictive covenant not to compete to the lease for the vacated property. The covenant disallowed the lessee from operating another grocery store in the space.

== Decision ==
The New Jersey Supreme Court granted Davidson's petition for certification and reversed and remanded (to the Appellate Division of the Superior Court of New Jersey) for a trial. In doing so, the Court determined that "rigid adherence" to the "touch and concern" requirement was no longer warranted. It held that enforceability of a covenant would depend on its reasonableness, and that the principle of "touch and concern" is "but one of the factors". The Court then described eight factors to be considered in resolving the reasonableness issue:

1. The intention of the parties when the covenant was executed, and whether the parties had a viable purpose which did not at the time interfere with existing commercial laws, such as antitrust laws, or public policy.
2. Whether the covenant had an impact on the considerations exchanged when the covenant was originally executed. This may provide a measure of the value to the parties of the covenant at the time.
3. Whether the covenant clearly and expressly sets forth the restrictions.
4. Whether the covenant was in writing, recorded, and if so, whether the subsequent grantee had actual notice of the covenant.
5. Whether the covenant is reasonable concerning area, time or duration. Covenants that extend for perpetuity or beyond the terms of a lease may often be unreasonable.
6. Whether the covenant imposes an unreasonable restraint on trade or secures a monopoly for the covenantor. This may be the case in areas where there is limited space available to conduct certain business activities and a covenant not to compete burdens all or most available locales to prevent them from competing in such an activity.
7. Whether the covenant interferes with the public interest.
8. Whether, even if the covenant was reasonable at the time it was executed, "changed circumstances" now make the covenant unreasonable.

The Appellate Division of the Superior Court of New Jersey held that the covenant not to compete was invalid because it was against public policy. The availability of supermarkets in inner city areas was essential to fighting urban blight and preventing a Food desert, and this could not be outweighed by the property interests of Davidson. This usage of public policy grounds instead of the touch and concern doctrine for analyzing covenants predated the same technique used in the Restatement Third of Servitudes.
