= A Restatement of the English Law of Unjust Enrichment =

Legal treatise by Andrew Burrows

- Author: Andrew Burrows
- Language: English
- Subject: Unjust enrichment
- Publication date: 2012
- Publication place: England

A Restatement of the English Law of Unjust Enrichment is a legal treatise by Andrew Burrows, written in collaboration with an advisory group of academics, judges and practitioners. The treatise takes the form of a restatement that is akin to the American Law Institute's highly influential Restatements of the Law. Restatements are very rare in common law jurisdictions other than the United States.

== Advisory Group ==
- Alan Rodger, Baron Rodger of Earlsferry, former Justice of the Supreme Court of the United Kingdom
- Robert Walker, Baron Walker of Gestingthorpe, non-permanent judge of Hong Kong's Court of Final Appeal, former Justice of the Supreme Court of the United Kingdom
- Jonathan Mance, Baron Mance, Justice of the Supreme Court of the United Kingdom
- Sir Martin Moore-Bick, Lord Justice of Appeal of the Court of Appeal of England and Wales
- Sir Jack Beatson, Lord Justice of Appeal of the Court of Appeal of England and Wales
- Sir Terence Etherton, Chancellor of the High Court
- Sir Launcelot Henderson, judge of the High Court of Justice, Chancery Division
- James Edelman, justice of the High Court of Australia
- Stephen Moriarty, member of Fountain Court Chambers
- Laurence Rabinowitz, member of One Essex Court
- Stephen Elliott, member of One Essex Court
- Andrew Scott, member of Blackstone Chambers
- Robert Chambers, professor at University College London
- Gerard McMeel, professor at University of Bristol
- Charles Mitchell, professor at University College London
- Robert Stevens, professor at University College London
- William Swadling, reader at the University of Oxford
- Andrew Tettenborn, professor at the University of Swansea
- Graham Virgo, professor at the University of Cambridge
