= Restatements of the Law =

American Law Institute reference series

In American jurisprudence, the Restatements of the Law are a set of treatises on legal subjects that seek to inform judges and lawyers about general principles of common law. There are now four series of Restatements, all published by the American Law Institute, an organization of judges, legal academics, and practitioners founded in 1923.

== Connection with the rule of precedent ==
Individual Restatement volumes are essentially compilations of case law, which are common law judge-made doctrines that develop gradually over time because of the principle of stare decisis (precedent). Although Restatements of the Law are not binding authority in and of themselves, they are potentially persuasive when they are formulated over several years with extensive input from law professors, practicing attorneys, and judges. They are meant to reflect the consensus of the American legal community as to what the law is, and, in some cases, what it should become. As Harvard Law School describes the Restatements of the Law:

The ALI's aim is to distill the "black letter law" from cases, to indicate a trend in common law, and, occasionally, to recommend what a rule of law should be. In essence, they restate existing common law into a series of principles or rules.

Each Restatement section includes a black-letter principle, comments, and illustrations, and, in the form of reporters' notes, a detailed discussion of all the cases that went into the principle summarized in that one section. By citing a Restatement section in a legal brief, a lawyer may bring to the attention of a judge a carefully studied summary of court action on almost any common law legal doctrine. The judge can then consider the Restatement section and make an informed decision as to how to apply it in the case at hand. While courts are under no formal obligation to adopt Restatement sections as the law, they often do because such sections accurately restate the already-established law in that jurisdiction, or on issues of first impression, and are persuasive in terms of demonstrating the current trend that other jurisdictions are following.

Restatements are rare in common law jurisdictions outside of the United States, where law reports are more frequent. Former Justice of the High Court of Australia William Gummow attributes the requirement for Restatements in the United States to the lack of a nationwide court of final common law adjudication.

On subjects where the law is not settled or states differ too widely, the ALI has not been able to produce a Restatement. In the area of criminal law, for example, the ALI formulated the Model Penal Code, intended to guide legislators on what statutes they should enact as law.

== Impact ==
The Restatements of the Law is one of the most respected and well-used sources of secondary authority, covering nearly every area of common law. While considered secondary authority (compare to primary authority), the authoritativeness of the Restatements of the Law is evidenced by their acceptance by courts throughout the United States. The Restatements have been cited in over 150,000 reported court decisions.

In December 1923, Benjamin N. Cardozo explained the prospective importance of the Restatements in a lecture at Yale Law School:

When, finally, it goes out under the name and with the sanction of the Institute, after all this testing and retesting, it will be something less than a code and something more than a treatise. It will be invested with unique authority, not to command, but to persuade. It will embody a composite thought and speak a composite voice. Universities and bench and bar will have had a part in its creation. I have great faith in the power of such a restatement to unify our law.

Andrew Burrows refers to the Restatements of the Law as informing the work of the advisory group that he convened to produce A Restatement of the English Law of Unjust Enrichment in the introduction to that work.

== Criticism ==
Some of the most renowned legal scholars in the United States, including Judge Richard Posner and law professor Lawrence M. Friedman, have heavily criticized the Restatements, characterizing them as badly flawed.

In a 2007 article, professor Kristin David Adams surveyed and summarized the various critiques of the Restatements, which included the following:

1. its drafters are overwhelmingly elite and hence elitist;
2. the Restatements are too conservative and not as progressive as intended;
3. the Restatements essentially reify the law and legal profession rather than trying to incorporate "real world" empirical insights from other disciplines;
4. they have insulated the law from more aggressive reform;
5. they are based on the illusion that the common law is more rational than it actually is or can be;
6. they lag behind the "real world" concerns of practicing lawyers; and
7. the Restatements are too progressive.

Adams then defended the Restatement project by arguing that all these critiques were actually critiques of the common law itself.

== Editions ==
=== First ===
In the period between 1923 and 1944, the American Law Institute published Restatements of Agency, Conflict of Laws, Contracts, Judgments, Property, Restitution, Security, Torts, and Trusts. This series was later expanded in 2015 and 2019 with publication of the Restatements of Employment Law and Liability Insurance respectively.

=== Second ===
In 1952, the Institute started the Restatement, Second – updates of the original Restatements with new analyses and concepts with and expanded authorities. (A Restatement on Foreign Relations Law of the United States was also undertaken.) The second Restatement of the Law was undertaken to reflect changes and developments in the law, as well as to implement a new format that provided more expansive commentary and more meaningful illustrative material, affording fuller statements of the reasons for the positions taken. For example, the volumes generally included a set of Reporter's Notes that detailed the reasons on which the principles and rules stated were based and the authorities that supported them. And for the convenience of legal researchers, the second series of volumes also provided cross-references to the key numbers of the West Publishing Company's Digest System and to the American Law Reports annotations of the Lawyers Cooperative Publishing Company. In addition, appendix volumes included digest paragraphs of decisions of state appellate courts and federal courts citing the Restatements on each subject.

=== Third ===
The third series of Restatements was started in 1987 with a new Restatement of the Foreign Relations Law of the United States. The Restatement, Third, now includes volumes on Agency, the Law Governing Lawyers, Property (Mortgages, Servitudes, Wills and Other Donative Transfers), Restitution and Unjust Enrichment, Suretyship and Guaranty, Torts (Products Liability, Apportionment of Liability, Economic Harm, and Physical and Emotional Harm), Trusts, and Unfair Competition.

=== Fourth ===
A volume on the Foreign Relations Law of the United States, released in 2018, was the first in the Restatement, Fourth, series to be completed; however, rather than being a complete update to the previous volume from the third series on the same subject, it is instead limited to selected topics in treaties, jurisdiction, and sovereign immunity.

== Current versions ==
1. Restatement of Agency, Third (2006)
2. Restatement of Conflict of Laws, Second (1971; revised 1986 and 1988)
3. Restatement of Contracts, Second (1981)
4. Restatement of Employment Law (2015)
5. Restatement of Foreign Relations Law of the United States, Third (1987; some topics superseded by Restatement of Torts, Foreign Relations Law of the United States, Fourth)
6. Restatement of Foreign Relations Law of the United States, Fourth (2018; limited to selected topics in treaties, jurisdiction, and sovereign immunity)
7. Restatement of Judgments, Second (1982)
8. Restatement of Law Governing Lawyers, Third (2000)
9. Restatement of Liability Insurance (2019)
10. Restatement of Property (1936–40; mostly superseded by Restatement of Property, Second and Third volumes)
11. Restatement of Property, Second, Landlord and Tenant (1977)
12. Restatement of Property, Third, Mortgages (1997)
13. Restatement of Property, Third, Servitudes (2000)
14. Restatement of Property, Third, Wills and Other Donative Transfers (1999, 2003, and 2011)
15. Restatement of Restitution and Unjust Enrichment, Third (2011)
16. Restatement of Security (Division I largely superseded by the Article 9 of the Uniform Commercial Code; Division II entirely superseded by Restatement of Suretyship and Guaranty, Third)
17. Restatement of Suretyship and Guaranty, Third (1996)
18. Restatement of Torts, Second (1965, 1977, and 1979; some sections superseded by Restatement of Torts, Third)
19. Restatement of Torts, Third, Apportionment of Liability (2000)
20. Restatement of Torts, Third, Liability for Economic Harm (2020)
21. Restatement of Torts, Third, Liability for Physical and Emotional Harm (2009 and 2012)
22. Restatement of Torts, Third, Products Liability (1997)
23. Restatement of Trusts, Third (2003, 2007, and 2012)
24. Restatement of Unfair Competition, Third (1995)
