= Judge Webster =

Judge Webster may refer to:

- J. Stanley Webster (1877–1962), judge of the United States District Court for the Eastern District of Washington
- William H. Webster (1924–2025), judge of the United States District Court for the Eastern District of Missouri

== See also ==
- Justice Webster (disambiguation)
