= Jack Beatson =

English judge (born 1948)

The Right Honourable Sir Jack Beatson FBA

Lord Justice of Appeal
- In office January 2013 – February 2018
- Monarch: Elizabeth II

Rouse Ball Professor of English Law
- In office 1 October 1993 – 30 September 2003

Sir Jack Beatson, PC, FBA (born 1948), was a Lord Justice of Appeal from January 2013 to February 2018 when he became a full-time arbitrator at 24 Lincoln's Inn Fields. He was previously a High Court judge in the Queen's Bench Division, a Law Commissioner and Rouse Ball Professor of English Law at the University of Cambridge.

== Career ==
Beatson was called to the Bar at the Inner Temple in 1972, becoming a member of the governing council in 1993 as an honorary Bencher. He was Law Commissioner for England and Wales for five years from July 1989 to 1994, working on contract and commercial law, civil evidence, damages, administrative law, and financial services. He rejoined Essex Court Chambers in 1994, and appointed a Queen's Counsel in 1998.

=== Academic career ===
He was a law lecturer at the University of Bristol 1972–73, then became a law tutor at Merton College, Oxford until 1994. He was the founding director of the Centre for Public Law (1997–2001) and is an Honorary Fellow of St John's College, Cambridge. He was Rouse Ball Professor of English Law at the University of Cambridge from 1993 to 2003. Lord Falconer called him an "outstanding academic lawyer".

In July 2001 he became a fellow of the British Academy and he was President of the British Academy of Forensic Sciences 2007–09. In 2012 Beatson was a member of the advisory group that produced A Restatement of the English Law of Unjust Enrichment.

=== Judicial career ===
Beatson was a Crown Court Recorder in 1994 and a Deputy High Court Judge in 1999. He was appointed to the High Court on 29 April 2003, receiving the customary knighthood, and was assigned to the Queen's Bench Division. On 26 July 2012, it was announced he would be appointed a Lord Justice of Appeal to fill a forthcoming vacancy, which he took up in January 2014. He was sworn in as a member of Her Majesty's Most Honourable Privy Council on 5 February 2013.

In 2018, Beatson became a full-time arbitrator at 24 Lincoln's Inn Fields. He has also been appointed to part-time positions as a Justice of the Court of Appeal at the Astana International Financial Centre in Astana, Kazakhstan. and the Cayman Islands Court of Appeal.

== Books ==
- Administrative Law: Cases and Materials (2nd edition, 1989, with M. Matthews)
- Anson's Law of Contract (27th edition 1998, 28th edition, 2002)
- Chitty on Contract (wrote chapters on The Crown, Public Authorities and the EC, Restitution in the 29th edition, 1999, editor of the 25th, 26th and 27th editions)
- Freedom of Expression and Freedom of Information: Essays in Honour of Sir David Williams, Oxford University Press (2000, with Yvonne Cripps)
- Good faith and fault in contract law, Clarendon Press (1997, editor with Daniel Friedmann)
- Human Rights: The 1998 Act and the European Convention (2000, with S. Grosz and P. Duffy)
- Jurists Uprooted: German-Speaking Émigré Lawyers in Twentieth Century Britain (2004, editor with Reinhard Zimmermann)
- New Directions in European Public Law, Hart Publishing (1998, editor with Takis Tridimas)

== Personal life ==
He attended Whittingehame College, Brighton, then studied law at Brasenose College, Oxford. He is married and has a daughter and a deceased son.
