= Pigot's Case =

English legal case

- Full case name: Winchcombe v Pigot
- Decided: 1614, Trinity Term
- Citations: (1614) 11 CoRep 26b [1558-1774] All ER Rep 50; 77 ER 1177

Court membership
- Judge sitting: Sir Edward Coke

Keywords
- non est factum

Pigot's Case (1614) 11 CoRep 26b, [1558-1774] All ER Rep 50, 77 ER 1177 is a 17th-century decision of the English courts. It is often simply referred to by reference to the rule in Pigot's Case. The rule has been described as a "ghost of the past".

== Facts ==
Henry Pigot was indebted to Benedict Winchcombe, and on 2 March 1611 they executed a bond by way of deed relating to the indebtedness. Subsequently, in 1614, Winchcombe was appointed as High Sheriff of Oxfordshire. At this point, some well-meaning but unknown person altered the deed to record this fact by inserting the words "Vicecomiti Comitatus Oxon" (Sheriff of the County of Oxford) immediately after the words Benedict Winchcombe, Esq and before the specification of the amount due. No other changes were made to the deed.

In 1614 Winchcombe brought an action against Pigot on the deed. Pigot, relying on existing case law, entered a plea of "non est factum" (it is not my deed), essentially arguing that because the deed had been altered, it was not the deed that he had originally entered into three years previously.

== Decision ==
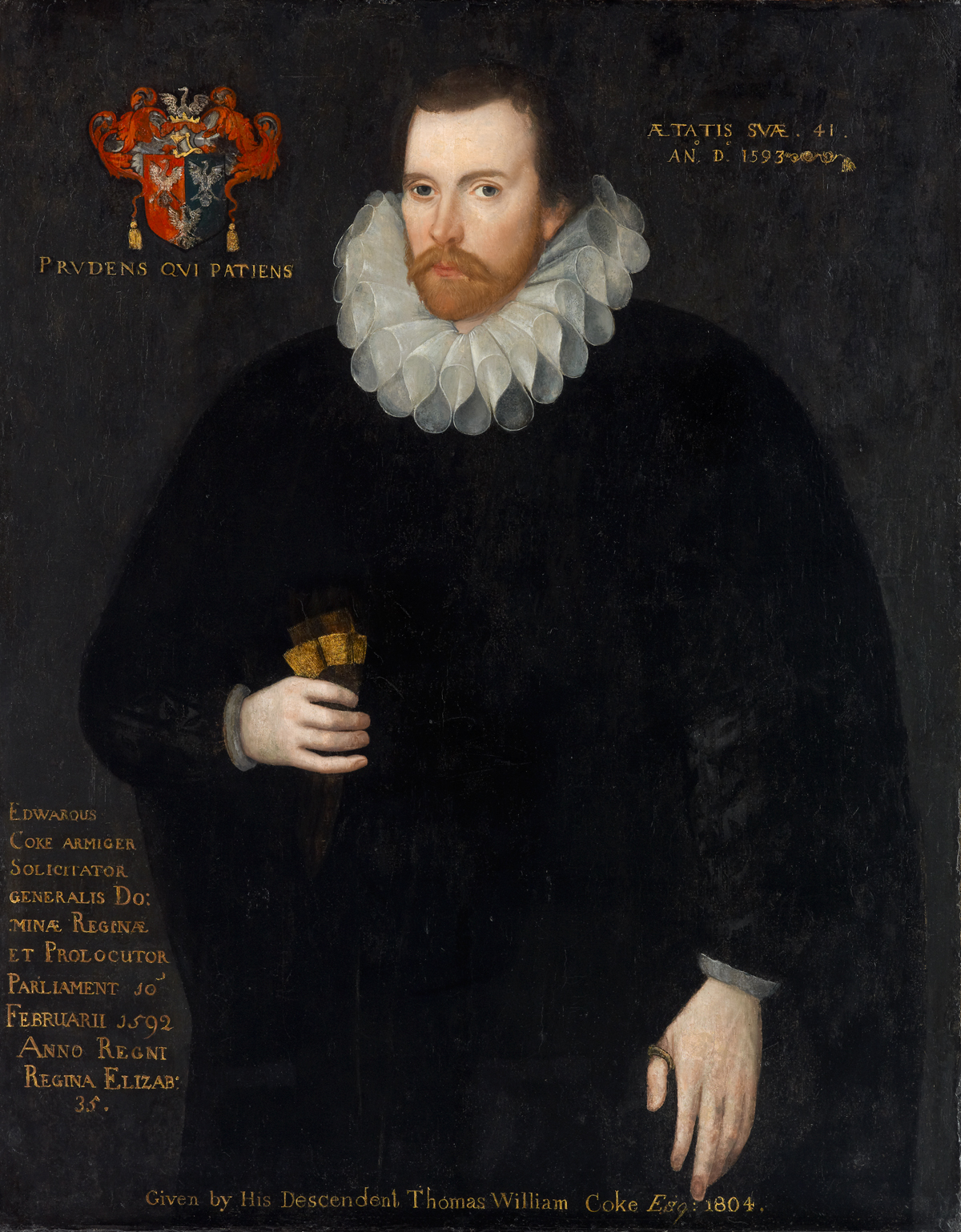
Lord Coke.

The case came before the eminent 17th-century English jurist, Lord Coke.

The jury had found as a fact that the amendments (a) were made by a stranger, and (b) that they did so without the permission of Winchcombe. The Court further held that the amendment was not a material one.

Coke held:

when any deed is altered in a point material, by the plaintiff himself, or by any stranger, without the privity of the obligee, be it by interlineation, addition, rasing, or by drawing of a pen through a line, or through the midst of any material word, that the deed thereby becomes void.

Much of Coke's judgment was pure obiter dictum. Having found that the amendments were not material and were made by a stranger, in the way in which Coke commonly did, he still dedicated the larger part of his judgment to consider the legal implications of material alterations by strangers and alterations by parties to the agreement. However, those obiter comments served to formulate the common law jurisprudence on the subject until today.

The decision has been summarised to the effect that:

1. a deed is void if it is altered in any way by the promisee (the one to whom the deed is made);
2. a deed is also void if altered in a material way by a stranger (that is, a third party) to the transaction; however
3. a deed is not void if it is altered in a way that is not material by a stranger to the transaction.

The rule itself has now been modified by subsequent cases (some of which are summarised below). The most recent edition of Chitty on Contracts describes the rule as:

If a promisee, without the consent of the promisor, deliberately makes a material alteration in a specialty or other instrument containing words of contract, this will discharge the promisor from all liability thereon, even though the original words of the instrument are still legible.

== Earlier cases ==
Although the strict consequences of a party to the deed making a non-material alteration to the document appear harsh today, the case actually softened the effect of a much harsher line of earlier authorities. In raising his plea, Pigot was relying upon decisions such as Elliott v Holder (1567) 3 Dyer 261b, 73 ER 580 where it had been held that any alteration of a deed made it "utterly void":

For the deed is entire, and when after the delivery it is altered in any point, otherwise than it was at the time of the delivery, it has become void in its entirety and is not his deed in every part as he delivered it.

== Subsequent cases ==
In 1791 the scope of the rule in Pigot's Case was extended from deeds to all contracts and other legal instruments by the decision in Master v Millar (1791) 14 TR 320.

The rule remains good law in most common law jurisdictions, and has been cited with approval many times, including by the Privy Council in Goss v Chilcott [1996] UKPC 17.

Other recent citations of the rule include:

- Raiffeisen Zentralbank Osterreich AG v Crossseas Shipping Ltd [1999] 1 All ER (Comm), held that an alteration to a guarantee by the insertion of the name and address of a service agent was material so as to render the guarantee unenforceable, stating that the effect of an alteration is that the instrument sued on is no longer the instrument of the party charged and that the rule is a salutary one aimed at the elimination of fraud rather than requiring proof of it.
- Pickenham Romford Ltd v Deville [2013] EWHC 2330 (Ch), held that an alteration to a debenture in relation to names of properties prior to filing with the Land Registry did not invalidate it as (1) the alteration must be deliberate, not made accidentally or mistakenly; (2) the alteration must be material; (3) the alteration must be without the consent of the other party; and (4) "it is at the very least questionable" whether the rule applies to an alteration made by a stranger.
- Co-operative Bank plc v Tipper [1996] 4 All ER 366, where the harshness of the rule was noted.
- Habibsons Bank Ltd v Standard Chartered Bank (Hong Kong) Ltd [2010] EWCA Civ 1335
- Sellin v Price (1867) LR 2 Ex 189. The case involved a deed which, when executed, contained no schedule, but one was attached later. The court held that the attachment of the schedule altered the deed in a material particular and rendered it void.
- Re Howgate and Osborne's Contract [1902] 1 Ch 451. A correction of the first name of a person from "William" to "Edward Thomas" was held not to be material.
- Lombard Finance Ltd v Brookplain Ltd [1991] 1 WLR 271. In a guarantee a company was described as "Brookplain Trading Company Ltd", whereas its correct name was "Brookplain Trading Ltd". The guarantee was altered by someone other than the two sureties by deleting the word "Company". The argument that the document was rendered void failed because the alteration was not material.

== Repeal ==
The rule has been repealed by statute in New South Wales.
