= Remedial constructive trust =

A remedial constructive trust is a type of constructive trust recognised in Australia, Ireland, New Zealand, Canada and the United States, which allows courts to give a discretionary property remedy for breaches of certain obligations, or to acknowledge various rights. It has not been recognised in English trusts law, although a number of judges have proposed that it be acknowledged.

== Australia ==
In Australia, the justification for the imposition of a remedial constructive trust has been based on the notion of an "unconscionable denial of beneficial interest", usually in property.

- Muschinski v Dodds (1985) 160 CLR 583
- Baumgartner v Baumgartner (1987) 164 CLR 137

== Canada ==
- Lac Minerals Ltd. v. International Corona Resources Ltd. [1989] 2 SCR 574
- Sun Indalex Finance, LLC v. United Steelworkers 2013 SCC 6

== See also ==
- Thorner v Majors [2009] UKHL 18, per Lord Scott
- Westdeutsche Landesbank Girozentrale v Islington LBC, per Lord Browne-Wilkinson
