= Goss v Chilcott =

- Court: Privy Council
- Full case name: (1) Murray Goss, and (2) Jennifer Goss v (1) Laurence Chilcott, and (2) Central Acceptance Limited (in liquidation)
- Decided: 23 May 1996
- Citation: [1996] UKPC 17, [1996] AC 788

Case history
- Appealed from: [1995] 1 NZLR 263

Court membership
- Judges sitting: Lord Goff of Chieveley; Lord Jauncey of Tullichettle; Lord Steyn; Lord Hoffman; Lord Cooke of Thorndon

Case opinions
- Decision by: Lord Goff of Chieveley

Keywords
- restitution, failure of consideration, change of position

Goss v Chilcott [1996] UKPC 17 (23 May 1996) is a decision of the Privy Council on appeal from New Zealand relating to the law of restitution, and in particular the requirements of total failure of consideration in relation to loans where some repayments had been made, and the defence of change of position.

== Facts ==
Mr Haddon was a director of a company called Central Acceptance Limited. Mr Haddon wished to borrow money from the company, but under New Zealand law companies were barred from lending money to their directors. Accordingly, Mr Haddon formulated a plan whereby the company would lend $30,000 to Mr and Mrs Goss (Mrs Goss was Mr Haddon's sister), and then Mr and Mrs Goss would on-lend those sums to Mr Haddon.

Mr Haddon proposed the loan to Mr and Mrs Goss to his fellow directors on 6 May 1987, although it does not appear that he made them aware that the funds were to be immediately on-loaned to him. The loan was approved for a short term (3 months), repayable in three monthly instalments, at an extremely high interest rate (33% per annum), and was to be secured by a mortgage over a nursery property owned by Mr and Mrs Goss.

A law firm drew up the necessary documentation and Mr and Mrs Goss signed it. They directed that the $30,000 be paid directly to Mr Haddon in accordance with the private arrangement that they had made. What happened next was slightly unclear, but in the event only two small interest payments were made: one by Mr Goss and a second by Mr Haddon directly. But at some point after the mortgage documentation was signed and prior to it being registered, the documents were altered to change the term of the loan from 3 months to 12 months. Mr and Mrs Goss did not know or approve of the change. Mr Haddon told the company that registration of the mortgage had been delayed, but that they had agreed to extend the loan to a 12-month term. Mr Goss also gave evidence to the effect that Mr Haddon had separately told him that the loan had been paid off.

In the event, no further loan payments were made and the company ended up going into liquidation. Mr Chilcott was appointed as the company liquidator, and he sought to enforce repayment of the loan made by the company to Mr and Mrs Goss.

At trial it was held that the amendments to the mortgage instrument rendered it void under the rule in Pigot's Case (1614) 11 Co Rep 26b, and there was no appeal against that. The court also considered whether Mr and Mrs Goss must repay the loan (without the punitive interest) as money had and received, but held that there had been no total failure of consideration. The New Zealand Court of Appeal overturned the judgement in part, accepting that the loan was void, but ordering that Mr and Mrs Goss must repay the capital sums as money had and received. Mr and Mrs Goss then appealed to the Privy Council. The New Zealand Court of Appeal also rejected an argument that Mr and Mrs Goss were acting under the undue influence of the company.

== Judgement ==
The only judgement was given by Lord Goff. In his characteristic style, Lord Goff addressed each of the legal issues sequentially. There was no appeal against the holding of the judge that the arrangement was not a sham, nor against his finding that the loan contract was void under the rule in Pigot's Case. Accordingly, he turned first to the availability of the claim in restitution.

=== Claim in restitution ===
At first instance Neazor J had held that the company could not make a claim in restitution as there had been no total failure of consideration. The Privy Council disagreed, but took a different approach from the New Zealand Court of Appeal. Lord Goff referred to the "much-quoted" speech of Viscount Simon LC in Fibrosa Spolka Akcyjna v Fairbairn Lawson Combe Barbour Ltd [1943] AC 32:

... when one is considering the law of failure of consideration and of the quasi-contractual right to recover money on that ground, it is, generally speaking, not the promise which is referred to as the consideration, but the performance of the promise ... If this were not so, there could never be any recovery of money, for failure of consideration, by the payer of the money in return for a promise of future performance, yet there are endless examples which show that money can be recovered, as for a complete failure of consideration, in cases where the promise was given but could not be fulfilled.

Lord Goff noted that normally a failure to repay a loan results in a claim in contract, but on the facts of this case that remedy was not available because of the fraudulent changes to the documentation. Accordingly, he turned to the problem of whether there had been a total failure of consideration. He noted that "although no part of the principal sum had been repaid by the appellants, two instalments of interest had been paid; and the question arises whether these two payments of interest precluded recovery on the basis that in such circumstances the failure of consideration for the advance was not total." He then answered that the view of the Court was that it did not. Payments of interest were different from payments of capital sums. However the court noted that it was possible that the documents were altered prior to one of the payments, in which case the payments would be treated as repayment of capital. However Lord Goff was unequivocal: "even if part of the capital sum had been repaid, the law would not hesitate to hold that the balance of the loan outstanding would be recoverable on the ground of failure of consideration; for at least in those cases in which apportionment can be carried out without difficulty, the law will allow partial recovery on this ground (see David Securities Pty Ltd v Commonwealth Bank of Australia (1992) 175 CLR 353, 383)."

=== Receipt of the advance ===
Lord Goff then addressed briefly the suggestion that Mr and Mrs Goss had never received the advance (because it had been paid over directly to Mr Haddon). Lord Goff unceremoniously rejected this. When the sums were paid, at their direction, to Mr Haddon, that was effectively payment to them (or, more accurately, to their order).

=== Change of position ===
Lastly, Lord Goff turned to whether Mr and Mrs Goss had a defence of change of position. In his judgement he noted that in New Zealand the defence of change of position was codified in the New Zealand Judicature Act 1908, section 94B. However, in his view the position in New Zealand was the same as that under the common law.

The Board felt unable to accept that, on the facts of the case, there was a change of position on the part of the appellants such as to render it inequitable to require them to make restitution. Even before the fraudulent amendment to the instrument, Mr and Mrs Goss were required to repay the money which had been advanced to them by the company. That obligation was not affected by the fact they had on-loaned it to another person. By lending that money on to Mr Haddon they were necessarily taking the risk that he might not be able to repay them, "in which event they themselves would have to repay it without recourse to him." The court stated that any action by Mr and Mrs Goss against Mr Haddon would now be fruitless, and that by claiming change of position they were essentially seeking to shift that loss onto the company. Lord Goff was clear: "This, in their Lordships' opinion, they cannot do. The fact that they cannot now obtain reimbursement from Mr. Haddon does not, in the circumstances of the present case, render it inequitable for them to be required to make restitution to the company in respect of the enrichment which they have received at the company's expense."

=== Ministerial receipt ===
Lord Goff also summarily dismissed the argument that this was a case of "ministerial receipt" where Mr and Mrs Goss received the money as agents for an undisclosed principal (Mr Haddon). The trial judge had found as a fact that there were two loans; one from the company to Mr and Mrs Goss, and a second loan from them to Mr Haddon.

== Commentary ==
The case is now generally accepted as authority for the proposition that in the case of loan transactions, there may be a "total" failure of consideration even if some repayments had already been made, even though strictly speaking those comments were obiter dictum. Professor Graham Virgo noted "following the approach of Lord Goff in Goss v Chilcott, whereby apportionment is available even where the claimant has made a lump sum payment, constitutes a significant way of avoiding the total failure bar, and makes the continued existence of the bar vulnerable." However, he also noted that "the Privy Council in Goss v Chilcott affirmed that the basis must fail totally".
