= Sempra Metals Ltd v IRC =

- Court: House of Lords
- Citations: [2007] UKHL 34, [2008] AC 561

Keywords
- Resulting trusts

Sempra Metals Ltd v Inland Revenue Commissioners [2007] UKHL 34 is a UK tax law case, concerning the availability of compound interest upon personal claims. The effect of the case, decided by a majority, was to reverse the outcome of Westdeutsche Landesbank Girozentrale v Islington LBC. However, the Supreme Court departed from this ruling in Prudential Assurance Co Ltd v Revenue and Customs Commissioners.

== Facts ==
Sempra Metals paid advance corporation tax on its dividends, but the tax breached EU law. Sempra Metals claimed the tax back, as it was paid under a mistake of law, and it demanded compound interest, the time value of the money. The IRC argued the award should be based on simple interest, but if compound, the rate should be the rate the Government could have borrowed at in the relevant period.

== Judgment ==
The House of Lords held that there was an action for money paid under mistakes of law, Kleinwort v Lincoln CC. There was also jurisdiction for giving compound interest. The restitutionary remedy was not like damages, so the gain would need to be measured, not the loss to the claimant. The Revenue should therefore give back its whole benefit. Simple interest would fall short of true value, so compound interest was proper.

Lord Hope, Lord Nicholls and Lord Walker held it was extremely difficult to quantify any benefit to the revenue because it did not use the money, so resort to the convention rate of interest should be had.

Lord Scott and Lord Mance dissented, saying the claim had to reflect the actual benefit received.

== See also ==
- English trust law
