= Westdeutsche Landesbank Girozentrale v Islington LBC =

English legal case

Westdeutsche Landesbank v Islington LBC
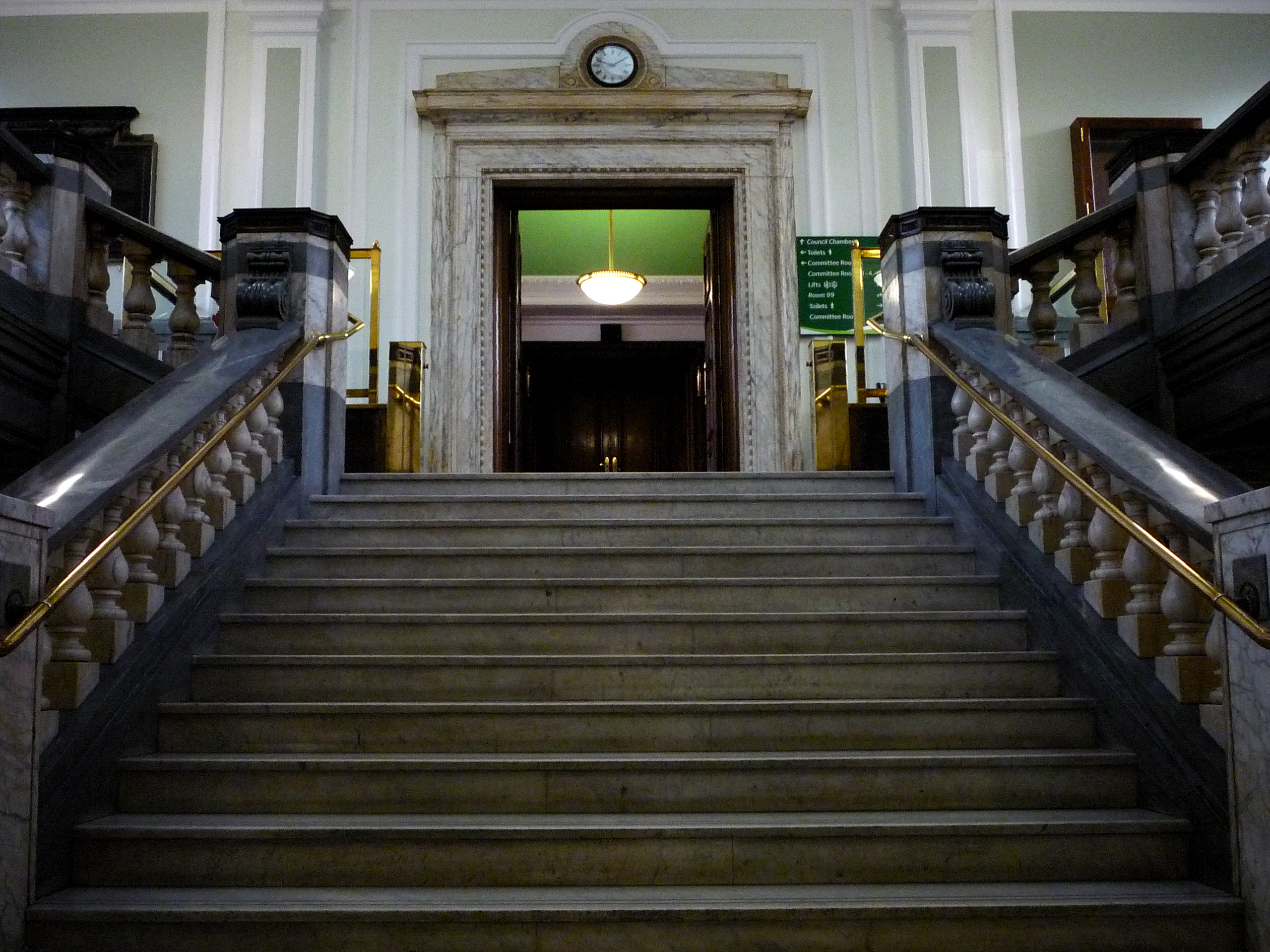
- Entrance hall of Islington Borough Council
- Court: House of Lords
- Full case name: Westdeutsche Landesbank Girozentrale v Islington London Borough Council
- Decided: 22 May 1996
- Citations: [1996] UKHL 12 [1996] AC 669 [1996] 2 WLR 802 [1996] 5 Bank LR 341 [1996] 2 All ER 961
- Transcript: BAILII

Court membership
- Judges sitting: Lord Goff; Lord Browne-Wilkinson; Lord Slynn; Lord Woolf; Lord Lloyd

Laws applied
- This case overturned a previous ruling
- Sinclair v Brougham [1914]

Keywords
- Compound interest, resulting trust, unjust enrichment

Westdeutsche Landesbank Girozentrale v Islington LBC [1996] UKHL 12, [1996] AC 669 (22 May 1996) is a leading English trusts law case concerning the circumstances under which a resulting trust arises. It held that such a trust must be intended, or must be able to be presumed to have been intended. In the view of the majority of the House of Lords, presumed intention to reflect what is conscionable underlies all resulting and constructive trusts.

The decision was arguably the most significant of all of the local authorities swaps litigation cases.

== Facts ==
The Westdeutsche Landesbank Girozentrale sued Islington LBC for the return of £1,145,525, which included compound interest, as money that it had paid under an interest rate swap agreement with the council. Interest rate swap agreements had been declared by the House of Lords, a few years earlier in Hazell v Hammersmith and Fulham LBC, to be ultra vires and void because they exceeded councils' borrowing powers under the Local Government Act 1972. The council accepted that it should repay the money it had received under the void contract, but that it should only repay simple interest. Previously, the courts had only allowed awards of compound interest if the claimant could establish a property right (though this was later reversed in Sempra Metals Ltd v IRC).

Accordingly, Westdeutsche argued that when it paid over the money a resulting trust arose immediately, because the bank plainly did not intend to make a gift. Among the arguments, counsel for the bank submitted that a resulting trust arose on all unjust enrichment claims, which this was, given that the basis for the initial contract had failed. The council contended that on traditional trust law principles there could be no resulting trust (and therefore no property right, and compound interest) because the council's conscience could not be affected when it could not know (before the judgment in Hazell) that the contract was void. A resulting trust needed to be linked to a deemed intention of the parties that money be held on trust, but there was none because the bank had intended the money to pass under a valid swap agreement (even though it did not turn out that way). It followed that compound interest could only begin accruing from the later date of the council's conscience being affected.

On the 18 February 1993, Hobhouse J held at first instance the bank could recover the money because the council had been unjustly enriched at the bank's expense, and could recover compound interest. Hazell v Hammersmith and Fulham LBC was considered and Sinclair v Brougham was applied. On the 17 December 1993, the Court of Appeal, with Dillon LJ, Leggatt LJ and Kennedy LJ, upheld the High Court, with Andrew Burrows acting for Islington LBC, and Jonathan Sumption QC for Westdeutsche. The council appealed.

== Judgment ==
The House of Lords by a majority (Lord Browne-Wilkinson, Lord Slynn and Lord Lloyd) held that Westdeutsche bank could only recover its money with simple interest because it only had a personal claim for recovery in a common law action of money had and received, but that the bank had no proprietary equitable claim under a resulting trust. There was no resulting trust because it was necessary that the council's conscience had been affected when it received the money, by knowledge that the transaction had been ultra vires and void. Consequently, it was necessary that there would be an "intention" that the money be held on trust, but this was not possible because nobody knew that the transaction would turn out to be void until the House of Lords' decision in Hazell v Hammersmith and Fulham LBC in 1991. In his Lordship's view all resulting trusts (even those described by Megarry J as "automatic" in Re Vandervell's Trusts (No 2)) depended on intention and were not connected with the law of unjust enrichment. It followed that no trust arose, and there was only a personal claim for the money back. This meant, said the majority, that only simple interest, and not compound interest was payable (a controversial decision that was overturned in Sempra Metals Ltd v IRC).

The two dissenting judges, Lord Goff and Lord Woolf, also thought that there should be no resulting trust of the money because if a proprietary claim were available, in other cases like this it would have an unfair impact on other creditors of an insolvent debtor, and similarly because it could potentially be unfair if assets could be traced. However, they would have held that compound interest should be available on personal claims. Lord Goff, however, expressly did not enter into a discussion of the points about unjust enrichment that went beyond the scope of the present case. Lord Woolf quoted De Havilland v Bowerbank where Lord Mansfield CJ stated, "that though by the common law, book debts do not of course carry interest, it may be payable in consequence of the usage of particular branches of trade; or of a special agreement". There was no reason why compound interest should not be awarded if it was ordinary commercial practice.

Lord Goff gave his judgment first, agreeing that there was no resulting trust for different reasons, but in dissent arguing that compound interest should be awarded on personal claims.

(2) A proprietary claim in restitution

I have already stated that restitution in these cases can be achieved by means of a personal claim in restitution. The question has however arisen whether the Bank should also have the benefit of an equitable proprietary claim in the form of a resulting trust. The immediate reaction must be - why should it? Take the present case. The parties have entered into commercial transaction. The transaction has, for technical reasons, been held to be void from the beginning. Each party is entitled to recover its money, with the result that the balance must be repaid. But why should the plaintiff Bank be given the additional benefits which flow from a proprietary claim, for example the benefit of achieving priority in the event of the defendant's insolvency? After all, it has entered into a commercial transaction, and so taken the risk of the defendant's insolvency, just like the defendant's other creditors who have contracted with it, not to mention other creditors to whom the defendant may be liable to pay damages in tort.

I feel bound to say that I would not at first sight have thought that an equitable proprietary claim in the form of a trust should be made available to the Bank in the present case, but for two things. The first is the decision of this House in Sinclair v Brougham [1914] AC 398, which appears to provide authority that a resulting trust may indeed arise in a case such as the present. The second is that on the authorities there is an equitable jurisdiction to award the plaintiff compound interest in cases where the defendant is a trustee. It is the combination of those two factors which has provided the foundation for the principal arguments advanced on behalf of the Bank in support of its submission that it was entitled to an award of compound interest.

[... Lord Goff considered points about compound interest, suggesting there was no particular reason why compound interest should not be awarded for personal claims. He then continued on the issue of proprietary restitution...]

In a most interesting and challenging paper published in Equity: Contemporary Legal Developments (1992 ed. Goldstein). Professor Birks has argued for a wider role for the resulting trust in the field of restitution, and specifically for its availability in cases of mistake and failure of consideration. His thesis is avowedly experimental, written to test the temperature or the water. I feel bound to respond that the temperature of the water must be regarded as decidedly cold: see. e.g., Professor Burrows in [1995] RLR 15. and Mr. W.J. Swadling in (1996) 16 Legal Studies 133.

In the first place, as Lord Browne-Wilkinson points out, to impose a resulting trust in such cases is inconsistent with the traditional principles of trust law. For on receipt of the money by the payee it is to be presumed that (as in the present case) the identity of the money is immediately lost by mixing with other assets of the payee, and at that time the payee has no knowledge of the facts giving rise to the failure of consideration. By the time that those facts come to light, and the conscience of the payee may thereby be affected, there will therefore be no identifiable fund to which a trust can attach. But there are other difficulties. First, there is no general rule that the property in money paid under a void contract does not pass to the payee: and it is difficult to escape the conclusion that, as a general rule, the beneficial interest to the money likewise passes to the payee. This must certainly be the case where the consideration for the payment fails after the payment is made, as in cases of frustration or breach of contract: and there appears to be no good reason why the same should not apply in cases where, as in the present case, the contract under which the payment is made is void ab initio and the consideration for the payment therefore fails at the time of payment. It is true that the doctrine of mistake might be invoked where the mistake is fundamental in the orthodox sense of that word. But that is not the position in the present case: moreover the mistake in the present case must be classified as a mistake of law which, as at the law at present stands, creates its own special problems. No doubt that much-criticised doctrine will fall to be reconsidered when an appropriate case occurs: but I cannot think that the present is such a case, since not only has the point not been argued but (as will appear) it is my opinion that there is any event jurisdiction to award compound interest in the present case. For all of these reasons I conclude, in agreement with my noble and learned friend, that there is no basis for holding that a resulting trust arises in cases where money has been paid under a contract which is ultra vires and therefore void ab initio. This conclusion has the effect that all the practical problems which would flow from the imposition of a resulting trust in a case such as the present, in particular the imposition upon the recipient of the normal duties of trustee, do not arise. The dramatic consequences which would occur are detailed by Professor Burrows in his article on 'Swaps and the Friction between Common Law and Equity' in [1995] RLR 15, 27: the duty to account for profits accruing from the trust property; the inability of the payee to rely upon the defence of change of position: the absence of any limitation period: and so on. Professor Burrows even goes so far as to conclude that the action for money had and received would be rendered otiose in such cases, and indeed in all cases where the payer seeks restitution of mistaken payments. However, if no resulting trust arises, it also follows that the payer in a case such as the present cannot achieve priority over the payee's general creditors in the event of his insolvency - a conclusion which appears to me to be just.

For all these reasons I conclude that there is no basis for imposing a resulting trust in the present case, and I therefore reject the Bank's submission that it was here entitled to proceed by way of an equitable proprietary claim. I need only add that, in reaching that conclusion, I do not find it necessary to review the decision of Goulding J. in Chase Manhattan Bank NA v Israel-British Bank (London) Ltd [1981] Ch 105.

Lord Browne-Wilkinson's judgment, agreed with by the majority, followed.

Was there a Trust? The Argument for the Bank in Outline

The Bank submitted that, since the contract was void, title did not pass at the date of payment either at law or in equity. The legal title of the Bank was extinguished as soon as the money was paid into the mixed account, whereupon the legal title became vested in the local authority. But, it was argued, this did not affect the equitable interest, which remained vested in the Bank ("the retention of title point"). It was submitted that whenever the legal interest in property is vested in one person and the equitable interest in another, the owner of the legal interest holds it on trust for the owner of the equitable title: "the separation of the legal from the equitable interest necessarily imports a trust." For this latter proposition ("the separation of title point") the Bank, of course, relies on Sinclair v Brougham [1914] AC 598 and Chase Manhattan Bank [1981] Ch 105.

The generality of these submissions was narrowed by submitting that the trust which arose in this case was a resulting trust "not of an active character": see per Viscount Haldane L.C. in Sinclair v Brougham, at p. 421. This submission was reinforced, after completion of the oral argument, by sending to your Lordships Professor Peter Birks' paper 'Restitution and Resulting Trusts," Goldstein, Equity: Contemporary Legal Developments (1992). p. 335. Unfortunately your Lordships have not had the advantage of any submissions from the local authority on this paper, but an article by William Swadling "A new role for resulting trusts?" 16 Legal Studies 133 puts forward counter arguments which I have found persuasive.

It is to be noted that the Bank did not found any argument on the basis that the local authority was liable to repay either as a constructive trustee or under the in personal liability of the wrongful recipient of the estate of a deceased person established by In re Diplock [1948] Ch. 465. I therefore do not further consider those points.

The Breadth of the Submission

Although the actual question in issue on the appeal is a narrow one, on the arguments presented it is necessary to consider fundamental principles of trust law. Does the recipient of money under a contract subsequently found to be void for mistake or as being ultra vires hold the monies received on trust even where he had no knowledge at any relevant time that the contract was void? If he does hold on trust, such trust must arise at the date of receipt or, at the latest, at the date the legal title of the payer is extinguished by mixing monies in a bank account: in the present case it does not matter at which of those dates the legal title was extinguished. If there is a trust two consequences follow:

(a) the recipient will be personally liable, regardless of fault, for any subsequent payment away of the monies to third parties even though, at the date of such payment, the "trustee" was still ignorant of the existence of any trust: see Burrows 'Swaps and the Friction between Common Law and Equity' [1995] RLR 15;

(b) as from the date of the establishment of the trust (i.e. receipt or mixing of the monies by the "trustee") the original payer will have an equitable proprietary interest in the monies so long as they are traceable into whomsoever's hands they come other than a purchaser for value of the legal interest without notice.

Therefore, although in the present case the only question directly in issue is the personal liability of the local authority as a trustee, it is not possible to hold the local authority liable without imposing a trust which, in other cases, will create property rights affecting third parties because monies received under a void contract are "trust property."

The Practical Consequences of the Bank's Argument

Before considering the legal merits of the submission, it is important to appreciate the practical consequences which ensue if the Bank's arguments are correct. Those who suggest that a resulting trust should arise in these circumstances accept that the creation of an equitable proprietary interest under the trust can have unfortunate, and adverse, effects if the original recipient of the monies becomes insolvent: the monies, if traceable in the hands of the recipient, are trust monies and not available for the creditors of the recipient. However, the creation of an equitable proprietary interest in monies received under a void contract is capable of having adverse effects quite apart from insolvency. The proprietary interest under the unknown trust will, quite apart from insolvency, be enforceable against any recipient of the property other than the purchaser for value of a legal interest without notice.

Take the following example, T (the transferor) has entered into a commercial contract with Rl (the first recipient). Both parties believe the contract to be valid but it is in fact void. Pursuant to that contract:

(i) T pays £1m. to Rl who pays it into a mixed bank account:

(ii) T transfers 100 shares in X company to Rl. who is registered as a shareholder.

Thereafter Rl deals with the money and shares as follows:

(iii) Rl pays £50,000 out of the mixed account to R2 otherwise than for value; R2 then becomes insolvent, having trade creditors who have paid for goods not delivered at the time of the insolvency.

(iv) Rl charges the shares in X company to R3 by way of equitable security for a loan from R3.

If the Bank's arguments are correct, Rl holds the £lm. on trust for T once the money has become mixed in Rl's bank account. Similarly Rl becomes the legal owner of the shares in X company as from the date of his registration as a shareholder but holds such shares on a resulting trust for T. T therefore has an equitable proprietary interest in the monies in the mixed account and in the shares.

T's equitable interest will enjoy absolute priority as against the creditors in the insolvency of R2 (who was not a purchaser for value) provided that the £50,000 can be traced in the assets of R2 at the date of its insolvency. Moreover, if the separation of title argument is correct, since the equitable interest is in T and the legal interest is vested in R2, R2 also holds as trustee for T. In tracing the £50,000 in the bank account of R2, R2 as trustee will be treated as having drawn out "his own" monies first, thereby benefitting T at the expense of the secured and unsecured creditors of R2. Therefore in practice one may well reach the position where the monies in the bank account of R2 in reality reflect the price paid by creditors for goods not delivered by R2: yet, under the tracing rules, those monies are to be treated as belonging in equity to T.

So far as the shares in the X company are concerned. T can trace his equitable interest into the shares and will take in priority to R3, whose equitable charge to secure his loan even though granted for value will pro tanto be defeated.

All this will have occurred when no one was aware, or could have been aware, of the supposed trust because no one knew that the contract was void.

I can see no moral or legal justification for giving such priority to the right of T to obtain restitution over third parties who have themselves not been enriched, in any real sense, at T's expense and indeed have had no dealings with T. T paid over his money and transferred the shares under a supposed valid contract. If the contract had been valid, he would have had purely personal rights against Rl. Why should he be better off because the contract is void?

My Lords, wise judges have often warned against the wholesale importation into commercial law of equitable principles inconsistent with the certainty and speed which are essential requirements for the orderly conduct of business affairs: see Barnes v Addy (1874) LR 9 Ch.App. 244. 251, 255; Scandinavian Trading Tanker Co AB v Flota Petrolera Ecuatoriana [1983] 2 AC 694, 703-704. If the Bank's arguments are correct, a businessman who has entered into transactions relating to or dependent upon property rights could find that assets which apparently belong to one person in fact belong to another; that there are "off-balance-sheet" liabilities of which he cannot be aware; that these property rights and liabilities arise from circumstances unknown not only to himself but also to anyone else who has been involved in the transactions. A new area of unmanageable risk will be introduced into commercial dealings. If the due application of equitable principles forced a conclusion leading to these results, your Lordships would be presented with a formidable task in reconciling legal principle with commercial common sense. But in my judgment no such conflict occurs. The resulting trust for which the Bank contends is inconsistent not only with the law as it stands but with any principled development of it.

The Relevant Principles of Trust Law

(i) Equity operates on the conscience of the owner of the legal interest. In the case of a trust, the conscience of the legal owner requires him to carry out the purposes for which the property was vested in him (express or implied trust) or which the law imposes on him by reason of his unconscionable conduct (constructive trust).

(ii) Since the equitable jurisdiction to enforce trusts depends upon the conscience of the holder of the legal interest being affected, he cannot be a trustee of the property if and so long as he is ignorant of the facts alleged to affect his conscience, i.e. until he is aware that he is intended to hold the property for the benefit of others in the case of an express or implied trust, or, in the case of a constructive trust, of the factors which are alleged to affect his conscience.

(iii) In order to establish a trust there must be identifiable trust property. The only apparent exception to this rule is a constructive trust imposed on a person who dishonestly assists in a breach of trust who may come under fiduciary duties even if he does not receive identifiable trust property.

(iv) Once a trust is established, as from the date of its establishment the beneficiary has, in equity, a proprietary interest in the trust property, which proprietary interest will be enforceable in equity against any subsequent holder of the property (whether the original property or substituted property into which it can be traced) other than a purchaser for value of the legal interest without notice.

These propositions are fundamental to the law of trusts and I would have thought uncontroversial. However, proposition (ii) may call for some expansion. There are cases where property has been put into the name of X without X's knowledge but in circumstances where no gift to X was intended. It has been held that such property is recoverable under a resulting trust: Birch v Blagrave (1755) Amb. 264: Childers v Childers (1875) 1 De G&J 482: In re Vinogradoff [1935] WN 68: In re Muller [1953] NZLR 879. These cases are explicable on the ground that, by the time action was brought. X or his successors in title have become aware of the facts which gave rise to a resulting trust: his conscience was affected as from the time of such discovery and thereafter he held on a resulting trust under which the property was recovered from him. There is, so far as I am aware, no authority which decides that X was a trustee, and therefore accountable for his deeds, at any time before he was aware of the circumstances which gave rise to a resulting trust.

Those basic principles are inconsistent with the case being advanced by the Bank. The latest time at which there was any possibility of identifying the "trust property" was the date on which the monies in the mixed bank account of the local authority ceased to be traceable when the local authority's account went into overdraft in June 1987. At that date, the local authority had no knowledge of the invalidity of the contract but regarded the monies as its own to spend as it thought fit. There was therefore never a time at which both (a) there was defined trust property and (b) the conscience of the local authority in relation to such defined trust property was affected. The basic requirements of a trust were never satisfied.

I turn then to consider the Bank's arguments in detail. They were based primarily on principle rather than on authority. I will deal first with the Bank's argument from principle and then turn to the main authorities relied upon by the Bank. Sinclair v Brougham and Chase Manhattan Bank.

The Retention of Title Point

It is said that, since the Bank only intended to part with its beneficial ownership of the monies in performance of a valid contract, neither the legal nor the equitable title passed to the local authority at the date of payment. The legal title vested in the local authority by operation of law when the monies became mixed in the bank account but, it is said, the Bank "retained" its equitable title.

I think this argument is fallacious. A person solely entitled to the full beneficial ownership of money or property, both at law and in equity, does not enjoy an equitable interest in that property. The legal title carries with it all rights. Unless and until there is a separation of the legal and equitable estates, there is no separate equitable title. Therefore to talk about the Bank "retaining" its equitable interest is meaningless. The only question is whether the circumstances under which the money was paid were such as, in equity, to impose a trust on the local authority. If so, an equitable interest arose for the first time under that trust.

This proposition is supported by In re Cook [1948] Ch. 212; Vandervell v IRC [1967] 2 A.C. 291, 311g, per Lord Upjohn, and 317F, per Lord Donovan; Commissioner of Stamp Duties (Queensland) v Livingston [1965] A.C. 694, 712B-E; Underhill and Hayton, Law of Trusts and Trustees, 15th ed. (1995), p. 866.

The Separation of Title Point

The Bank's submission, at its widest, is that if the legal title is in A but the equitable interest in B. A holds as trustee for B.

Again I think this argument is fallacious. There are many cases where B enjoys rights which, in equity, are enforceable against the legal owner, A. without A being a trustee, e.g. an equitable right to redeem a mortgage, equitable easements, restrictive covenants, the right to rectification, an insurer's right by subrogation to receive damages subsequently recovered by the assured: Lord Napier and Ettrick v Hunter [1993] A.C. 713. Even in cases where the whole beneficial interest is vested in B and the bare legal interest is in A. A is not necessarily a trustee, e.g. where title to land is acquired by estoppel as against the legal owner: a mortgagee who has fully discharged his indebtedness enforces his right to recover the mortgaged property in a redemption action, not an action for breach of trust.

The Bank contended that where, under a pre-existing trust, B is entitled in an equitable interest in trust property, if the trust property comes into the hands of a third party. X (not being a purchaser for value of the legal interest without notice). B is entitled to enforce his equitable interest against the property in the hands of X because X is a trustee for B. In my view the third party, X, is not necessarily a trustee for B: B's equitable right is enforceable against the property in just the same way as any other specifically enforceable equitable right can be enforced against a third party. Even if the third party, X, is not aware that what he has received is trust property B is entitled to assert his title in that property. If X has the necessary degree of knowledge, X may himself become a constructive trustee for B on the basis of knowing receipt. But unless he has the requisite degree of knowledge he is not personally liable to account as trustee: In re Diplock [1948] Ch. 465 at page 478: In re Montagu's Settlement [1987] Ch. 264. Therefore, innocent receipt of property by X subject to an existing equitable interest does not by itself make X a trustee despite the severance of the legal and equitable titles. Underhill and Hayton, Law of Trusts and Trustees, 15th ed., pp. 569-370, whilst accepting that X is under no personal liability to account unless and until he becomes aware of B's rights, does describe X as being a constructive trustee. This may only be a question of semantics: on either footing, in the present case the local authority could not have become accountable for profits until it knew that the contract was void.

Resulting Trust

This is not a case where the Bank had any equitable interest which pre-dated receipt by the local authority of the upfront payment. Therefore, in order to show that the local authority became a trustee, the Bank must demonstrate circumstances which raised a trust for the first time either at the date on which the local authority received the money or at the date on which payment into the mixed account was made. Counsel for the Bank specifically disavowed any claim based on a constructive trust. This was plainly right because the local authority had no relevant knowledge sufficient to raise a constructive trust at any time before the monies, upon the bank account going into overdraft, became untraceable. Once there ceased to be an identifiable trust fund, the local authority could not become a trustee: In re Goldcorp Exchange Ltd [1995] 1 AC 74. Therefore, as the argument for the Bank recognised, the only possible trust which could be established was a resulting trust arising from the circumstances in which the local authority received the upfront payment.

Under existing law a resulting trust arises in two sets of circumstances:

- Where A makes a voluntary payment to B or pays (wholly or in part) for the purchase of property which is vested either in B alone or in the joint names of A and B. there is a presumption that A did not intend to make a gift to B: the money or property is held on trust for A (if he is the sole provider of the money) or in the case of a joint purchase by A and B in shares proportionate to their contributions. It is important to stress that this is only a presumption, which presumption is easily rebutted either by the counter- presumption of advancement or by direct evidence of A's intention to make an outright transfer: see Underhill and Hayton (supra) p. 317 et seq.; Vandervell v IRC [1967] 2 AC 291 at 312 et seq.; In re Vandervell (No 2) [1974] Ch. 269 at 288 et seq.
- Where A transfers property to B on express trusts, but the trusts declared do not exhaust the whole beneficial interest: ibid. and Barclays Bank v Quistclose Investments Ltd [1970] AC 567.

Both types of resulting trust are traditionally regarded as examples of trusts giving effect to the common intention of the parties. A resulting trust is not imposed by law against the intentions of the trustee (as is a constructive trust) but gives effect to his presumed intention. Megarry J. in In re Vandervell (No 2) suggests that a resulting trust of type (B) does not depend on intention but operates automatically. I am not convinced that this is right. If the settlor has expressly, or by necessary implication, abandoned any beneficial interest in the trust property, there is in my view no resulting trust: the undisposed-of equitable interest vests in the Crown as bona vacantia: see In re West Sussex Constabulary's Widows, Children and Benevolent (1930) Fund Trusts [1971] Ch. 1.

Applying these conventional principles of resulting trust to the present case, the Bank's claim must fail. There was no transfer of money to the local authority on express trusts: therefore a resulting trust of type (B) above could not arise. As to type (A) above, any presumption or resulting trust is rebutted since it is demonstrated that the Bank paid, and the local authority received, the upfront payment with the intention that the monies so paid should become the absolute property of the local authority. It is true that the parties were under a misapprehension that the payment was made in pursuance of a valid contract. But that does not alter the actual intentions of the parties at the date the payment was made or the monies were mixed in the bank account. As the article by William Swadling (supra) demonstrates the presumption of resulting trust is rebutted by evidence of any intention inconsistent with such a trust, not only by evidence of an intention to make a gift.

Professor Birks, whilst accepting that the principles I have stated represent "a very conservative form" of definition of a resulting trust (page 360), argues from restitutionary principles that the definition should be extended so as to cover a perceived gap in the law of "subtractive unjust enrichment" (p. 368) so as to give a plaintiff a proprietary remedy when he has transferred value under a mistake or under a contract the consideration for which wholly fails. He suggests that a resulting trust should arise wherever the money is paid under a mistake (because such mistake vitiates the actual intention) or when money is paid on a condition which is not subsequently satisfied.

As one would expect, the argument is tightly reasoned but I am not persuaded. The search for a perceived need to strengthen the remedies of a plaintiff claiming in restitution involves, to my mind, a distortion of trust principles. First, the argument elides rights in property (which is the only proper subject matter of a trust) into rights in "the value transferred": see p. 361. A trust can only arise where there is defined trust property: it is therefore not consistent with trust principles to say that a person is a trustee of property which cannot be defined. Second, Professor Birks' approach appears to assume (for example in the case of a transfer of value made under a contract the consideration for which subsequently fails) that the recipient will be deemed to have been a trustee from the date of his original receipt of money, i.e. the trust arises at a time when the "trustee" does not, and cannot, know that there is going to be a total failure of consideration. This result is incompatible with the basic premise on which all trust law is built, viz. that the conscience of the trustee is affected. Unless and until the trustee is aware of the factors which give rise to the supposed trust, there is nothing which can affect his conscience. Thus neither in the case of a subsequent failure of consideration nor in the case of a payment under a contract subsequently found to be void for mistake or failure of condition will there be circumstances, at the date of receipt, which can impinge on the conscience of the recipient, thereby making him a trustee. Thirdly, Professor Birks has to impose on his wider view an arbitrary and admittedly unprincipled modification so as to ensure that a resulting trust does not arise when there has only been a failure to perform a contract, as opposed to total failure of consideration: see pp. 356-359 and 362. Such arbitrary exclusion is designed to preserve the rights of creditors in the insolvency of the recipient. The fact that it is necessary to exclude artificially one type of case which would logically fall within the wider concept casts doubt on the validity of the concept.

If adopted, Professor Birks' wider concepts would give rise to all the practical consequences and injustices to which I have referred. I do not think it right to make an unprincipled alteration to the law of property (i.e. the law of trusts) so as to produce in the law of unjust enrichment the injustices to third parties which I have mentioned and the consequential commercial uncertainty which any extension of proprietary interests in personal property is bound to produce.

The Authorities

Three cases were principally relied upon in direct support of the proposition that a resulting trust arises where a payment is made under a void contract.

(A) Sinclair v Brougham [1914] AC 398

The case concerned the distribution of the assets of the Birkbeck Building Society, an unincorporated body which was insolvent. The Society had for many years been carrying on business as a bank which, it was held, was ultra vires its objects. The bank had accepted deposits in the course of its ultra vires banking business and it was held that the debts owed to such depositors were themselves void as being ultra vires. In addition to the banking depositors, there were ordinary trade creditors. The Society had two classes of members, the A shareholders who were entitled to repayment of their investment on maturity and the B shareholders whose shares were permanent. By agreement, the claims of the ordinary trade creditors and of the A shareholders had been settled. Therefore the only claimants to the assets of the Society before the Court were the ultra vires depositors and the B shareholders, the latter of which could take no greater interest than the Society itself.

The issues for decision arose on a summons taken out by the liquidator for directions as to how he should distribute the assets in the liquidation. In the judgments, it is not always clear whether this House was laying down general propositions of law or merely giving directions as to the proper mode in which the assets in that liquidation should be distributed. The depositors claimed, first, in quasi contract for money had and received. They claimed secondly, as the result of an argument suggested for the first time in the course of argument in the House of Lords (at p. 404), to trace their deposits into the assets of the Society.

Money had and received

The House of Lords was unanimous in rejecting the claim by the ultra vires depositors to recover in quasi-contract on the basis of monies had and received. In their view, the claim in quasi-contract was based on an implied contract. To imply a contract to repay would be to imply a contract to exactly the same effect as the express ultra vires contract of loan. Any such implied contract would itself be void as being ultra vires.

Subsequent developments in the law of restitution demonstrate that this reasoning is no longer sound. The common law restitutionary claim is based not on implied contract but on unjust enrichment: in the circumstances the law imposes an obligation to repay rather than implying an entirely fictitious agreement to repay: Fibrosa v Fairborn [1943] AC 32, 63-64 per Lord Wright; Pavey & Matthews Pty Ltd v Paul [1987] 69 I.E. 579, 583, 603: Lipkin Gorman v Karpnale Ltd [1991] 2 AC 548, 578C: Woolwich Equitable Building Society v IRC [1993] AC 70. In my judgment, Your Lordships should now unequivocally and finally reject the concept that the claim for monies had and received is based on an implied contract. I would overrule Sinclair v Brougham on this point.

It follows that in Sinclair v Brougham the depositors should have had a personal claim to recover the monies at law based on a total failure or consideration. The failure of consideration was not partial: the depositors had paid over their money in consideration of a promise to repay. That promise was ultra vires and void: therefore the consideration for the payment of the money wholly failed. So in the present swaps case (though the point is not one under appeal) I think the Court of Appeal were right to hold that the swap monies were paid on a consideration that wholly failed. The essence of the swap agreement is that, over the whole term of the agreement, each party thinks he will come out best: the consideration for one party making a payment is an obligation on the other party to make counter-payments over the whole term of the agreement.

If in Sinclair v Brougham the depositors had been held entitled to recover at law, their personal claim would have ranked part passu with other ordinary unsecured creditors, in priority to the members of the Society who could take nothing in the liquidation until all creditors had been paid.

The claim in rem.

The House of Lords held that, the ordinary trade creditors having been paid in full by agreement, the assets remaining were to be divided between the ultra vires depositors and the members of the Society pro rata according to their respective payments to the Society.

[... Lord Browne-Wilkinson continued to analyse the judgment in detail, and continued...]

As has been pointed out frequently over the 80 years since it was decided, Sinclair v Brougham is a bewildering authority: no single ratio decidendi can be detected: all the reasoning is open to serious objection: it was only intended to deal with cases where there were no trade creditors in competition and the reasoning is incapable of application where there are such creditors. In my view the decision as to rights in rem in Sinclair v Brougham should also be overruled. Although the case is one where property rights are involved, such overruling should not in practice disturb long-settled titles. However, Your Lordships should not be taken to be casting any doubt on the principles of tracing as established in In re Diplock.

If Sinclair v Brougham, in both its aspects, is overruled the law can be established in accordance with principle and commercial common sense: a claimant for restitution of monies paid under an ultra vires, and therefore void, contract has a personal action at law to recover the monies paid as on a total failure of consideration; he will not have an equitable proprietary claim which gives him either rights against third parties or priority in an insolvency; nor will he have a personal claim in equity, since the recipient is not a trustee.

(B) Chase Manhattan Bank NA v Israel-British Bank (London) Ltd [1981] Ch. 105

In that case Chase Manhattan, a New York bank, had by mistake paid the same sum twice to the credit of the defendant, a London bank. Shortly thereafter, the defendant bank went into insolvent liquidation. The question was whether Chase Manhattan had a claim in rem against the assets of the defendant bank to recover the second payment.

Goulding J. was asked to assume that the monies paid under a mistake were capable of being traced in the assets of the recipient bank: he was only concerned with the question whether there was a proprietary base on which the tracing remedy could be founded: p. 116b. He held that, where money was paid under a mistake, the receipt of such money without more constituted the recipient a trustee: he said that the payer "retains an equitable property in it and the conscience of [the recipient] is subjected to a fiduciary duty to respect his proprietary right": p. 119d-e.

It will be apparent from what I have already said that I cannot agree with this reasoning. First, it is based on a concept of retaining an equitable property in money where, prior to the payment to the recipient bank, there was no existing equitable interest. Further, I cannot understand how the recipient's "conscience" can be affected at a time when he is not aware of any mistake. Finally, the Judge found that the law of England and that of New York were in substance the same. I find this a surprising conclusion since the New York law of constructive trusts has for a long time been influenced by the concept of a remedial constructive trust, whereas hitherto English law has for the most part only recognised an institutional constructive trust: see Metall & Rohstoff v Donaldson Inc [1990] 1 QB 391, 478-480. In the present context, that distinction is of fundamental importance. Under an institutional constructive trust, the trust arises by operation of law as from the date of the circumstances which give rise to it: the function of the court is merely to declare that such trust has arisen in the past. The consequences that flow from such trust having arisen (including the possibly unfair consequences to third parties who in the interim have received the trust property) are also determined by rules of law, not under a discretion. A remedial constructive trust, as I understand it, is different. It is a judicial remedy giving rise to an enforceable equitable obligation: the extent to which it operates retrospectively to the prejudice of third parties lies in the discretion of the court. Thus for the law of New York to hold that there is a remedial constructive trust where a payment has been made under a void contract gives rise to different consequences from holding that an institutional constructive trust arises in English law.

However, although I do not accept the reasoning of Goulding J., Chase Manhattan may well have been rightly decided. The defendant bank knew of the mistake made by the paying bank within two days of the receipt of the monies: see at p. 115a. The judge treated this fact as irrelevant (p. 114f) but in my judgment it may well provide a proper foundation for the decision. Although the mere receipt of the monies, in ignorance of the mistake, gives rise to no trust, the retention of the monies after the recipient bank learned of the mistake may well have given rise to a constructive trust: see Snell's Equity p. 193: Pettit Equity and the Law of Trusts 7th edn. 168: Metall and Rohstoff v Donaldson Inc [1990] 1 Q.B. 391 at pp. 473-474.

[... Lord Browne-Wilkinson then analysed In re Ames' Settlement [1946] 1 Ch 217 and continued...]

The stolen bag of coins

The argument for a resulting trust was said to be supported by the case of a thief who steals a bag of coins. At law those coins remain traceable only so long as they are kept separate: as soon as they are mixed with other coins or paid into a mixed bank account they cease to be traceable at law. Can it really be the case, it is asked, that in such circumstances the thief cannot be required to disgorge the property which, in equity, represents the stolen coins? Monies can only be traced in equity if there has been at some stage a breach of fiduciary duty, i.e. if either before the theft there was an equitable proprietary interest (e.g. the coins were stolen trust monies) or such interest arises under a resulting trust at the time of the theft or the mixing of the monies. Therefore, it is said, a resulting trust must arise either at the time or the theft or when the monies are subsequently mixed. Unless this is me law, there will be no right to recover the assets representing the stolen monies once the monies have become mixed.

I agree that the stolen monies are traceable in equity. But the proprietary interest which equity is enforcing in such circumstances arises under a constructive, not a resulting, trust. Although it is difficult to find clear authority for the proposition, when property is obtained by fraud equity imposes a constructive trust on the fraudulent recipient: the property is recoverable and traceable in equity. Thus, an infant who has obtained property by fraud is bound in equity to restore it: Stocks v Wilson [1913] 2 KB 235, 244: R Leslie Ltd v Shiell [1914] 3 KB 607. Monies stolen from a bank account can be traced in equity: Bankers Trust Co v Shapira [1980] 1 WLR 1274, 1282c-e. See also McCormick v Grogan LR 4 HL 82, 97.

Restitution and equitable rights

Those concerned with developing the law of restitution are anxious to ensure that, in certain circumstances, the plaintiff should have the right to recover property which he has unjustly lost. For that purpose they have sought to develop the law of resulting trusts so as to give the plaintiff a proprietary interest. For the reasons that I have given in my view such development is not based on sound principle and in the name of unjust enrichment is capable of producing most unjust results. The law of resulting trusts would confer on the plaintiff a right to recover property from, or at the expense of, those who have not been unjustly enriched at his expense at all, e.g. the lender whose debt is secured by a floating charge and all other third parties who have purchased an equitable interest only, albeit in all innocence and for value.

Although the resulting trust is an unsuitable basis for developing proprietary restitutionary remedies, the remedial constructive trust, if introduced into English law, may provide a more satisfactory road forward. The court by way of remedy might impose a constructive trust on a defendant who knowingly retains property of which the plaintiff has been unjustly deprived. Since the remedy can be tailored to the circumstances of the particular case, innocent third parties would not be prejudiced and restitutionary defences, such as change of position, are capable of being given effect. However, whether English law should follow the United States and Canada by adopting the remedial constructive trust will have to be decided in some future case when the point is directly in issue.

The date from which interest is payable

The Court of Appeal held that compound interest was payable by the local authority on the balance for the time being outstanding, such interest to start from the date of the receipt by the local authority of the upfront payment of £2.5m. on 18 June 1987. Although, for the reasons I have given, I do not think the Court should award compound interest in this case. I can see no reason why interest should not start to run as from the date of payment of the upfront payment. I agree with the judgment of Leggatt L.J. in the Court of Appeal (at p. 955) that there is no good ground for departing from the general rule that interest is payable as from the date of the accrual of the cause of action.

Lord Slynn gave a short opinion concurring with Lord Browne-Wilkinson. Lord Woolf concurred with Lord Goff. Lord Lloyd concurred with Lord-Browne-Wilkinson.

== Significance ==
Westdeutsche has on its facts been superseded by Sempra Metals Ltd v Inland Revenue Commissioners, where the House of Lords held that the courts could award compound interest in a restitutionary claim at common law. In Westdeutsche it was conceded that compound interest could not be awarded at common law, and the case was argued to fall within resulting trust principles. However, the bank's claim could now have succeeded without recourse to establishing a resulting trust. In this respect, on what circumstances give rise to a resulting trust, however, Westdeutsche is still the leading case. Note Sempra Metals Ltd has recently been overturned by Prudential Assurance.

However, while remaining the leading case on the circumstances under which a resulting trust will arise, and thus a proprietary remedy is available, Westdeutsche has been subjected to wide-ranging criticism, particularly from academic circles focused on unjust enrichment. This view, represented by Peter Birks and Robert Chambers, suggests that Lord-Browne Wilkinson was wrong to regard resulting trusts as responding to conscience, rather than the absence of any intention to benefit another person. Birks argued that a proprietary remedy need not necessarily follow, although Chambers regards it as possible.

== See also ==
- English trusts law
- Local authorities swaps litigation
