= Restatement of the Law of Agency, Third =

The Restatement of the Law of Agency (3rd edn, 2006) is a set of principles issued by the American Law Institute, intended to clarify the prevailing opinion on how the law of agency stands in 2006.

== Definition of agency ==
According to paragraph 1.01: "Agency is the fiduciary relationship that arises when one person (a 'principal') manifests assent to another person (an 'agent') that the agent shall act on the principal's behalf and subject to the principal's control, and the agent manifests or otherwise consents so to act."

== See also ==
- Restatement of the law
- United States labor law
