= Andrew Burrows, Lord Burrows =

British judge (born 1957)

The Right Honourable Lord Burrows FBA
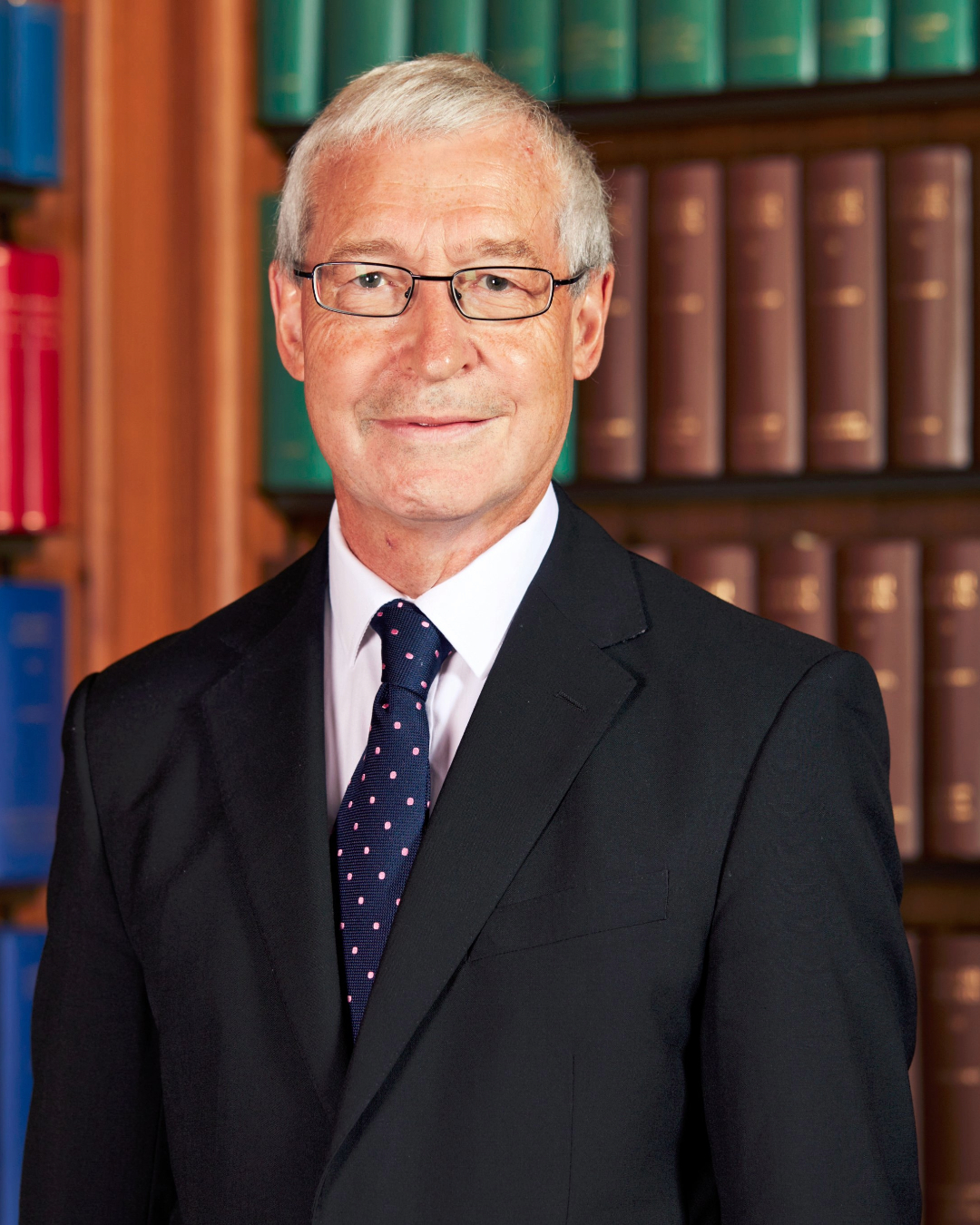

Justice of the Supreme Court of the United Kingdom
- Incumbent
- Assumed office 2 June 2020
- Nominated by: David Gauke
- Appointed by: Elizabeth II
- Preceded by: Lord Wilson of Culworth

Personal details
- Born: 17 April 1957 (age 69)
- Education: Prescot Grammar School
- Alma mater: Brasenose College, Oxford (MA, BCL); Harvard University (LLM)

Andrew Stephen Burrows, Lord Burrows, PC, FBA (born 17 April 1957) is a Justice of the Supreme Court of the United Kingdom. His academic work centres on private law. He is the main editor of the compendium English Private Law and the convenor of the advisory group that produced A Restatement of the English Law of Unjust Enrichment as well as textbooks on English contract law. He was appointed to the Supreme Court of the United Kingdom on 2 June 2020. As Professor of the Law of England, University of Oxford and senior research fellow at All Souls College, Oxford at the time of his appointment, he was the first Supreme Court judge to be appointed directly from academia.

== Career ==
Burrows was educated at Prescot Grammar School and Brasenose College, Oxford, where he received his BA (First Class, Martin Wronker Prize for the best result in Law Finals 1978), which was later promoted to MA, and subsequently took the BCL (First Class). He then studied for an LLM degree at Harvard University. He was a lecturer at the University of Manchester from 1980 to 1986, a fellow and lecturer at Lady Margaret Hall, Oxford from 1986 to 1994, a visiting professor at Bond University and research fellow at ANU in 1994, and a Law Commissioner for England and Wales from 1994 to 1999. His work as a Law Commissioner included co-authorship of the Law Commission's Report No. 242 (Privity of Contract: Contracts for the Benefit of Third Parties), published in 1996 under the chairmanship of Lady Arden of Heswall (then The Honourable Mrs Justice Arden, DBE). This led to the Contracts (Rights of Third Parties) Act 1999, which significantly reformed the law of contract in England & Wales and Northern Ireland by providing for a statutory exception to the common law doctrines of privity and (indirectly) consideration. He was then appointed as the Norton Rose Professor of Commercial Law at St Hugh's College, Oxford.

In 2007 he was appointed as a Deputy High Court judge, sitting part-time in the Commercial Court, having previously sat part-time as a Recorder in both criminal and civil cases. He was elected a Fellow of the British Academy in 2007. In 2010, he was appointed a Senior Research Fellow at All Souls College, Oxford and Professor of the Law of England, University of Oxford, which he remained until his appointment in 2020 to the Supreme Court. From 2015 to 2016, he was President of The Society of Legal Scholars. In 2015 he was elected as an Honorary Fellow of Brasenose College. In private practice, Burrows was a door tenant of Fountain Court Chambers, London. He has appeared in a number of court cases, and was appointed an honorary QC in 2003.

Burrows' work as an academic has proved particularly popular amongst judges, with Baroness Hale of Richmond, then President of the Supreme Court of the United Kingdom, having commented that "there are few, if any, legal scholars whose writings are more frequently cited in our courts".

Burrows took up appointment as a Justice of the Supreme Court of the United Kingdom on 2 June 2020, taking the judicial courtesy title of Lord Burrows. He is the second Justice (after Lord Sumption) to have been appointed without first having served as a full-time judge, and the first Justice to have been appointed directly from academia.

== Notable cases ==
=== As counsel ===
- Westdeutsche Landesbank Girozentrale v Islington LBC [1994] 1 W.L.R. 938 (in the CA)
- Baird Textile Holdings Ltd v Marks & Spencer plc [2001] EWCA Civ 274 (in the CA)
- Test Claimants in the Franked Investment Income Group Litigation v IRC [2012] UKSC 19
- Prudential Assurance Company Ltd v Commissioners for HMRC [2018] UKSC 39

=== As judge ===
- Manchester Building Society v Grant Thornton UK LLP [2021] UKSC 20
- Khan v Meadows [2021] UKSC 21
- Pakistan International Airline Corporation v Times Travel (UK) Ltd [2021] UKSC 40
- R (on the application of Majera (formerly SM (Rwanda)) (AP) v Secretary of State for the Home Department [2021] UKSC 46
- Paul v Royal Wolverhampton NHS Trust [2024] UKSC 1

== Publications ==
- A Restatement of the English Law of Unjust Enrichment (OUP 2012)
- English Private Law
- Cases and Materials on Contract Law (3rd edn Hart 2010)
- The Law of Restitution (OUP 2011)
- Anson's Law of Contract (OUP 2010) (with Jack Beatson and John Cartwright)
- Cases and Materials on the Law of Restitution (OUP 2006) (with Ewan McKendrick and James Edelman)
- Remedies for Torts and Breach of Contract (Clarendon 2004)
- Privity of Contract: Contracts for the Benefit of Third Parties (Law Commission Report No. 242, 1996) (as Law Commissioner)
