= Door tenant =

A door tenant is a barrister who has been granted permission to join a set of chambers and work with them from premises outside the chambers themselves.

Barristers are entitled to have their names written on the door of the chambers of which they are a member. If they practise from those chambers, they are called full tenants. Some barristers do not practise in chambers and have their offices elsewhere, often in another country. They do not have rooms in chambers but their names appear on the door of the chambers. These barristers are called door tenants to differentiate them from barristers who hold rooms in chambers. Frequently, the door tenants will have formerly been full tenants of the chambers in question.
