= Change of position =

Defense of unjust enrichment

Change of position is a defence to a claim in unjust enrichment which operates to reduce a defendant's liability to the extent to which his or her circumstances have changed as a consequence of an enrichment.

== History ==
The historical core of the law of unjust enrichment consists of the quasi-contractual actions of money had and received, money paid to the defendant's use, quantum meruit and quantum valebat. These personal common law actions generated an obligation on the part of the defendant to give restitution of a gain acquired at the expense of the plaintiff. This liability was strict and independent of any wrongdoing on the part of the recipient. Change of position provides a defence to a defendant where it would be inequitable to compel him or her to make restitution. The defence was recognised as part of the English law of unjust enrichment by Lord Goff in Lipkin Gorman v Karpnale Ltd [1991] 2 AC 548.

== Cases & Materials ==
- Ministry of Health v Simpson [1951] AC 251, affirming Re Diplock [1948] Ch 465
- Lipkin Gorman v Karpnale Ltd [1991] 2 AC 548
- Charles Mitchell, 'Change of Position: the developing law' [2005] LMCLQ 168
- Graham Virgo, Principles of the Law of Restitution (3rd ed, 2015)
- Andrew Burrows, The Law of Restitution (3rd ed, 2011)
- Andrew Burrows, James Edelman and Ewan McKendrick, Cases and Materials on the Law of Restitution (2nd ed, 2007) at 762-804
