= Andrew Smith (judge) =

Sir Andrew Charles Smith (born 31 December 1947) is a judge of the High Court of England and Wales.

== Legal career ==
Smith was called to the bar at Middle Temple in 1974 and made a bencher in 1999. In 1990, he became a Queen's Counsel. On 19 July 2000, Smith was appointed a High Court judge, receiving the customary knighthood, and was assigned to the Queen's Bench Division. He served as presiding judge for the North Eastern Circuit from 2003 to 2006 and as judge in charge of Commercial Court from 2008 to 2009.
