= Peter Webster (judge) =

Sir Peter Webster

Justice of the High Court
- In office 1980–1992

Personal details
- Born: Peter Edlin Webster; Walsall, Staffordshire, England

Sir Peter Edlin Webster (16 February 1924 – 10 April 2009) was a British barrister and High Court judge.

Born in Walsall, he attended Oakley Hall in Cirencester, and then the Haileybury and Imperial Service College. In 1943, at the height of World War II, he joined the Fleet Air Arm, and became a pilot, "flying Corsairs from aircraft carriers in the Indian Ocean".

After the war, he entered Merton College, Oxford, in 1946, where he studied law. After a stint working for the Imperial Tobacco Company, he returned to Oxford to teach law.

Webster was appointed to the bench in 1980, and chaired the Judicial Studies Board from 1980 to 1983. He retired from the bench in 1992, thereafter becoming a mediator.
