= List of University of Oxford people in academic disciplines =

This is a list of people from the University of Oxford in academic disciplines. Many were students at one (or more) of the colleges of the university, and others held fellowships at a college.

This list forms part of a series of lists of people associated with the University of Oxford; for other lists, please see the main article List of University of Oxford people.

== Law ==
- Kenneth Beaumont Chairman International Civil Aviation Organization 1946–57 (President Legal Committee 1954–57)
- James J. Busuttil (Linacre) Director, University of London Postgraduate Laws Programme
- Simon Chesterman (Rhodes Scholarship) Vice-provost at the National University of Singapore (NUS) and dean of NUS Faculty of Law and NUS College
- Sarah Cleveland (Lincoln) Professor of Human and Constitutional Rights at Columbia Law School
- Malcolm Evans (academic lawyer) (Regent's Park) Principal, Regent's Park College
- Allan Leal (Rhodes Scholarship) former Dean of Osgoode Hall Law School
- Phoebe Okowa (Wadham) Member, International Law Commission
- Surya Subedi (Exeter) United Nations Special Rapporteur for human rights in Cambodia

== Theology and the study of religions ==
- Marilyn McCord Adams (Christ Church)
- Henry Airay (St Edmund Hall and The Queen's)
- James Alison (Blackfriars) priest, Order of Preachers 1981-95
- Karen Armstrong (St Anne's)
- John Barton (Oriel) Oriel and Laing Professor, Canon Theologian Winchester Cathl, member of Gen Synod
- Gareth Bennett (New College)
- John Bowker (Worcester) Prof of RS Lancaster 1974-84, Trinity Coll Cambridge 1984-93, Gresham Prof of Divinity 1992-97
- George Granville Bradley (University) Headmaster of Marlborough College 1858-70, Dean of Westminster 1881-1902
- Reginald John Campbell (Christ Church) sometime minister of the City Temple
- Edward Cardwell (Brasenose)
- John Chapman (Christ Church) Abbot of Downside 1929-33
- William Robinson Clark (Hertford)
- William Cole (Corpus Christi)
- Kenneth Cracknell
- Herbert Danby (Keble and Christ Church)
- Douglas Davies
- Andrew Davison (Merton and Christ Church)
- Christopher Dawson (Trinity)
- John Day (Lady Margaret Hall)
- Gregory Dix (Merton and Keble)
- C. H. Dodd
- David L. Edwards (Magdalen and All Souls) Dean of Norwich 1978-83, Provost of Southwark 1983-94
- Robert Ellis (Regent's Park)
- Mark Elvins (Greyfriars)
- Austin Farrer (Balliol, St Edmund Hall, Trinity, and Keble)
- John Fell (Christ Church)
- Paul S. Fiddes (St Peter's and Regent's Park)
- Richard Fiddes
- Richard Finn (Corpus Christi)
- John Foxe (Brasenose and Magdalen)
- Richard Hurrell Froude (Oriel)
- Timothy Gorringe (St Edmund Hall and St John's) St Luke's Professor of Theological Studies University of Exeter 1998-
- Rose Graham (Somerville)
- Renn Dickson Hampden (Oriel, St Mary Hall, and Christ Church) bishop of Hereford 1847-68
- Daphne Hampson
- Tom Harpur
- James Hervey (Lincoln)
- George Hickes (St John's, Lincoln, Magdalen College, Magdalen Hall) dean of Worcester 1683-88, bp of Thetford 1694
- Carole Hillenbrand (Somerville)
- Leonard Hodgson (Hertford, St Edmund Hall, Magdalen, Christ Church) Regius Professor of Divinity 1944-1958
- Humphrey Hody (Wadham)
- Henry Scott Holland (Christ Church)
- S. H. Hooke (Jesus)
- Richard Hooker (Corpus Christi)
- Lawrence Humphrey (Magdalen)
- William Ince (Lincoln, Exeter, Christ Church)
- E. O. James (Exeter)
- David Jasper (St Stephen's House)
- Jerome of Prague
- Jeffrey John (Hertford, St Stephen's, Brasenose, Magdalen) Dean of St Albans 2003-
- John Keble (Corpus Christi, Oriel)
- Fergus Kerr (Blackfriars)
- Andrew Linzey (Blackfriars)
- John Lowe (Christ Church)
- Diarmaid MacCulloch (St Cross)
- John Macquarrie (Christ Church)
- Herbert McCabe (Blackfriars)
- Dan McClellan
- Alister McGrath (Merton, Wycliffe Hall, and Harris Manchester)
- Adam Marsh (Greyfriars)
- Geoffrey of Monmouth
- Max Müller (Christ Church and All Souls)
- Oliver O'Donovan (Christ Church and Wycliffe Hall)
- J. I. Packer (Corpus Christi and Wycliffe Hall)
- Peter Payne (St Edmund Hall)
- Robert Payne Smith (Christ Church) Dean of Canterbury 1871-95
- Arthur Peacocke (Exeter, St Peter's and Christ Church)
- Edward Pusey (Christ Church)
- Timothy Radcliffe (Blackfriars)
- William Salesbury
- Jane Shaw (Regent's Park and New College)
- Richard Smyth (Merton, Christ Church, and St Alban Hall)
- Janet Soskice (Somerville)
- Vincent Strudwick (Kellogg)
- Iain Torrance (Oriel) Moderator Gen Assembly Church of Scotland 2003-4, Pres Princeton Theological Seminary 2004-
- John Trevisa (The Queen's)
- William Tyndale (Hertford)
- Richard Ullerston (The Queen's)
- Peter Martyr Vermigli (Regius Professor of Divinity)
- Henry Wace (Brasenose)
- William Wall (The Queen's)
- Henry Wansbrough (St Benet's) Pontifical Biblical Commission 1996-, Prior of Norwich 2004-
- Keith Ward (Linacre and Christ Church)
- William George Ward (Christ Church and Lincoln)
- H. Wheeler Robinson (Mansfield and Regent's Park)
- Vernon White (Oriel and Wycliffe Hall)
- Maurice Wiles (Christ Church)
- William of Alnwick
- William of Ware
- John Williams (Jesus)
- John Wyclif (Balliol)
- Robert Charles Zaehner (Christ Church)

== Historians ==
- Harold Acton (Christ Church)
- J. J. G. Alexander
- Anne Applebaum (St Antony's
- Thomas Arnold (Corpus Christi)
- Timothy Garton Ash (Exeter and St Antony's)
- C.T. Atkinson (Magdalen and Exeter)
- Richard J. C. Atkinson (Magdalen)
- Geoffrey Barraclough (All Souls)
- Max Beloff, Baron Beloff (Corpus Christi, Nuffield, All Souls, and St Antony's)
- Mary Bennett (Somerville and St Hilda's)
- Robert Blake, Baron Blake (Christ Church)
- T. S. R. Boase (Magdalen, Hertford)
- Brian Bond (Worcester)
- Daniel J. Boorstin (Balliol)
- Asa Briggs, Baron Briggs (Nuffield and Worcester)
- Archie Brown (St Antony's)
- Alan Bullock, Lord Bullock of Leafield (New College and St Catherine's)
- Colin Bundy (Merton, St Antony's, Kellogg, and Green)
- Montagu Burrows (All Souls)
- Muriel St. Clare Byrne (Somerville)
- William Camden (Merton, Broadgates Hall, Christ Church)
- Richard Carew (Christ Church)
- Humphrey Carpenter (Keble)
- Sir Raymond Carr (Christ Church, New College, All Souls and St Antony's)
- David G. Chandler (Keble)
- Allan Chapman (Wadham)
- George Clark (Balliol, All Souls, and Oriel)
- R. G. Collingwood (University and Pembroke)
- Alwyn Collinson
- Robert Conquest (Magdalen)
- Gordon A. Craig (Balliol)
- Mandell Creighton (Merton)
- Vincent Cronin (Trinity)
- Foster Cunliffe (New, All Souls)
- Robert Darnton
- Catherine Glyn Davies (Somerville)
- Godfrey Davies (Pembroke)
- Sir Rees Davies (All Souls)
- H. W. C. Davis (Balliol, All Souls, New Coll, Oriel) Ed DNB 1919-28, Prof History Manchester 1921-25, Oxford 1925-28
- R. H. C. Davis (Balliol and Merton) Prof of Medieval History Birmingham University 1970-84
- William Deakin (Christ Church, Wadham, St Antony’s)
- Christopher de Hamel Fellow of Corpus Christi College, Cambridge, his book Meetings with Remarkable Manuscripts won the Duff Cooper Prize for 2016 and the Wolfson History Prize for 2017
- P.G.M. Dickson (Worcester, Nuffield, St. Catherine’s)
- Michael Duffy (Lincoln)
- John Elliott (Oriel)
- Robert Ensor (Balliol and Corpus Christi)
- Richard J. Evans (Jesus and St Antony's) Regius Professor of Modern History and Chairman of the Faculty of History in the University of Cambridge
- Robert Evans (Oriel)
- Cyril Falls (All Souls)
- Keith Feiling (Balliol, Christ Church, and All Souls)
- Niall Ferguson (Magdalen)
- Felipe Fernández-Armesto (St Antony’s)
- Charles Harding Firth (Balliol, Pembroke, and All Souls)
- Herbert Fisher (New College) Member of Parliament 1916-26
- Kathleen Fitzpatrick (Somerville)
- Eric Foner (Oriel)
- Amanda Foreman (Lady Margaret Hall)
- Lady Antonia Fraser (Lady Margaret Hall)
- Sir Lawrence Freedman (Nuffield)
- Edward Augustus Freeman (Trinity)
- James Anthony Froude (Oriel and Exeter)
- Thomas Gaisford (Christ Church)
- V. H. Galbraith (Balliol)
- Henry de Beltgens Gibbins (Wadham)
- N. H. Gibbs (Magdalen, Merton, and All Souls)
- Robert Gildea (Merton, St. Antony’s)
- Lawrence Goldman (St Peter's) Editor, Oxford Dictionary of National Biography 2004-
- Patrick Gordon Walker (Christ Church)
- Rose Graham (Somerville)
- Bernard Green (St Benet's)
- Alice Greenwood (Somerville)
- David Gregory (Christ Church)
- John Habakkuk (All Souls and Jesus)
- Irfan Habib (New College)
- John Rigby Hale (Jesus)
- Henry Hallam (Christ Church)
- Keith Hancock (Balliol and All Souls)
- Clarence H. Haring (New)
- John Hattendorf (Pembroke and St Antony’s)
- Agnes Headlam-Morley (Somerville)
- Peter Heather (New College and Worcester)
- Peter Heylin (St John's)
- Christopher Hibbert (Oriel)
- Christopher Hill (Balliol)
- Carole Hillenbrand (Somerville)
- Geoffrey Holmes (Pembroke)
- George Holmes (All Souls)
- Sir James Holt (Queens, Merton)
- Albert Hourani (Magdalen and St Antony's)
- Michael Howard (Christ Church, Oriel, and All Souls)
- Ronald Hutton (St. John’s, Magdalen)
- Edward Hyde, 1st Earl of Clarendon (Hertford)
- E. F. Jacob (New, Christ Church, All Souls)
- Clay S. Jenkinson (University)
- Henry Kamen
- Roderick Kedward (St Antony's)
- Maurice Keen (Balliol, Queens)
- Elspeth Kennedy (Somerville and St Hilda's)
- Paul Kennedy (St Antony's)
- Walid Khalidi
- Christoph M. Kimmich
- Alan Kreider (Regent's Park)
- John La Nauze
- John Landers (Hertford and All Souls)
- Paul Langford (Hertford and Lincoln)
- Frances Lannon (Lady Margaret Hall)
- Peter L'Estrange (Campion Hall)
- Barbara Levick (St Hugh's and St Hilda's)
- M. D. R. Leys (Somerville)
- Suzannah Lipscomb (Lincoln and Balliol)
- Colin Lucas (Lincoln)
- Roderick MacFarquhar (Keble) Member of Parliament 1974-79
- Piers Mackesy (Oriel, Christ Church, and Pembroke)
- Alan Macfarlane (Worcester)
- John McManners (St Edmund Hall, Christ Church, All Souls)
- Margaret MacMillan (St. Antony's)
- Julia de Lacy Mann (Somerville)
- Margaret Mann Phillips (Somerville)
- J. A. R. Marriott (New, Worcester)
- Robert K. Massie
- John Masterman (Worcester and Christ Church)
- Henry Mayr-Harting (Merton, St Peter's, and Christ Church)
- Mark Mazower
- Josef W. Meri (Wolfson)
- Henry Hart Milman (Brasenose) Dean of St Paul's 1849-68
- Leslie Mitchell (University)
- William Mitford (Queen’s)
- Mary Caroline Moorman (Somerville)
- Samuel Eliot Morison (Christ Church)
- W. L. Morton
- Lewis Namier (Balliol)
- Edward Nares (Christ Church and Merton)
- Avner Offer (Nuffield and All Souls)
- Charles Oman (New College and All Souls)
- Robert O'Neill (All Souls)
- Ilan Pappe (St Antony's)
- G.C. Peden (Brasenose, All Souls, and St. Catherine’s)
- H. R. S. Pocock (Pembroke)
- Frederick York Powell (Christ Church and Oriel)
- Maurice Powicke (Balliol, Merton)
- J. O. Prestwich (Hertford, Queens)
- Michael Prestwich (Christ Church)
- Hastings Rashdall (Hertford, New)
- Gerald Reitlinger (Christ Church)
- Charles Grant Robertson (Hertford, All Souls)
- Jane Robinson (Somerville)
- N.A.M. Rodger (University and All Souls)
- Emma Georgina Rothschild (Somerville)
- J. Horace Round (Balliol)
- A. L. Rowse (Christ Church, Oriel, and All Souls)
- Conrad Russell, 5th Earl Russell (Merton)
- James R. Russell
- Dominic Sandbrook (Balliol)
- Frank Schulman (Manchester)
- Paul Slack (Exeter and Linacre)
- Frederick Smith, 2nd Earl of Birkenhead (Christ Church)
- Goldwin Smith (Magdalen and University)
- R. W. Southern (Balliol, St. John’s, All Souls)
- Lawrence Stone (Christ Church, University, Wadham)
- Hew Strachan (All Souls)
- William Stubbs (Christ Church, Trinity, and Oriel) bishop of Chester 1884-89, bishop of Oxford 1889-1901
- Ernest Swinton (All Souls)
- Oliver Taplin (Magdalen)
- R. H. Tawney (Balliol) president of the Workers Educational Association 1928–44
- A. J. P. Taylor (Oriel)
- Keith Thomas (Balliol, All Souls, St John's, and Corpus Christi)
- Martin Thomas
- Elizabeth Topham Kennan
- Arnold J. Toynbee (Balliol)
- Rick Trainor (Merton, Nuffield, and Exeter)
- Hugh Trevor-Roper, Baron Dacre of Glanton (Christ Church)
- Ann Trindade (Lady Margaret Hall)
- Kenneth Turpin (Oriel)
- Henry Halford Vaughan (Christ Church)
- J. M. Wallace-Hadrill (All Souls)
- Veronica Wedgwood (Lady Margaret Hall)
- R. B. Wernham (Exeter, Worcester)
- Geoffrey Wheatcroft (New College)
- Christopher Wickham (All Souls)
- Spenser Wilkinson (All Souls)
- Basil Williams (New)
- Kate Williams (Somerville)
- A. N. Wilson (New College and St Stephen's House)
- Mary Woodall (Somerville)
- Llewellyn Woodward (Corpus Christi, New, All Souls)
- Blair Worden (Pembroke, St. Edmund’s Hall)
- Lucy Worsley (New College)

== Classicists, Byzantinists and archaeologists ==
- J. L. Ackrill (St. John's)
- Michael Angold
- Polymnia Athanassiadi (Somerville)
- Charles Badham (Wadham)
- Richard Bentley (Wadham)
- John Boardman (Lincoln)
- William Borlase (Exeter)
- Glen Bowersock (Balliol) Professor of Classics and History Harvard University 1969-80, Professor of Ancient History Institute for Advanced Study 1980-2006
- Angus Bowie (Queen's)
- Maurice Bowra (New College and Wadham)
- Peter Brown (New College and All Soul's)
- P. A. Brunt (Oriel and Brasenose)
- William Camden (Magdalen, Christ Church, and the former Broadgates Hall)
- Averil Cameron (Somerville)
- Henry Chadwick (Christ Church)
- Dorothy Charlesworth (Somerville)
- Gillian Clark (Somerville)
- Alison E. Cooley (St. John's)
- Barbara Craig (Somerville)
- G. E. M. de Ste Croix (New College)
- A. M. Dale (Somerville)
- James Davidson
- Kenneth Dover (Balliol)
- Robinson Ellis (Balliol and Trinity)
- Elaine Fantham (Somerville)
- Jill Harries (Somerville)
- W. H. C. Frend (Keble)
- Helen Hughes-Brock (Somerville)
- Sarah C. Humphreys (Somerville)
- Edward Gibbon (Magdalen) Member of Parliament 1774-83
- Jasper Griffin (Balliol)
- Miriam T. Griffin (Somerville)
- Francis J. Haverfield
- Philip Hardie (Corpus Christi)
- Stephen Harrison (Balliol)
- Simon Hornblower (Oriel) Professor of Classics and Grote Professor of Ancient History University College London
- Joan M. Hussey (St Hugh's)
- Benjamin Jowett (Balliol)
- Kathleen Kenyon (Somerville)
- Donna Carol Kurtz (Somerville)
- Francis Leddy (Exeter)
- Irene Lemos (Somerville)
- David Malcolm Lewis (Christ Church)
- Henry Liddell (Christ Church)
- Martin Litchfield West (St John's, University, and All Souls)
- William Walter Merry (Balliol)
- Fergus Millar (Brasenose)
- Margaret C. Miller
- Teresa Morgan (Oriel)
- Gilbert Murray (Christ Church)
- John Julius Norwich (John Julius Cooper, 2nd Viscount Norwich)
- Dimitri Obolensky (formerly Prince Dmitriy Dmitrievich Obolensky) (Christ Church)
- William Mitchell Ramsay (St John's, Exeter, and Lincoln)
- Joyce Reynolds (Somerville)
- P.J. Rhodes (Wadham)
- Nicholas Richardson (Magdalen, Pembroke, Trinity, Merton, and Greyfriars)
- Christina Riggs (Somerville)
- Katherine Routledge (Somerville)
- Erich Segal (Wolfson)
- William Young Sellar (Balliol and Oriel)
- R. R. R. Smith (Lincoln)
- John Sparrow (New College and All Souls)
- William Archibald Spooner (New College)
- Simon Swain (Pembroke, Wolfson)
- Ronald Syme (Oriel, Trinity, Brasenose, and Wolfson)
- Margerie Venables Taylor (Somerville)
- Emily Vermeule (St Agnes)
- J.B. Ward-Perkins (New College)
- Ute Wartenberg
- Katharine Woolley (Somerville)
- Maria Wyke (Somerville)

== Modern languages ==
- Carmen Blacker (Somerville)
- Malcolm Bowie (All Souls)
- George Alfred Kolkhorst (Exeter)
- Joycelynne Loncke (Somerville)
- Malcolm Pasley (Trinity, The Queen's, and Magdalen)
- Rebecca Posner (Somerville)
- T. J. Reed (The Queen's)
- Graham Robb (Exeter)
- Mark Southern (Balliol)
- Enid Starkie (Somerville)
- Joan Turville-Petre (Somerville)
- Ghil'ad Zuckermann (St Hugh's)

== Philosophers ==
- Theodor Adorno (Merton)
- Virgil Aldrich
- Archibald Alison (Balliol)
- Nayef Al-Rodhan (St Antony's)
- Pamela Sue Anderson (Mansfield and Regent's Park)
- G. E. M. Anscombe (St Hugh's)
- Robin Attfield (Christ Church and Regent's Park)
- J. L. Austin (Balliol)
- Anita Avramides (Somerville and St Hilda's)
- Alfred Ayer (Christ Church)
- Roger Bacon (Greyriars)
- Gordon Baker (The Queen's, St John's)
- Jeremy Bentham (The Queen's)
- Isaiah Berlin (Corpus Christi and All Souls)
- Roy Bhaskar (Balliol)
- Brand Blanshard
- Elisabeth Blochmann (Lady Margaret Hall)
- Susanne Bobzien (Somerville, Balliol, The Queen's, and All Souls)
- Thomas Browne (Pembroke)
- John Campbell (Christ Church)
- Quassim Cassam (Keble)
- David Chalmers (Lincoln)
- Gerald Cohen (All Souls)
- R. G. Collingwood (Magdalen)
- Alice Crary (Regent's Park)
- Gregory Currie (St John's)
- Brian Davies (Blackfriars)
- Edward de Bono (Christ Church)
- Daniel Dennett (Hertford)
- John Theophilus Desaguliers (Christ Church and Hart Hall)
- Michael Dummett (Christ Church and All Souls)
- Dorothy Edgington (St Hilda's)
- Gareth Evans (University)
- Antony Flew (St John's)
- Luciano Floridi (St Cross)
- Philippa Foot (Somerville)
- Peter Geach (Balliol)
- Celia Green (Somerville)
- Paul Grice (Corpus Christi)
- Robert Grosseteste (Greyfriars) Bishop of Lincoln 1235-53
- Þorsteinn Gylfason (Magdalen)
- Susan Haack
- Peter Hacker (The Queen's, St Antony's, Balliol, and St John's)
- Stuart Hampshire (Balliol)
- R. M. Hare (Balliol and Corpus Christi)
- Thomas Hobbes (Hertford)
- C. E. M. Joad (Balliol)
- Anthony Kenny (St Benet's, Balliol, St John's)
- Brian Klug (St Benet's)
- Martha Kneale (Somerville)
- Leszek Kołakowski (All Souls)
- Stephen Law (Trinity and The Queen's)
- David Lewis
- Genevieve Lloyd (Somerville)
- John Locke (Christ Church)
- John Lucas (Balliol, Merton)
- Henry Longueville Mansel (St John's and Magdalen) Dean of St Paul's 1868-71
- Colin McGinn (Jesus)
- Mary Midgely (Somerville)
- Michele Moody-Adams (Somerville)
- Max More (Max T. O'Connor) (St Anne's)
- Thomas Nagel (Corpus Christi)
- Kathleen Nott (Somerville)
- Sari Nusseibeh (Christ Church) President of Al-Quds University
- Hilda D. Oakeley (Somerville)
- Michael Oakeshott (Nuffield)
- William of Ockham (Merton)
- Onora O'Neill (Somerville)
- Derek Parfit (Balliol and All Souls)
- Christopher Peacocke (Exeter, The Queen's, All Souls, New College, and Magdalen)
- David Pearce (Brasenose)
- Alexander Piatigorsky
- Jonathan Rée
- Daniel N. Robinson
- W. D. Ross (Balliol and Oriel)
- Alan Ryan (Balliol and New College)
- Gilbert Ryle (Christ Church)
- Julian Savulescu (St Cross)
- John Duns Scotus
- John Rogers Searle (Christ Church)
- Peter Singer (University)
- Aaron Sloman (Balliol and St Antony's)
- Tom Sorell (Balliol)
- Galen Strawson
- Peter Strawson (St John's, University, and Magdalen)
- Ralph Strode (Merton)
- Charles Taylor (Balliol and All Souls)
- Geoffrey Warnock (Hertford)
- Mary Warnock, Baroness Warnock (Lady Margaret Hall and St Hugh's)
- Ronald Lampman Watts (Oriel) Principal of Queen's University (Kingston, Ontario) 1974–84
- Kathy Wilkes (St Hilda's)
- Bernard Williams (Balliol and All Souls)
- Kwasi Wiredu (University)
- A.D. Woozley (The Queen's)

== Economists ==
- William Ashley (Balliol and Lincoln)
- Thomas Balogh, Baron Balogh (Balliol)
- Marian Bell (Hertford)
- David Bensusan-Butt (Nuffield)
- William Beveridge, 1st Baron Beveridge (Balliol)
- Shahid Javed Burki (Christ Church)
- Frances Cairncross (St Anne's and Exeter)
- Wendy Carlin
- Anusha Chari (Balliol)
- G. D. H. Cole (Balliol and University)
- Howard Davies (Merton) Director LSE, formerly Chmn FSA, Dep Gov Bank of England, DG CBI, Controller Audit Commn
- Andrew Dilnot (St John's)
- Francis Ysidro Edgeworth (Balliol)
- Amelia Fletcher
- Andrew Graham (Balliol)
- Roy Harrod (Christ Church)
- John Hicks (Balliol)
- Ursula Kathleen Hicks (Somerville)
- John A. Hobson (Lincoln)
- Harry Hodson (Balliol and All Souls)
- Caroline Hoxby (Magdalen)
- Mary Kaldor (Somerville)
- Lawrence Klein (Lincoln)
- Paul Krugman
- James Meade (Oriel)
- John Williams Mellor
- James Mirrlees (Nuffield)
- Abul Maal Abdul Muhith
- Gunnar Myrdal (Balliol)
- Stephen Nickell (Nuffield) Professor Economics LSE 1998-2006, Member Bank of England Monetary Policy Committee 2000-06
- Paul Ormerod (St Catherine's)
- Utsa Patnaik (Somerville)
- James Robertson (Balliol)
- Walt Whitman Rostow (Balliol)
- Ernst Schumacher
- Amartya Sen (Nuffield and All Souls)
- Faiza Shaheen (St John's)
- Adam Smith (Balliol) known as The Father of Economics or The Father of Capitalism
- Alasdair Smith
- Robert Solow (Balliol)
- Michael Spence (Magdalen)
- Frances Stewart (Somerville)
- Joseph E. Stiglitz (All Souls and St Catherine's)
- Fabian Tassano (New College)
- Lester Thurow (Balliol)
- Barbara Ward (Somerville)
- Richard Werner
- Alison Wolf (Somerville)
- Stefano Zamagni

== Geography ==
- Denis Cosgrove (St Catherine's)
- Andrew Goudie (Hertford and St Cross)
- Emily Georgiana Kemp (Somerville)
- Janelle Knox-Hayes (Green Templeton)
- Diana Liverman (Linacre)
- Halford John Mackinder (Christ Church) Director LSE 1903–08, Member of Parliament 1910–22
- Nick Middleton (St Anne's)
- Ann Varley

== Anthropology and ethnography ==
- Madawi Al-Rasheed (Nuffield)
- Edwin Ardener (St. John's)
- Marius Barbeau (Oriel)
- Brenda Beck (Somerville)
- Beatrice Blackwood (Somerville)
- Maria Czaplicka (Somerville)
- John Davis (University and All Souls)
- Alex de Waal (Nuffield)
- E. E. Evans-Pritchard (Exeter and All Souls)
- Ernest Gellner (Balliol)
- Max Gluckman (Exeter)
- Stuart Hall (Merton)
- Earnest Hooton
- E. O. James (Exeter)
- Schuyler Jones
- Hugh Kawharu (Exeter)
- Robert Ranulph Marett (Exeter)
- James Cowles Prichard (St John's and Trinity)
- Vernon Reynolds (Magdalen)
- Katherine Routledge (Somerville)
- Walter Baldwin Spencer (Exeter and Lincoln)
- Colin Turnbull (Magdalen)
- Mai Yamani (Somerville)

== Sociology ==
- Reem Bassiouney (Somerville)
- John Goldthorpe (Nuffield)
- M. N. Srinivas (All Souls)
- Steven Lukes (Balliol, Nuffield, and Worcester)
- Gordon Marshall (Nuffield) V-C University of Reading, formerly Chief Exec Economic & Social Research Council
- Ted Nelson (Wadham)
- Ann Oakley (Somerville)
- Sheila Rowbotham (St Hilda's)
- Bryan Wilson (All Souls)

== Politics, political philosophy, and international relations ==
- Alyson Bailes (Somerville)
- Mark Bevir
- Christopher Brewin (St John's and Christ Church)
- James Burnham (Balliol)
- Alex Callinicos (Balliol)
- Gerald Cohen (All Souls)
- James Corry Principal of Queen's University (Kingston, Ontario) 1961-68
- Deborah Coyne (Wadham) international relations and law, contributed to Meech Lake Accords
- David Dilks (Hertford, St Antony's, and All Souls) Vice Chancellor of the University of Hull 1991–99
- Samuel Finer (Trinity and Balliol)
- Rosemary Foot (St. Antony's)Professor of International Relations, and John Swire Senior Research Fellow, Oxford Univ
- Bruce Gilley
- Matt Golder Professor at Pennsylvania State University
- Sir Lawrence Freedman
- Nikolas Gvosdev (St Antony's)
- Fred Halliday (The Queen's)
- Ted Hodgetts Principal Victoria College Toronto 1967–69, President Victoria University 1970–72
- Raghavan N. Iyer (Magdalen, Nuffield, and St Antony's)
- Robert Lieber (St Antony's) Professor, Department of Government and School of Foreign Service, Georgetown University
- Frank S. Meyer (Balliol)
- Baisali Mohanty (Wolfson)
- Moses Morgan President of Memorial University of Newfoundland 1973–81
- Thomas Nossiter (Exeter and Nuffield) Professor of Government LSE 1989–94
- Joseph Nye (Exeter)
- Masako Owada (Balliol)
- Rafał Pankowski (born 1976), Polish sociologist and political scientist
- Robert D. Putnam (Balliol)
- Michael Sandel (Balliol) Anne T. and Robert M. Bass Professor of Government, Harvard University
- Emma Sky (Somerville)
- Anne-Marie Slaughter (Worcester) Dean Woodrow Wilson Sch of Public & International Affairs Princeton Univ
- Jeremy Waldron (All Souls)
- Helen Wallace, Baroness Wallace of Saltaire
- Graham Wallas (Corpus Christi)
- Shirley Williams (Somerville)
- Naomi Wolf (New College)

== Asian studies ==
- Carmen Blacker (Somerville)
- Ian Buruma (St Antony's)
- David Hawkes (All Souls)
- James Legge (Corpus Christi)
- Jessica Rawson (Merton)
- William Edward Soothill
- Richard Carnac Temple
- Richard Olaf Winstedt (New College)

== Mathematicians and statisticians ==
- John Macleod Ball
- Simon Bredon (Balliol and Merton)
- Lewis Carroll (Christ Church)
- Mary Cartwright (St Hugh's)
- Kathryn Chaloner (Somerville)
- Anne Cobbe (Somerville)
- Alison Etheridge
- Leslie Fox (Christ Church and Balliol)
- W.S. Gosset (New College)
- Brian Greene
- Edmund Gunter (Christ Church)
- G.H. Hardy (Savilian Chair of Geometry)
- Stephen Hawking (University)
- Peter Hilton (The Queen's) Professor Univ of Birmingham, Cornell Univ, Case Western Reserve Univ, Binghamton Univ, and Univ of Central Florida
- Nigel Hitchin (Jesus, Wolfson, and New College)
- Ioan James (The Queen's and New College)
- Frances Kirwan (Magdalen and Balliol)
- Ruth Lawrence (St Hugh's)
- John Lennox
- Holbrook Mann MacNeille (Balliol)
- Claus Moser, Baron Moser (Nuffield and Wadham)
- Kathleen Ollerenshaw (Somerville)
- Roger Penrose
- Marcus du Sautoy (All Souls and Wadham)
- Caroline Series (Somerville)
- Bernard Silverman (University and St Peter's)
- Henry John Stephen Smith (Balliol)
- G. Spencer-Brown (Christ Church)
- Martin J. Taylor (Pembroke) Professor Pure Mathematics UMIST 1986-2004, Manchester 2004-, Pres London Mathematical Soc 1998-2000, Vice-Pres Royal Soc 2004-
- Richard Taylor (New College)
- Mary Wynne Warner (Somerville)
- J.H.C. Whitehead (Balliol and Magdalen)
- Andrew Wiles (Merton)

== Scientists ==
=== Naturalists, botanists, and zoologists ===
- Joseph Banks (Christ Church)
- Jonathan Borwein (Jesus)
- Sydney Brenner (Exeter)
- Lady Anne Brewis (Somerville)
- Francis Trevelyan Buckland
- William Buckland (Christ Church)
- Neil Chalmers (Magdalen and Wadham)
- Ian Chubb
- Richard Dawkins (Balliol)
- John Bretland Farmer (Magdalen)
- E. B. Ford (Wadham)
- Jeremy Greenwood (St Catherine's)
- J. B. S. Haldane (New College)
- W. D. Hamilton (New College)
- Alister Hardy (Exeter, Merton, and Manchester)
- Ian Hepburn
- John Kidd (Christ Church)
- Linda King
- John Krebs (Pembroke and Jesus)
- Ray Lankester (Christ Church)
- Amory Lovins (Magdalen and Merton)
- Anne McLaren (Lady Margaret Hall)
- Gavin Maxwell (Hertford)
- Robert May, Baron May of Oxford (Merton)
- Peter Medawar (Magdalen)
- Desmond Morris (Magdalen)
- Robert Plot (Magdalen Hall)
- Edward Bagnall Poulton (Jesus)
- David Quammen (Merton)
- Matthew Ridley (Magdalen)
- Charles Sherrington (Magdalen)
- Richard Southwood (Merton)
- Nikolaas Tinbergen (Merton)
- Sunil Kumar Verma (Green)
- Kathy Willis (Merton)

=== Medicine ===
- Donald Acheson (Brasenose and University) Chief Medical Officer 1983–1991
- Henry Wentworth Acland (Christ Church and All Souls)
- Colin Baigent
- Josephine Barnes (Lady Margaret Hall)
- George Wells Beadle (Balliol)
- Claude Bertrand
- Baruch Samuel Blumberg (Balliol)
- Russell Brain, 1st Baron Brain
- Christopher Bulstrode (Green Templeton)
- Robert Burton (Brasenose)
- Sheila Cassidy (Somerville)
- Ernst Chain (University)
- Alan Clemetson
- Augusto Claudio Cuello Professor and Charles E. Frosst/Merck Chair in Pharmacology & Therapeutics, McGill University
- Richard Doll (Christ Church)
- John Carew Eccles (Magdalen)
- J. R. Evans President, University of Toronto, 1972–78, Director Population, Health, & Nutrition, World Bank, 1979–83
- William Feindel (Merton)
- Howard Florey (Lincoln, The Queen's, and Magdalen)
- John Freind (Christ Church)
- Innocent Gangaidzo
- Archibald Garrod (Christ Church)
- Atul Gawande (Balliol)
- Ragnar Granit
- Bongani Mayosi (Wolfson)
- Roy Meadow (Worcester)
- Richard Morton (Magdalen Hall)
- David Naylor (Hertford) President, University of Toronto, 2005–
- Paul Nurse (Linacre)
- Severo Ochoa
- William Osler (Christ Church)
- Wilder Penfield
- Thomas Phaer sometime Member of Parliament for Cardigan
- Rodney Porter (Trinity)
- John Radcliffe (University)
- Oliver Sacks (The Queen's)
- Cicely Saunders (St Anne's)
- Charles Singer (Magdalen)
- Oliver Smithies (Balliol)
- Elsdon Storey
- Thomas Stuttaford (Brasenose) The Times medical expert, Member of Parliament, 1970–74
- Robert Twycross
- John Robert Vane (St Catherine's)
- Arthur Vidrine
- Diana Walford (Mansfield)
- Thomas Willis (Christ Church)

=== Psychologists, psychiatrists, and physiologists of the brain ===
- Simon Baron-Cohen (New College)
- Stephen J. Bergman (Samuel Shem) (Balliol)
- G. E. Berrios (Corpus Christi)
- Wilfred Bion (The Queen's)
- Nick Bouras
- Chris Brand (The Queen's and Nuffield)
- Donald Broadbent (Wolfson)
- Fiona Caldicott (St Hilda's and Somerville)
- Gordon Claridge (Magdalen)
- Hervey M. Cleckley
- Adrian Furnham (Pembroke)
- Jeffrey Alan Gray (Magdalen)
- Susan Adele Greenfield, Baroness Greenfield (St Hilda's and Lincoln)
- Miles Hewstone (New College)
- Charles McCreery (New College and Magdalen)
- Edward Thomas Monro (Oriel)
- Henry Monro (Oriel)
- James Monro (Balliol)
- John Monro (St John's and University)
- Thomas Monro (Oriel)
- Shirley Pearce (St Anne's)
- Adrian Raine
- Edmund Rolls (Corpus Christi)
- Stuart Sutherland (Magdalen)
- Lawrence Weiskrantz (Magdalen)
- Simon Wessely (University)

=== Chemists ===
- Mary Archer, Baroness Archer of Weston-super-Mare (St Anne's)
- Peter Atkins (Lincoln)
- Michael Barber (chemist) (The Queen's)
- Anne Beloff-Chain
- Robert Boyle (University)
- Humphry Bowen (Magdalen)
- E. J. Bowen (Balliol)
- David Clary (St John's and Magdalen)
- John Cornforth (St Catherine's)
- Charles Daubeny (Magdalen)
- Roger Gaudry Rector, Université de Montréal, 1965–75
- Véronique Gouverneur
- Nicole Grobert
- Dalziel Hammick (Magdalen)
- Cyril Norman Hinshelwood (Balliol)
- Dorothy Hodgkin (Somerville)
- Frederick L. Hovde
- Malcolm Kelland, professor of chemistry at University of Stavanger
- Abdus Suttar Khan (St. Catherine's)
- Jeremy Knowles (Balliol and Wadham)
- Ilya Kuprov (Corpus Christi and Magdalen)
- Jack Linnett (The Queen's)
- Michael Mingos (Keble and St Edmund Hall)
- Robert Mulliken (St John's)
- Linus Pauling (Balliol)
- Rex Richards (Lincoln, Exeter, and Merton)
- Robert Robinson (Magdalen)
- Francis Simon (Christ Church)
- James Smithson (Pembroke)
- Frederick Soddy (Merton)
- Alexander Todd (Oriel)
- John E. Walker (St Catherine's)
- Michael Stanley Whittingham
- Ahmed Zewail (St Catherine's)

=== Physicists and astronomers ===
==== Astronomers Royal ====
- Edmund Halley (The Queen's) 1720–42
- James Bradley (Balliol) 1742–62
- Nathaniel Bliss (Pembroke) 1762-64
- Martin Ryle (Christ Church) 1972–82

==== Other physicists and astronomers ====
- John D. Barrow
- Roger Cashmore (Balliol, University, Christ Church, Merton, and Brasenose)
- Albert Einstein (Christ Church)
- Brian Greene
- Stephen Hawking (University)
- Robert Hooke (Christ Church)
- Edwin Hubble (The Queen's)
- Leonard Huxley
- Willis Lamb
- Anthony Leggett
- Frederick Lindemann, 1st Viscount Cherwell (Christ Church)
- John Maddox (Christ Church)
- Brian G. Marsden (New College)
- Roger Penrose
- Stephen Quake (PhD 1994)
- Norman Ramsey (Balliol)
- Erwin Schrödinger (Magdalen)
- Dennis Sciama
- John Hasbrouck van Vleck (Balliol)
- Klaus von Klitzing
- John Clive Ward
- Denys Wilkinson (Christ Church)
- Richard Wilson (Christ Church)
- Stephen Wolfram (St John's)

=== Computers, electronics, and robotics ===
- Samson Abramsky (Wolfson)
- Tim Berners-Lee (The Queen's)
- Richard Bird (Lincoln)
- Jonathan Bowen (University)
- Edgar F. Codd (Exeter)
- David Gavaghan (New College)
- Joseph Goguen (St Anne's)
- Ralph Hartley
- C. A. R. Hoare (Merton)
- Cliff Jones
- Hermann Moisl
- Peter Mosses (Trinity and Wolfson)
- Peter Braam (Merton College and St Catherine's )
- Mike Reed (St Edmund Hall)
- Bill Roscoe (University)
- Martin Smith (St John's)
- Michael Spivey (Oriel)
- Joe Stoy (Balliol)
- Christopher Strachey
- David Turner
- Robert J. Van de Graaff
- Jim Woodcock (Kellogg)

=== Engineering and agriculture ===
- Roger Ainsworth (Jesus and St Catherine's)
- Ben Britton (St Catherine's)
- William Froude (Oriel)
- E. Peter Raynes (St Cross)
- Lionel Tarassenko (Keble and St John's)
- Jethro Tull (St John's)
- Matilda Simon, 3rd Baroness Simon of Wythenshawe (Balliol)
- Kevin Warwick (Somerville)
- Martin Wood (Christ Church)

=== Geology ===
- William Joscelyn Arkell (New College)
- U. Aswathanarayana
- Donald Ferlys Wilson Baden-Powell (Oriel)
- Malcolm Brown (St Cross)
- Colin Campbell (Wadham)
- Keith Cox (The Queen's and Jesus)
- Moira Dunbar (St Anne's)
- Charles Lyell (Exeter)
- Hugh Edwin Strickland (Oriel)
- Lawrence Wager

=== Meteorology ===
- Joanna Haigh (Somerville)
- Patrick McTaggart-Cowan (Corpus Christi)
