= Brewin =

Brewin is a surname of the following people:

- Members of Canada's political family
  - Andrew Brewin (1907–1983), Canadian lawyer and politician
  - Gretchen Brewin (born 1938), Canadian politician and wife of John
  - John Brewin (born 1936), Canadian politician, son of Andrew, and husband of Gretchen
- Arthur Winbolt Brewin (1867–1946), Hong Kong government official
- Beryl Brewin (1910–1999), New Zealand marine zoologist
- Christopher Brewin (1945–2018), British international relations scholar
- Frank Brewin (1909–1976), Indian field hockey player
- Jennifer Brewin, Canadian theatre creator and artistic director
- John A. Brewin (1876–1938), American college sports coach
- Luc Brewin (born 2002), French multi-event athlete
