= List of University of Oxford people in the law =

Lawyers who attended the University of Oxford

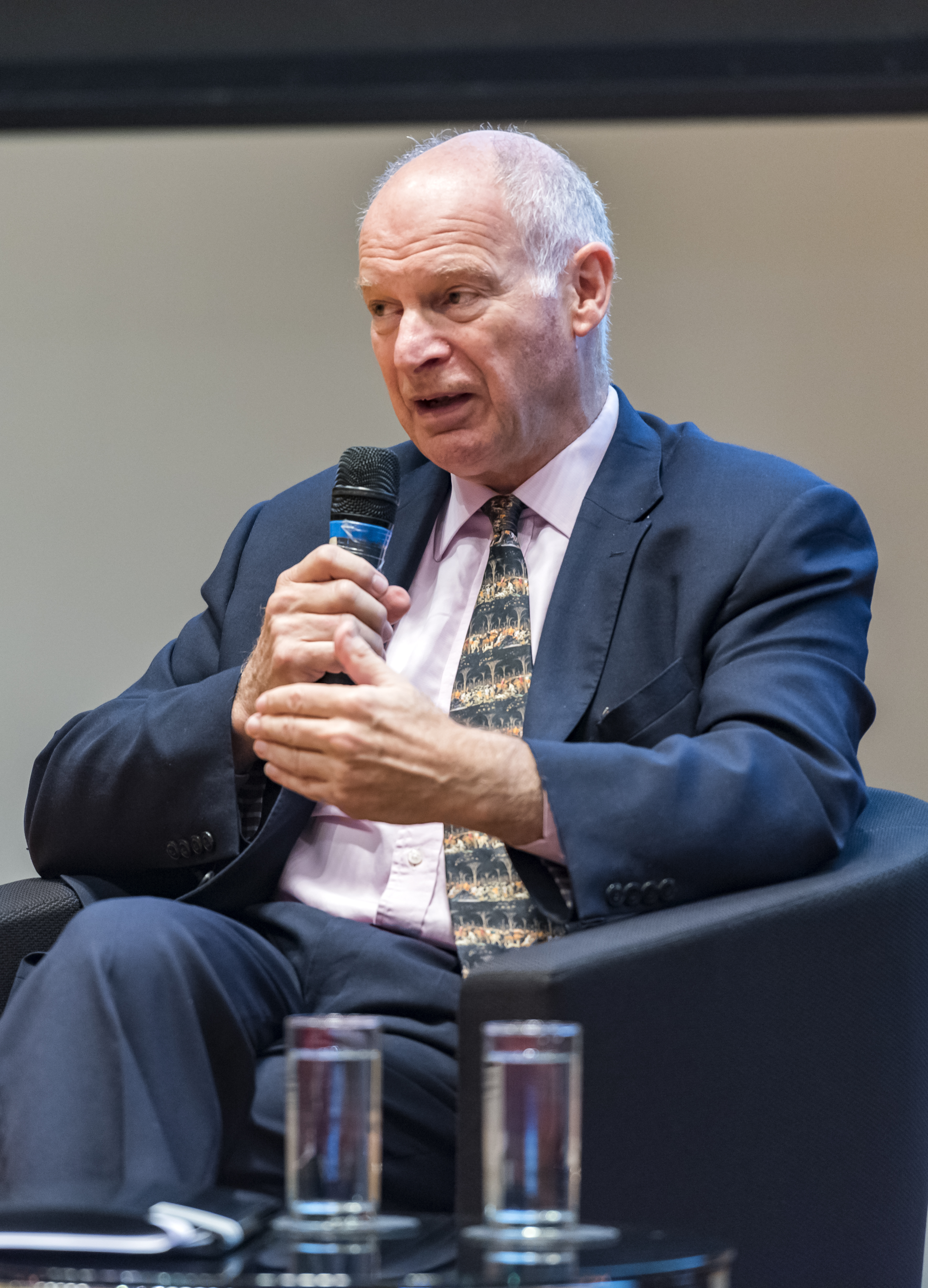
Lord Neuberger of Abbotsbury

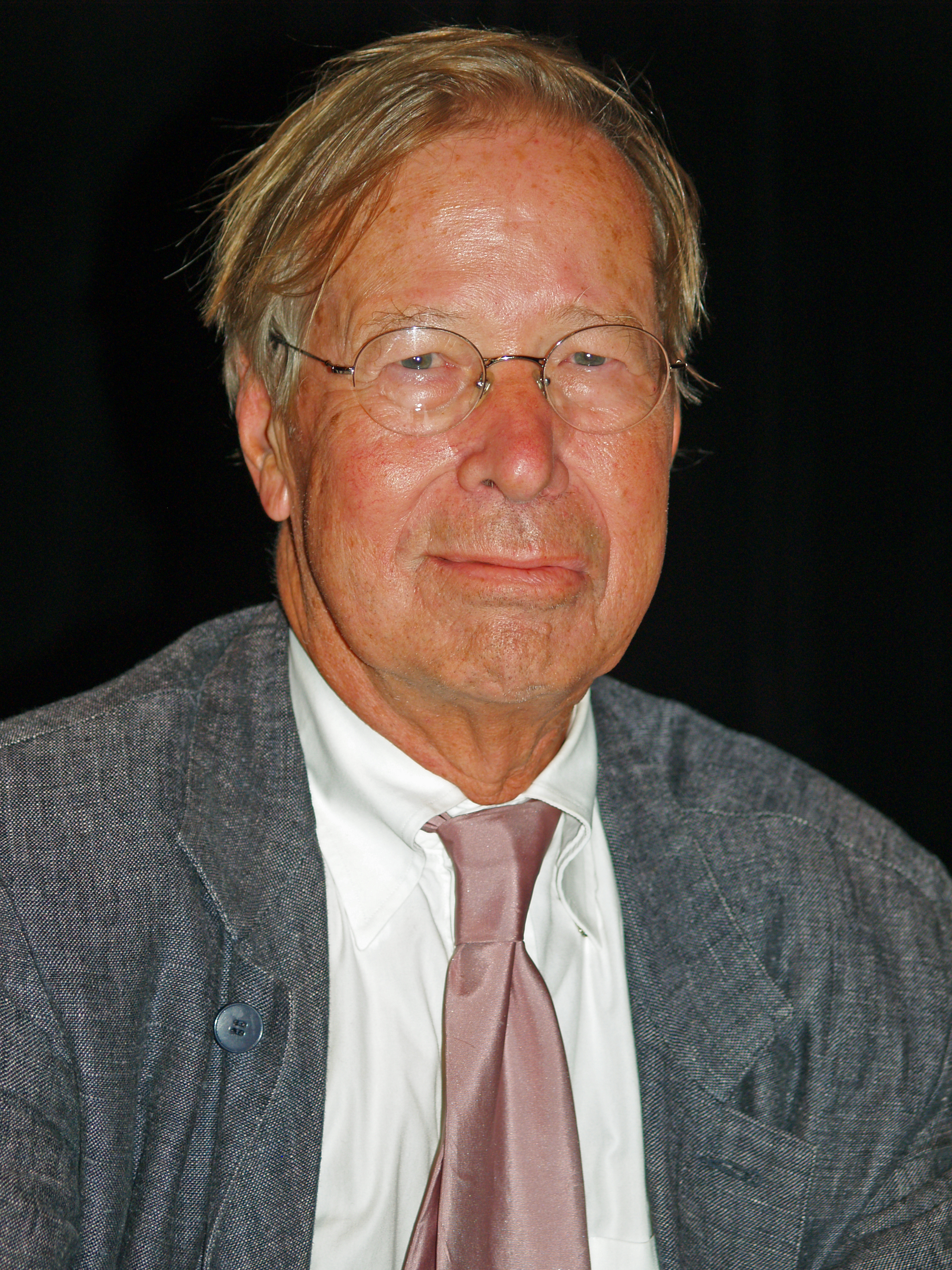
Ronald Dworkin

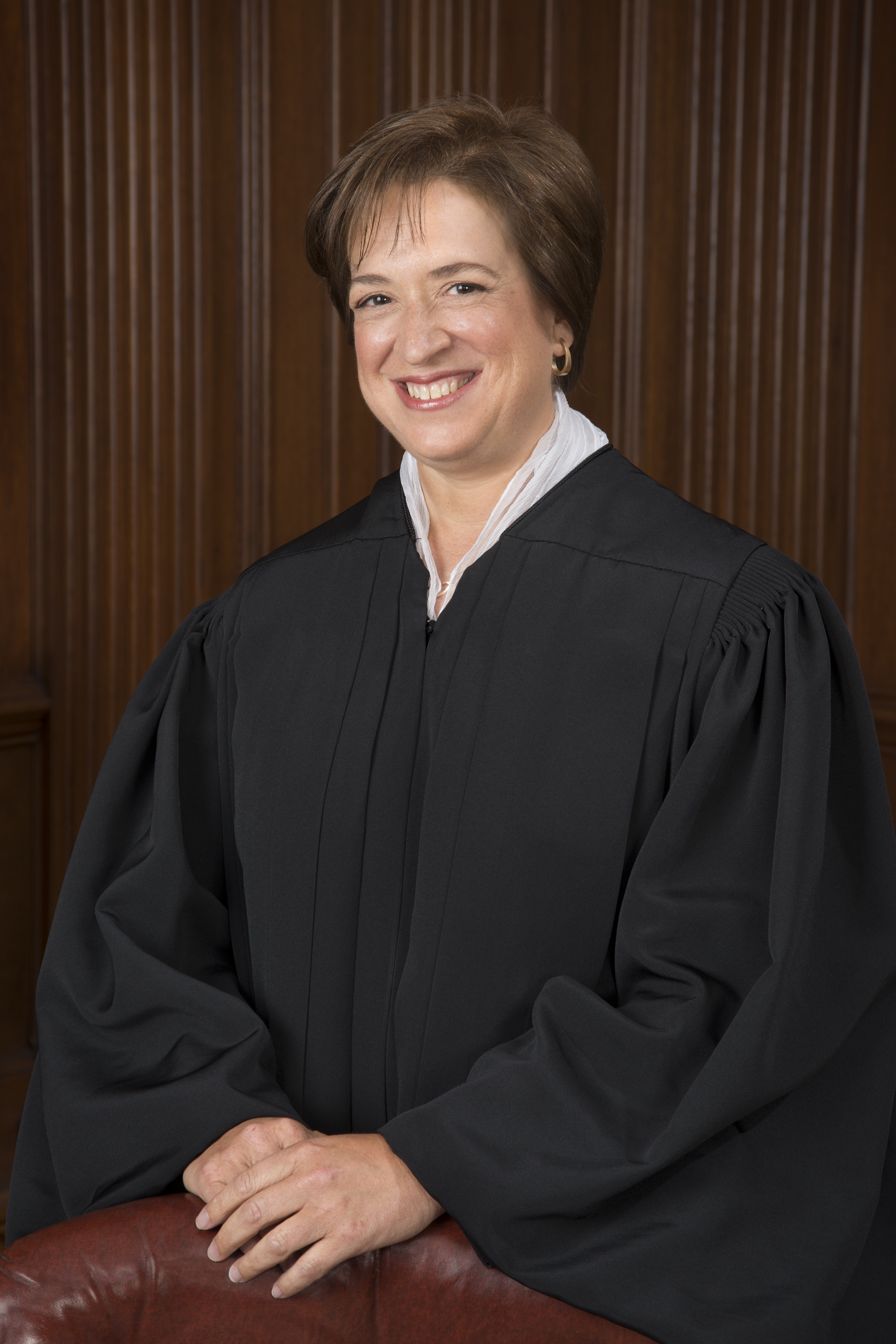
Elena Kagan

This is a list of University of Oxford people in the Law. Many were students at one (or more) of the colleges of the University, and others held fellowships at a college.

This list forms part of a series of lists of people associated with the University of Oxford – for other lists, please see the main article List of University of Oxford people.

Oxford has produced a large number of distinguished jurists, judges and lawyers around the world. This list includes twelve Lord Chancellors, ten Lord Chief Justices, nine UK Supreme Court Justices and twenty-two law lords; four associate justices of the US Supreme Court as well as six puisne justices of the Supreme Court of Canada and a chief justice of the now defunct Federal Court of Canada. The current Lord Chief Justice (the most senior judge in England and Wales), Lord Burnett of Maldon, was educated at Oxford.

== European Court of Human Rights ==
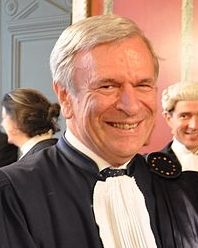
Nicolas Bratza

Name	College	Years at Oxford	Notes	Ref
Nicolas Bratza	Brasenose		High Court Judge 1998–, Judge of the European Court of Human Rights 1998–, Section President ECHR 1998–, Vice-President ECHR 2007–	
Paul Mahoney			Judge of the European Court of Human Rights 2012–16, first President of European Union Civil Service Tribunal (2005–2011)	

== Lord Chancellors and Lord Chief Justices ==
Name	College	Years at Oxford	Notes	Ref
Charles Abbott, 1st Baron Tenterden	Corpus Christi	1781–1784	Lord Chief Justice of the King's Bench 1818–32	
Henry Bathurst, 2nd Earl Bathurst, 1st Baron Apsley	Balliol	1730–	Lord Chancellor 1771–78	
Ian Burnett, Baron Burnett of Maldon	Pembroke		Lord Chief Justice 2017–	
Richard Bethell, 1st Baron Westbury	Wadham	1814–1819	Lord Chancellor 1861–65	
Thomas Bingham, Baron Bingham of Cornhill	Balliol	1954–	Master of the Rolls 1992–1996, Lord Chief Justice 1996–2000, Senior Law Lord 2000–2008	
Stanley Buckmaster, 1st Viscount Buckmaster	Christ Church	1879–1882	Solicitor General 1913–15, Lord Chancellor 1915–16	
John Coleridge, 1st Baron Coleridge	Balliol	1838–1843	Fellow of Exeter College 1843–1846, Chief Justice of the Common Pleas 1873–80, Lord Chief Justice 1880–94	
Gerald Gardiner, Baron Gardiner	Magdalen	–1923	Lord Chancellor 1964–70	
David Gauke	St Edmund Hall	1990–1993	Lord Chancellor 2018–	
Hardinge Giffard, 1st Earl of Halsbury	Merton	1842–1845	Lord Chancellor 1885–86, 1886–92, & 1895–1905	
Rayner Goddard, Baron Goddard	Trinity	–1898	Lord Chief Justice 1946–1958	
Matthew Hale	Magdalen Hall	1626–1629	Lord Chief Baron of the Exchequer 1660–71, Lord Chief Justice 1671–76	
Quintin Hogg, Baron Hailsham of St Marylebone	Christ Church	1927–1931	Prize Fellow of All Souls 1931, Lord Chancellor 1970–74 and 1979–87	
John Holt	Oriel	1658–	Lord Chief Justice 1689–1710	
William Jowitt, 1st Earl Jowitt	New College	1903–1906	Solicitor General 1940–42, Lord Chancellor 1945–51	
Reginald Manningham-Buller, 1st Viscount Dilhorne	Magdalen	–1926	Lord Chancellor 1962–1964	
Thomas More	Oriel or Canterbury	1492–1494	Lord Chancellor 1529–1532	
William Murray, 1st Earl of Mansfield	Christ Church	1723–1727	Lord Chief Justice of the King's Bench 1756–88	
John Popham	Balliol		Speaker of the House of Commons 1580–83, Lord Chief Justice 1592–1607	
Robert Reid, 1st Earl Loreburn	Balliol	–1868	Lord Chancellor 1907–1912	
John Sankey, 1st Viscount Sankey	Jesus	–1891	Lord Chancellor 1929–1935	
William Scroggs	Pembroke	1639–1649	Lord Chief Justice 1678–81	
Gavin Simonds, 1st Viscount Simonds	New College	1900–1904	Lord Chancellor 1951–1954	
Thomas Wolsey	Magdalen College		Lord Chancellor 1515–1529	

== Justices of the Supreme Court of the United Kingdom ==
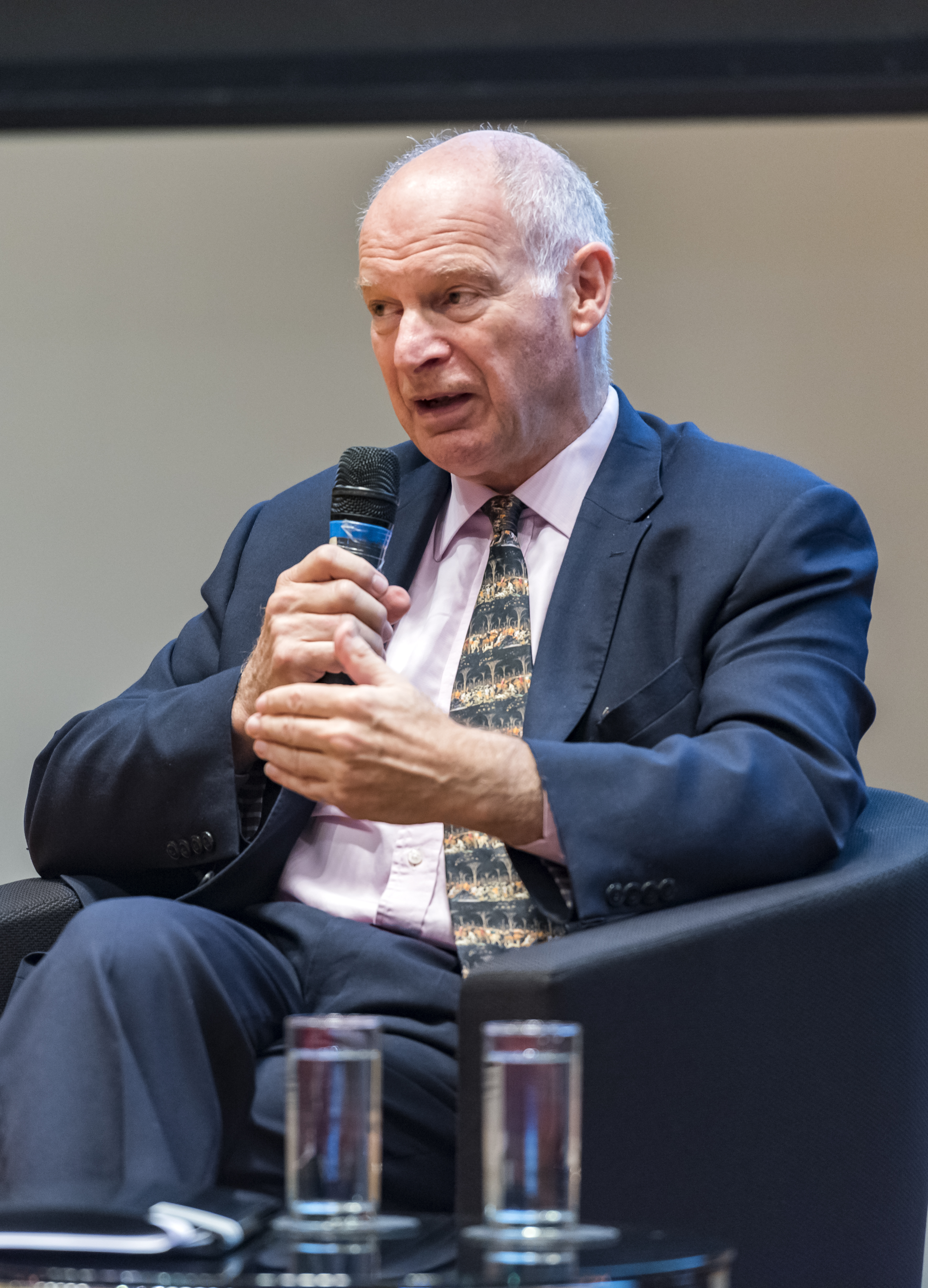
Lord Neuberger of Abbotsbury, President of the Supreme Court of the United Kingdom (2012–2017)

Name	College	Years at Oxford	Notes	Ref
David Neuberger, Baron Neuberger of Abbotsbury	Christ Church	1966–1970, BA (Chemistry)	President of the Supreme Court of the United Kingdom (2012–2017); Master of the Rolls (2009–2012); Lord of Appeal in Ordinary (2007–2009); Lord Justice of Appeal (2004–2007); Justice of the High Court, CD (1996–2004)	
Jonathan Mance, Baron Mance	University	1961–1964, BA (Law)	Justice of the Supreme Court of the United Kingdom (2009–); Lord of Appeal in Ordinary (2005–2009); Lord Justice of Appeal (1999–2005); Justice of the High Court, QBD (1993–1999)	
Nicholas Wilson, Lord Wilson of Culworth	Worcester		Justice of the Supreme Court of the United Kingdom (2011–); Lord Justice of Appeal (2005–2011); Justice of the High Court, FD (1993–2005)	
Jonathan Sumption, Lord Sumption	Magdalen	1967–1970, BA (Medieval History)	Justice of the Supreme Court of the United Kingdom (2012–); Deputy High Court Judge, Judge Jersey & Guernsey Court of Appeal	
Robert Reed, Baron Reed of Allermuir	Balliol	1978, DPhil (Law)	Justice of the Supreme Court of the United Kingdom (2012–); Senator of the College of Justice: Inner House (2008–2012), Outer House (1998–2008)	
Alan Rodger, Baron Rodger of Earlsferry	New and Balliol	1970–1972, DPhil (Law)	Lord President of the Court of Session 1996–2001; appointed a Law Lord in 2001, Justice of the Supreme Court of the United Kingdom (2009–11)	
Mark Saville, Baron Saville of Newdigate	Brasenose College		Justice of the Supreme Court of the United Kingdom (2009–12)	
Michael Briggs, Lord Briggs of Westbourne	Magdalen		Justice of the Supreme Court of the United Kingdom (2017–)	
Simon Brown, Baron Brown of Eaton-under-Heywood	Worcester College		Appointed a Law Lord in 2004, Justice of the Supreme Court of the United Kingdom (2009–12)	
Vivien Rose, Lady Rose of Colmworth	Brasenose College		Justice of the Supreme Court of the United Kingdom (2021–); Lady Justice of Appeal (2019–2021); Justice of the High Court, Chancery Division (2013–2019)	
Andrew Burrows, Lord Burrows	Brasenose College		Justice of the Supreme Court of the United Kingdom (2020–); Deputy High Court judge (England and Wales) (part-time), Commercial Division (2007–2020); Recorder, Crown Court South-Eastern Circuit (approx. 2000–2017)	

== Lords of Appeal in Ordinary (Law Lords) ==
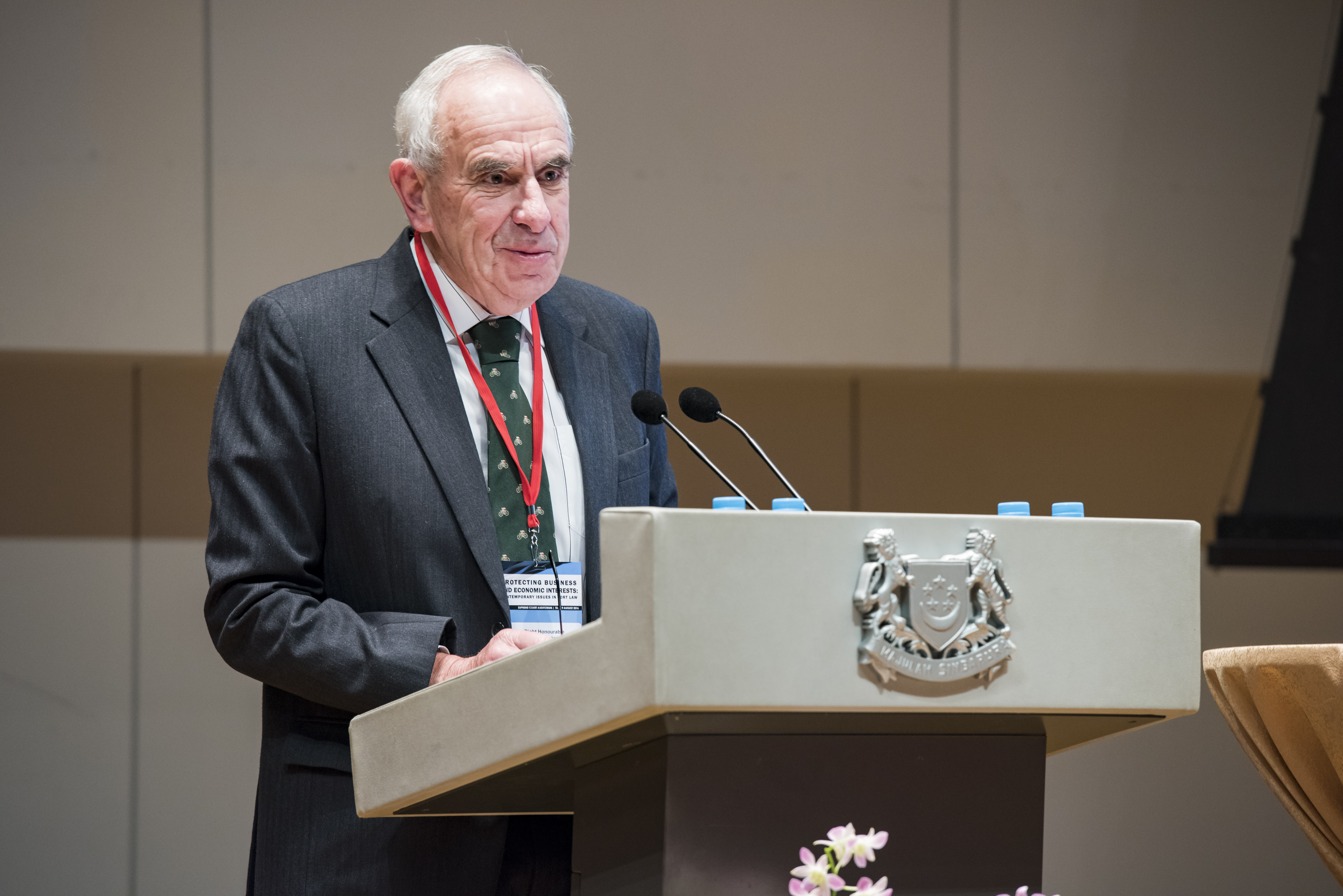
Lord Hoffmann

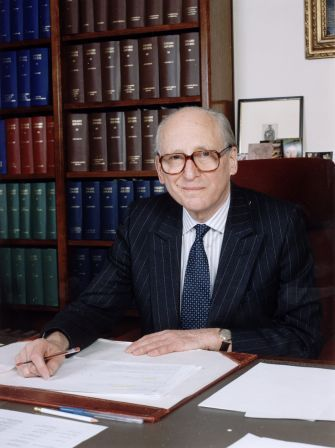
Lord Bingham

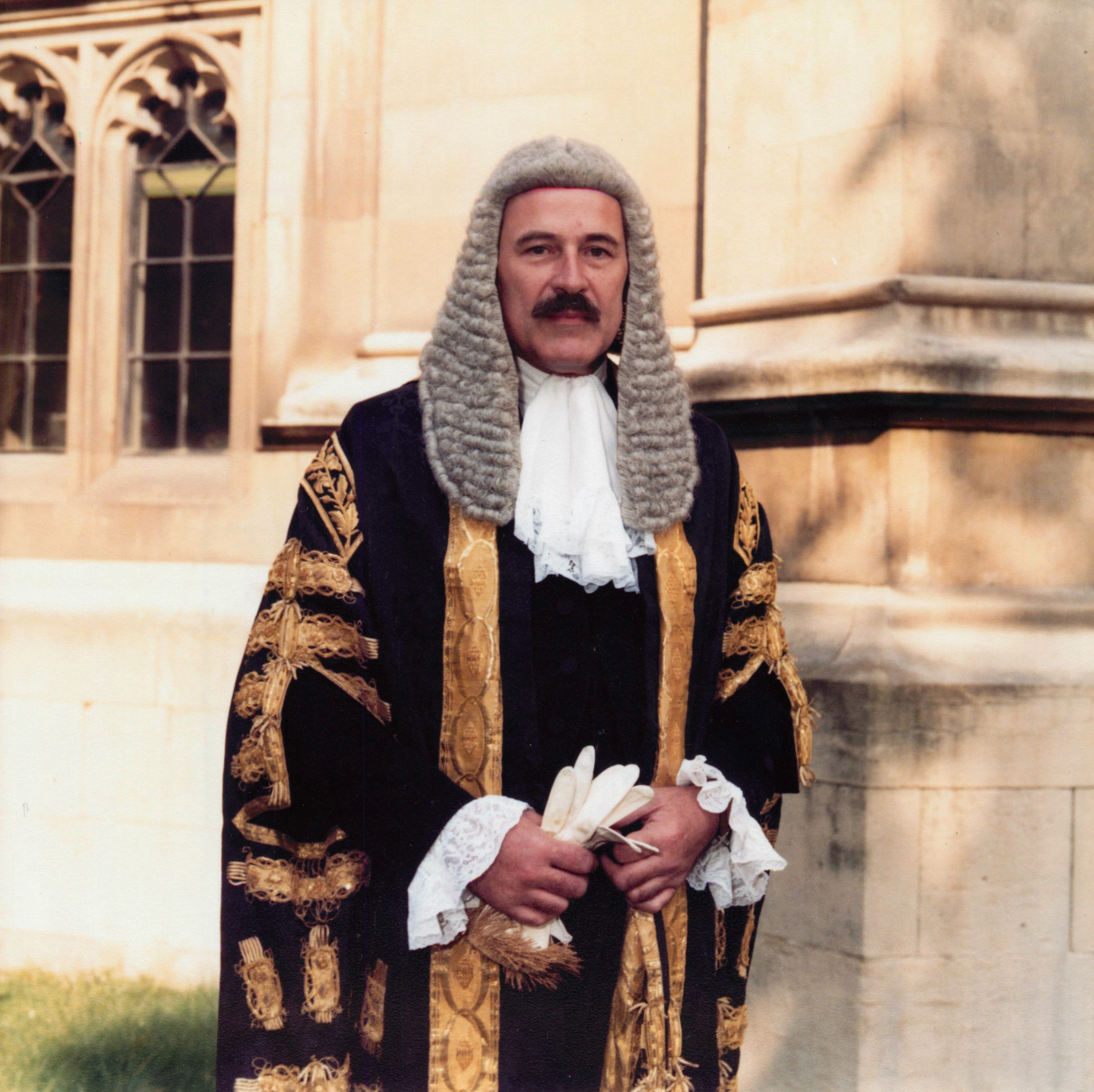
Lord Goff

Name	College	Years at Oxford	Notes	Ref
Cyril Asquith, Baron Asquith of Bishopstone	Balliol	–1913	Elected Fellow of Magdalen College in 1913; appointed a Law Lord in 1951	
James Atkin, Baron Atkin	Magdalen	1884–	appointed a Law Lord in 1928	
Charles Bowen, Baron Bowen	Balliol	1853–1857	Elected Fellow (whilst still an undergraduate) in 1857; appointed a Law Lord in 1893	
Nicholas Browne-Wilkinson, Baron Browne-Wilkinson	Magdalen		Appointed a Law Lord in 1991	
Horace Davey, Baron Davey	University	1852–1856	Fellow of University College 1856–1864; appointed a Law Lord in 1894	
Edmund Davies, Baron Edmund-Davies	Exeter		Appointed a Law Lord in 1966	
Alfred Thompson Denning, Baron Denning	Magdalen	1916–1920 (Mathematics), 1921–1922 (Law)	Degree interrupted by war service 1917–1919. Appointed a Law Lord in 1957; Master of the Rolls 1962–1982	
Kenneth Diplock, Baron Diplock	University		Appointed a Law Lord in 1968	
Robert Goff, Baron Goff of Chieveley	New College		High Steward of Oxford University	
Leonard Hoffmann, Baron Hoffmann	The Queen's		Stowell Fellow, University College	
Brian Hutton, Baron Hutton	Balliol			
Geoffrey Lawrence, 1st Baron Oaksey	New College	–1903	Appointed a Law Lord in 1947	
Michael Nolan, Baron Nolan	Wadham		Appointed a Law Lord in 1994	
Wilfrid Normand, Baron Normand	Oriel	1902–1906	Lord President of the Court of Session 1935–1947; appointed a Law Lord in 1947.	
Cyril Radcliffe, 1st Viscount Radcliffe	New College and All Souls	1919–1921 (New), 1922–1937 (Fellow of All Souls)	Appointed a Law Lord (direct from the bar) in 1949	
Eustace Roskill, Baron Roskill	Exeter College	1930–1932	Appointed a Law Lord in 1980	
Leslie Scarman, Baron Scarman	Brasenose		Appointed a Law Lord in 1977	
Donald Somervell, Baron Somervell of Harrow	Magdalen and All Souls	1907–1911 (Magdalen), 1912– (Fellow of All Souls)	First chemistry graduate to be elected a Fellow of All Souls. Solicitor General 1933–1936, Attorney General 1936–1945, appointed a Law Lord in 1954	
Johan Steyn, Baron Steyn	University		Appointed a Law Lord in 2005	
Richard Wilberforce, Baron Wilberforce	New College and All Souls	–1930 (New), 1932–2003 (All Souls)	Appointed a Law Lord in 1964 (direct from High Court). High Steward of Oxford University 1967–1990	

== Other judges and lawyers: United Kingdom ==
Name	College	Years at Oxford	Notes	Ref
Philip Bell	The Queen's		MP 1951–60, County Court Judge 1960–75, Circuit Judge 1971–75	
Malcolm Bishop	Regent's Park		Deputy High Court Judge, Chair Isle of Man Legal Services Commission	
William Blair	Balliol		Dep High Court Judge 2003–, Chairman of Finsmat 2001–, of Combar 2003–05	
Julius Caesar	Magdalen		Chancellor of the Exchequer 1606–14, Master of the Rolls 1614–36	
John Cameron, Lord Abernethy	Pembroke		Senator of the College of Justice 1992–	
John Taylor Cameron, Lord Coulsfield	Corpus Christi		Senator of the College of Justice 1987–	
Kenneth Cameron, Baron Cameron of Lochbroom	Corpus Christi		Lord Advocate 1984–89	
George Carman	Balliol		barrister 1953, QC 1971, sometime head of chambers New Court	
Joseph William Chitty	Balliol and Exeter		Lord Justice of Appeal 1897–99	
Michael Coulson	Merton		MP 1959–64, Circuit Judge 1983–98	
Thomas Coventry, 1st Baron Coventry	Balliol		Lord Keeper of the Great Seal 1625–40	
Charles Isaac Elton	Balliol and The Queen's		Barrister 1865, QC 1885, MP 1884–85 & 1886–92	
Sir Norris Foster, CBE			Barrister, Warwickshire County Appeal Tribunal, Parliamentary Recruiting Committee, Birmingham Local War Pensions Committee, and the central Committee of the War Pensions and Citizens Committee d. 1925	
Sir Michael Fox	Magdalen		Lord Justice of Appeal 1981–1992	
Arthur Hamilton, Lord Hamilton	Worcester		Lord Justice General and Lord President of the Court of Session 2005–	
Giles Henderson	Magdalen and Pembroke		Senior Partner Slaughter and May 1993–2001	
Leoline Jenkins	Jesus		Royalist, Principal Jesus College, Oxford 1661–73, Secretary of State 1680–84	
John Laws	Exeter		Lord Justice of Appeal 1999–	
Sir Brian Leveson	Merton		current President of the Queen's Bench Division	
Roger Ludlow	Balliol		author of Fundamental Orders of Connecticut	
Ronald King Murray, Lord Murray	Jesus		MP 1970–79, Lord Advocate 1974–79, Senator of the College of Justice 1979–	
Ann Olivarius	Somerville		Chair, McAllister Olivarius, plaintiff in Alexander v. Yale, expert in discrimination, Title IX, revenge porn, sexual harassment law	
William Osgoode	Christ Church		first Chief Justice of Upper Canada 1792–1794, Chief Justice of Lower Canada 1794–1801	
Stephen Richards	St John's		High Court Judge 1997–2005, Presiding Judge for Wales 2000–2003, Lord Justice of Appeal 2005–	
Bernard Rix	New College		Lord Justice of Appeal 2000–	
Geoffrey Robertson	University		QC, Recorder, Master of the Bench, head of chambers, visiting professor	
David Trustram Eve, 2nd Baron Silsoe	Christ Church		barrister 1955, QC 1972, expert in planning law	
Mathew Thorpe	Balliol		Lord Justice of Appeal 1996–	
Lancelot Ware	Lincoln		co–founder of Mesna 1946, barrister 1949, sometime Alderman London County Council	
James Whitelocke	St John's		Justice of the King's Bench 1624–32	
Ivy Williams	Society of Oxford Home-Students	1896–1902 (student), 1920–1945 (lecturer)	First female barrister in England (1921), first female Doctor of Civil Law (1923)	
Norman Wylie, Lord Wylie	St Edmund Hall		MP 1964–74, Ld Advocate 1970–74, Sen Coll of Justice 1974–90, Justice of Appeal Botswana 1994–96	

- Natasha Hausdorff (born 1989), barrister, international news commentator, and Israel advocate

== Judges and lawyers: other countries ==
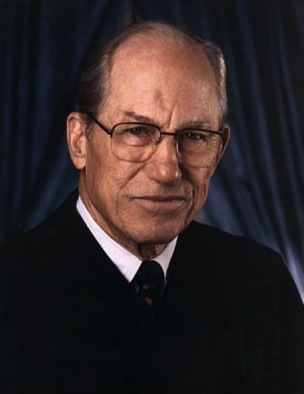
Byron White

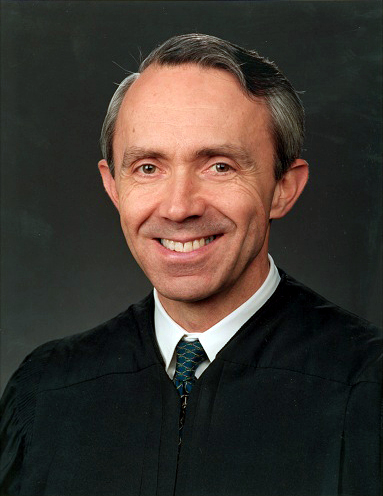
David Souter

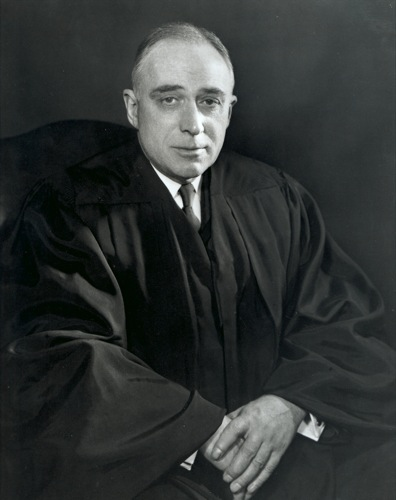
John Marshall Harlan II

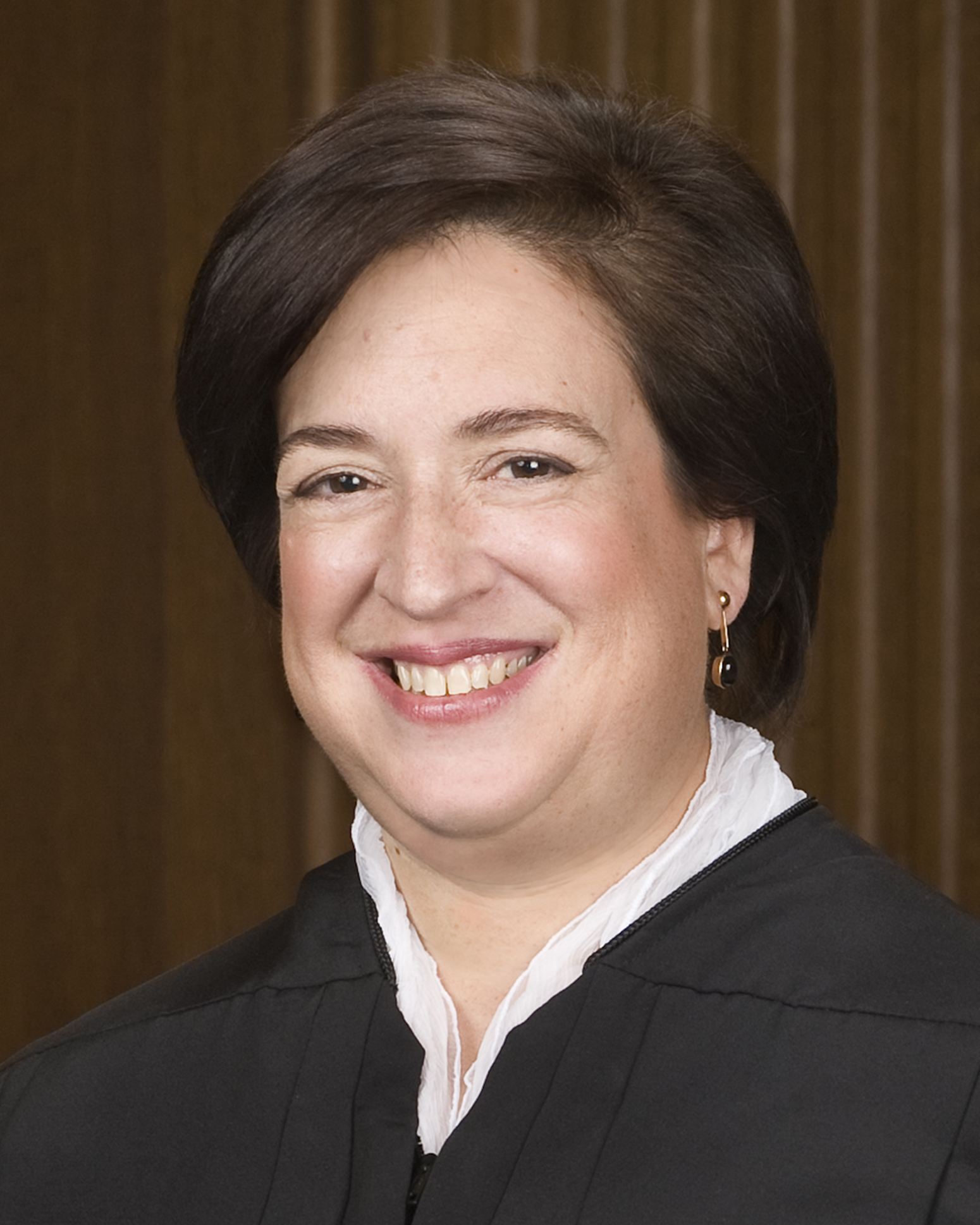
Elena Kagan

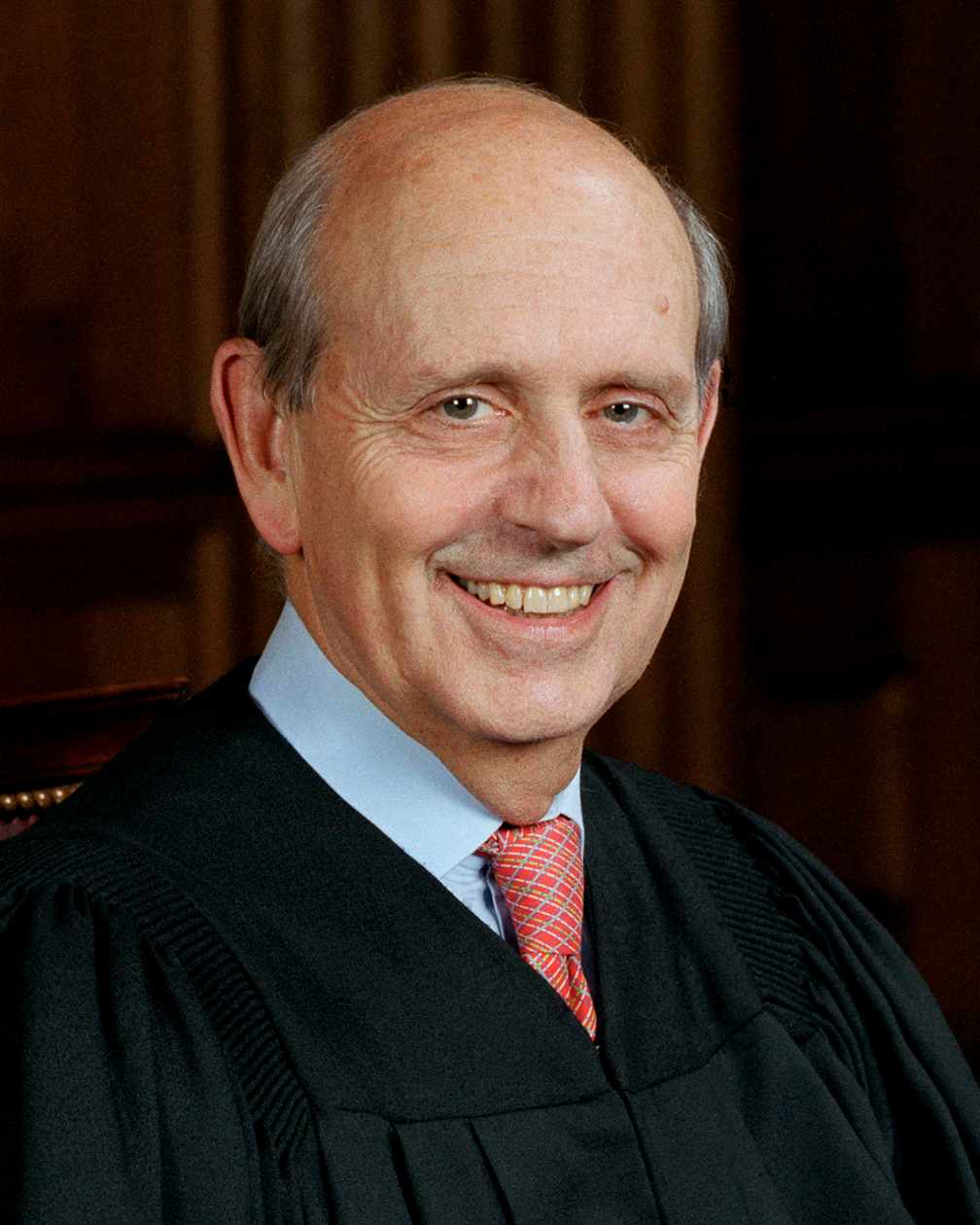
Stephen Breyer

Name	College	Years at Oxford	Country	Notes	Ref
Byron White	Hertford		United States	Associate Justice of the Supreme Court of the United States (1962–1993)	
David Souter	Magdalen		United States	Associate Justice of the Supreme Court of the United States (1990–2009)	
John Marshall Harlan II	Balliol		United States	Associate Justice of the Supreme Court of the United States (1955–1971)	
Elena Kagan	Worcester		United States	Associate Justice of the Supreme Court of the United States (2010–)	
Stephen Breyer	Magdalen		United States	Associate Justice of the Supreme Court of the United States (1994–)	
Neil Gorsuch	University	1992–93, 2004	United States	Associate Justice of the Supreme Court of the United States (2017–)	
Cavinder Bull	Trinity	1989–92	Singapore	Senior counsel	
John Doyle			Australia	Chief Justice of the Supreme Court of South Australia 1995–	
James Edelman			Australia	Justice of the High Court of Australia	
Kenneth Hayne	Exeter		Australia	Justice of the High Court of Australia 1997–	
Dyson Heydon	University		Australia	Justice of the High Court of Australia 2003–	
Michael Hwang			Singapore	Senior Counsel of the Supreme Court of Singapore and Chief Justice of the Dubai International Financial Centre Courts	
Lee Eng Beng			Singapore	Senior Counsel	
Aarif Barma	Exeter		Hong Kong	Justice of appeal, Court of Appeal of Hong Kong 2012–;	
Charles Ching	University		Hong Kong	Permanent judge, Court of Final Appeal of Hong Kong 1997–2000;	
Henry Litton	Merton		Hong Kong	Permanent judge, Court of Final Appeal of Hong Kong 1997–2000;	
David Malcolm			Australia	Chief Justice of Western Australia 1988–2006	
Geoffrey Nettle			Australia	Justice of the High Court of Australia	
Patrick Keane	Magdalen	1970s	Australia	Vinerian Scholar; Judge of Appeal of the Supreme Court of Queensland 2005–	
Joel Bakan			Canada	author of The Corporation: The Pathological Pursuit of Profit and Power (2004)	
Jean Beetz			Canada	Puisne Justice Supreme Court of Canada 1974–88	
Thomas Cromwell	Exeter		Canada	Puisne Justice Supreme Court of Canada 2008–16	
Peter Blaikie			Canada	co–founder Heenan Blaikie (1973), President & Chief Operating Officer Unican Security Systems 1993–98	
Robert Chambers			New Zealand	Supreme Court of New Zealand	
Julien Chouinard			Canada	Puisne Justice Supreme Court of Canada 1979–87	
Yves Fortier			Canada	Permanent Court of Arbitration 1984–9, Ambassador UN 1988–92, Pres London Court of International Arbitration 1998–2001	
Susan Glazebrook			New Zealand	Supreme Court of New Zealand	
Wilbur Jackett			Canada	Chief Justice of the Federal Court of Canada 1971–79	
Gérard La Forest	St John's		Canada	Puisne Justice Supreme Court of Canada 1985–97	
Sherwood Lett			Canada	Chief Justice Supreme Court of British Columbia 1955–64	
Jeremy Lack	Hertford	1984–1989	Switzerland	International Mediator	
Margaret Chew	Brasenose	1985–1988	Singapore	Professor of Law, National University of Singapore	
Howard Rosen	Exeter	1976–1980	Switzerland	Founder of Swiss Friends of Oxford University	
Ronald Martland	Hertford		Canada	Puisne Justice Supreme Court of Canada 1958–82	
Henry G. Nolan			Canada	Prosecutor International Military Tribunal for the Far East 1946–8, Puisne Justice Supreme Court of Canada 1956–7	
Roland Ritchie			Canada	Puisne Justice Supreme Court of Canada 1959–84	
Patrick Yu	Merton		Hong Kong	Advocate, declined appointment to Supreme Court of Hong Kong 1971, 1974, 1979	
M.C. Chagla	Lincoln	1919–22	India	Chief Justice, High Court of Bombay, 1948–1958; Ad Hoc Judge, ICJ 1957–59; Indian High Commissioner in UK, 1962–63; Education Minister, Govt. of India, 1963–66; Minister of External Affairs, Govt. of India, 1966–67.	
Sujata Manohar	Lady Margaret Hall		India	Justice of the Supreme Court of India 1994–99	
Sajjad Zaheer			India		
Kailas Nath Wanchoo	Wadham		India	Chief Justice of the Supreme Court of India 1967–68	
A N Ray	Oriel		India	Chief Justice of the Supreme Court of India 1973–1977	
Ruma Pal			India	Judge, Supreme Court of India 2000–06	
Cornelia Sorabji	Somerville		India	first woman to study law at Oxford, first female advocate in India, first woman to practice law in India and Britain	
Edwin Cameron	Keble and All Souls		South Africa	High Court Judge 95–, Acting Justice Constitutional Court 99–00, Judge of Appeal Supreme Court 00–	
Guido Calabresi	Magdalen		United States	Sterling Professor Emeritus Yale Law School, Judge US Court of Appeals 1994–	
Clifford Durr			United States	attorney who represented Rosa Parks	
William A. Fletcher	Merton		United States	Circuit judge, US Court of Appeals for the Ninth Circuit 1998–	
David Frederick		1987	United States	Successful appellate attorney who has argued 21 cases before the U.S. Supreme Court	
Frank E. Holman			United States	President of the American Bar Association 1948	
Ava Thomas	University of Oxford		United States	US NAVY, Dept of Justice/FBI	
David E. Kendall	Worcester		United States	Criminal defense lawyer, sometime associate counsel NAACP Legal Defense Fund	
Robert Luskin	University		United States	Former US Dept of Justice lawyer, Karl Rove's attorney	

== Academia ==
See List of University of Oxford people in academic disciplines

The list of noted legal scholars includes H. L. A. Hart, Ronald Dworkin, A. V. Dicey, William Blackstone, John Gardner, Timothy Endicott, Peter Birks, John Finnis, Andrew Ashworth, Joseph Raz, Jeremy Waldron, Leslie Green, Tony Honoré, Neil MacCormick, Hugh Collins, John Eekelaar, Robert Stevens, Paul Craig, Ben McFarlane.

Other distinguished practitioners who have attended Oxford include Lord Pannick QC, Geoffrey Robertson QC, Amal Clooney, Lord Faulks QC, Dinah Rose QC, Ben Emmerson QC.

== See also ==
- A select list of former Rhodes Scholars
- List of Vice-Chancellors of the University of Oxford
- List of Current Heads of Oxford University Colleges, Societies, and Halls
