= Alexia Petsalis-Diomidis =

Alexia Petsalis-Diomidis FSA
- Occupation: Classical scholar

Academic background
- Education: University of London
- Thesis: (2001)

Academic work
- Discipline: Classics
- Institutions: University College Dublin; University of Nottingham; University of Warwick; Birkbeck College; King's College London; University of St. Andrews

Alexia Petsalis-Diomidis FSA is Lecturer in Classics at the University of St Andrews where she researchers the cultural history of objects and spaces. She is an expert on the reception of Classical material in Europe in the eighteenth and nineteenth centuries.

== Biography ==
Petsalis-Diomidis studied Classics at Corpus Christi College, Oxford in 1995 before studying for her 2001 PhD in Byzantine and Classical Art History at the University of London. In 2002 she took up a three-year Leverhulme Fellowship. She has worked at University College Dublin, the University of Nottingham, the University of Warwick (2008-2009), and at Birkbeck College (2011). Before joining St Andrews in 2017, from 2012 to 2016 she was lecturer in Classical Greek Art at King's College London. She was elected as a Fellow of the Society of Antiquaries of London on 12 December 2019.

== Select publications ==
- 2003. "Twenty-first century perspectives on The Parthenon", Journal of Hellenic Studies 123: 191-196. doi:10.2307/3246268
- 2007. "Landscape, Transformation, and Divine Epiphany", in Swain, S., Harrison, S. & Elsner, J. (eds.) Severan Culture. Cambridge University Press: 250-289 40.
- 2010. Truly Beyond Wonders: Aelius Aristides and the cult of Asklepios: Ancient Culture and Representation Series. Oxford University Press.
- 2016. "Between the Body and the Divine: Healing Votives from Classical and Hellenistic Greece", in Weinryb, I. (ed.). Ex-Voto. Votive Giving Across Cultures. Bard Graduate Center: 49-75.
- 2018. "Engagements with ancient Greek vases in Ottoman and revolutionary Greece c.1800-1833", in Richardson, E. (ed) Classics in Extremis: The Edges of Classical Reception. Bloomsbury Academic.
