= Augusto Claudio Cuello =

Canadian scientist

Augusto Claudio G. Cuello OC FRSC
- Education: University of Buenos Aires, Oxford University
- Occupations: Professor, Researcher

Augusto Claudio G. Cuello OC FRSC is Professor in the Department of Pharmacology and Therapeutics and Charles E. Frosst/Merck Chair in Pharmacology at McGill University in Montreal, Quebec, Canada.

== Biography ==
He obtained his Doctor of Medicine (M.D.) in 1965 from the University of Buenos Aires in Argentina, followed by a Doctor of Science (D.Sc.) at Oxford University in 1986 for outstanding contributions to the field of neuroscience.

He was Professor in neuropharmacology at Oxford University.

In October 2003, he was named the Charles E. Frosst/Merck Chair in Pharmacology at McGill University.

== Honours ==
In 1997, he was received as a fellow of the Royal Society of Canada in the Academy of Science. He was elected a fellow of the Academy of Medical Sciences in 2018.

== Internal link ==
- Charles Frosst
