= Alan Clemetson =

Alan Clemetson FRCOG FRCSC FACOG
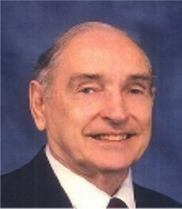
- Born: 31 October 1923; Canterbury, England
- Died: 30 August 2006 (aged 82)

Charles Alan Blake Clemetson (31 October 1923 – 30 August 2006) was a medical doctor, scientist and researcher who published over 48 medical papers and a three-volume monograph, Vitamin C. During his hospital and teaching career, he specialised in obstetrics and gynecology. After retirement in 1991 he devoted his time to researching and publishing papers on Barlow's disease (scurvy in infants), hypothesizing this to be a cause of shaken baby syndrome.

== Biography ==
Clemetson was born in Canterbury, England, attending Wootton Court preparatory school, Wootton, Kent (1930–1935) and The King's School, Canterbury (1935–1942). After preclinical studies at Magdalen College, University of Oxford, he completed his training at Radcliffe Infirmary, graduating from Oxford University Medical School in 1948 with Bachelor of Medicine & Bachelor of Surgery (B.M., B.Ch) degrees.

He married Helen Cowan Forster, a physiotherapist, on 29 March 1947. They had four children.

After graduation, he became a Royal Air Force medical officer for two years, and then returned to Oxford University in 1950 for a MA degree. In 1950, as a research assistant in Obstetrics, he started to pursue research into preeclamptic toxaemia and started to publish medical papers in 1953. In 1952, he was named a Nichols Research Fellow of the Royal Society of Medicine. From 1952 through 1956, he served at various hospitals in England as the House Surgeon of either Obstetrics or Gynecology and, in 1956, became a lecturer in Obstetrics and Gynecology at London University.

Clemetson immigrated to Saskatoon, Canada (1958–1961), becoming an assistant professor of Obstetrics and Gynecology at the University of Saskatoon. During this period, he began to be interested in vitamin C while on an expedition to Rankin Inlet, Nunavut on Hudson Bay. Clemetson was impressed by the good capillary strength of the local Inuit and surmised this to be due to raw fish in their diet.

Then, in 1961, he moved to California and assumed a position as an assistant professor of Obstetrics and Gynecology at the University of California, San Francisco Medical Center, and a lecturer in the Department of Maternal and Child Health at the University of California, Berkeley.

In 1967, he assumed a teaching position (1967–1972) as an assistant professor of Obstetrics and Gynecology with the State University of New York, Brooklyn. He also became the Director of the Obstetrics and Gynecology Department (1967–1981) at the Methodist Hospital of Brooklyn, New York. In addition (1972–1981), he served as a professor in the Department of Obstetrics and Gynecology at the Downstate Medical Center of the State University of New York, Brooklyn, New York.

Clemetson moved to New Orleans, Louisiana in 1981, and became a professor of Obstetrics and Gynecology at Tulane University School of Medicine, and the Director of Obstetrics and Gynecology at the Huey P. Long Medical Center, Pineville, Louisiana. He also became a consultant in Gynecology for the Department of Surgery, Veterans Administration Hospital, Pineville, Louisiana.

Upon his retirement in 1991 as a Professor Emeritus, Tulane University School of Medicine, Clemetson devoted his remaining years to writing and publishing medical papers concerning shaken baby syndrome.

Near the end of his life, he narrowly escaped the New Orleans disaster from Hurricane Katrina, having been warned by his caregiver's meteorologist brother-in-law. He escaped with the latter over the Lake Pontchartrain bridge the day before it was destroyed. He lived in Houston, Texas for nearly a year while his family restored his house, but died of heart failure a few weeks after this was completed.

== Achievements ==
Clemetson had a long and distinguished academic career as a medical doctor, scientist and researcher. During his forty-year professional career, he implemented numerous scientific studies and was instrumental in furthering scientific knowledge. The following achievements are highlights of his life's work that are contained in his extensive Curriculum Vitae.

Clemetson's most notable medico-legal achievement was as the father of the "Motherhood Bill", which requires that all medical insurance carriers in the State of New York include coverage for pregnancy and complications of pregnancy. This so-called Donovan Bill rapidly spread to all 50 states.

University College Hospital – London – 1950–1952 / 1956–1958

- Demonstrated the effects of cord around the neck and of pre-eclampsia on the oxygen saturation of newborn infants.
- Published the first study of "small-for-dates" infants in his studies of "the difference in birth weight of human twins."
- Demonstrated impaired active transfer of amino acids from mother to fetus in pre-eclampsia.
- Demonstrated aortic hypoplasia in some patients following severe early pre-eclampsia.
- Performed and published successful open cardiac massage outside of hospital.

University of California Medical Center – San Francisco – 1961–1967

- Bioflavonoids and catechins – Solved the old "Vitamin P" problem, by showing that bioflavonoids with certain structural characteristics act as indirect antioxidants for Vitamin C. See: Plant Polyphenols Monograph in New York Academy of Sciences.
- Pre-eclampsia – Demonstrated a disturbance of ascorbic acid metabolism in pre-eclampsia and in abruptio placentae.
  - Methodist Hospital of Brooklyn – New York – 1967–1981
- Developed a new method for measuring the bilirubin content of amniotic fluid.
- In collaboration with the Department of Anesthesiology, he showed an improved oxygen saturation in the umbilical cord of blood of babies delivered by Caesarean Section under spinal anesthesia when the mother is placed in a left-side-down tilt position.
- In collaboration with Drs. Mallikarjuneswara and Moshfeghi, he was able to measure the electrical charge on fertilized rat ova, and this was the first time that anyone had ever measured the electrical charge on any mammalian ovum.
- He showed conclusively that women on the pill need more Vitamin C than usual, and, as a result of this, a special vitamin formula called "Feminins" was developed and marketed for women on the pill.
- His research on the uterine luminal fluid in the rat showed that estrogen causes secretion and progesterone causes reabsorption of uterine luminal fluid.
- In collaboration with J.K. Kim and others, he showed that the luteal phase of the human menstrual cycle is the reabsorptive phase, and not the secretory phase.
- In recent research, he has shown that people with low vitamin C levels have very high blood histamine levels.
- He was able to relate the above observation to abruptio placentae, as women with low ascorbate (Vitamin C) and high histamine levels are prone to develop premature separation of the placenta.

Tulane University School of Medicine 1981–1990

- Wrote three-volume monograph, Vitamin C.

== Medical hypotheses ==
In 1964, Clemetson conducted and published the first studies concerning ascorbic acid (vitamin C) metabolism and depletion in pre-eclampsia.

After Clemetson's retirement from teaching in 1991, his work focused on developing the hypothesis that the hemorrhages seen in infants with shaken baby syndrome are caused not by inflicted trauma, but by capillary damage due to Barlow's disease (subclinical scurvy) – a condition called by proponents Clemetson/Kalokerinos syndrome. The mechanism he argued to be high histamine levels associated with low serum vitamin C, the latter deficiency arising before birth due to factors such as the pregnant mother's malnutrition, and in the infant by recurrent infections and recent multiple vaccinations.

His four main papers on this topic, published in the controversial and non-peer reviewed journal Medical Hypotheses, are: "The key role of histamine in the development of atherosclerosis and coronary heart disease", "Barlow's disease", "Capillary fragility as a cause of subdural hemorrhage in infants" and "Elevated blood histamine caused by vaccinations and vitamin c deficiency may mimic the shaken baby syndrome".

== Publications ==
Books

- Vitamin C, Volumes I, II, III. Monograph by C.A.B. Clemetson, 1989 CRC Press, Boca Raton, Florida, ISBN 0-8493-4841-2

Journal articles

- Clemetson, C. Alan B. (Spring 2006). "Caffey Revisited: A Commentary on the Origin of 'Shaken Baby Syndrome'" (PDF). Journal of American Physicians and Surgeons. 11 (1): 20–21.
- Clemetson CA (November 2004). "Shaken baby syndrome: a medicolegal problem". The New Zealand Medical Journal. 117 (1205): U1160. PMID 15570337.
- Clemetson, C. Alan B. (July 2004). "Capillary Fragility as a Cause of Substantial Hemorrhage in Infants" (PDF). Medical Hypotheses and Research. 1 (2/3): 121–129. Archived from the original (PDF) on 4 March 2009.
- Clemetson CA (2004) "Was it "shaken baby" or a variant of Barlow's disease?" J Am Phys Surg 9: 78–80 (PDF)
- Clemetson, CAB (2004) "Capillary Fragility as a Cause of Subdural and Retinal Hemorrhages in Infancy." Red Flags – Editorial – 10 August
- Clemetson CA (February 2004). "Individual reactions following vaccinations or inoculations are highly variable". Military Medicine. 169 (2): v. PMID 15040623.
- Clemetson CA (2004). "Elevated blood histamine caused by vaccinations and Vitamin C deficiency may mimic the shaken baby syndrome". Medical Hypotheses. 62 (4): 533–6. doi:10.1016/j.mehy.2003.12.023. PMID 15050101.
- Clemetson CA (2002) "Shaken baby or scurvy?" Journal of Orthomolecular Medicine 17(4):193-196
- Clemetson CA (July 2002). "Barlow's disease". Medical Hypotheses. 59 (1): 52–6. doi:10.1016/S0306-9877(02)00114-7. PMID 12160680.
- Clemetson CA (2002) Was the baby shaken? Townsend Letter for Doctors and Patients #222, pp. 112–13
- Clemetson CA (1999) "Vaccinations, inoculations and ascorbic acid." J. Orthomolecular Medicine 14:137–142
- Clemetson CA (January 1999). "The key role of histamine in the development of atherosclerosis and coronary heart disease". Medical Hypotheses. 52 (1): 1–8. doi:10.1054/mehy.1997.0775. PMID 10342662.
- Clemetson CA (1991). "Vitamin C and multifactorial disease". Journal of Orthomolecular Medicine. 6: 161–165.
- Champagne ET, Hinojosa O, and Clemetson CA (1990) "Production of Ascorbate Free Radicals in Infant Formulas and Other Media." J Food Sci 55(4):1133-6.
- Clemetson CA, Cafaro V (December 1981). "Abruptio placentae". International Journal of Gynaecology and Obstetrics. 19 (6): 453–60. doi:10.1016/0020-7292(81)90004-7. PMID 6121727. S2CID 24057010.
- Clemetson CA (1 April 1980). "Histamine and ascorbic acid in human blood". Journal of Nutrition. 110 (4): 662–8. doi:10.1093/jn/110.4.662. PMID 7365537.
- Clemetson CA (August 1979). "Some thoughts on the epidemiology of cardiovascular disease, (with special reference to women "on the pill"). Role of ascorbic acid". Medical Hypotheses. 5 (8): 825–34. doi:10.1016/0306-9877(79)90072-0. PMID 514120.
- Clemetson CA, de Carlo SJ, Burney GA, Patel TJ, Kozhiashvili N, Taylor RA (1978). "Estrogens in food: the almond mystery". International Journal of Gynaecology and Obstetrics. 15 (6): 515–21. doi:10.1002/j.1879-3479.1977.tb00745.x. PMID 29799. S2CID 29750544.
- Clemetson CA, Verma UL, De Carlo SJ (March 1977). "Secretion and reabsorption of uterine luminal fluid in rats". Journal of Reproduction and Fertility. 49 (2): 183–7. doi:10.1530/jrf.0.0490183. PMID 557549.
- Clemetson CA (1976). "Ascorbic acid and diabetes mellitus". Medical Hypotheses. 2 (5): 193–4. doi:10.1016/0306-9877(76)90037-2. PMID 967063.
- Tantayaporn P, Mallikarjuneswara VR, de Carlo J, Clemetson CA (October 1974). "The effects of estrogen and progesterone on the volume and electrolyte content of the uterine luminal fluid of the rat". Endocrinology. 95 (4): 1034–45. doi:10.1210/endo-95-4-1034. PMID 4416234.
- Clemetson CA, Hassan R, Mallikarjuneswara VR, Wallace G (August 1973). "Tilt-bend cesarean section". Obstetrics and Gynecology. 42 (2): 290–8. PMID 4721420.
- Clemetson CA, Kim JK, De Jesus TP, Mallikarjuneswara VR, Wilds JH (June 1973). "Human uterine fluid potassium and the menstrual cycle". The Journal of Obstetrics and Gynaecology of the British Commonwealth. 80 (6): 553–61. doi:10.1111/j.1471-0528.1973.tb15980.x. PMID 4720532. S2CID 73360112.
- Mallikarjuneswara VR, de Jesus TP, Clemetson CA (1972). "The effect of an intrauterine foreign body on the sodium and potassium concentrations of the uterine fluid of the rat". Contraception. 6 (6): 499–512. doi:10.1016/s0010-7824(72)80014-3.
- Clemetson CA, Kim JK, Mallikarjuneswara VR, Wilds JH (September 1972). "The sodium and potassium concentrations in the uterine fluid of the rat at the time of implantation". The Journal of Endocrinology. 54 (3): 417–23. doi:10.1677/joe.0.0540417. PMID 5071364.
- Kalesh DG, Mallikarjuneswara VR, Clemetson CA (1971). "Effect of estrogen-containing oral contraceptives on platelet and plasma ascorbic acid concentrations". Contraception. 4 (3): 183–192. doi:10.1016/s0010-7824(71)80004-5.
- Saroja N, Mallikarjuneswara VR, Clemetson CA (1971). "Effect of estrogens on ascorbic acid in the plasma and blood vessels of guinea pigs". Contraception. 3 (4): 269–277. doi:10.1016/0010-7824(71)90027-8.
- Ansari I, Wallace G, Clemetson CA, Mallikarjuneswara VR, Clemetson CD (August 1970). "Tilt caesarean section". The Journal of Obstetrics and Gynaecology of the British Commonwealth. 77 (8): 713–21. doi:10.1111/j.1471-0528.1970.tb03597.x. PMID 5452133. S2CID 37436094.
- Clemetson CA, Mallikarjuneswara VR, Moshfeghi MM, Carr JJ, Wilds JH (July 1970). "The effects of oestrogen and progesterone on the sodium and potassium concentrations of rat uterine fluid". The Journal of Endocrinology. 47 (3): 309–19. doi:10.1677/joe.0.0470309. PMID 5465726.
- Clemetson CA, Moshfeghi MM, Mallikarjuneswara VR (1970). "Electrophoretic mobility of the rat blastocyst". Contraception. 1 (5): 357–360. doi:10.1016/0010-7824(70)90019-3.
- Mallikarjuneswara VR, Clemetson CA, Carr JJ (1 March 1970). "Determination of bilirubin in amniotic fluid. A new, simple, and efficient method". Clinical Chemistry. 16 (3): 180–4. doi:10.1093/clinchem/16.3.180. PMID 5437956.
- Clemetson CA (1969) "Menorrhagia rheumatica." La Vie Medicale, No Hors Serie, Decembre, pp 1–10: Symposium International – Paroi Vasculaire et Flavonoides – Comptes Rendus – Hospital Saint-Antoine, Paris, 27 June.
- Clemetson CA (1966) l Bioflavonoidi Quali Antioossidanti per L’AQcido Ascorbico Symposium sui Biolavonoidi, Stresa, Italy 23 April, pp 584–593
- Clemetson CA, Andersen L (September 1966). "Plant polyphenols as antioxidants for ascorbic acid". Annals of the New York Academy of Sciences. 136 (14): 341–76. Bibcode:1966NYASA.136..341C. doi:10.1111/j.1749-6632.1966.tb19021.x. PMID 4961574. S2CID 26145159.
- Clemetson CA, Andersen L (November 1964). "Ascorbic acid metabolism in preeclampsia". Obstetrics and Gynecology. 24: 744–82. PMID 14227609.
- Alan C, Clemetson CA, Blair LM (May 1962). "Capillary strength of women with menorrhagia". American Journal of Obstetrics and Gynecology. 83 (10): 1269–79. doi:10.1016/S0002-9378(16)36034-3. PMID 13860008.
- Clemetson CA, Blair LM, Reed DH (May 1962). "Estrogens and capillary strength". American Journal of Obstetrics and Gynecology. 83 (10): 1261–8. doi:10.1016/S0002-9378(16)36033-1. PMID 13879913.
- Clemetson CA, Blair L, Brown AB (April 1962). "Capillary strength and the menstrual cycle". Annals of the New York Academy of Sciences. 93 (7): 279–99. Bibcode:1962NYASA..93..279C. doi:10.1111/j.1749-6632.1962.tb30520.x. PMID 13879912. S2CID 11922474.
- Brown AB, Clemetson CA (1961). "Influence of environmental temperature on survival of premature animals". Can. Med. Assoc. J. 84 (9): 491–494. PMC 1939309. PMID 20326653.
- Clemetson CA (February 1960). "Aortic hypoplasia and its significance in the aetiology of pre-eclamptic toxaemia". The Journal of Obstetrics and Gynaecology of the British Empire. 67: 90–101. doi:10.1111/j.1471-0528.1960.tb06956.x. PMID 13810651. S2CID 6416619.
- Clemetson CA (December 1958). "Ectopia vesicae and split pelvis; an account of pregnancy in a woman with treated ectopia vesicae and split pelvis, including a review of the literature". The Journal of Obstetrics and Gynaecology of the British Empire. 65 (6): 973–81. doi:10.1111/j.1471-0528.1958.tb08591.x. PMID 13621295. S2CID 35617487.
- Clemetson CA (February 1956). "The difference in birth weight of human twins. Twin blood studies. III. Placental transfer of amino-acids". The Journal of Obstetrics and Gynaecology of the British Empire. 63 (1): 15–8. doi:10.1111/j.1471-0528.1956.tb05429.x. PMID 13295857. S2CID 1654659.
- Clemetson CA (February 1956). "The difference in birth weight of human twins. Twin blood studies. II. Cord blood haemoglobin levels". The Journal of Obstetrics and Gynaecology of the British Empire. 63 (1): 9–14. doi:10.1111/j.1471-0528.1956.tb05428.x. PMID 13295856. S2CID 221486526.
- Clemetson CA (February 1956). "The difference in birth weight of human twins. Twin blood studies. I. Oxygen analysis of umbilical cord blood". The Journal of Obstetrics and Gynaecology of the British Empire. 63 (1): 1–8. doi:10.1111/j.1471-0528.1956.tb05427.x. PMID 13295855. S2CID 26145079.
- Clemetson CA, Churchman J (June 1955). "Plasma amino-acid levels following protein ingestion by pregnant and non-pregnant subjects". The Journal of Obstetrics and Gynaecology of the British Empire. 62 (3): 390–4. doi:10.1111/j.1471-0528.1955.tb14156.x. PMID 14392520. S2CID 2200581.
- Clemetson CA (June 1954). "The placental transfer of amino-acids in normal and toxaemic pregnancy". The Journal of Obstetrics and Gynaecology of the British Empire. 61 (3): 364–71. doi:10.1111/j.1471-0528.1954.tb07496.x. PMID 13175066. S2CID 10876797.
- Clemetson CA, Churchman J (June 1953). "Oxygen and carbon dioxide content of umbilical artery and vein blood in toxaemic and normal pregnancy". The Journal of Obstetrics and Gynaecology of the British Empire. 60 (3): 335–44. doi:10.1111/j.1471-0528.1953.tb14068.x. PMID 13061996. S2CID 279339.
- Clemetson CA (February 1953). "The oxygen saturation of umbilical artery and vein blood at birth, with special reference to cord obstruction". Proceedings of the Royal Society of Medicine. 46 (2): 94–7. doi:10.1177/003591575304600208. PMC 1918506. PMID 13037711.
- Clemetson, C. Alan B. (1980). "Histamine and Ascorbic Acid in Human Blood". The Journal of Nutrition. 110 (4). Elsevier BV: 662–668. doi:10.1093/jn/110.4.662. ISSN 0022-3166.
- Clemetson, C. A. B.; Kim, J. K.; De Jesus, T. P. S.; Mallikarjuneswara, V. R.; Wilds, J. H. (1973). "HUMAN UTERINE FLUlD POTASSIUM AND THE MENSTRUAL CYCLE". BJOG: An International Journal of Obstetrics & Gynaecology. 80 (6): 553–561. doi:10.1111/j.1471-0528.1973.tb15980.x. ISSN 1470-0328.

== Memberships in learned societies ==
- Member of the British Medical Association
- Fellow of the Royal Society of Medicine
- Member of the New York Academy of Sciences
- Member of the New York Obstetrical Society
- President of the Brooklyn Gynecological Society
- Member of the Medical Society of the County of Kings and Academy of Medicine of Brooklyn
- Fellow of the American College of Obstetricians and Gynaecologists
- Fellow of the Royal College of Surgeons of Canada
- Fellow of the American College of Nutrition

== See also ==
- Viera Scheibner
- Archie Kalokerinos
