= International Strategic Research Organization =

Turkish think tank

The International Strategic Research Organization (USAK, acronym from its Turkish name Uluslararası Stratejik Araştırma Kurumu) is an independent think-tank established in 2004. It pursues interdisciplinary studies on national and international political, economic and security issues.

Its core research areas are: international security, terrorism, international relations, Middle East, Africa, Central Asia, Caucasus, European Union, Balkans, Asia-Pacific, Americas, international law and energy.

Its central office is in Ankara, Mebusevleri. USAK currently has 30 regular experts/researchers and 8 technical employees. Moreover, the organization works with more than one hundred academicians, experts and researchers throughout Turkey and worldwide. Volunteers and part-time employees also contribute to the work of USAK.

It also offers internship and training programs. Until now, more than a thousand people from Turkey and abroad have participated in these programs.

== Structure ==
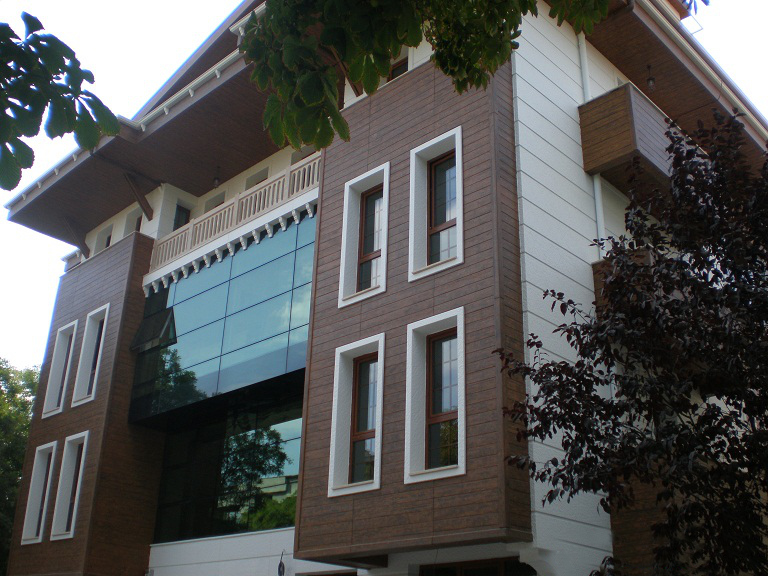
USAK House Turkey's first and only think-tank purposed building, Ankara, 2010

USAK has four main components; the Academic Council, Administrative Council, Supervisory Council and the group of Honorary Members.

Prof. Dr Yusuf Ziya Özcan headed the Academic Council between 2004 and 2008. Prof. Dr. Sedat Laçiner, who is the founding president of USAK, led the organization between 2004 and 2010 and Tayyibe Gülek, the former minister of state and deputy chairman of Democratic Left Party, was the honorary president between 2004 and 2008. In June 2010, Özdem Sanberk, former undersecretary of the Ministry of Foreign Affairs and retired ambassador, became president of USAK and Prof. Dr İhsan Bal became head of the Academic Council. Prof. Dr. Kamer Kasım, Prof. Dr. Selçuk Çolakoğlu and Mehmet Tiraş are the current vice-presidents of the organization.

== Research centers ==
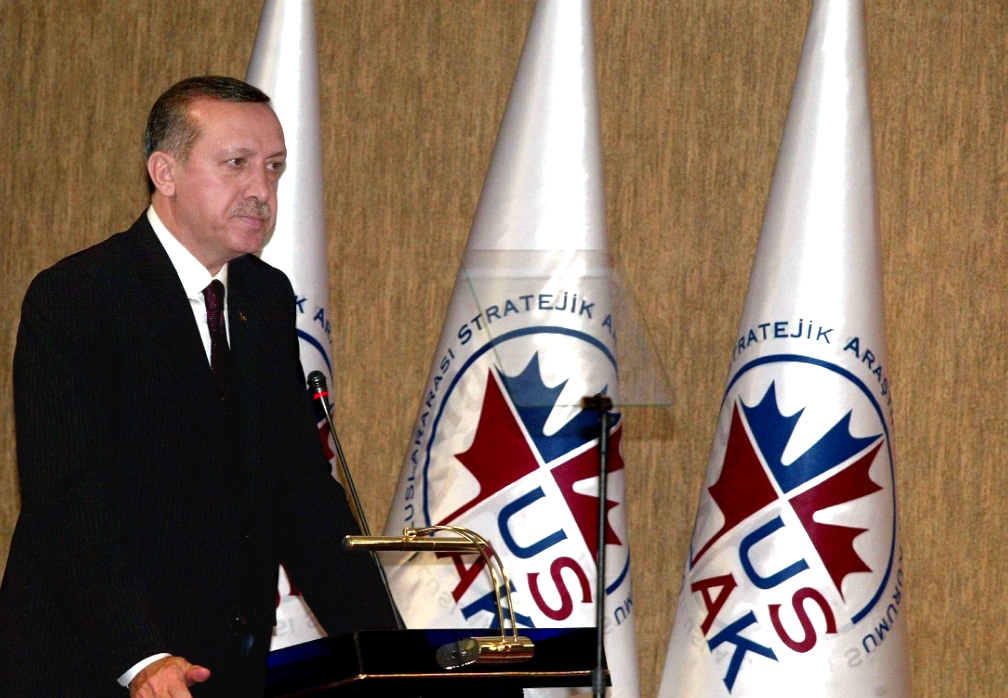
Turkish Prime Minister Recep Tayyip Erdoğan gives lecture at the USAK House on Turkish Foreign and Defence Policy, 3 February 2010

- USAK Center for European Union Studies
- USAK Center for Security Studies
- USAK Center for Middle East and African Studies
- USAK Center for American Studies
- USAK Center for Eurasian Studies
- USAK Center for Asia-Pacific Studies
- USAK Center for Energy Security Studies
- USAK Center for Social Sciences
- USAK Center for International Law

== Activities ==
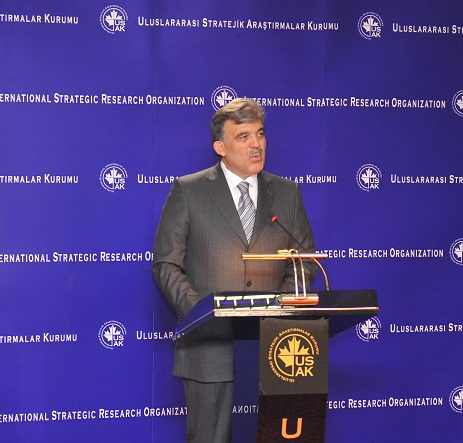
Turkish President Abdullah Gül gives the first lecture at the USAK, 4 November 2009

- Book Publications
- Internet Publications
- Report and Policy Briefs
- Projects
- Consulting Services
- Media Services
- Seminars, Conferences and Workshops
- Internship and Training Programs

== Publications ==
=== Reports and policy briefs ===
USAK prepares its reports and policy briefs with the aim of analyzing world affairs in the academic discipline. The aim of these publications, which are supported by field research, is primarily to convey accurate information to decision-makers and other relevant readers. USAK has published 43 reports and 28 policy briefs both in English and Turkish.

=== Books ===
USAK's books primarily deal with international politics, internal & external security and sociology, and are written by its core staff with the contribution of other writers. The number of books published by USAK has reached 63.

=== Analist Magazine ===
Analist is a monthly magazine that was launched in March 2011. Analist provides in-depth analysis of regional & global issues and Turkey's approach thereto within the framework of a different theme each month. Its mission is to fill the gap between foreign policy, politics and strategy formation with its expertise, concrete figures and analytical perspective. In that sense, it is one of the most renowned political magazines in Turkey. Analist has a wide cadre of authors that brings together academics, professionals, bureaucrats and politicians on the same platform. It reaches a widespread audience with five thousand copies published each month.

=== The Journal of Central Asian and Caucasian Studies ===
The Journal of Central Asian and Caucasian Studies (OAKA) is a peer-reviewed scientific Journal. It is published twice a year (in the winter and summer). In OAKA, academic articles and book reviews are published both in English and Turkish. The journal focuses on legal, political, sociological, cultural, social, religious, anthropological and economic studies regarding Central Asia, the Caucasus and neighboring states' (Turkey, Iran, Pakistan, India, Afghanistan, China, Mongolia, Russia) and relevant regions' (Black Sea, South Asia, Middle East, Far East) relations with Central Asia and the Caucasus.

=== The Review of International Law and Politics ===
The Review of International Law and Politics (UHP) is a peer-reviewed journal that is published four times a year (in the winter, spring, summer and autumn). The journal publishes scholarly articles and book reviews in English and Turkish. Although the journal is an independent publication in terms of scientific research, it mainly focuses on international relations, international law and political history. Moreover, the journal accepts papers from scholars all over the world on area studies (Balkans, Caucasus, Europe, Central Asia, etc.), international security, international relations, sociology and anthropology.

=== USAK Yearbook ===
The USAK Yearbook of Politics and International Relations is an annual, peer-reviewed, English language scholarly journal. The publication consists of USAK experts and researchers' most exclusive articles and reviews written during that year. Original works written by other academicians and researchers in their respective fields are also included in the yearbook. Therefore, it handles a broad range of issues that were visible in the year prior to its publication, ranging from politics to economy and international law to security.

=== Journal of Turkish Weekly ===
Journal of Turkish Weekly (JTW) is a respected Turkish news source that reports on international politics in the English language. It was established in 2004. Apart from the reports and comments of its staff, JTW also republishes articles from respected international news sources including Anadolu Agency, Hurriyet Daily News, RFERL, VOA News, Voice of Russia, IWPR, Jerusalem Post, Mehr News, Balkan Insight, Independent Balkan News Agency, SETimes, Xinhua, voxEU.org, Project-Syndicate, REGNUM, Eurasian Home, Uzreport, Sofia News Agency and others.

== International partners ==
USAK often undertakes activities with its international partners, including common field research, conferences and seminars and joint publications.

- Brookings Institution
- Council on Foreign Relations (CFR)
- The Washington Institute for Near Eastern Policies (WINEP)
- Center for Strategic and International Studies (CSIS)
- Near East South Asia Center for Strategic Studies (NESA)
- Atlantic Council
- Think-tanks from the Middle East, Central Asia and Southeast Asia

== USAK House ==
USAK's main building, "USAK House", is Turkey's first ever think-tank building. The 7-story building was opened by President Abdullah Gül on November 4, 2009. The architect of the building is Soner Gükdemir.
