= Özdem Sanberk =

Turkish diplomat

Özdem Sanberk (born 1 August 1938) is a retired Turkish diplomat.

Sanberk was ambassador to the European Union from 1987 to 1991 and to the United Kingdom from 1995 to 2000. In 2010, he became director of the International Strategic Research Organization (USAK).

He is a Senior Network Member at the European Leadership Network (ELN).
