= Christopher Brewin =

British academic and expert on Cyprus

- Born: 1945; London, England
- Died: 2018 (aged 72–73)
- Citizenship: British
- Education: University of Oxford
- Known for: Academia
- Scientific career
- Fields: International relations
- Workplaces: Keele University

Christopher Brewin was a British academic and expert on Cyprus. He was a Senior Lecturer in International relations at Keele University, Staffordshire, England from 1972 until his retirement in 2008. He died in July 2018.

== Education ==
Brewin was educated at the University of Grenoble, Études Françaises, the University of Oxford (where he held an Open Exhibition in English at St John's College and an Open Scholarship in Modern History at Christ Church), and at Harvard University (where he was awarded a Fulbright Scholarship, Frank Knox Memorial Fellowship, and Sinclair Kennedy Fellowship, as well as the Keith Feiling History Prize).

== Memberships ==
Chris Brewin was a member of the Royal Institute of International Affairs, Chatham House, the British International Studies Association, the University Association for Contemporary European Studies, the Turkish Area Study Group, and the Association for Greek, Turkish and Cypriot Affairs. He contributed to many International Relations journals and was a member of Review of International Law and Politics International Advisory Board.

== Bibliography ==
- (2000) The European Union and Cyprus Huntingdon: Eothen (hardcover, ISBN 0-906719-31-3; paperback, ISBN 0-906719-24-0)
- (2002) Turkey and Europe after the Nice Summit TESEV Publications (ISBN 9758112376)
