= Colin Baigent =

English epidemiology professor

- Occupations: Academic physician, and cardiovascular epidemiologist

Academic background
- Education: BA in Mathematics, BM BCh Medicine, MSc in Epidemiology
- Alma mater: University of Oxford; University of London

Colin Baigent (born 1961) is a British academic physician and cardiovascular epidemiologist. He is a professor of epidemiology, Director of the Medical Research Council Population Health Research Unit at the University of Oxford, and deputy director of the Clinical Trial Service Unit and Epidemiological Studies Unit (CTSU), part of Oxford Population Health (the Nuffield Department of Population Health at the University of Oxford). His work is focused in the design and coordination of large-scale randomised trials and the use of meta-analysis to assess the efficacy and safety of drugs for the prevention of cardiovascular disease (CVD) or premature death.

== Education ==
Baigent was educated at St Bartholomew's School, Newbury, Berkshire. He studied mathematics at the University of Oxford, where he graduated in 1983. In 1995, he completed an MSc in epidemiology at the London School of Hygiene & Tropical Medicine, University of London.

== Career ==
Baigent started his research career as a Junior Research Fellow at Green College at the University of Oxford in 1993. He was then appointed as an Honorary Senior Clinical Lecturer in 2000, Reader in Clinical Epidemiology in 2002, and since 2006 has served as a professor of epidemiology. He has been deputy director of the Clinical Trial Service Unit and Epidemiological Studies Unit (CTSU) since 2013 and Director of the MRC Population Health Research Unit at the University of Oxford since 2016. He is also an Honorary Consultant in cardiovascular epidemiology at the Oxford University Hospitals NHS Foundation Trust.

== Research ==
=== Chronic kidney disease and CVD ===
Baigent pioneered the design and conduct of large-scale randomised trials in chronic kidney disease alongside Martin Landray. He served as Chief Investigator of the SHARP (Study of Heart and Renal Protection) trial, which recruited over 9,000 patients and established the efficacy and safety of lowering cholesterol in patients with chronic kidney disease. More recently, his group has completed the EMPA-KIDNEY trial, which recruited over 6,600 patients, and demonstrated the efficacy and safety of empagliflozin for slowing progression of kidney disease.

=== Cardiovascular epidemiology ===
Baigent has coordinated many collaborative meta-analyses in which individual participant data from randomised controlled trials have been used to develop a better understanding of the effects and safety of drug treatments. Since 1993, he has coordinated the Cholesterol Treatment Trialists’ (CTT) Collaboration with Rory Collins, which has provided information about the efficacy and safety of statin therapy in people with or without cardiovascular disease. He has also coordinated the Antithrombotic Treatment Trialists’ (ATT) Collaboration, which has shown that daily low-dose aspirin does not result in a net benefit for primary prevention, whereas in secondary prevention the benefits of aspirin greatly outweigh the bleeding risks.

== Awards and honors ==
- 2005 – Elected Fellow, Faculty of Public Health, London
- 2006 – Elected Fellow, Royal College of Physicians, London
- 2015 – Elected Fellow, European Society of Cardiology
- 2019 – Elected Fellow, Academy of Medical Sciences (United Kingdom)
