= Malcolm Kelland =

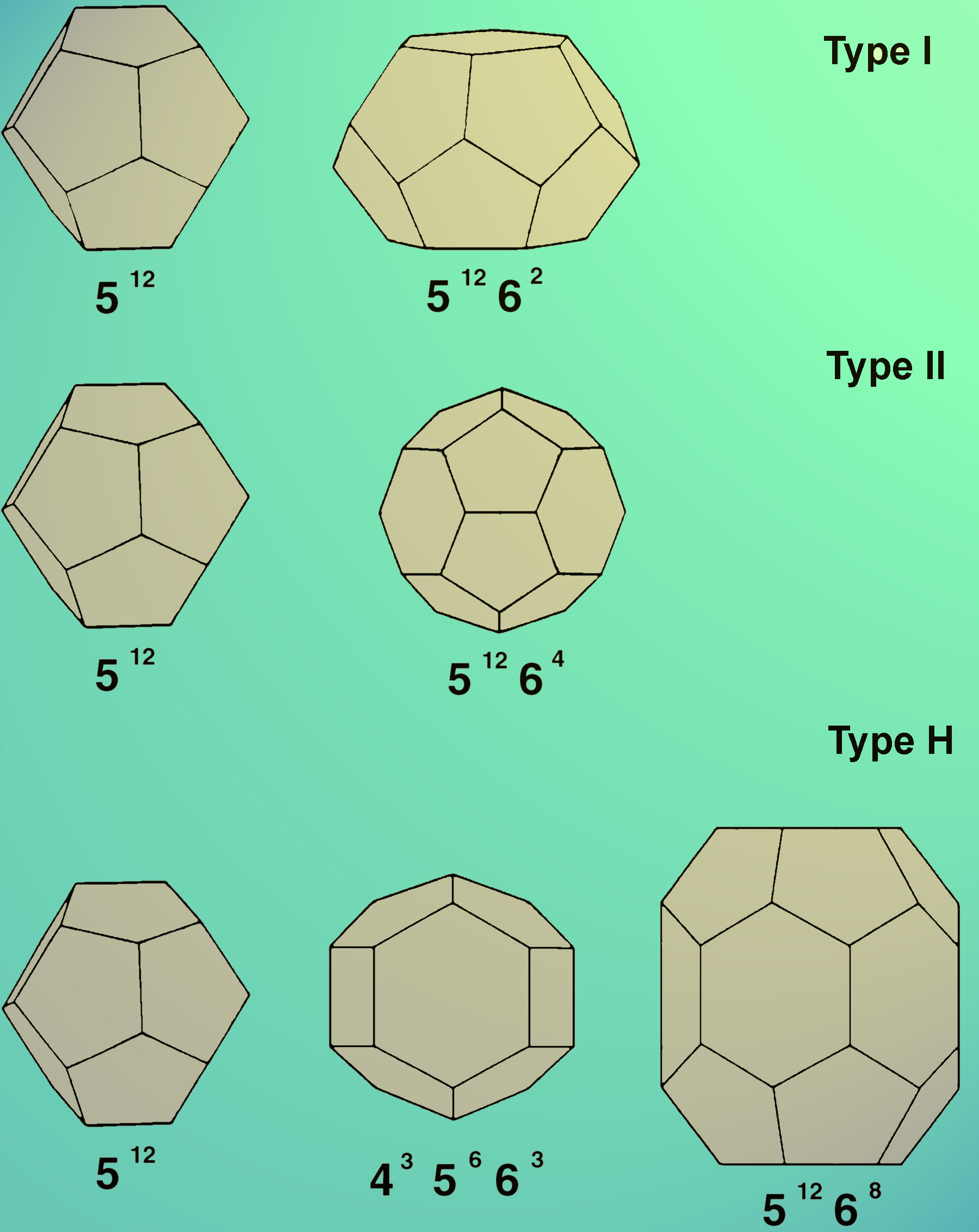
The picture shows three of the crystal formations that become gas hydrates and causes freezing and blocking of oil pipes.

Malcolm Andrew Kelland (9 October 1963) is a retired professor of chemistry at University of Stavanger in Norway, known for inventing environmentally friendly chemicals for the oil industry.

He was educated at Whitgift School in Croydon, London. He went on to study chemistry at Oxford University from 1983 to 1990 and was awarded a DPhil in Organometallic chemistry. He undertook postdoctoral research with Rinaldo Poli at the University of Maryland. From 1991 to 2000 he worked at Rogalandsforskning, a Norwegian research institute located in Stavanger (established 1973). Since 2000 he has worked at Stavanger College, which since 2004 has been known as the University of Stavanger.

His research has resulted in Kinetic Inhibitors. These are chemicals that aim at preventing gas hydrates, which is ice formation in oil pipes, a process that also may clog the pipes and cause damage to personnel. The inventions are from the class of Low Dosage gas Hydrate Inhibitors (LDHI) and also include green anti-aggomerants (AAs). These KHIs and AAs cause less pollution than chemicals that have been traditionally used such as methanol and glycol.

Some of his inventions are inspired by how fish survive in cold waters, and use degradable components that resemble the protein found in fish. Kelland is registered as inventor of several patents, some owned by oil companies such as Exxon, and in 2011 he co-founded the company Eco Inhibitors, later sold to Italmatch, Italy. Since 2010 he has been the leader of the «Green Production Chemistry» research project.

More recently, his interest in modifying and inhibiting gas hydrate crystal formation has been extended to controlling the growth of other crystals including scales (barite, calcite), kidney stones, ice, wax and fertilisers. He has published numerous peer-reviewed journal articles on his research. In 2009 (2nd edition in 2014) he also published a book entitled Production Chemicals for the Oil and Gas Industry.

He has received several prizes, locally and from the oil industry. In 2012 he was awarded the Lyse Research Award and in 2013 the Sparebank 1 SR-Bank prize for innovations.

== Some publications ==
- Malcolm A. Kelland; Thor M. Svartaas; Jorunn Øvsthus; Takashi Namba (2000). A new class of kinetic hydrate inhibitor (PDF) (Technical report). Rogalandsforskning. Archived from the original (PDF) on 2014-07-26.
- Kelland, Malcolm (2009). Production Chemicals for the Oil and Gas Industry. CRC Press. ISBN 9781420092974.
