= RealTimeWWII =

History Twitter account (2011–)

@RealTimeWWII
- Website type: Twitter account
- Available in: English
- Owner: Alwyn Collinson
- Creator: Alwyn Collinson
- Website: twitter.com/RealTimeWWII
- Launched: August 2011; 15 years ago
- Current status: Last posted on 9 December 2025

@RealTimeWWII is a Twitter feed describing the events of World War II, created by British historian and Oxford graduate Alwyn Collinson (born 1987).

Collinson began the feed in late August 2011, to coincide with the start of World War II with the German Invasion of Poland in September 1939. He has tweeted the events of the war as they happened on each date and time exactly 72 years earlier. The feed has over 500,000 followers and has received worldwide media attention.

Collinson has described his project as a method of helping people understand history in real terms, rather than statistics, once stating it's about "turning numbers back into people." He has lectured and given interviews on the project. The project runs without advertising

Collinson concluded the project in August 2017, but resumed tweeting again from 1939 on 1 September. Since 9 December 2025, the account has not posted.
