= Review of International Law and Politics =

- Discipline: International relations, Law
- Language: English

Publication details
- History: 2004–present
- Frequency: Quarterly

Standard abbreviations
- ISO 4: Rev. Int. Law Politics

Links
- Journal homepage

Review of International Law and Politics (Turkish: Uluslararası Hukuk ve Politika) is a quarterly peer-reviewed law journal that was established in 2004. It is published by the International Strategic Research Organization.

The journal publishes scholarly articles and book reviews in English, German, and Turkish. It focuses on international law and international relations, but also covers area studies (Balkans, Caucasus, Europe, Central Asia, etc.), international security, sociology, and anthropology in general from all over the world. The journal encourages interdisciplinary studies.

== Indexing and abstracting ==
The journal is abstracted and indexed in:

- HeinOnline
- International Bibliography of the Social Sciences
- International Sociological Abstracts
- IPSA
- Linguistics and Language Behavior Abstracts
- PAIS International
- Social Services Abstracts
- Worldwide Political Science Abstracts
