= Archie Kalokerinos =

Australian physician

- Born: Archivides Kalokerinos; 28 September 1927; Glen Innes, New South Wales
- Died: 1 March 2012 (aged 84); Sydney, Australia
- Occupation: Physician
- Known for: Megavitamin therapy Anti-vaccination activism

Archivides "Archie" Kalokerinos (28 September 1927 – 1 March 2012) was an Australian physician and anti-vaccination advocate. He advocated alternative medicine, including orthomolecular medicine and a form of megavitamin therapy in which high doses of vitamin C are used. He became notable for treating indigenous Australians with a ”counter intuitive” therapy: high intravenous doses of vitamin C, a treatment generally used for patients with severe or subclinical scurvy (not treatable with daily oral intake), but criticized for not being supported by evidence-based medicine, although it brought the infant mortality rate there down to zero.

== Early life ==
Archivides Kalokerinos was born in Glen Innes, Australia, on 28 September 1927. He earned his MB BS degree from Sydney University in 1951 and then spent six years in England. He held the position of medical superintendent at a hospital in Collarenebri, New South Wales.

== Anti-vaccination activism ==
Kalokerinos was affiliated with Australian Vaccination Network, an anti-vaccination lobbyist group. As a speaker for the group, Kalokerinos spread numerous conspiracy theories about vaccines, including that vaccines were used to spread HIV/AIDS in Nigeria as part of a deliberate genocide perpetrated by the World Health Organization and the Save The Children Fund, that they were used by the Australian government to kill a large number of Aboriginal Australians, and that the United States planned to exterminate criminals by encouraging them to get vaccinated. He has said that the deliberate mass killings perpetrated by the World Health Organization and the Save The Children Fund "put Hitler and Stalin in the shade". None of these claims are supported by scientific evidence.

== Publications ==
Books

- Vitamin C Nature's Miraculous Healing Missile!, G. Dettman, A. Kalokerinos, Ashgate Publishing (1993) ISBN 0-646-11985-0
- Every Second Child Archie Kalokerinos (foreword by Linus Pauling), Keats Publishing (1981) ISBN 0-87983-250-9
- Alcohol and Australian Aborigines, A. Kalokerinos, Aboriginal Medical Service Information Service, Redfern, NSW (1977) ISBN 0-959-69092-1
- Ascorbic acid, the eye, diabetes and herpes, A. Kalokerinos, Aboriginal Medical Service Information Service, Redfern, NSW (1977) ISBN 0-959-69090-5

Journal articles

- Kalokerinos, A; Dettman, I; Dettman, G (March 1983). "Is calcium ascorbate preferable to sodium ascorbate?". Australas Nurses J. 12: 9. PMID 6555033.
- Kalokerinos, A; Dettman, I; Dettman, G (July 1982). "How much vitamin C should I take". Australas Nurses J. 11: 8–9. PMID 6924854.
- Kalokerinos, A; Dettman, I; Dettman, G (March 1982). "Ascorbate--the proof of the pudding! A selection of case histories responding to ascorbate". Australas Nurses J. 11: 18–21. PMID 6920272.
- Kalokerinos, A; Dettman, G (November 1981). "Rubella immunisation, a tangle of absurdities and some comments". Australas Nurses J. 10: 3–6. PMID 6917758.
- Kalokerinos, A; Dettman, G (October 1981). "On your metal? Amazing zinc!". Australas Nurses J. 10. PMID 6915775.
- Kalokerinos, A; Dettman, G (June 1981). ""Mumps" the word but you have yet another vaccine deficiency". Australas Nurses J. 10: 17–8. PMID 6914174.
- Kalokerinos, A; Dettman, I; Dettman, G (March 1981). "Vitamin C: the dangers of calcium and safety of sodium ascorbate". Australas Nurses J. 10. PMID 6910420.
- Dettman, G; Kalokerinos, A (December 1980). "Aboriginal health: the gentle art of deception". Australas Nurses J. 10: 14–5. PMID 6908523.
- Kalokerinos, A; Dettman, G (August 1980). "Viral vaccines vital or vulnerable". Australas Nurses J. 9: 27–32. PMID 6904225.
- Kalokerinos, A; Dettman, G (July 1980). "Joggers - beware". Australas Nurses J. 9. PMID 6904216.
- Cilento, P; Kalokerinos, A; Dettman, I; Dettman, G (May 1980). "Venomous bites and vitamin C status". Australas Nurses J. 9: 19. PMID 6902663.
- Knafelc, D; Kalokerinos, A; Dettmann, G (1980). "Disease etiology - a shock therapy". Australas Nurses J. 9: 18–20. PMID 6770812.
- Kalokerinos, A; Dettman, G (November 1979). "On new ideas and an U.S. experience". Australas Nurses J. 9: 22–6. PMID 119534.
- Kalokerinos, A; Dettman, G (March 1979). "Year of the child: don't be beguiled". Australas Nurses J. 8: 22–4. PMID 110305.
- Kalokerinos, A; Dettman, G (July 1978). "Vaccines: "who" benefits?". Australas Nurses J. 7: 15–6. PMID 100089.
- Kalokerinos, A; Dettman, G (May 1978). "Does rubella vaccine protect?". Australas Nurses J. 7: 1–4. PMID 96796.
- Kalokerinos, A (March 1978). "The sudden infant death syndrome. Part 2. Definition. Further clinical observations". Australas Nurses J. 7: 6–8. PMID 418773.
- Kalokerinos, A (1977). "Australian Aboriginal health and vitamin C". Australas Nurses J. 7: 7. PMID 415724.
- Kalokerinos, A; Dettman, G (October 1977). "Vitamin C and the significance of that "wasted spillover"". Australas Nurses J. 7: 19. PMID 244300.
- Kalokerinos, A (1977). "Aboriginal health". Australas Nurses J. 7: 23–4, 30. PMID 243449.
- Kalokerinos, A; Dettman, G (April 1977). "The efficiency of immunisations". Australas Nurses J. 6: 15. PMID 587083.
- Kalokerinos, A; Dettman, G (July 1976). "Sudden death in infancy syndrome in Western Australia". Med. J. Aust. 2: 31–2. PMID 979792.
- Kalokerinos, A (April 1976). "Letter: Severe measles in Vietnam". Med. J. Aust. 1: 593–4. PMID 933962.
- Kalokerinos, A (April 1974). "Poor black health, bad white attitudes". Aust Nurses J. 3: 29–31. PMID 4499636.
- Kalokerinos, A (March 1973). "Aboriginal infant health and mortality rates". Med. J. Aust. 1: 462–3. PMID 4708934.
- Kalokerinos, A (August 1971). "The Aboriginal infant mortality rate". Med. J. Aust. 2: 445–6. PMID 5122440.
- Kalokerinos, A (January 1969). "Some aspects of aboriginal infant mortality". Med. J. Aust. 1: 185–7. PMID 5779047.
- Bryson, AM; Kalokerinos, A (August 1970). "Sudden unexpected deaths in infancy". Med. J. Aust. 2: 292. PMID 5456573.

== See also ==
- Vaccine hesitancy
