= Charles Frosst =

Canadian businessman

Charles Edward Frosst (1867–1948) was a Canadian businessman who founded the pharmaceutical company Charles E. Frosst & Co. in 1899 which was acquired by Merck & Co. in 1965 to become Merck Frosst Canada Inc.

Charles Frosst is interred in the Mount Royal Cemetery in Montreal.
