= Simon Swain =

- Title: Pro-Vice-Chancellor

Academic background
- Education: Oxford University

Academic work
- Discipline: Classics
- Sub-discipline: Greek culture under Rome
- Institutions: Warwick University

Simon Charles Robert Swain, FBA, is a classicist and academic. Since 2000, he has been Professor of Classics at the University of Warwick, where he has also been Pro-Vice-Chancellor for Arts and Social Sciences since 2014.

== Career ==
Simon Charles Robert Swain completed his undergraduate degree in classics (BA) at Pembroke College, Oxford, graduating in 1984. He then moved to Wolfson College, Oxford, as a doctoral student; his DPhil was awarded in 1987 for his thesis "Plutarch and Rome: three studies". He was a post-doctoral fellow at All Souls College, Oxford, from 1990 to 1995 and then joined the University of Warwick as a research fellow (at All Souls, he was elected a Fifty-Pound Fellow in 1995 but left the governing body in 2010, becoming a Quondam Fellow). He was promoted to a senior lecturership at Warwick in 1997 and since 2000 has been Professor of Classics there. He was also head of the Department of Classics and Ancient History from 2000 to 2007, and served as deputy chair (2005–07) and then chair (2011–14) of the Faculty of Arts. He was appointed Pro-Vice-Chancellor for Arts and Social Sciences at Warwick in 2014.

According to the British Academy, Swain's research focuses on the "culture and history of the Greek world under Rome", the "history of medicine in antiquity and the middle ages", and "the legacy of Greek thought in medieval Islam".

== Honours and awards ==
In 2015, Swain was elected a Fellow of the British Academy, the United Kingdom's national academy for the humanities and social sciences.

== Selected publications ==
- (Editor) Economy, Family, and Society from Rome to Islam. A Critical Edition, English Translation, and Study of Bryson's "Management of the Estate" (Cambridge University Press, 2013).
- (Editor) Themistius, Julian, and Greek Political Theory under Rome. Texts, Translations, and Studies of Four Key Works (Cambridge University Press, 2013).
- (Editor) Seeing the Face, Seeing the Soul: Polemon’s Physiognomy from Classical Antiquity to Medieval Islam (Oxford University Press, 2007).
- (Co-edited with Jaś Elsner and Stephen J. Harrison) Severan Culture (Cambridge University Press, 2007).
- (Co-edited with Mark J. Edwards) Approaching Late Antiquity: The Transformation from Early to Late Empire (Oxford University Press, 2004).
- (Co-edited with James N. Adams and Mark Janse) Bilingualism in Ancient Society (Oxford University Press, 2002).
- (Edited) Dio Chrysostom: Politics, Letters, and Philosophy (Oxford University Press, 2000).
- (Edited) Oxford Readings in the Greek Novel, Oxford Readings in Classical Studies series (Oxford University Press, 1999).
- (Co-edited with Mark J. Edwards) Portraits: Biographical Representation in the Greek and Latin Literature of the Roman Empire (Clarendon Press, 1997).
- Hellenism and Empire: Language, Classicism and Power in the Greek World, AD 50–250 (Clarendon Press, 1996).
