= John Ward =

John Ward may refer to:

== Academia ==
- John Ward (academic) (1679–1758), English Gresham Professor of Rhetoric
- John Ward (geologist) (1837–1906), British palaeontologist and icthycologist
- John Clive Ward (1924–2000), British physicist
- John Manning Ward (1919–1990), Vice-Chancellor and history professor at the University of Sydney
- John Mason Ward (1921–2014), British chemist
- John Milton Ward IV (1917–2011), musicologist and Professor of Music at Harvard University
- John Sebastian Marlowe Ward (1885–1949), British historian, freemason and spiritualist
- John William Ward (professor) (1922–1985), professor of English and history, and president of Amherst College

== Arts ==
- John Ward (actor) (1704–1773), English actor
- John Ward (American actor) (1923–1995), American actor
- John Ward (composer) (1590–1638), English composer
- John Ward (painter) (1798–1849), English marine artist
- John Ward (potter) (1938–2023), British potter
- John Powell Ward (born 1937), English poet and academic
- John Quincy Adams Ward (1830–1910), American sculptor
- John Stanton Ward (1917–2007), English painter
- Johnny Ward (actor) (born 1987), Irish actor
- Johnny Ward (travel blogger) (born 1983), Irish world traveller

== Military ==
- John Ward (American soldier) (1848–1911), American Indian Wars soldier and Medal of Honor recipient
- John Ward (RAF officer) (1918–1995), British airman, member of Polish resistance during Warsaw Uprising
- John Hubert Ward (1870–1938), British army officer and courtier

== Public officials ==
- John Ward (1779–1855), British Member of Parliament for Leominster
- John Ward, 1st Earl of Dudley (1781–1833), British statesman, 1st Earl of Dudley
- John Ward, 1st Viscount Dudley and Ward (1704–1774), British peer and politician
- John Ward, 2nd Viscount Dudley and Ward (1725–1788), British peer and politician
- John Ward (banker) (c. 1650–1726), British MP, Lord Mayor of London, Governor of the Bank of England
- John Ward (Conservative politician) (1925–2010), Conservative MP for Poole, 1979–1997
- John Ward (diplomat, died 1890) (1805–1890), British diplomat in Germany
- John Ward (economist) (born 1942), British trade unionist and opera administrator
- John Ward (loyalist) (1753–1846), businessman and politician in New Brunswick
- John Ward (Minnesota politician) (born 1950), retired educator and member of the Minnesota House of Representatives
- John Ward (South Carolina politician) (1767–1816), intendent (mayor) of Charleston, South Carolina, 1801–1802
- John Ward (trade unionist) (1866–1934), English politician, trade union leader and soldier
- John Elliott Ward (1814–1902), American diplomat and politician
- John F. Ward (1904–1973), Speaker of the Maine House of Representatives and President of the Maine Senate
- John Guthrie Ward (1909–1991), British ambassador to Argentina and Italy
- John M. Ward (1865–1948), Member of the Maine House of Representatives
- Sir John MacQueen Ward (born 1940), Scottish businessman
- T. John Ward (born 1943), United States federal judge, Eastern District of Texas
- John Ward (died 1501), Lord Mayor of London buried in St Paul's Cathedral

== Religion ==
- John Ward (archbishop of Cardiff) (1929–2007), Roman Catholic Archbishop of Cardiff, 1983–2001
- John Ward (auxiliary bishop of Los Angeles) (1920–2011), Roman Catholic auxiliary bishop in Los Angeles
- John Ward (bishop of Leavenworth) (1857–1929), Roman Catholic Bishop of Leavenworth, 1911–1929
- John Ward (priest) (1779–1860), English Anglican Dean of Lincoln
- John Ward (prophet) (1781–1837), Irish preacher and prophet
- John Ward (vicar) (1629–1681), English vicar of Stratford-upon-Avon
- John C. Ward (1873–1949), bishop of the Episcopal Diocese of Erie

== Sports ==
=== Cricket ===
- John Ward (cricketer, born 1946) (born 1946), Australian cricketer
- John Ward (Derbyshire cricketer) (born 1948), English cricketer for Derbyshire
- John Ward (Hampshire cricketer) (active 1877), English cricketer for Hampshire
- John Ward (Kent cricketer) (active 1800–1806), English cricketer in Kent
- John Ward (New Zealand cricketer) (1937–2021), New Zealand cricketer
- John Ward (umpire) (born 1962), Australian cricket umpire

=== Other sports ===
- John Ward (1920s footballer) (active 1925–26), English footballer
- John Ward (American football, born 1907) (1907–1968), American football player and coach
- John Ward (American football, born 1948) (1948–2012), American football player
- John Ward (Australian footballer) (1928–2017), Australian rules footballer
- John Ward (broadcaster) (1930–2018), American radio broadcaster
- John Ward (footballer, born 1951) (born 1951), English footballer and manager
- John Ward (outfielder) (active 1884), American baseball outfielder
- John Ward (pitcher) (1862–1899), American baseball pitcher
- John Ward (rugby) (1873–1939), English rugby player
- John Montgomery Ward (1860–1925), American baseball player
- John T. Ward Jr. (1945–2021), American horse trainer
- Johnny Ward (rugby league) (c. 1941–2019), English rugby player
- Jay Ward (baseball) (John Francis Ward, 1938–2012), American baseball player and coach

== Other ==
- John Ralph Hansford Ward, known as Hansford Ward (1817–1903), also his son with the same name, ship owners and captains of South Australia

== See also ==
- Death of John Ward, Irish traveller shot dead in 2004
- Jack Ward (c. 1553–1622), English pirate and Barbary corsair
- Jonathan Ward (disambiguation)
- John Warde (disambiguation)
