= Steven Gunn (historian) =

English historian and academic

Steven Gunn FRHistS
- Born: Steven John Gunn
- Occupations: Historian and academic
- Title: Professor of Early Modern History
- Board member of: Royal Armouries
- Children: 2

Academic background
- Education: Whitgift School
- Alma mater: Merton College, Oxford
- Thesis: The life and career of Charles Brandon, Duke of Suffolk, c. 1484-1545 (1986)
- Doctoral advisor: C. S. L. Davies

Academic work
- Discipline: History
- Sub-discipline: Early modern Britain; English Reformation
- Institutions: Newcastle University; Merton College, Oxford
- Doctoral students: Yuval Noah Harari

Steven John Gunn FRHistS is an English historian and fellow of Merton College, University of Oxford. He teaches and researches the history of late medieval and early modern Britain and Europe, and is the author of a number of academic texts.

== Biography ==
Gunn was an undergraduate and doctoral student at Merton College, Oxford, matriculating in 1979. Prior to this he attended the Whitgift School in South Croydon. Gunn's doctoral thesis, a study of the life and career of Charles Brandon, 1st Duke of Suffolk, was supervised by C. S. L. Davies and completed in 1986. Prior to being elected a Tutorial Fellow at his alma mater, Gunn held a research fellowship at Newcastle University.

Gunn's research interests lie in the political, social, cultural and military history of England and its European neighbours, spanning the mid-fifteenth to the late sixteenth century.

Gunn was awarded the Title of Distinction of Professor of Early Modern History by the University of Oxford in October 2015.

Gunn delivered the 2015 James Ford Lectures in British History at the University of Oxford, taking as his subject 'The English people at war in the age of Henry VIII'. A book of the same title based on the lectures was published in 2018.

Between 2018 and 2019 Gunn served as Acting Warden of Merton College in the period between the retirement of Martin J. Taylor and the arrival of his successor, Irene Tracey. He had previously served as Sub-Warden from 2010 to 2012.

In 2021 Gunn was appointed to the board of trustees of the Royal Armouries by Oliver Dowden, the Secretary of State for Digital, Culture, Media and Sport, serving a four-year term. He was reappointed for a second four-year term by Lisa Nandy in 2025.

== Media work ==
Gunn has appeared as a panelist on two editions of the BBC Radio 4 programme In Our Time, discussing the Field of the Cloth of Gold in 2005 and the Battle of Bosworth Field in 2012. In 2008 he appeared on Great Lives discussing Henry VII with George Osborne. In 2009 he appeared on an episode of the Radio 4 series The Hidden Henry discussing Henry VIII's intellectual development and scholarly ambitions with Andrea Clarke. In June 2025 Gunn appeared in an episode of Suzannah Lipscomb's podcast Not Just the Tudors discussing his book An Accidental History of Tudor England alongside his co-author Tomasz Gromelski. He has also contributed articles to the magazine History Today and appeared as an expert commentator in the 2018 mockumentary series Cunk on Britain.

== Personal life ==
Gunn is married to Jacquie, and together they have two daughters.

== Selected publications ==
- Charles Brandon, Duke of Suffolk, c.1484–1545 (Oxford: Basil Blackwell, 1988)
- Cardinal Wolsey: Church, State and Art (co-editor with Phillip Lindley; Cambridge: Cambridge University Press, 1991)
- Early Tudor Government, 1485–1558 (Basingstoke: Macmillan Publishers, 1995)
- Authority and Consent in Tudor England: Essays Presented to C. S. L. Davies (co-editor with George W. Bernard; Aldershot: Ashgate Publishing, 2002)
- The Court as a Stage: England and the Low Countries in the Later Middle Ages (co-editor with Antheun Janse; Woodbridge: Boydell & Brewer, 2006)
- War, State, and Society in England and the Netherlands, 1477–1559 (co-authored with Hans Cools and David Grummitt; Oxford: Oxford University Press, 2007)
- Arthur Tudor, Prince of Wales: Life, Death and Commemoration, (co-editor with Linda Monckton; Woodbridge: Boydell & Brewer, 2009)
- Treasures of Merton College (editor; London: Third Millennium Publishing, 2013)
- Charles Brandon: Henry VIII's Closest Friend (Stroud: Amberley Publishing, 2015)
- Henry VII’s New Men and the Making of Tudor England (Oxford: Oxford University Press, 2016)
- The English People at War in the Age of Henry VIII (Oxford: Oxford University Press, 2018)
- An Accidental History of Tudor England: From Daily Life to Sudden Death (co-authored with Tomasz Gromelski; London: John Murray, 2025)

== See also ==
- Roger Highfield
- John Roberts
- Philip Waller
- Robert Gildea
