= List of wardens of Merton College, Oxford =

This is a list of Wardens of Merton College, Oxford.

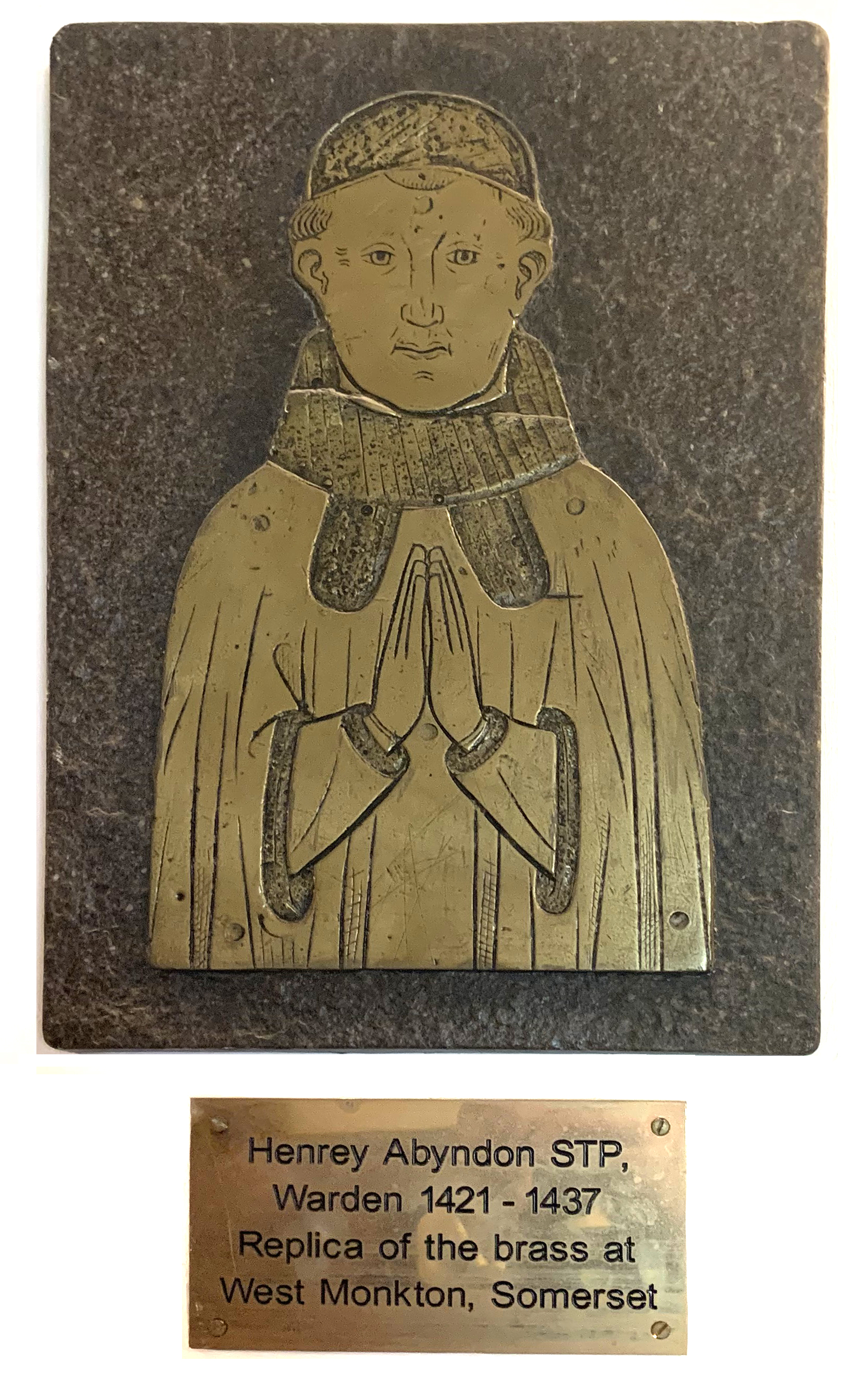
Henrey Abyndon, Warden of Merton 1421-1437

- Peter of Abingdon, 1264–86
- Richard Werplysdon, 1286–95
- John de la More, 1295–99
- John de Wantynge, 1299–1328
- Robert Trenge, 1328–51
- William Durant, 1351–75
- John Bloxham, 1375–87
- John Wendover, 1387–98
- Edmund Bekyngham, 1398–1416
- Thomas Rodebourne, 1416–17
- Robert Gilbert, 1417–21
- Henry Abyndon, 1421–37
- Elias Holcot, 1437–55
- Henry Sever, 1455–71
- John Gigur, 1471–82
- Richard Fitzjames, 1482–1507
- Thomas Harper, 1507–08
- Richard Rawlins, 1508–21
- Roland Philips, 1521–25
- John Chambers, 1525–44
- Henry Tindall, 1544–45
- Thomas Reynolds, 1545–59
- James Gervase, 1559–62
- John Man, 1562–69
- Thomas Bickley, 1569–85
- Henry Savile, 1585–1621
- Nathaniel Brent, 1621–45
- William Harvey, 1645–46
- Nathaniel Brent, 1646–51
- Jonathan Goddard, 1651–60
- Edward Reynolds, 1660–61
- Thomas Clayton, 1661–93
- Richard Lydall, 1693–1704
- Edmund Martin, 1704–09
- John Holland, 1709–34
- Robert Wyntle, 1734–50
- John Robinson, 1750–59
- Henry Barton, 1759–90
- Scrope Berdmore, 1790–1810
- Peter Vaughan, 1810–26
- Robert Bullock Marsham, 1826–80
- George Charles Brodrick, 1881–1903
- Thomas Bowman, 1904–36
- John Charles Miles, 1936–47
- Geoffrey Reginald Gilchrist Mure, 1947–63
- Robin Harrison, 1963–69
- Sir Rex Richards, 1969–84
- John M. Roberts, 1984–94
- Dame Jessica Rawson, 1994–2010
- Sir Martin J. Taylor, 2010–2018
- Steven Gunn (acting), 2018–2019
- Irene Tracey, 2019–22
- Jennifer Payne, 2023–present

== See also ==
- Merton College, Oxford
- List of alumni of Merton College, Oxford
