= Cultural history =

Field of history

Cultural history records and interprets events in human history with respect to the contemporaneous social, cultural and political milieu, arts, and manners. Jacob Burckhardt (1818–1897) helped found cultural history as a discipline. Cultural history studies and interprets the record of human societies by identifying the distinctive ways of living developed by the group under consideration. Cultural history involves the aggregate of past cultural activity, such as ceremony, class practices, and interactions with locales. It combines the approaches of anthropology and history to examine popular cultural traditions and cultural interpretations of historical experience.

== Description ==
Many current cultural historians claim it is a new approach, but cultural history was already used by nineteenth-century historians, notably the Swiss scholar of Renaissance history Jacob Burckhardt.

Cultural history overlaps in its approaches with the French movements of histoire des mentalités (Philippe Poirrier, 2004) and the so-called new history, and in the U.S., it is closely associated with the field of American studies. As originally conceived and practiced in the 19th century by Burckhardt, in relation to the Italian Renaissance, cultural history was oriented to the study of a particular historical period in its entirety, with regard not only to its painting, sculpture, and architecture, but to the economic basis underpinning society, and to the social institutions of its daily life. Echoes of Burkhardt's approach in the 20th century can be seen in Johan Huizinga's The Waning of the Middle Ages (1919).

Most often the focus is on phenomena shared by non-elite groups in a society, such as: carnival, festival, and public rituals; performance traditions of tale, epic, and other verbal forms; cultural evolutions in human relations (ideas, sciences, arts, techniques); and cultural expressions of social movements such as nationalism. Cultural history also examines main historical concepts as power, ideology, class, culture, cultural identity, attitude, race, perception and new historical methods as narration of body. Many studies consider adaptations of traditional culture to mass media (television, radio, newspapers, magazines, posters, etc.), from print to film and, now, to the Internet (culture of capitalism). Its modern approaches come from art history, Annales, Marxist school, microhistory and new cultural history.

Common theoretical touchstones for recent cultural history have included: Jürgen Habermas's formulation of the public sphere in The Structural Transformation of the Bourgeois Public Sphere; Clifford Geertz's notion of 'thick description' (expounded in The Interpretation of Cultures); and the idea of memory as a cultural-historical category, as discussed in Paul Connerton's How Societies Remember.

=== Historiography and the French Revolution ===
The area where new-style cultural history is often pointed to as being almost a paradigm is the "revisionist" history of the French Revolution, dated somewhere since François Furet's massively influential 1978 essay Interpreting the French Revolution. The "revisionist interpretation" is often characterized as replacing the allegedly dominant, allegedly Marxist, "social interpretation" which locates the causes of the Revolution in class dynamics. The revisionist approach has tended to put more emphasis on "political culture". Reading ideas of political culture through Habermas' conception of the public sphere, historians of the Revolution in the past few decades have looked at the role and position of cultural themes such as gender, ritual, and ideology in the context of pre-revolutionary French political culture.

Historians who might be grouped under this umbrella are Roger Chartier, Robert Darnton, Patrice Higonnet, Lynn Hunt, Keith Baker, Joan Landes, Mona Ozouf, and Sarah Maza. Of course, these scholars all pursue fairly diverse interests, and perhaps too much emphasis has been placed on the paradigmatic nature of the new history of the French Revolution. Colin Jones, for example, is no stranger to cultural history, Habermas, or Marxism, and has persistently argued that the Marxist interpretation is not dead, but can be revivified; after all, Habermas' logic was heavily indebted to a Marxist understanding. Meanwhile, Rebecca Spang has also recently argued that for all its emphasis on difference and newness, the 'revisionist' approach retains the idea of the French Revolution as a watershed in the history of (so-called) modernity and that the problematic notion of modernity has itself attracted scant attention.

== Cultural studies ==
Cultural studies is an academic discipline popular among a diverse group of scholars. It combines political economy, geography, sociology, social theory, literary theory, film/video studies, cultural anthropology, philosophy, and art history/criticism to study cultural phenomena in various societies. Cultural studies researchers often concentrate on how a particular phenomenon relates to matters of ideology, nationality, ethnicity, social class, and/or gender. The term was coined by Richard Hoggart in 1964 when he founded the Birmingham Centre for Contemporary Cultural Studies. It has since become strongly associated with Stuart Hall, who succeeded Hoggart as Director.

== Cultural history in popular culture ==
The BBC has produced and broadcast many educational television programmes on different aspects of human cultural history: in 1969 Civilisation, in 1973 The Ascent of Man, in 1985 The Triumph of the West and in 2012 Andrew Marr's History of the World.

== See also ==
- Collective unconscious
- Ethnohistory
- History of mentalities
- Human history
