= Scrope Berdmore (academic) =

English academic administrator

Scrope Berdmore (23 November 1744 – 16 December 1814) was an English academic administrator at the University of Oxford.

Berdmore was elected Warden (head) of Merton College, Oxford in 1790, a post he held until 1810. While Warden at Merton College, Berdmore was also Vice-Chancellor of Oxford University from 1796 until 1797.

Academic offices
Preceded by Henry Barton	Warden of Merton College, Oxford; 1790–1810	Succeeded by Peter Vaughan
Preceded by John Wills	Vice-Chancellor of Oxford University; 1796–1797	Succeeded by Edmund Isham
