= Phil Waller =

Phil Waller may refer to:

- Phil Waller (rugby union)
- Phil Waller (footballer)

== See also ==
- Philip Waller, English historian
