= George Burke =

George Burke may refer to:

- George Burke (cricketer) (1847–1920), English cricketer
- George Thew Burke (1776–1854), soldier, merchant and political figure in Upper Canada
- George J. Burke (1886–1950), judge during the Nuremberg Trials
- George Burke Jr. (1917–1947), suspect in murders of Betty Binnicker and Mary Thames
