= Jessica Rawson =

British art historian and sinologist (born 1943)

Dame Jessica Mary Rawson DBE FBA

Warden of Merton College, Oxford
- In office 1994–2010
- Preceded by: J. M. Roberts
- Succeeded by: Sir Martin Taylor

Personal details
- Born: 20 January 1943 (age 83)

Academic background
- Education: New Hall, Cambridge; University of London

Academic work
- Discipline: Art history and Sinology
- Sub-discipline: Chinese art; archaeology of China; Inner Asia; early Chinese material culture; cultural ecology; ornament
- Institutions: British Museum; Merton College, Oxford; St John's College, Cambridge

Dame Jessica Mary Rawson, DBE FBA (born 20 January 1943) is an English art historian, curator and sinologist, specialising in Chinese art. She is also an academic administrator.

After many years at the British Museum, she was Warden (head) of Merton College, Oxford, from 1994 until her retirement in 2010. She served as pro-vice-chancellor at University of Oxford from 2006 for a term of five years.

== Biography ==
Rawson's academic background is in Sinology with a particular research focus on the cosmology of the Han period (206 BC-AD 220) and its relation to tombs and their decoration. Educated at St Paul's Girls' School in Hammersmith, West London, New Hall, Cambridge and the University of London, Rawson began her career in the civil service.

Between 1976 and 1994, she served as Deputy Keeper and then Keeper of the Department of Oriental Antiquities at the British Museum. From 1994 to 2010 she was Warden of Merton College, Oxford, and from 2006 to 2011 she served as pro-vice-chancellor of Oxford University. She has been involved in a number of high-profile exhibitions such as the Mysteries of Ancient China.

Rawson contributed with Evelyn S. Rawski and other scholars to the catalogue of China: The Three Emperors by Frances Wood. The exhibition ran at the Royal Academy of Arts in 2005–06.

From 2011 to 2016, Rawson headed a project at the University of Oxford on China and Inner Asia: Interactions Which Changed China (1000-200 BC) funded by the Leverhulme Trust, with Jianjun Mei as collaborator. This project explored relations between Ancient China and peoples of the Eurasian Steppes, particularly to the north and north-west. As of 2015, Rawson was also listed as a project partner on the RLAHA project FLow of Ancient Metals across Eurasia (FLAME) funded by the European Research Council.

== Honours ==
Rawson is a Fellow of the British Academy, a member of the Scholars' Council of the Kluge Center at the Library of Congress and a member of the Art Fund's Advisory Council. She was made a Commander of the Order of the British Empire (CBE) in the 1994 Birthday Honours and advanced Dame Commander of the Order of the British Empire (DBE) in the 2002 New Year Honours for services to oriental studies.

In 2012, Rawson was elected to the American Academy of Arts and Sciences as a Foreign Honorary Member.

In May 2017 she was awarded the Charles Lang Freer Medal in recognition of her lifetime's contribution to the study of Chinese art and archaeology. In 2022 she received the Tang Prize in Sinology.

== Personal life ==
Rawson is married with one daughter.

== Bibliography ==
- Chinese pots 7th-13th century AD (1977) London: British Museum Publications.
- Ancient China, art and archaeology (1980) London: British Museum Publications.
- The Chinese Bronzes of Yunnan (1983) London and Beijing: Sidgwick and Jackson.
- Chinese ornament: The lotus and the dragon (1984) London: British Museum Publications
- Chinese bronzes: Art and ritual (1987) London: Published for the Trustees of the British Museum in association with the Sainsbury Centre for Visual Arts, University of East Anglia.
- Chinese jade from the Neolithic to the Qing (1995) London: British Museum Press.
- Mysteries of Ancient China (1996) London: British Museum Press.
- China: The Three Emperors, 1662-1795 (2005) London: Royal Academy of Arts.
- The British Museum Book of Chinese Art (2 ed.). British Museum Press. 2007.
- "Miniature Bronzes from Western Zhou tombs at Baoji in Shaanxi Province". Radiance between Bronzes and Jades—Archaeology, Art and Culture of the Shang and Zhou Dynasties. Taipei: Institute of History and Philology, Academia Sinica. 2013. pp. 23–66.
- "Ordering the exotic: ritual practices in the Late Western and Early Eastern Zhou". Artibus Asiae. 73 (1): 5–76. 2013.
- Rawson, J. (2017). "Shimao and Erlitou: new perspectives on the origins of the bronze industry in central China". Antiquity. 91 (355). doi:10.15184/aqy.2016.234.

Academic offices
Preceded by John Roberts	Warden of Merton College, Oxford; 1994–2010	Succeeded by Martin J. Taylor
