= Myles Allen =

British climatologist (born 1965)

Myles Allen CBE FRS FInstP
- Born: Myles Robert Allen; 11 August 1965 (age 61); Farnham, Surrey, England
- Education: British School in the Netherlands; University of Oxford (MA, DPhil)
- Known for: Climateprediction.net
- Spouse: Irene Tracey (m. 1994)
- Awards: Edward Appleton Medal and Prize (2010)
- Scientific career
- Fields: Climate change
- Workplaces: United Nations Environment Programme; Rutherford Appleton Laboratory; Massachusetts Institute of Technology; University of Oxford
- Thesis: Interactions between the atmosphere and oceans on time scales of weeks to years (1992)
- Website: www.oxfordmartin.ox.ac.uk/people/myles-allen

Myles Robert Allen CBE FRS FInstP (born 11 August 1965) is an English climate scientist. He is Professor of Geosystem Science in the University of Oxford's School of Geography and the Environment, and head of the Atmospheric, Oceanic and Planetary Physics Department.

== Education ==
Allen was educated at the British School in the Netherlands and the University of Oxford where he was awarded a Master of Arts degree in physics and philosophy in 1987 followed by a Doctor of Philosophy degree in 1992. He was a student of St. John's College, Oxford.

== Career ==
As well as his position as Professor of Geosystem science at Oxford, he is the Principal Investigator of the distributed computing project Climateprediction.net (which makes use of computing resources provided voluntarily by the general public), and was principally responsible for starting this project. He is the Director of the Oxford Net Zero initiative and a Fellow of Linacre College, Oxford.

Allen has worked at the Energy Unit of the United Nations Environment Programme, the Rutherford Appleton Laboratory in Oxfordshire, and the Massachusetts Institute of Technology. He contributed to the Third Assessment Report of the Intergovernmental Panel on Climate Change as a Lead Author of the Chapter on detection of change and attribution of causes, and was a Review Editor for the chapter on predictions of global climate change for the IPCC Fourth Assessment Report and a co-author of the IPCC October 8, 2018 Special Report on Global Warming of 1.5 °C. His research focuses on the attribution of recent climate change and assessing what these changes mean for global climate simulations of the future.

Allen also provided the technical expertise for the game Fate of the World, which is "a PC strategy game that simulates the real social and environmental impact of global climate change over the next 200 years". In 2015, he mentioned that carbon capture and storage (CCS) should be made mandatory.

== Awards and honours ==
In 2010, Allen was awarded the Edward Appleton Medal and Prize by the Institute of Physics for "his important contributions to the detection and attribution of human influence on climate and quantifying uncertainty in climate predictions". Allen was appointed Commander of the Order of the British Empire (CBE) in the 2022 New Year Honours for services to climate change attribution and prediction and net-zero. He was elected a Fellow of the Royal Society in 2023.

== Personal life ==
Allen married Irene Tracey in 1994 and has three children.
