= Irene Tracey =

British neuroscientist (born 1966)

Irene Tracey CBE FRS FMedSci MAE FRCA
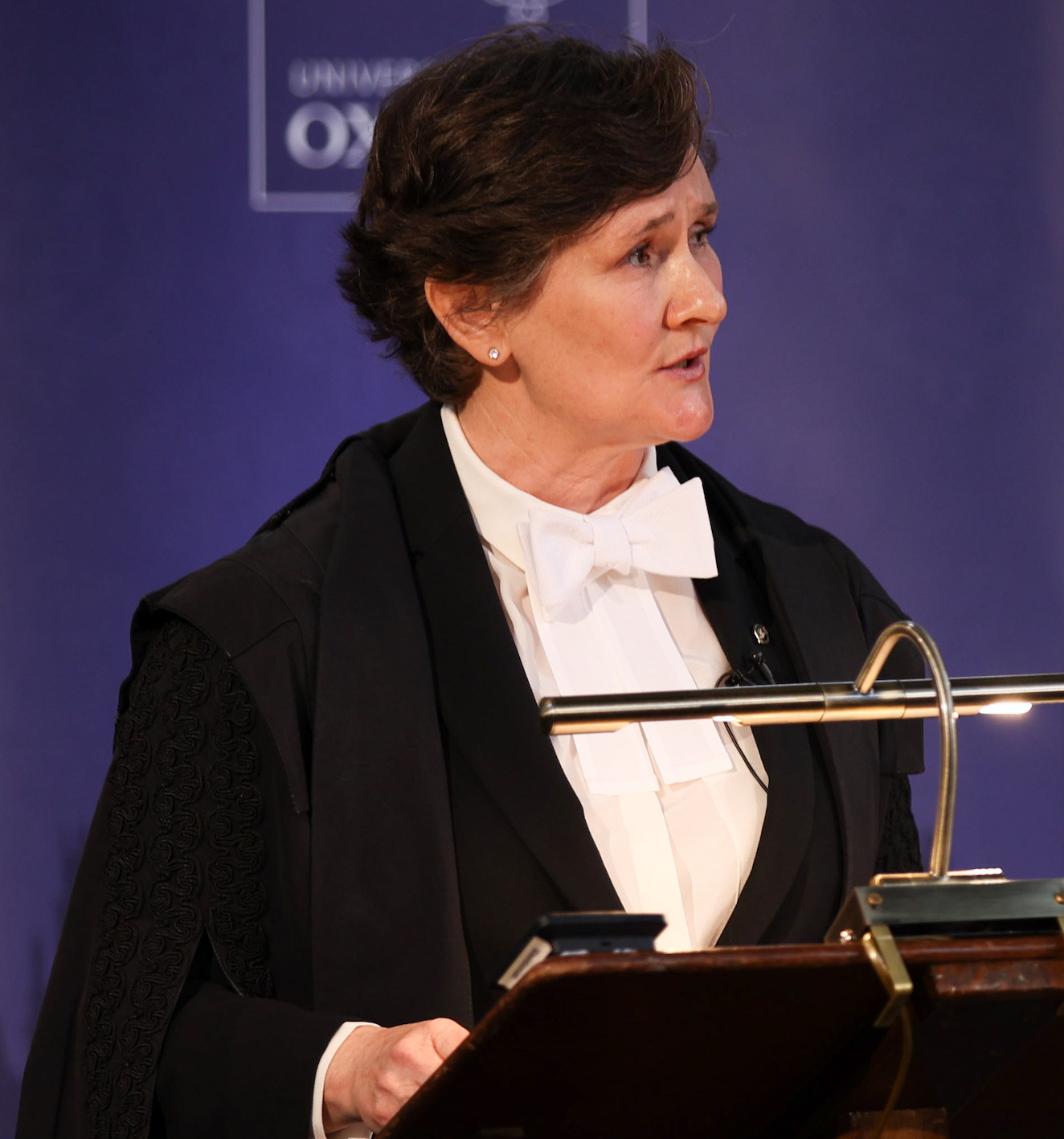
- Tracey's admission speech on becoming Oxford's Vice Chancellor, 2023

Vice Chancellor of the University of Oxford
- Incumbent
- Assumed office 1 January 2023
- Chancellor: Chris Patten; William Hague
- Preceded by: Louise Richardson

Personal details
- Born: Irene Mary Carmel Tracey; 30 October 1966 (age 59) Oxford, England
- Spouse: Myles Allen (m. 1994)
- Children: 3
- Education: Gosford Hill School; University of Oxford (BA, MA, DPhil)
- Awards: Suffrage Science Award (2014); Feldberg Prize (2017)
- Scientific career
- Fields: Neuroscience
- Workplaces: University of Oxford; Harvard University
- Thesis: MRS and Biochemical Studies on Animal Models of Human Disease (1993)
- Doctoral advisor: Jeffrey Dunn
- Website: www.ndcn.ox.ac.uk/team/irene-tracey

Irene Mary Carmel Tracey (born 30 October 1966) is a British neuroscientist who is vice-chancellor of the University of Oxford and former Warden of Merton College, Oxford. She is also professor of anaesthetic neuroscience in the Nuffield Department of Clinical Neurosciences and formerly pro-vice-chancellor (without portfolio) at the University of Oxford. She is a co-founder of the Oxford Centre for Functional Magnetic Resonance Imaging of the Brain (FMRIB), now the University of Oxford Centre for Integrative Neuroimaging. Her team’s research concerns the neuroscience of pain, specifically pain perception and analgesia as well as how anaesthetics produce altered states of consciousness. Her team uses multidisciplinary approaches including neuroimaging.

== Early life and education ==
Tracey was born at the Radcliffe Infirmary in Oxford and educated at St. Thomas More R.C. Primary School and Gosford Hill School in Kidlington. She completed her undergraduate and graduate studies in biochemistry at Merton College, Oxford, where she was supervised by Eric Newsholme and George Radda. She graduated with joint-top first class degree, winning the Gibbs Prize as an undergraduate, and was a Wellcome Trust prize student and senior scholar at Merton College for her graduate work. Her postgraduate research was supervised by Jeffrey F. Dunn and investigated the use of magnetic resonance imaging (MRI) methods to study disease in humans.

== Career ==
As an early career researcher, Tracey held a postdoctoral position at Harvard Medical School, working at the MGH-NMR imaging centre (now Martinos) applying magnetic spectroscopy techniques to understand AIDS Dementia Complex. During this period she became interested in pain, the research field she would eventually focus on. Tracey returned to Oxford in 1997, where she helped to found the Oxford Centre for Functional Magnetic Resonance Imaging of the Brain (FMRIB), later renamed the Wellcome Centre for Integrative Neuroimaging; she served as its Director from 2005 until 2015. She was appointed university lecturer in 2001 at the Department of Physiology, Anatomy and Genetics; during this time, she was also a tutor in medicine and Fellow of Christ Church, Oxford. Between 2007 and 2019, Tracey was Nuffield Chair in Anaesthetic Sciences and a Fellow of Pembroke College, Oxford, where she is now an Honorary Fellow. In October 2016, she became Head of the Nuffield Department of Clinical Neurosciences.

In October 2017, Tracey was announced as the next Warden of Merton College, Oxford, in succession to Martin J. Taylor. She was installed as Warden on 5 October 2019, becoming the college’s 51st warden.

On 9 May 2022, it was announced that Tracey would be the next Vice-Chancellor of the University of Oxford, with effect from 2023, in succession to Louise Richardson. In her early tenure, she addressed issues including free speech on campus and student welfare, emphasizing the university's commitment to supporting its academic community while responding to public debate and protest activity. In her first oration as vice-chancellor in October 2023, Tracey addressed the controversy surrounding a university-backed appearance by Kathleen Stock, a gender-critical feminist which attracted protests. She defended free speech but was saddened by the attacks and abuse heaped at the university's transgender community during her first year. In 2024, Tracey became involved in responding to the occupation of Oxford University campus by pro-Palestinian protesters. In May of that year, a group of pro-Palestinian student protestors staged a demonstration in Tracey's office while she was there, which led to their arrest.

Tracey has served on scientific committees, including the International Association for the Study of Pain (IASP), British Neuroscience Association, and Lundbeck Brain Prize Committee. She is a member of the Council of the Medical Research Council (MRC) and President of the Federation of European Neuroscience Societies (FENS). She is an advocate for women in science and, as Warden of Merton College, championed greater inclusion and diversity.

=== Research ===
Tracey's research centres on investigating what she calls "the cerebral signature for pain perception" − how key regions of the human brain give rise to pain − and on developing objective, reliable, scientific ways of measuring what has always been considered a highly subjective experience. In particular, Tracey and her colleagues have used fMRI brain scanning techniques to discover the various neural sites and mechanisms that underlie pain, to distinguish between the experience of pain and the anticipation of that experience, and to explore differences in how people experience the same pain in different ways at different times. Her team has also investigated how pain-relief treatments can produce altered states of consciousness and how religious beliefs can affect and alleviate pain. One key finding is that pain is complex and cognitive, and, in Tracey’s words, "sensitive to various mental processes such as the feelings and beliefs that someone has", so it doesn't arise exclusively from a single painful input, such as a pinprick or burn. Her objective is to improve the understanding of chronic pain, its diagnosis, and treatment, partly through the development of more effective drugs.

=== Awards and honours ===
In 2008, Tracey was awarded the triennial Patrick Wall Medal from the Royal College of Anaesthetists and in 2009 was made a Fellow of the Royal College of Anaesthetists (FRCA) for her contributions to the discipline. She won the Suffrage Science award in 2014. In 2015 she was elected a Fellow of the Academy of Medical Sciences (FMedSci) and in 2017 won the Feldberg Foundation prize, followed in 2018 by the British Neuroscience Association’s Outstanding Contribution to Neuroscience award.

In 2020, Tracey was elected a Member of the Academia Europaea (MAE), and in 2022 she was elected an honorary fellow of The Physiological Society.

Tracey was appointed a Commander of the Order of the British Empire (CBE) by Queen Elizabeth II in the 2022 New Year Honours List for services to medical research. She received her CBE insignia from Charles III at Windsor Castle on 16 November 2022 during the first Investiture held by His Majesty following his Accession. In 2023 she was elected a Fellow of the Royal Society (FRS).

=== Publications ===
Tracey has published over 200 original papers; Semantic Scholar lists her as a contributor to over 400 publications including the following publications:

- Pain 2012 Refresher Courses: 14th World Congress on Pain
- Pain: A Ladybird Expert Book
- Wall & Melzack's Textbook of Pain: Expert Consult
- Dissociating Pain from Its Anticipation in the Human Brain
- Exacerbation of Pain by Anxiety Is Associated with Activity in a Hippocampal Network
- Imaging how attention modulates pain in humans using functional MRI
- The Cerebral Signature for Pain Perception and Its Modulation
- A common neurobiology for pain and pleasure
- Neurocognitive aspects of pain perception
- Multidisciplinary research priorities for the COVID-19 pandemic: a call for action for mental health science

=== Public engagement ===
As part of her work to improve public understanding of science, Tracey has made media appearances, including on BBC Radio 4's All in the Mind.

She has created and presented two radio programmes about pain: From Agony to Analgesia, a two-episode BBC programme in 2017, and The Anatomy of Pain, a four-part, BBC Discovery series in 2018.

Tracey's work on pain has also featured in two BBC Horizon TV documentaries; a Science Museum exhibition in London; public lectures at DANA, the Oxford Museum of Natural History, and the Cheltenham Science Festival; and articles in New Scientist, BBC Science Focus, and Good Housekeeping.

The Lancet and The New Yorker have both run profiles of her. She was interviewed by Jim Al-Khalili in April 2019 for BBC Radio 4’s The Life Scientific. She was also listed in The Times’ Life Sciences Global Power List in 2020.

Tracey presented a posthumous MPhil Anthropology degree certificate for Māori scholar Mākereti Papakura to the latter's descendant June Northcroft Grant at the Sheldonian Theatre, Oxford on 27 September 2025, saying it was “an honour to finally recognise Papakura’s influence as a scholar”.

== Personal life ==
Tracey married the climate physicist Myles Allen in 1994 and has three children.

Academic offices
Preceded by Steven Gunn (acting)	Warden of Merton College, Oxford; 2019 to 2022	Succeeded by Jennifer Payne
Preceded by Louise Richardson	Vice-Chancellor of Oxford University; 2023–present	Incumbent
