= John Warde =

John Warde may refer to:

- John William Warde, committed suicide
- John Warde (mayor fl.1375), Lord Mayor of London
- John Warde (mayor fl.1485), Lord Mayor of London

== See also ==
- John Ward (disambiguation)
