= John Knight Fotheringham =

British historian and chronologist (1874-1936)

John Knight Fotheringham FBA (14 August 1874 – 12 December 1936) was a British historian who was an expert on ancient astronomy and chronology. He established the chronology of the Babylonian dynasties.

J.K. Fotheringham was educated at the City of London School and Merton College, Oxford, where he held an exhibition and received first class degrees in Literae Humaniores (1896) and modern history (1897). During 1898–1902, he held a senior demyship at Magdalen College, Oxford, and started to study ancient chronology. In 1904, he was appointed a lecturer in classical literature at King's College London and taught there until 1915.

Fotheringham was a Fellow at Magdalen College (1909–16). He was a Reader in ancient history at the University of London (1912–20). He was later Reader in ancient astronomy and chronology at the University of Oxford (1925–36).

J.K. Fotheringham edited Saint Jerome's version of Eusebius' Chronicle in 1923. He was elected a Fellow of the British Academy in 1933. He was also a Fellow of the Royal Astronomical Society.

== Contributions to Learning ==
Fotheringham's most original work displayed his unusual scholarly skills at the intersection of ancient history, astronomy, and chronology. Among his first published works in 1903 were 'The formation of the Julian calendar with reference to the astronomical year' and 'The date of the Crucifixion'. He returned to this later topic several times. The two most likely dates he determined, 7 April 30 CE and 3 April 33 CE have stood the test of time and are generally accepted. A particular focus of his studies involved the use of astronomy to accurately determine ancient dates. He was, for example, one of the first to use ancient eclipse data to accurately determine the secular acceleration of the sun and moon.

== Selected Publications ==
Fotheringham published a number of papers and books, including the following:

- The Bodleian Manuscript of Jerome's Version of the Chronicle of Eusebius, editor (Oxford: The Clarendon Press, 1905)
- The History of England, from Addington's Administration to the Close of William IV's Reign 1801–1837, Volume XI, with George Charles Brodrick (Longmans, Green, 1906)
- Marco Sanudo, conqueror of the Archipelago, with L.R.F. Williams (Oxford: The Clarendon Press, 1915)
- Cleostratus (London: Clay, 1920)
- Historical eclipses (Oxford: The Clarendon Press, 1921)
- The calendar (London: H.M. Stationery Office, 1929)
- Ancient astronomy and chronology (The Oxford Magazine, 1930)
- Astronomical evidence for the date of the crucifixion
