= Roger Highfield (historian) =

English historian

- Roger Highfield
- Born: John Roger Loxdale Highfield; 14 February 1922
- Died: 13 March 2017 (aged 95)
- Occupations: Historian and academic

Academic background
- Education: Dulwich College
- Alma mater: Magdalen College, Oxford

Academic work
- Institutions: Merton College, Oxford

John Roger Loxdale Highfield (14 February 1922 – 13 April 2017) was an English historian of medieval Europe and fellow of Merton College, University of Oxford. His contribution to the study of medieval Spain was recognised by his appointment to the Order of Isabella the Catholic in 1989.

== Biography ==
Roger Highfield enjoyed a long career at Merton College Oxford which began in 1948 when he joined the college as a Harmsworth Senior Scholar. Prior to that he read history at Magdalen College, Oxford, where he was tutored by the influential historians A. J. P. Taylor and K. B. McFarlane. He also did military service in the Royal Artillery.

In 1951 he became Tutor in History at Merton, a post he kept until he retired in 1989, teaching alongside historians Robert Gildea and Philip Waller. He was also a colleague of J. R. R. Tolkien, for whom he had little respect, describing the author as “very lazy" and “the worst sub-warden ever”, adding that Tolkien-mania left him “baffled”. When champagne was ordered to mark Tolkien's donation to the college of his original manuscript of The Hobbit, Highfield remarked acidly: "waste of good champagne". These statements are refuted by persons who personally knew Highfield and testified that he had friendly relations with Tolkien. This is what Philip Waller wrote on the subject: "[Highfield] liked Tolkien personally but couldn’t fathom the fuss that surrounded him." According to historian Mikhail Kizilov, who many times personally spoke to Highfield about Tolkien in the 2000s, the two scholars were good friends who often played squash. The alleged "original manuscript of The Hobbit" mentioned in Highfield's obituary was in fact Silmarillion which Tolkien tried to hand in by mistake. Kizilov never heard Highfield speaking about Tolkien with derision, only with respect and warm remembrances.

He was tutor to the emperor of Japan Naruhito at Merton College and is mentioned in his memoir The Thames and I.

Highfield served as Merton's archivist for almost 40 years, as well as other college offices. In 1953 Highfield began a series of annual history reading weeks in Cornwall, open to all undergraduate historians, a tradition which continues today.

In 1997 he published the History of Merton College, which was jointly authored with the historian and archivist Geoffrey Martin, drawing heavily on documents from the college archives.

Highfield's scholarship focused on late medieval Spain, in recognition of which he was awarded the Order of Isabella the Catholic in 1989.

== Selected publications ==
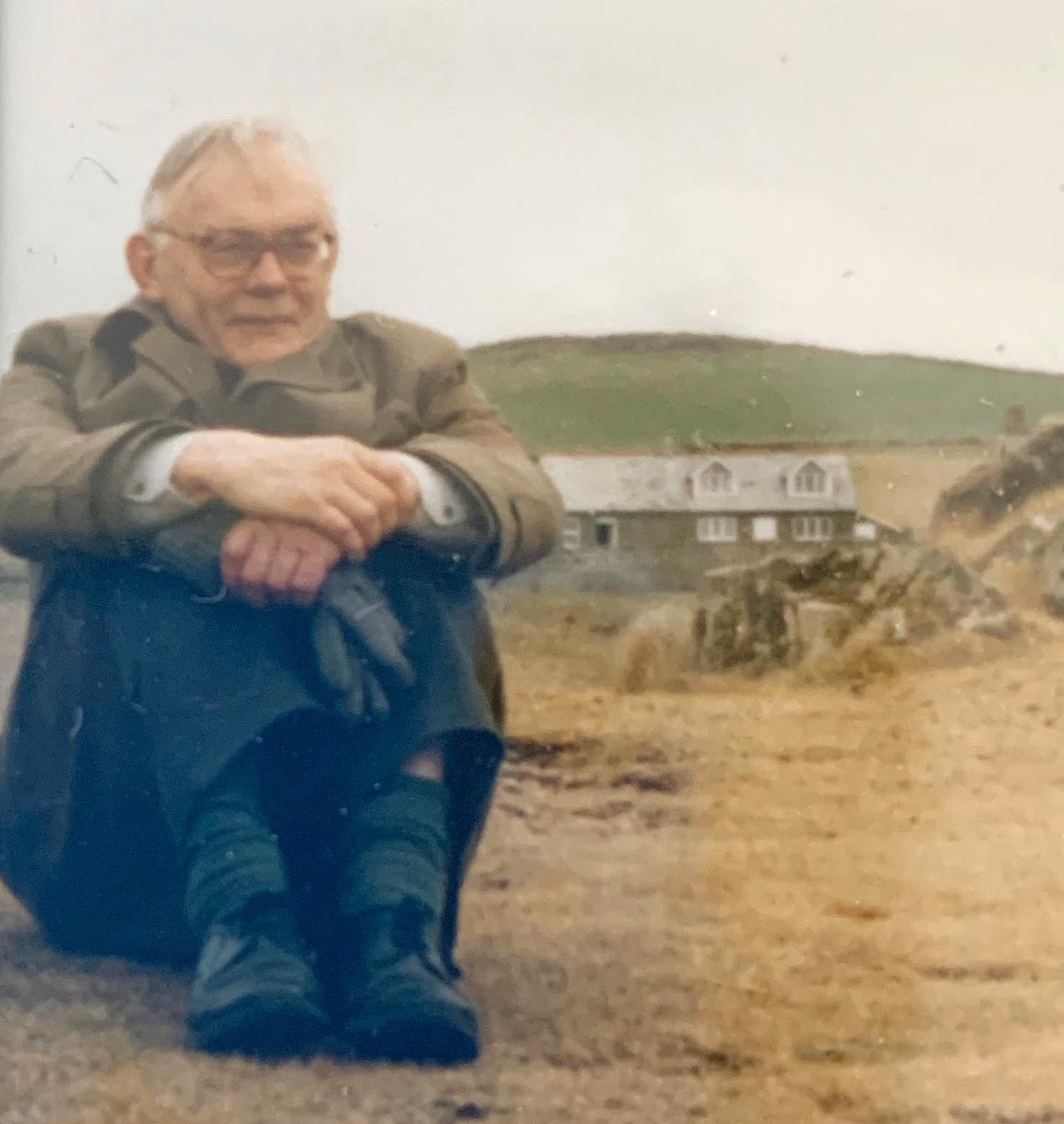
Roger Highfield in Cornwall in 1990

- The Early Rolls of Merton College, Oxford; with an appendix of thirteenth-century Oxford charters. Oxford: Clarendon Press, 1964
- Europe in the Late Middle Ages. London: Faber, 1970. (Edited with J. R. Hale & B. Smalley)
- Spain in the Fifteenth Century, 1369-1516: essays and extracts by historians of Spain. London: Macmillan, 1972. (Editor) ISBN 0333111354
- The Crown and Local Communities in England and France in the Fifteenth Century. London: Sutton, 1981. (Edited with Robin Jeffs) ISBN 0904387674
- Oxford and Cambridge. Cambridge: Cambridge University Press, 1988. (With Christopher Brooke) ISBN 0521301394
- A History of Merton College, Oxford. Oxford: Oxford University Press, 1997. (with G. H. Martin) ISBN 0199201838
- Registrum annalium Collegii Mertonensis, 1603-1660. Woodbridge: Boydell Press/Oxford Historical Society, 2006. ISBN 0904107205

== See also ==
- Karl Leyser
- John Roberts
