= G. R. G. Mure =

British idealist philosopher and Oxford academic (1893-1979)

- Born: Geoffrey Reginald Gilchrist Mure; 8 April 1893; London, England
- Died: 24 May 1979 (aged 86); London, England

Education
- Education: Merton College, Oxford

Philosophical work
- Era: 20th-century philosophy
- Region: Western philosophy
- School: British idealism

Geoffrey Reginald Gilchrist Mure (8 April 1893 – 24 May 1979) was a British idealist philosopher and Oxford academic who specialised in the works of the German philosopher Hegel.

== Biography ==
Mure was born on 8 April 1893, the son of Reginald James Mure and Anna Charlotte Neave. He was educated at Eton College and Merton College, Oxford, where he studied philosophy under the tutelage of Harold Joachim. He took a First in Classical Moderations in 1913. With the outbreak of the First World War in 1914 he enlisted in the Warwicks Royal Horse Artillery. He served in France and Belgium, 1915–18, and was awarded the Military Cross, the Chevalier Ordre de la Couronne, and the Croix de Guerre; he was also mentioned in despatches. He left the Army in 1919 and in the same year was awarded an M.A. at Oxford. He was appointed Fellow and Tutor of Merton College in 1922. He was an Oxford University Lecturer in Philosophy, 1929–37.

During the Second World War he served in the General Staff, 21 Group War Office, and the Supreme Headquarters Allied Expeditionary Force. His war work centred on propaganda.

He became the Warden of Merton College in 1947 and held the post until 1963. He was Pro-Vice-Chancellor, University of Oxford, in 1957.

Mure married Kathleen Mary Seton in 1927 (marriage dissolved, 1963) and in 1964 Josephine Browne (d. 1974).

His Who's Who recreations were listed as formerly rowing, fox hunting, miscellaneous ball games, and sketching.

He died on 24 May 1979.

== Books ==
G. R. G. Mure wrote a number of books and articles, including:

Academic books

- Posterior Analytics, translation of Aristotle, under the editorship of W D Ross (1925)
- Aristotle (1932)
- An Introduction to Hegel (1940)
- A Study of Hegel's Logic (1950)
- Retreat from Truth (1958)
- Some Elements in Hegel's Logic: Dawes Hicks lecture on philosophy (1959)
- The Philosophy of Hegel (1965)
- The Economic and the Moral in the Philosophy of Benedetto Croce, Reading : University of Reading, 1966
- Idealist Epilogue (1978)

Academic articles and introductions

- 'The Marriage of Universals (I)', Journal of Philosophical Studies [later Philosophy], 3 : 11, July 1928, 313-23
- 'The Marriage of Universals (II)', Journal of Philosophical Studies [later Philosophy], 3 : 12, October 1928, 443–56
- 'Change', Philosophy, 9 : 35, July 1934, 293–301
- 'Change (II)', Philosophy, 9 : 36, October 1934, 450–60
- 'Oxford and Philosophy', Philosophy, 12 : 47, July 1937, 291–301
- 'The Organic State', Philosophy, 24 : 90, July 1949, 205–18
- 'Benedetto Croce and Oxford', Philosophical Quarterly, 4 : 17, October 1954, 327–331
- 'F.H. Bradley', Encounter, 88, January 1961, 28–35
- 'Foreword' to F.G. Weiss, Hegel's Critique of Aristotle's Philosophy of Mind, The Hague : Martinus Nijhoff, 1969, xi–xxv
- 'Hegel: How, and How Far, is Philosophy Possible?' in F.G. Weiss, Beyond Epistemology, The Hague : Martinus Nijhoff, 1974, 1–29
- 'Cause and Because in Aristotle', Philosophy, 50 : 193, July 1975, 356–7

Fiction

- Josephine: A Fairy Thriller (1937)
- The Boots and Josephine (1939)

Academic offices
Preceded by John Charles Miles	Warden of Merton College, Oxford; 1947–1963	Succeeded by Robin Harrison
