= Eilís Ferran =

Northern Irish solicitor, legal scholar, and academic administrator (born 1962)

Professor Eilís Ferran FBA
- Born: Eilís Veronica Deirdre Ferran; 14 March 1962 (age 64)
- Title: Professor of Company and Securities Law
- Spouse: Roderick Cantrill (m. 1992)
- Children: Two

Academic background
- Education: St Catharine's College, Cambridge

Academic work
- Discipline: Law
- Sub-discipline: Financial regulation; company law; corporate finance law
- Institutions: St Catharine's College, Cambridge; Faculty of Law, University of Cambridge

Eilís Veronica Ferran, FBA (born 14 March 1962) is a Northern Irish solicitor, legal scholar, and academic administrator. As an academic, she specialises in company law, financial regulation, and corporate finance. She has been Professor of Company and Securities Law at the University of Cambridge since 2005, and its Pro-Vice-Chancellor for Institutional and International Relations since 2015.

== Early life and education ==
Ferran was born on 14 March 1962 in Belfast, Northern Ireland. She was educated at St Dominic's High School, an all-girls Catholic School in Belfast. In 1980, she matriculated into St Catharine's College, Cambridge to study law. She was the first member of her family to attend the University of Cambridge. She graduated with a first class Bachelor of Arts (BA) degree in 1983; as is the privilege of Cambridge graduates, she was able to apply for her BA to be promoted to a Master of Arts (MA Cantab) degree in 1986. In 1992, she was awarded a Doctorate of Philosophy (PhD) by the University of Cambridge by Special Regulations, that is to say through published works rather than a doctoral thesis.

== Career ==
=== Legal career ===
From 1984 to 1986, Ferran was an articled clerk at Coward Chance (now known as Clifford Chance). She qualified as a solicitor in 1986. From September to December 2012, she was a specialist advisor to the House of Lords European Union Committee during its inquiry into banking union.

=== Academic career ===
In 1986, Ferran returned to St Catharine's College, Cambridge (her alma mater) as a lecturer in law. She was elected a Fellow of St Catharine's College in 1987. She was also an assistant lecturer from 1988 to 1991 and a lecturer from 1991 to 2000 at the Faculty of Law, University of Cambridge. She was Director of the Centre for Corporate and Commercial Law from April 1999 to September 2003, and its Co-Director from January 2006 to 2010. In 2000, the university promoted her to Reader in Corporate Law and Financial Regulation. In 2005, she was appointed Professor of Company and Securities Law; this made her the first woman to hold a professorship in Cambridge's Faculty of Law. From April 2012 to 2015, she served as the Chair of the Faculty of Law. Since 1 October 2015, she has been the Pro-Vice-Chancellor for Institutional and International Relations.

Ferran has held a number of visiting appointments. In April 2002, she was a visiting professor to the University of Hong Kong. From July to August 2004, she was a Chapman Tripp Fellow at the Victoria University of Wellington, New Zealand. From July to August 2009, she was a visiting professor at the Law Faculty of the University of Auckland, New Zealand. From July to August 2010, she was a visiting professor at Harvard Law School, United States.

== Personal life ==
In 1992, Ferran married Roderick Cantrill, who is the Bursar of Fitzwilliam College, Cambridge. Together they have one son and one daughter.

== Honours ==
In 2013, Ferran was elected a Fellow of the British Academy (FBA), the United Kingdom's national academy for the humanities and social sciences. On 11 November 2014, she was appointed an Honorary Bencher of the Middle Temple.

== Selected works ==
- Ferran, Eilís (1992). Mortgage Securitisation: Legal Aspects. London: Butterworths. ISBN 978-0406109408.
- Ferran, Eilís; Goodhart, Charles A. E., eds. (2001). Regulating Financial Services and Markets in the 21st Century. Oxford: Hart Publishing. ISBN 978-1841132792.
- Ferran, Eilís (2004). Building an EU Securities Market. Cambridge: Cambridge University Press. ISBN 978-0521847223.
- Ferran, Eilis (2008). Principles of Corporate Finance Law (1st ed.). New York: Oxford University Press. ISBN 978-0199230501.
- Ferran, Eilís; Moloney, Niamh; Hill, Jennifer G.; Coffee Jr, John C. (2012). The Regulatory Aftermath of the Global Financial Crisis. Cambridge: Cambridge University Press. ISBN 978-1107024595.
- Ferran, Eilís; Ho, Look Chan (2014). Principles of Corporate Finance Law (2nd ed.). Oxford: Oxford University Press. ISBN 978-0199671342.
- Moloney, Niamh; Ferran, Eilís; Payne, Jennifer, eds. (2015). The Oxford Handbook of Financial Regulation. Oxford: Oxford University Press. ISBN 978-0199687206.
