= Michael Drayton =

English poet and playwright (1563-1631)

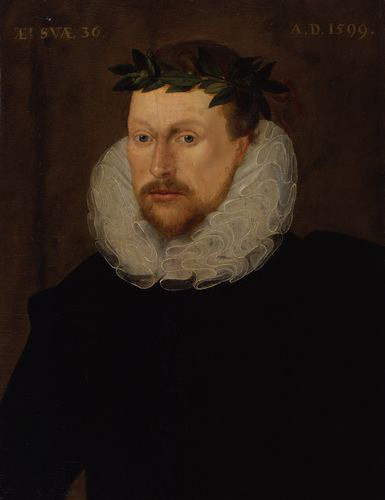
- Portrait of Drayton, 1599
- Born: 1563; Hartshill, Nuneaton, Warwickshire, England, Kingdom of England
- Died: 23 December 1631 (aged 67–68); London, England, Kingdom of England
- Resting place: Poets' Corner, Westminster Abbey, London
- Occupation: poet
- Writing career
- Pen name: "Rowland"
- Language: English
- Subject: Historical poetry
- Notable works: "Mortimeriados", Poly-Olbion, "The Battaile of Agincourt"

Michael Drayton (1563 – 23 December 1631) was an English poet who came to prominence in the Elizabethan era, continuing to write through the reign of James I and into the reign of Charles I. Many of his works consisted of historical poetry. He was also the first English-language author to write odes in the style of Horace. He died in 1631 in London.

== Early life ==
Drayton was born at Hartshill, near Nuneaton, Warwickshire, England, in early 1563. Not much is documented about his early life, except that in 1580 he was in the service of Thomas Goodere of Collingham, Nottinghamshire. In his early years, it is believed that Drayton entered the service of Sir Henry Goodere, who provided for Drayton's education. 19th- and 20th-century scholars, on the basis of scattered allusions in his poems and dedications, suggested that Drayton might have studied at the University of Oxford, and been intimate with the Polesworth branch of the Goodere family. More recent work has cast doubt on those speculations, suggesting that it is more likely Drayton's "social status was inferior to that of William Shakespeare and well below that of Edmund Spenser or Samuel Daniel, both of whom obtained university degrees".

== Literary career ==
=== 1590–1602 ===
In 1590, he produced his first book, The Harmony of the Church, a volume of spiritual poems, dedicated to Lady Devereux. It is notable for a version of the Song of Solomon, executed with considerable richness of expression. However, with the exception of forty copies, seized by the Archbishop of Canterbury, the whole edition was destroyed by public order. Nevertheless, Drayton published a vast amount within the next few years.

In 1593 appeared Idea: The Shepherd's Garland, a collection of nine pastorals, in which he celebrated his personal love-sorrows under the pseudonym of Rowland. Drayton then produced two further 'Ideas': a cycle of 51 sonnets entitled Ideas Mirrour (1594, expanded and revised as Idea in several versions from 1599 to 1619), by which we learn that the lady lived by the river Ankor in Warwickshire, and an epyllion, Endimion and Phoebe: Ideas Latmus (1595).

This has led to the notion that he failed to win his "Idea", and lived and died a bachelor, one of a series of biographical interpretations of the poems that Jean Brink sees as "romantic flourishes".

Drayton was the first to use the term "ode" to describe a lyrical poem, in England and frequently used the staccato Anacreontics measure.

Also in 1593 there appeared the first of Drayton's historical poems, The Legend of Piers Gaveston, and the next year saw the publication of Matilda, an epic poem in rhyme royal. It was about this time, too, that he brought out Endimion and Phoebe, a volume which he never republished, but which contains some interesting autobiographical matter, and acknowledgments of literary help from Thomas Lodge, if not from Edmund Spenser and Samuel Daniel also. In his Fig for Momus, Lodge reciprocated these friendly courtesies.

In 1596, Drayton published his long and important poem Mortimeriados, a very serious production in ottava rima. He later enlarged and modified this poem, and republished it in 1603 under the title of The Barons' Wars. In 1596 also appeared another historical poem, The Legend of Robert, Duke of Normandy, with which Piers Gaveston was reprinted. In 1597 appeared England's Heroical Epistles, a series of historical studies, in imitation of those of Ovid. These last poems, written in the heroic couplet, contain some of the finest passages in Drayton's writings.

=== 1603–1631 ===
By 1597, the poet was resting on his laurels. It seems that he was much favoured at the court of Elizabeth, and he hoped that it would be the same with her successor. In 1603, he addressed a poem of compliment to James I on his accession, but it was ridiculed and his services were rejected. His bitterness found expression in a satire, The Owl (1604), but he had no talent in this kind of composition. Not much more entertaining was his scriptural narrative of Moses in a Map of his Miracles, a sort of epic in heroics printed the same year. In 1605, Drayton reprinted his most important works, his historical poems and the Idea, in a single volume which ran through eight editions during his lifetime. He also collected his smaller pieces, hitherto unedited, in a volume undated, but probably published in 1605, under the title of Poems Lyric and Pastoral; these consisted of odes, eclogues and a fantastic satire called The Man in the Moon. Some of the odes are extremely spirited.

He had adopted as early as 1598 the extraordinary resolution of celebrating all the points of topographical or antiquarian interest in the island of Great Britain, and on this laborious work he was engaged for many years. At last, in 1613, the first part of this vast work was published under the title of Poly-Olbion, eighteen books being produced, to which the learned John Selden supplied notes.

The success of this work, which has since become so famous, was very small at first, and not until 1622 did Drayton succeed in finding a publisher willing to undertake the risk of bringing out twelve more books in a second part. This completed the survey of England, and the poet, who had hoped "to crown Scotland with flowers," and arrive at last at the Orcades, never crossed the Tweed.

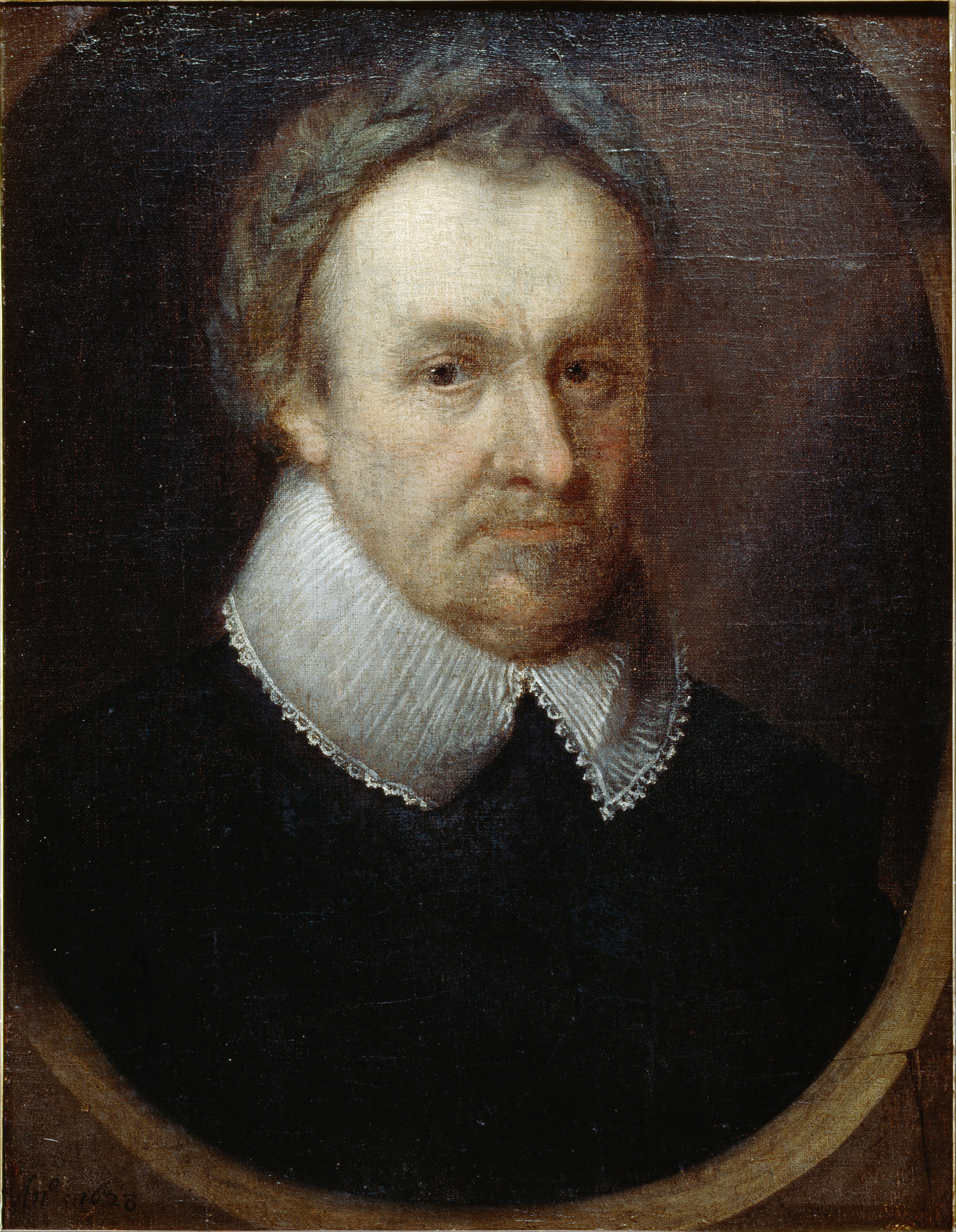
Drayton in 1628

In 1627 he published another of his miscellaneous volumes, and this contains some of his most characteristic writing. It consists of the following pieces: The Battle of Agincourt, an historical poem in ottava rima (not to be confused with his ballad on the same subject), and The Miseries of Queen Margaret, written in the same verse and manner; Nimphidia, the Court of Faery, an epic of fairyland; The Quest of Cinthia and The Shepherd's Sirena, two lyrical pastorals; and finally The Moon Calf, a sort of satire. Nimphidia is the most critically acclaimed, along with his famous ballad on the battle of Agincourt. The last of Drayton's voluminous publications was The Muses' Elizium in 1630.

In one of Drayton's poems, an elegy or epistle to Mr Henry Reynolds, he left some valuable criticisms on English poets from Chaucer's time to his own, including Shakespeare.

According to one 19th century source,

The merits of Drayton as a poet are truly great. His historical poems have about them a heavy magnificence; the most gorgeous images and the boldest descriptions follow in stately array, clothed in well-turned and appropriate verse …

He died in London, was buried in Poets' Corner in Westminster Abbey, and had a monument placed over him by the Countess of Dorset, with memorial lines attributed to Ben Jonson. The memorial was sculpted by Edward Marshall.

=== Theatre ===
Like other poets of his era, Drayton was active in writing for the theatre; but unlike Shakespeare, Ben Jonson, or Samuel Daniel, he invested little of his art in the genre. For a period of only five years, from 1597 to 1602, Drayton was a member of the stable of playwrights who supplied material for the theatrical syndicate of Philip Henslowe. Henslowe's Diary links Drayton's name with 23 plays from that period, and shows that Drayton almost always worked in collaboration with other Henslowe regulars, like Thomas Dekker, Anthony Munday and Henry Chettle, among others. Of these 23 plays, only one has survived, that being Part 1 of Sir John Oldcastle, which Drayton composed in collaboration with Munday, Robert Wilson and Richard Hathwaye. The text of Oldcastle shows no clear signs of Drayton's hand; traits of style consistent through the entire corpus of his poetry (the rich vocabulary of plant names, star names and other unusual words; the frequent use of original contractional forms, sometimes with double apostrophes, like "th'adult'rers" or "pois'ned'st") are wholly absent from the text, suggesting that his contribution to the collaborative effort was not substantial. William Longsword, the one play that Henslowe's Diary suggests was a solo Drayton effort, was never completed.

Drayton may have preferred the role of impresario to that of playwright; he was one of the lessees of the Whitefriars Theatre, together with Thomas Woodford, nephew of the playwright Thomas Lodge, when it was started in 1608. Around 1606, Drayton was also part of a syndicate that chartered a company of child actors, The Children of the King's Revels. These may or may not have been the Children of Paul's under a new name, since the latter group appears to have gone out of existence at about this time. The venture was not a success, dissolving in litigation in 1609.

=== Friendships ===
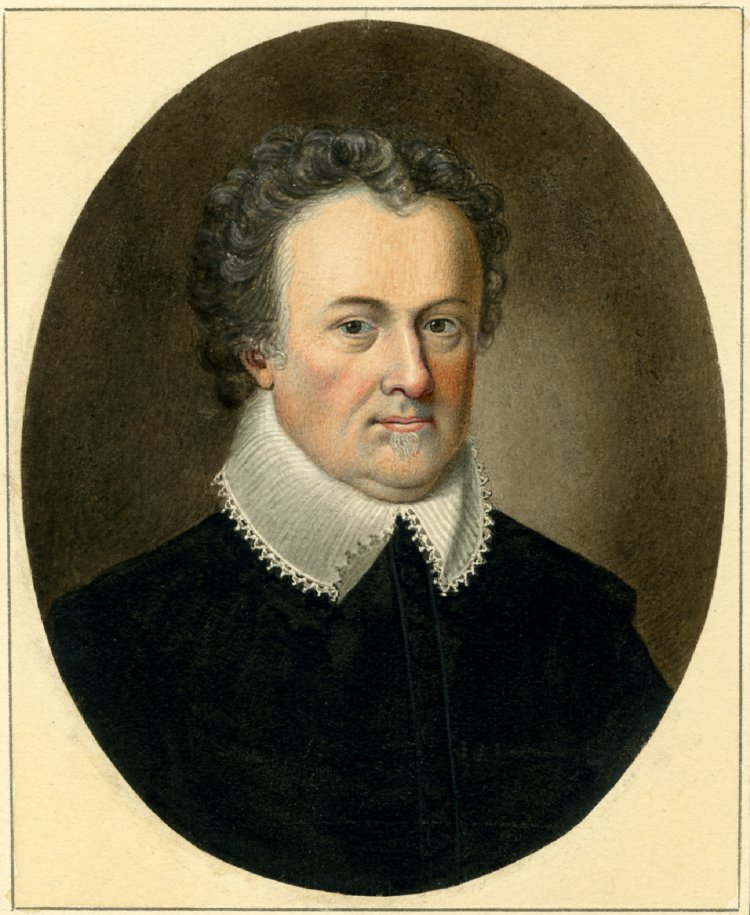
Portrait of Drayton by Sylvester Harding

Drayton was a friend of some of the most famous men of the age. He corresponded familiarly with Drummond; Ben Jonson, William Browne, George Wither and others were among his friends. Vicar John Ward, who was transferred to Stratford-upon-Avon in 1661, in his attempt to compile hearsay of Shakespeare, wrote that "Shakespear Drayton and Ben Jhonson (sic) had a merry meeting and it seems drank too hard for Shakespear died of a feavour there contracted."

== Editions ==
In 1748 a folio edition of Drayton's complete works was published under the editorial supervision of William Oldys, and again in 1753 there appeared an issue in four volumes quarto but these were very unintelligently and inaccurately prepared.

A complete edition of Drayton's works with variant readings was projected by Richard Hooper in 1876, but was never carried to a conclusion; a volume of selections, edited by A. H. Bullen, appeared in 1883. See especially Oliver Elton, Michael Drayton (1906).

A complete five-volume edition of Drayton's work was published by Oxford in 1931–41 (revised 1961), edited by J. William Hebel, K. Tillotson and B. H. Newdigate. That and a two-volume edition of Drayton's poems published at Harvard in 1953, edited by John Buxton, are the only 20th-century editions of his poems recorded by the Library of Congress.
