= George Charles Brodrick =

British historian and author

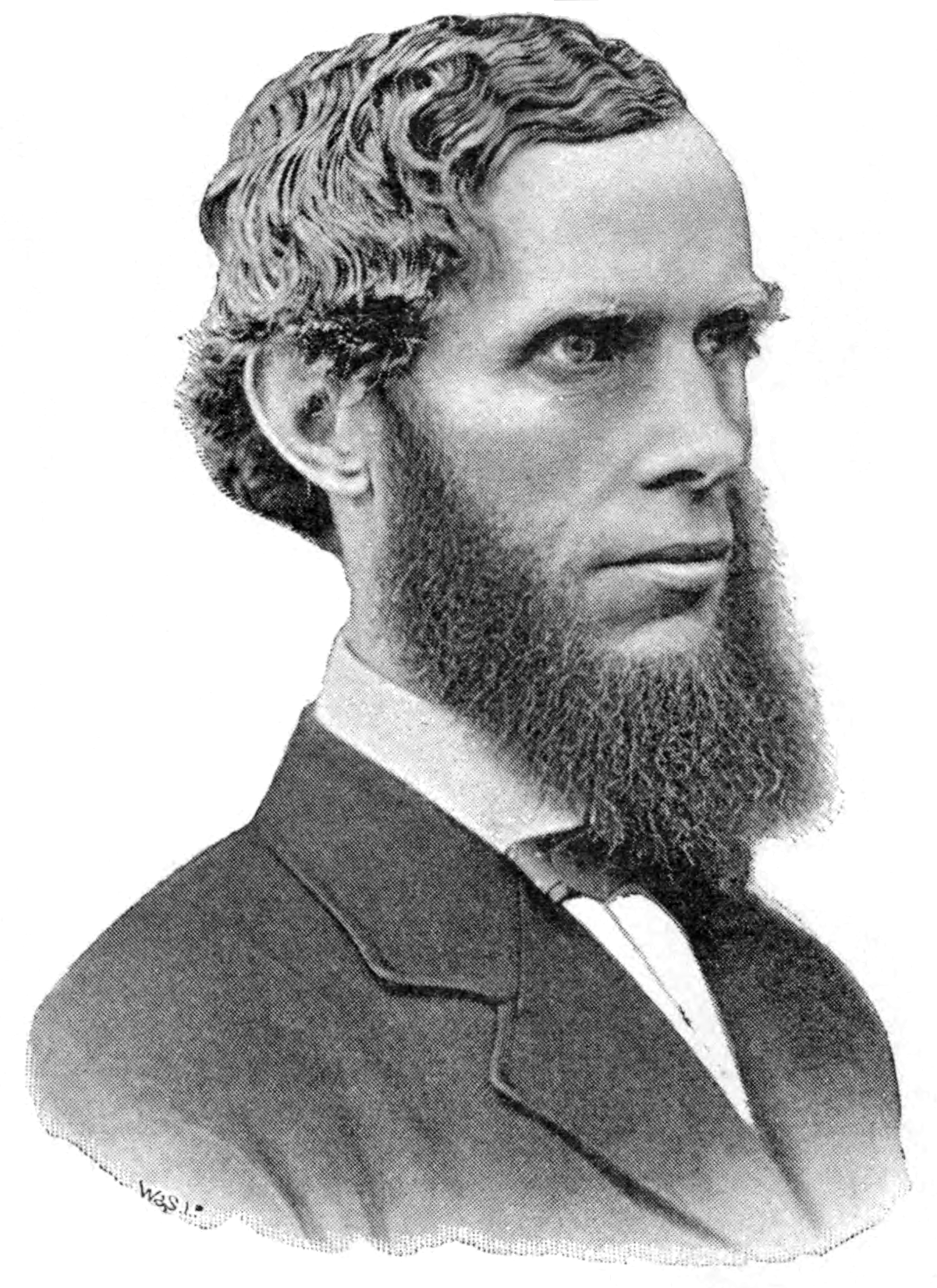
George Charles Brodrick

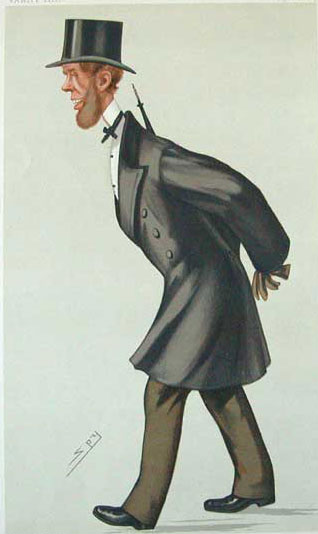
George Charles Brodrick, caricature by "Spy" (Leslie Ward)

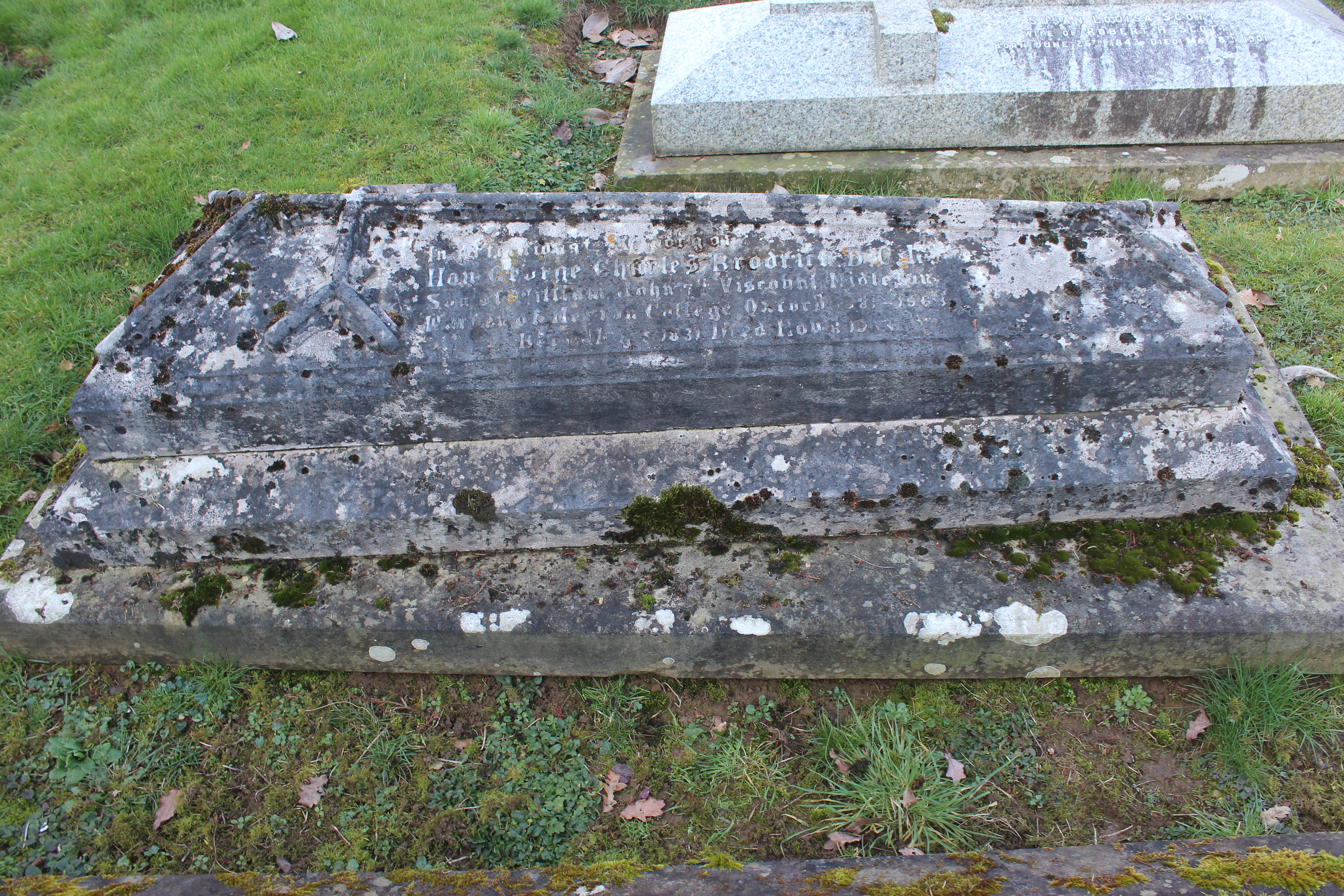
Grave in Peper Harow, Surrey

The Honourable George Charles Brodrick (5 May 1831 – 8 November 1903) was an Oxford historian and author who became Warden of Merton College, Oxford.

== Life ==
He was the son of William Brodrick, 7th Viscount Midleton and younger brother of William Brodrick, 8th Viscount Midleton. He was educated at Eton College and Balliol College, Oxford, where he attained a first class degree in classics (1853) and in law and history (1854). He was President of the Oxford Union during 1854–55. He gained his B.A, degree in 1854, and was M.A. in 1856, and D.C.L. in 1886.

Brodrick was elected to be a Fellow of Merton College in 1855 and was called to the bar in 1859. He joined the staff of The Times in 1860. At the 1868 and 1874 general elections, Brodrick stood as a Liberal at Woodstock, but was defeated. He was opposed to William Ewart Gladstone's policy on Ireland. He was a member of the London School Board from 1877 to 1879 and Warden of Merton from 1881 until his death in 1903.

== Books ==
Brodrick wrote a number of books, including:

- English Land and English Landlords: An Enquiry into the Origin and Characters of the English Land System, with Proposals for its Reform (1881)
- Essays on Reform (1867)
- The History of England: From Addington's Administration to the Close of William IV's Reign, 1801–1837 (with John Knight Fotheringham)
- A History of the University of Oxford (1886)
- Literary Fragments
- Memorials of Merton College; With Biographical Notices of the Wardens and Fellows (1885)
- Memories and Impressions, 1831–1900 (1900)
- Political Studies (1879)
- The Reform of the English Land System

Academic offices
Preceded by Robert Bullock Marsham	Warden of Merton College, Oxford; 1881–1903	Succeeded by Thomas Bowman
