= John Ward (Hampshire cricketer) =

English cricketer

Personal information
- Full name: John Ward
- Batting: Unknown
- Bowling: Unknown-arm roundarm fast

Domestic team information
- Years: Team
- 1877: Hampshire

Career statistics
Competition	First-class
Matches	1
Runs scored	14
Batting average	7.00
100s/50s	–/–
Top score	11
Balls bowled	152
Wickets	0
Bowling average	–
5 wickets in innings	–
10 wickets in match	–
Best bowling	–
Catches/stumpings	–/–
- Source: CricketArchive, 6 January 2010

John Ward (dates of birth and death unknown) was an English first-class cricketer.

Ward, who was a roundarm fast bowler, made a single appearance in first-class cricket for Hampshire against Kent at Canterbury in 1877. He bowled 38 wicketless overs which conceded 77 runs in Kent's first innings, while with the bat he made scores of 3 and 11 from the lower order, with Ward being dismissed by George Burke and George Hearne.
