= Jonathan Ward =

Jonathan Ward may refer to:

- Jonathan Ward (actor) (born 1970), American actor
- Jonathan Ward (American football) (born 1997), American football player
- Jonathan Ward (athlete), British Paralympic athlete
- Jonathan Ward (politician) (1768–1842), American politician from New York

== See also ==
- Jonny Ward, musician in Pg. 99
- John Ward (disambiguation)
