= Robert Gildea =

History professor

Professor Robert Gildea FBA FRHistS
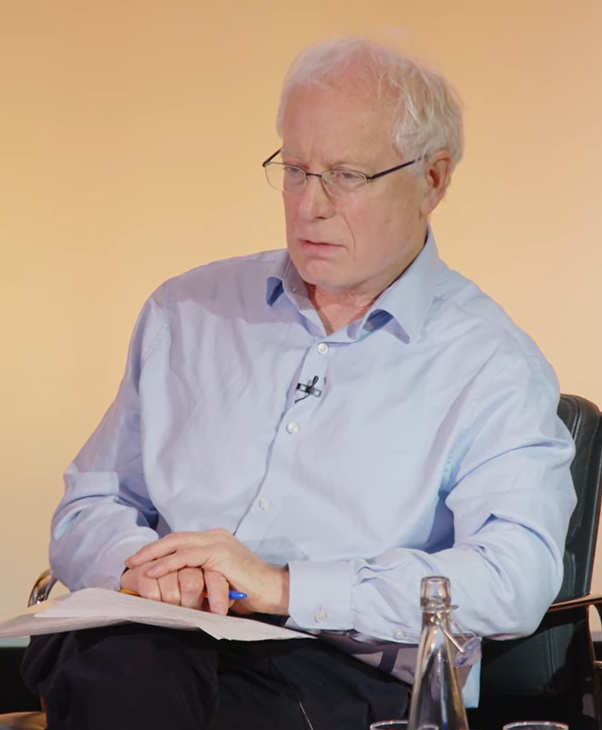
- Gildea in 2024
- Born: 12 September 1952 (age 74); England, UK
- Occupations: Historian and academic
- Title: Professor of Modern History
- Awards: Wolfson History Prize

Academic background
- Education: Merton College, Oxford (B.A.); St Antony's College, Oxford (D.Phil.)
- Doctoral advisor: Theodore Zeldin

Academic work
- Institutions: King's College, London; Merton College, Oxford; Worcester College, Oxford
- Main interests: French history, French education
- Notable works: Marianne in Chains (2002)

Robert Nigel Gildea FBA FRHistS (born 12 September 1952) is Emeritus Professor of Modern History at the University of Oxford and is the author of several influential books on 20th century French history.

== Biography ==
Robert Gildea was born on 12 September 1952. He was educated at Dulwich College and at Merton College, Oxford, before attending St Antony's for a D.Phil under the supervision of Theodore Zeldin. His D.Phil. research was in French provincial education. Before being appointed Fellow in Modern History at Merton in 1979, he was a lecturer at King's College, London.

For his 2002 book Marianne in Chains, a study of life in provincial France during the German occupation, Gildea won the prestigious Wolfson History Prize.

He was elevated to the position of Professor of Modern History from being Professor of Modern French History in September 2006, becoming a Professorial Fellow of Worcester College. He retired in 2020, being succeeded by Patricia Clavin as Professor of Modern History in 2021.

On 10 June 2021 in a BBC Radio 4 interview he declared he was joining other concerned academics in boycotting Oriel College for its refusal to remove the statue of Cecil Rhodes from the façade of the building, erected using money donated by Rhodes.

=== Broadcasting ===
Gildea has made five appearances on the BBC Radio 4 series In Our Time, discussing Madame Bovary (2007); the Statue of Liberty (2008); the Dreyfus affair (2009); Tocqueville's Democracy in America (2018); and the 1870-71 siege of Paris (2020).

== Personal life ==
Gildea lives in Oxford with his wife, Lucy-Jean, and four children.

In May 2016, Gildea was one of 300 prominent historians, including Simon Schama and Niall Ferguson, who were signatories to a letter to The Guardian, telling voters that if they chose to leave the European Union on 23 June, they would be condemning Britain to irrelevance.

== Bibliography ==
- Barricades and Borders: Europe 1800–1914. Oxford: Oxford University Press. 1987.
- France since 1945. Oxford: Oxford University Press. 2002.
- Marianne in Chains: In Search of the German Occupation, 1940–1945. London: Macmillan. 2002.
- Children of the Revolution: The French, 1799–1914. London: Penguin. 2008.
- « La génération française de 1968 : points de vue personnel et politique ». L’Amuse-Bouche : La revue française de Yale. The French-Language Journal at Yale University. 1/1 (2010): 39–48.
- "Napoleon : saint, sinner or both?". Reviews. History Today. 63 (11): 58–59. November 2013. Review essay.
- Fighters in the Shadows: A New History of the French Resistance. Cambridge, Massachusetts: The Belknap Press of Harvard University Press. 2015. ISBN 9780674286108. LCCN 2015018188.
- Empires of the Mind: The Colonial Past and the Politics of the Present. Oxford University Press (2019).

== See also ==
- Roger Highfield
- Philip Waller
