= Jennifer Payne =

British legal scholar and solicitor

- Born: 1970 (age 55–56)
- Occupations: Legal scholar Solicitor

Academic work
- Discipline: Law
- Institutions: University of Oxford Faculty of Law

52nd Warden of Merton College
- Incumbent
- Assumed office 2023
- Preceded by: Irene Tracey

Jennifer Payne (born 1970) is a British legal scholar and solicitor, who specialises in corporate law, financial law and financial regulation. Since 2023, she has been 52nd Warden of Merton College, Oxford. Having been a fellow of Merton College since 1998, she was also Linklaters Professor of Corporate Finance Law at the Faculty of Law, University of Oxford, until her election as warden.

== Selected works ==
- Payne, Jennifer, ed. (2002). Takeovers in English and German law. Oxford: Hart. ISBN 978-1841133409.
- Jennifer, Payne (2014). Schemes of arrangement: theory, structure and operation. Cambridge: Cambridge University Press. ISBN 978-1-107-01640-8. OCLC 907572699.
- Gullifer, Louise; Payne, Jennifer (2015). Corporate finance law: principles and policy (2nd ed.). Oxford: Hart. ISBN 978-1849466004.
- Moloney, Niamh; Ferran, Eilís; Payne, Jennifer, eds. (2015). The Oxford handbook of financial regulation (1 ed.). Oxford: Oxford University Press. ISBN 978-0199687213.
- Gullifer, Louise; Payne, Jennifer (2020). Corporate finance law: principles and policy (3rd ed.). Oxford and New York: Hart. ISBN 978-1509929177.

Academic offices
Preceded by Irene Tracey	Warden of Merton College, Oxford; 2023 to present	Incumbent
