= Gosford Hill School =

Location
- Oxford Road; Gosford, Oxfordshire, OX5 2NT; England; 51.81624°N 1.27913°W

Information
- Type: Academy
- Established: 1932
- Local authority: Oxfordshire
- Specialist: Maths and Computing
- Department for Education URN: 138897 Tables
- Ofsted: Reports
- Head teacher: Nigel Sellars
- Staff: 90
- Gender: Coeducational
- Age: 11 to 18
- Enrolment: 900
- Website: www.gosford-hill.oxon.sch.uk

Gosford Hill School is a co-educational secondary school with academy status in the town of Kidlington in Oxfordshire, England.

== History ==
The school, originally called the Kidlington Church of England Central School, was built to teach children over the age of 11 whose numbers had grown during the 1920s to the point where the National School in the village was not able to accommodate them. By combining the number of over-11s from Kidlington with those from the church schools in the surrounding villages of Begbroke, Cassington, Hampton Poyle, Islip, Noke, Oddington, Shipton-on-Cherwell, Thrupp and Yarnton a sufficient number was achieved to justify the cost of a new school.

The first Headteacher, when the school opened on 7 September 1932, was Herbert Chapman who had been the head of the National School.

The original buildings, designed by R Fielding Dodd, ARIBA and GT Gardner consisted of 4 classrooms and a Practical Studies Centre. Two more classrooms were added in 1934. The site of 4 acres (16,000 m^{2}) had been part of Gosford Hill Farm, which itself had been turned into Oxford Zoological Gardens by Frank Gray by the time the school was built.

On 1 November 2012 the school completed its transition to an academy.

On 12 June 2024 Cherwell District Council granted the school planning permission for a complete demolition and replacement with a new L-shaped, three-storey building under the Department for Education’s School Rebuilding Programme.

== Sporting achievements ==
On 16 May 2016, Gosford Hill were crowned the English Schools' Football Association Under 15s National Small Schools Cup Champions, defeating Howden School from East Riding of Yorkshire 6-3 at the Madejski Stadium in Reading.

== Notable alumni ==
- David Rodigan - Reggae DJ and radio presenter
- Tim Supple - Theatre and opera director
- Nick Cope - musician
- The Candyskins - 1989 rock band
- Irene Tracey - Vice Chancellor of the University of Oxford
