= Niamh Moloney =

British legal scholar

Niamh Moloney FBA (born 1969) is a scholar of law. She is Professor of Law at the London School of Economics.

== Biography ==
Moloney studied at Trinity College Dublin and Harvard Law School. Her academic specialism is in EU financial market regulation.

She is on the editorial board of the European Law Review, and is a series editor of the "International Corporate Law and Financial Market Regulation" series of Cambridge University Press. Moloney is also on the commission board of the Central Bank of Ireland.

She was elected as a Fellow of the British Academy (FBA) in 2018. In 2019, she was awarded an honorary doctorate from the University of Zurich. In 2022, she was elected a member of the Royal Irish Academy.

== Selected works ==
- Moloney, Niamh; Ferran, Eilís; Payne, Jennifer, eds. (2015). The Oxford handbook of financial regulation (1 ed.). Oxford: Oxford University Press. ISBN 978-0199687213.
