= Rex Richards (chemist) =

British scientist and academic (1922–2019)

Sir Rex Richards
- Born: Rex Edward Richards; 28 October 1922; Colyton, Devon, England
- Died: 15 July 2019 (aged 96)
- Known for: Vice Chancellor of University of Oxford (1977–1981); Chancellor of the University of Exeter; Warden of Merton College 1969-1984; Director, Leverhulme Trust 1985-1993; Knighted 1977
- Spouse: Eva Vago (married 1948-2009)
- Children: 2
- Awards: FRS; Davy Medal (1976); Corday-Morgan Prize (1954)
- Scientific career
- Workplaces: University of Oxford; University of Exeter
- Doctoral students: Ray Freeman; Ted Schaefer

Sir Rex Edward Richards FRS FRSC FBA (28 October 1922 – 15 July 2019) was a British scientist and academic. He served as vice-chancellor of University of Oxford and as a director of the Leverhulme Trust.

== Education ==
Richards was educated at Colyton Grammar School, and became the first pupil from the school to attend the University of Oxford when he went up to St John's College, Oxford in January 1942. He was awarded a first class Bachelor of Arts degree in 1945 and a Doctor of Philosophy in 1948.

== Career ==
After graduating, Richards stayed at the university as a Fellow in chemistry at Lincoln College from 1947 to 1964. In 1964 he succeeded Sir Cyril Hinshelwood as Dr Lee's Professor of Chemistry at Exeter College. In 1969, he became Warden of Merton College. Richards held the post of vice chancellor of the university from 1977 to 1981 and was Director of IBM (UK) Ltd from 1978 to 1983 and Director of the Leverhulme Trust from 1984 to 1993. He was president of the Royal Society of Chemistry for two years, and the Royal Society awarded him the Davy Medal in 1976 and the Royal Medal in 1986. He was knighted in 1977. He was also Chancellor of the University of Exeter from 1982 to October 1998. A painted portrait of Richards by Allan Ramsay hangs in the Senate and Council Chamber, Northcote House, University of Exeter, and another by Bryan Organ in Merton College, Oxford.

Richards chaired numerous committees concerned with higher education, including an independent enquiry to investigate factors that might deter young physicians and dentists from choosing clinical academic careers.

Richards maintained an interest in the art world as well; he was a member of the National Gallery Scientific Advisory Committee from 1978 to 2007 and its chairman from 1991 to 1993. In 1981, Richards became a founding member of the World Cultural Council. He was trustee of the Tate Gallery from 1982 to 1988 and 1989–1993, of the National Gallery from 1982 to 1988 and 1989–1993, and of the Henry Moore Foundation from 1989 to 2002; he was Chairman of the Moore from 1994 to 2001. He was also Chairman of the British Postgraduate Medical Foundation from 1986 to 1993.

The emperor of Japan Naruhito mentions him in his memoir, and when Emperor Akihito visited his son, then Prince Naruhito, at Merton College, Oxford, he was a very gracious warden and the emperor praised Sir Rex Richards. He was warden for only half his stay, but he was a big influence on him and his researches.

Richards's research work in the physical and theoretical chemistry laboratory at Oxford was primarily concerned with nuclear magnetic resonance; the magnet from his 1956 prototype is in the collection of the Science Museum, London.. His early work, leading to the award of a DPhil. in 1948, was on infrared spectroscopy and was supervised by Harold Warris Thompson.

== Awards and honours ==
Richards was elected a Fellow of the Royal Society in 1959, a Fellow of the Royal Society of Chemistry in 1970, and won the Davy Medal in 1976. His nomination for the Royal Society reads:

Distinguished for his work on nuclear magnetic resonance and its application to chemical problems. He has made outstanding contributions to the development of this technique, and was the first to apply it to the determination of unknown molecular structures. During recent years he has stimulated other work in the field by his own numerous applications. Earlier, he has done work of high quality in infrared spectroscopy, thermo-chemistry and magnetochemistry and has discovered important information about certain clathrate structures. He was awarded the Corday-Morgan Medal in 1954.

== Personal life ==
In 1948 Richards married Eva Vago; the couple had two daughters. Eva Richards died in 2009.

Academic offices
Preceded by Robin Harrison	Warden of Merton College, Oxford; 1969–1984	Succeeded by John Roberts
Preceded by Sir John Habakkuk	Vice-Chancellor of Oxford University; 1977–1981	Succeeded by Geoffrey Warnock
Preceded by 1st Viscount Amory	Chancellor of the University of Exeter; 1982–1998	Succeeded by Lord Alexander of Weedon
Professional and academic associations
Preceded by John Mason Ward	President of the Royal Society of Chemistry; 1990-1992	Succeeded by Charles Wayne Rees
