= John Ward (Australian footballer) =

Australian rules footballer

Personal information
- Full name: John Ward
- Nickname: Mick
- Born: 23 January 1928
- Died: 10 May 2017 (aged 89)
- Original team: North Essendon Methodists
- Height: 174 cm (5 ft 9 in)
- Weight: 75 kg (165 lb)

Playing career^{1}
Years	Club	Games (Goals)
1948	Essendon	1 (0)
- ^{1} Playing statistics correct to the end of 1948.

John Ward (23 January 1928 – 10 May 2017) was an Australian rules footballer who played with Essendon in the Victorian Football League (VFL).
