= John M. Ward =

American politician

John M. Ward (February 17, 1865 – February 10, 1948) was an American politician and farmer from Maine. A Republican, Ward served two terms (1928–1932) in the Maine House of Representatives, representing the town of Limestone, Maine in Aroostook County. Ward, who inherited the family farm in 1883 upon his father's death, was a lifelong farmer. He was also a longtime member of the Limestone Board of Selectmen. He died in Limestone on February 10, 1948, at the age of 82.
