= The Triumph of the West =

British television documentary series

The Triumph of the West

The Triumph of the West was a thirteen part BBC television series, with an accompanying book, written and presented by John Roberts, historian and Warden of Merton College, Oxford, and first broadcast in 1985. The series was subtitled A View of History by John Roberts.

The series focuses on the origins and evolution of Western civilization, and the transformative challenges and influence it has exerted on the rest of the world. The thirteen one-hour episodes examined the socio-economic, political, and cultural movements that helped shape world history. The programmes painted a broad canvas but avoided simplistic solutions, encouraging viewers to think and form their own conclusions.

== Episodes ==
- Episode 1 – Dangerous Gifts: the benefits and costs of Western influence
- Episode 2 – A New Direction: Influences from Ancient Graeco-Roman and Judeo-Christian Culture
- Episode 3 – The Heart of the West: The Middle Ages and Orbis Christiani
- Episode 4 – The World's Debate: Islam and Christianity
- Episode 5 – East of Europe: Byzantium and Russia
- Episode 6 – The Age of Exploration
- Episode 7 – New Worlds
- Episode 8 – Age of Light
- Episode 9 – Monuments to Progress: The Long Nineteenth Century
- Episode 10 – India: The Ironies of Empire
- Episode 11 – The East is Red: China in the Twentieth Century
- Episode 12 – The Decline of the West (Two World Wars and The Great Depression)
- Episode 13 – Capitulations: Third World countries learn the price of dependency on the West

== Reception ==
In his Guardian obituary of Roberts, fellow historian Jeremy Black noted that "Far from offering attractive simplicities, [Roberts] treated his audience as intelligent, and offered food for thought." In a critical article in The New York Times, John Corry thought that some of Roberts's argument was idiosyncratic, while noting that the opening episode "concludes with Mr. Roberts walking by the sea, wondering why no Arab dhows or Chinese junks have ever docked in the British port of Southampton. At least it is a provocative question."

== See also ==
- People's Century
- Andrew Marr's History of Modern Britain
- A History of Britain
