= Robin Harrison =

Alick Robin Walsham Harrison CBE (15 November 1900 – 18 May 1969) was an English academic, Warden of Merton College, Oxford, from 1963 until his death in 1969.

== Life ==
Robin Harrison was born on 15 November 1900 in Hambledon, Surrey and was educated at Haileybury and Merton College, Oxford. He became a master at Westminster School and returned to Merton in 1930. In 1932 he married Margaret, eldest daughter of Sir David Ross. He was a nephew of Sir Francis Younghusband and a cousin of Eileen Younghusband. At the start of the Second World War he entered government service in the Ministry of Food, where he became Deputy Director of Public Relations and Private Secretary to the minister Lord Woolton. He was awarded an OBE in 1943 and made a CBE in 1950. That year he returned to Merton to take up his old job as Fellow and Tutor in Ancient History. He served for a time as Domestic Bursar and was elected Warden in 1963. He was involved in university planning and helped in the foundation of two new colleges, Wolfson and St. Cross. He was made an honorary fellow of both.

He was the author of various academic books mainly dealing with law in the ancient world, including The Law of Athens. He was a man of "untiring scholarship, good sense, and sound judgment".

Harrison died on 18 May 1969 in Oxford.

Academic offices
Preceded by Geoffrey Mure	Warden of Merton College, Oxford; 1963–1969	Succeeded by Rex Richards
