= John Ward (vicar) =

Vicar of Stratford-upon-Avon from 1662 to 1681

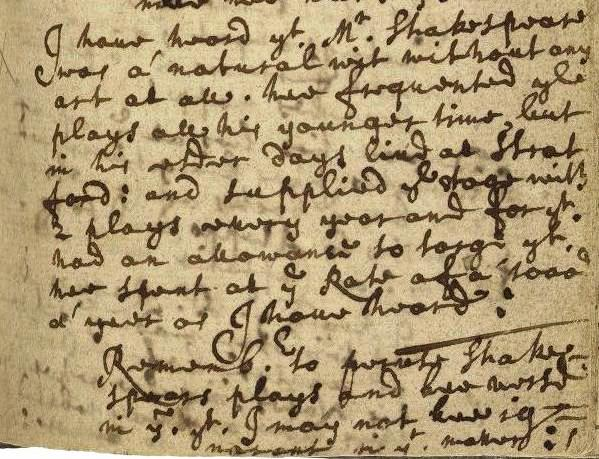
Image of bottom half of page 140 of John Ward's diary, written c. 1662–1663, containing the passage beginning "I have heard that Mr. Shakspeare was a natural wit...". Folger Shakespeare Library V.a.292.

John Ward (1629–1681) was vicar of Stratford-upon-Avon from 1662 to 1681, who ministered to Shakespeare's descendants. He is noted for his diary in which he recorded anecdotes about William Shakespeare, his family, and others.

Ward's diary extends from 1648 to 1679. The original manuscript, preserved in the Library of the Medical Society of London, was transcribed and published in 1839 by Charles Severn. It is now held by the Folger Shakespeare Library.

== Life ==
Charles Severn equated Ward with the a man born in 1629 in Spratton, Northamptonshire. Ward came from a family which had supported the Royalists in the English Civil War. His father was captured at the Battle of Naseby. Ward's diary indicates his continuing devotion to the Royalist cause. He received his M.A. in divinity at Oxford in 1652. While at Oxford he also made a study of medical literature. After graduating he lived in London.

In 1662, after the Restoration, he was appointed vicar of Stratford-upon-Avon by Charles II. This followed the removal of the Cromwellian vicar Alexander Bean after the Act of Uniformity. Bean appears to have set up a rival non-conformist congregation.

In addition to his duties as rector of the Church of the Holy Trinity Ward seems to have practiced as a medical doctor in Stratford, judging by entries about medicine in his notebooks. His diary indicates that he also intended to pursue philological studies; he promises to himself to learn Arabic, Old English and Hebrew.

Ward's diary indicates that he had a persistent cough and that he was physically frail for much of his time in Stratford. He died at the age of 52 on 7 September 1681 and was buried on 13 September. He was unmarried. His will leaves his property to his brother.

== Diary ==
The diary is really a set of notebooks which form part of a collection of documents containing medical and theological observations, drafts of sermons and anecdotes. Comments on Shakespeare appear sporadically. He also makes notes on the history and geography of Stratford and comments on current events.

=== Shakespeare references ===
In all there are five entries that refer to Shakespeare:

Shakspear had but two daughters, one whereof Mr. Hall, the physitian, married, and by her had one daughter married, to wit, the Lady Bernard of Abbingdon:...

This refers to the marriage of Shakespeare's daughter Susanna to local doctor John Hall, and of their daughter Elizabeth Barnard to Sir John Barnard of Abington Park.

I have heard that Mr. Shakspeare was a natural wit, without any art at all; hee frequented the plays all his younger time, but in his elder days lived at Stratford, and supplied the stage with two plays every year, and for itt had an allowance so large, that hee spent att the rate of 1,000 l a-year, as I have heard:...

The idea that Shakespeare was an untutored genius was common at this time. This is the only source for the claim that he had such a large income, which contradicts other sources. Karl J. Holzknecht describes the sum as "absurdly high".

Remember to peruse Shakespeare's plays, and bee much versed in them, that I may not bee ignorant in that matter.

This appears immediately below the previous passage. Both may have been written shortly after he was appointed to Stratford, suggesting that he had no special knowledge of or interest in Shakespeare before he was given the post, but felt he would be "expected to know something about the dramatist" as a local celebrity.

Shakespear Drayton and Ben Jhonson had a merry meeting and it seems drank too hard for Shakespear died of a feavour there contracted.

The "merry meeting" refers to a supposed night drinking with Michael Drayton and Ben Jonson. This is the only source for this account of Shakespeare's death. Some authors accept it, others are more wary. Gerald Eades Bentley wrote that it "is not necessarily accurate, but at least he was in a better position to get the facts, or an echo of the facts, than anyone else who has written on the subject."

Whether Dr. Heylin does well, in reckoning up the dramatick poets which have been famous in England, to omit Shakespeare.

"Dr. Heylin" is the scholar Peter Heylin. This remark is presumed to refer to the omission of Shakespeare from lists of writers in Heylin's book Cosmographie.

There is also the remark "A letter to my brother, to see Mrs. Queeny, to send for Tom Smith for the acknowledgment." "Mrs. Queeny" is assumed to be Judith Quiney, Shakespeare's daughter. This must have been written shortly before he arrived in Stratford. She died in the same year he was appointed as vicar, just before he was inducted. It is not known whether they met.
