= John Charles Miles =

English academic

Sir John Charles Miles (29 August 1870 – 12 January 1963) was an English academic, Warden of Merton College, Oxford, from 1936 until 1947.

== Education ==
Born in Notting Hill, Miles was educated at Shrewsbury School; and Exeter College, Oxford.

== Career ==
Miles trained as a barrister, joining the chambers of T.E.Scrutton, later a judge of the King's Bench Division (1910–16) and then of the Court of Appeal. He then joined Merton and was successively Tutor (1899–1930); Domestic Bursar, 1904–1923); Senior Research Fellow (1930–1936; and finally Warden.

He was also Legal Assistant at the Ministry of Munitions from 1915 to 1918; and Solicitor to the Ministry of Labour from 1918 to 1919.

Miles was a keen member of the Worshipful Company of Weavers.

== Bibliography ==
Cases illustrating General Principles of the Law of Contract. Oxford: Clarendon Press. 1923.
The Assyrian Laws. Oxford: Clarendon Press. 1935.

Academic offices
Preceded by Thomas Bowman	Warden of Merton College, Oxford; 1936–1947	Succeeded by Geoffrey Reginald Gilchrist Mure
