= Thomas Bowman (Merton) =

English academic (1853–1945)

Thomas Bowman (1853–1945) was an English academic, Warden of Merton College, Oxford, from 1903 to 1936.

== Education ==
Miles was educated at Bristol Grammar School; and Wadham College, Oxford.

== Career ==
He joined Merton as Fellow in 1877 and served successively as Principal of the Postmasters, Tutor and Dean before becoming Warden in 1903, a post he held until his death.

Academic offices
Preceded by George Charles Brodrick	Warden of Merton College, Oxford; 1903–1936	Succeeded by John Charles Miles
