= Henry Barton (academic) =

English clergyman and academic

Henry Barton (c. 1718 – 12 or 13 July 1790) was an English clergyman and academic who served as Warden of Merton College, Oxford, from 1759 to 1790.

The son of Henry Barton of Churchill, Worcestershire, Barton matriculated at Merton College, Oxford, in 1733, aged 15, graduating B.A. 1737, M.A. 1740, B.D. & D.D. 1759.

Ordained deacon in 1742 and priest in 1744, on both occasions by Thomas Secker, Bishop of Oxford, Barton held the following livings in the Church of England:

- Vicar of Eynsham, Oxfordshire (1761–1765)
- Vicar of Colyton, Devon (1764–1766)
- Vicar of Bampton, Oxfordshire (1766–1790)

Barton's sermon preached to the House of Commons at St Margaret's, Westminster in 1762 was subsequently printed.

He was elected Warden of Merton College in 1759, continuing until his death.

The Gentleman's Magazine considered Barton a humorous and cheerful man. However, Bernard W. Henderson's history of Merton College comments that the college at the time cannot be said to have "displayed any great intellectual vigour".

Barton died on 12 or 13 July 1790.
