= Johnny Ward (travel blogger) =

Northern Irish travel blogger (born 1983)

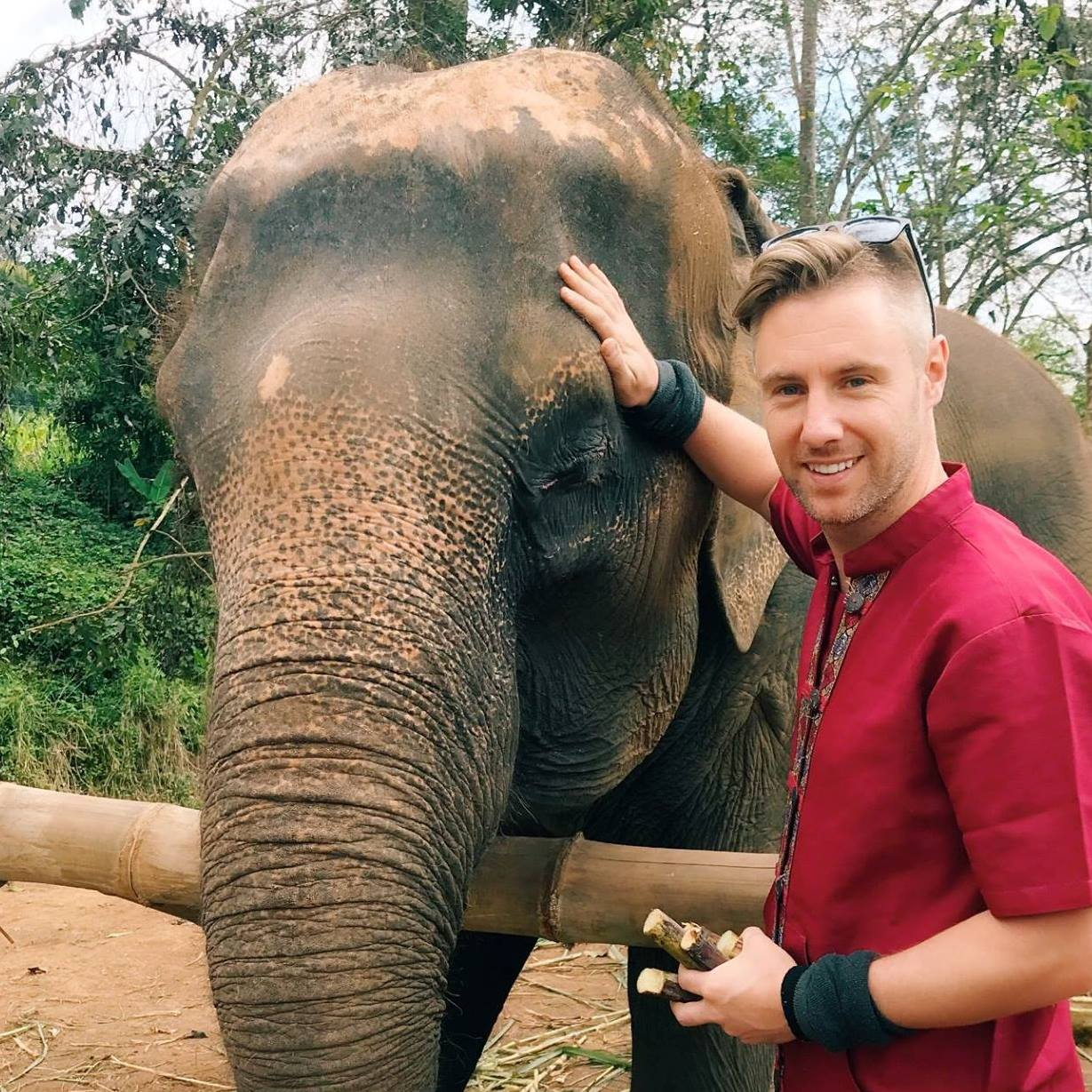
- Ward visiting elephant sanctuary in Chiang Mai, Thailand in 2019
- Born: 1983 (age 42–43); Galway, Ireland
- Citizenship: Irish, British
- Occupations: Entrepreneur; travel blogger
- Website: onestep4ward.com

Johnny Ward (born 1983) is a Northern Irish TV presenter, entrepreneur, adventurer, philanthropist and travel blogger known for visiting every country in the world, and being the first person to complete the Ultimate Explorer's Grand Slam.

== Early life and education ==
Ward was born in Galway, Ireland in 1983 to a single mother named Maura. His family moved to Kilkeel, Northern Ireland soon after, and Ward largely grew up there. His family often subsisted on welfare during his childhood. Ward studied international economics at university in England, graduating in 2006.

== Travel and career ==
After earning his university degree in 2006, Ward began his travels. His first destination was New York City where he spent a short time working as a summer camp counselor in the United States.

He returned to Ireland and took part in a medical research experiment to earn more money to travel. He then travelled to Thailand where he taught English for a year before moving to Sydney, where he worked as a telephone sales representative.

Dissatisfied with office work, Ward left his job and sought to make a living from travelling full-time. In 2010, Ward started a blog named "OneStep4Ward" to document his travels. During this period, Ward based himself in Bangkok, Thailand, and also began investing in property.

By August 2012, Ward had visited over 80 countries, and over 100 countries by the end of that year. In 2014, Ward was a founding member of the Professional Travel Bloggers Association. By 2015, he had earned a total of around $1 million and had visited 152 countries. Ward has recounted entering several countries through questionable or illegal means; it was reported that he "entered China illegally after a five-day trip up the Mekong River while stowed away in a cargo boat", that he was arrested after paying a smuggler to take him from Liberia to Ivory Coast during the Ebola epidemic, and that he was able to enter Yemen during an ongoing civil war by meeting a dignitary who "bribed Yemeni officials and I ended up hitching there on a cement cargo ship". Shortly after arriving in Angola, Ward witnessed a person being shot only a few metres away from his taxi cab, which quickly left the scene.

In 2017, Ward visited his 197th and final nation, Norway, chosen because its proximity to Ireland made it convenient for friends and family to join him for the occasion.

== Adventurer ==
Ward has since declared his intention to be the first person to visit every country, plus visit the North Pole, South Pole, and climb the Seven Summits. He has since finished 8th in the North Pole Marathon, and summited Kilimanjaro, Puncak Jaya, Aconcagua, Denali, and Mount Elbrus. Ward completed the challenge, reaching the South Pole in January 2024. Alongside this, Ward has also completed multiple long-distance ultra-marathons ranging from 100 km to 260 km, and competed in the Marathon des Sables in 2019. Ward is the founder of two annual endurance events: the Eye of the Sahara Ultramarathon, held in Mauritania, and the Highway to Hell Ultracycle, held in Turkmenistan.

Ward rowed across the Atlantic Ocean in March, April, and May 2021. He also spent 2 months attempting to climb Mount Everest in April and May and successfully summitted the world's highest mountain on May 17, 2023.

== Television ==
Ward is the host of Where Next with Johnny Ward, a travel series produced in Turkey and broadcast on TRT World. The first season, consisting of 12 episodes, aired in 2024 and featured Ward exploring different regions of Turkey, highlighting both well-known and lesser-visited destinations.

== Blog ==
Ward started his travel blog, OneStep4Ward.com, in 2010 whilst living in Australia, and soon began making a full-time income blogging. His blog is often listed as Ireland's leading blog, and one of the world's leading travel blogs.

Ward was nominated for the 11th Shorty Awards for 'Best in Travel'.

== Ultimate Explorers Grand Slam ==
Upon reaching the South Pole on the 12 January 2024, Ward became the first person in history to complete the self-proclaimed Ultimate Explorers Grand Slam (climbing the seven summits, reaching both the North and South Poles, plus visiting every country in the world). Reportedly, around 1000 people have climbed the Seven Summits. Reports vary from 250 to 500 people having visited every country in the world, but no-one has yet completed the set.

=== Countries visited ===
Country total	Years
197 Countries	2007-2017

=== The Seven Summits ===
Mountain	Height	Date climbed	Location
Mount Everest	8848 m (29,035 ft)	17 May 2023	Asia
Aconcagua	6,961 m (22,841 ft)	20 January 2023	S. America
Denali	6190 m (20,320 ft)	29 May 2022	N. America
Carstensz Pyramid	4,884 m (16,023 ft)	23 September 2019	Oceania
Mount Elbrus	5642 m (18,510 ft)	26 June 2018	Europe
Kilimanjaro	5,895 m (19,340 ft)	10 March 2013	Africa
Vinson Massif	4,892 m (16,050 ft)	7 January 2024	Antarctica

=== Other mountains ===
Mountain	Height	Date climbed	Location
Mount Kosciuszko	2,228m (7,309 feet)	31 May 2019	Australasia (Bass)
Mont Blanc	4,807m (15,771 feet)	27 August 2019	Europe (disputed)

=== Three Poles Challenge ===
Mountain	Date climbed	Location
Mount Everest	17 May 2023	Asia
North Pole	17 April 2018	Arctic Ocean
South Pole	12 January 2024	Antarctica

== Awards and nominations ==
Year	Award Show	Category	Nominee
2019	Shorty Awards	Best In Travel	Himself

== Philanthropy ==
Ward co-founded the non-profit Mudita Adventures (formally the Giveback GiveAway) in 2015 with a view to 'Change Travel. For Good.' Since then, Mudita Adventures has built schools, dormitories, playgrounds and clinics for developing communities in 10 countries, donating over $200,000USD.

In 2019, Ward helped his mother, who had previously been diagnosed with Parkinson's disease, raise £14,444 to climb Mount Fuji in Japan, with the funds going towards The Cure Parkinson's Trust.

In Quarter one of 2021, Ward rowed across the Atlantic Ocean, spending 51 days on a rowboat on a meat-free expedition. Raising over $20,000 for men's mental health and animal rights.

In November 2021, Ward took a group of people, including his mother once more, to partake in the Serengeti Marathon in Tanzania, raising $16,000 (£14,000) for the Michael J. Fox Foundation to help find a cure for Parkinson's Disease. In June 2023, Ward and his mother, Maura, undertook a 100 km tandem cycle through the Jordanian Desert, raising $15,000USD in order to help find a cure for Parkinson's Disease.
