= John Ward (cricketer, born 1946) =

Australian cricketer (born 1946)

Personal information
- Born: 15 November 1946 (age 79); Melbourne, Australia

Domestic team information
- Years: Team
- 1970: Victoria
- Source: Cricinfo, 5 December 2015

John Ward (born 15 November 1946) is an Australian former cricketer. He played one first-class cricket match for Victoria in 1970.

== See also ==
- List of Victoria first-class cricketers
