= Paul Connerton =

British social anthropologist (1940–2019)

Paul James Connerton (April 22, 1940 – July 27, 2019) was a British social anthropologist best known for his work on social and body memory.

== Biography ==
Born in Chesterfield to James Connerton, and his wife, Mary (born Perry), he was first educated at Chesterfield Grammar School for Boys, then studied history at Jesus College, Oxford. After Graduating Connerton went to Nuffield College to study the works of neo-Marxist philosopher György Lukács who is best known for his concept of Reification. His interest in Lukács motivated him to deepen his knowledge of literary theory so he enrolled at Gonville and Caius College, Cambridge and gained another first degree in English. From 1968 to 1972 he continued his research as an unofficial fellow of Caius. Connerton felt increasingly alienated from Lukács, canceled his dissertation project and instead turned to the works of the German neo-Marxist Frankfurt School around Horkheimer, Adorno, Benjamin and Marcuse, finishing this second dissertation project with his first published monograph The Tragedy of Enlightenment: An Essay on the Frankfurt School. Paul Connerton spent his career as a private scholar lacking the financial basis that usually enables for such a path. Later he became a research associate in the Department of Social Anthropology at the University of Cambridge. He was furthermore burdened by arthritis rheumatoid which caused much pain throughout his life and forced him to interrupt his studies and writing for treatments, therapies and long hospital stays. He was taken care of by his sister Clare Campbell and loyal friends.

He died in 2019 at the age of 79.

== Works ==
Connerton gained wide attention in the humanities and social sciences with his trilogy on social memory: How Societies Remember (1989), How Modernity Forgets (2009) and The Spirit of Mourning (2011). The main focus of these theoretical works is the interplay of cognitive and non-cognitive processes that preserve and create knowledge and images of the past, repetitive habitualized social practices and the socially shaped human body.

In his book How Societies Remember (1989) Connerton builds upon the basic assumption of scholars like Halbwachs, Hobsbawm/Ranger, Nora and Lowenthal “that there is some such thing as a collective or social memory“", but he takes a different position "to where this phenomenon, [...] can be found to be most crucially operative”. "The author argues that images of the past and recollected knowledge of the past are conveyed and sustained by ritual performances and that performative memory is bodily", an argument he takes up from Bergson, Proust and others. His goal is to show that "bodily social memory is an essential aspect of social memory, but it is an aspect which has until now been badly neglected". Connerton followed up this work with How Modernity Forgets (2009), which emphasizes what he calls "place memory," or memory that is dependent upon topography and particularly upon topography as it relates to the human body. Connerton argues that modernity is characterized by a particular sort of forgetting "associated with processes that separate social life from locality and from human dimensions: superhuman speed, megacities that are so enormous as to be unmemorable, consumerism disconnected from the labour process, the short lifespan of urban architecture, the disappearance of walkable cities."

== Selected publications ==
- 1968: "Alain Robbe-Grillet: A Question of Self-Deception". Forum for Modern Language Studies, vol. 4 (4), pp. 347–359,
- 1974: "The Collective Historical Subject: Reflections on Lukàcs' History and Class Consciousness". The British Journal of Sociology. 25 (2), pp. 162–178.
- 1976 (as editor): Critical Sociology: Selected Readings. Adorno, Habermas, Benjamin, Horkheimer, Marcuse, Neumann. Penguin, 520 pages.
- 1980: The Tragedy of Enlightenment: An Essay on the Frankfurt School. University Press, 176 pages.
- 1989: How Societies Remember. Cambridge University Press, 121 pages.
- 2009: How Modernity Forgets. Cambridge University Press, 149 pages.
- 2011: The Spirit of Mourning: History, Memory and the Body. Cambridge University Press, 190 pages. (Collection of Essays)
