= Philip Waller =

English historian (born 1946)

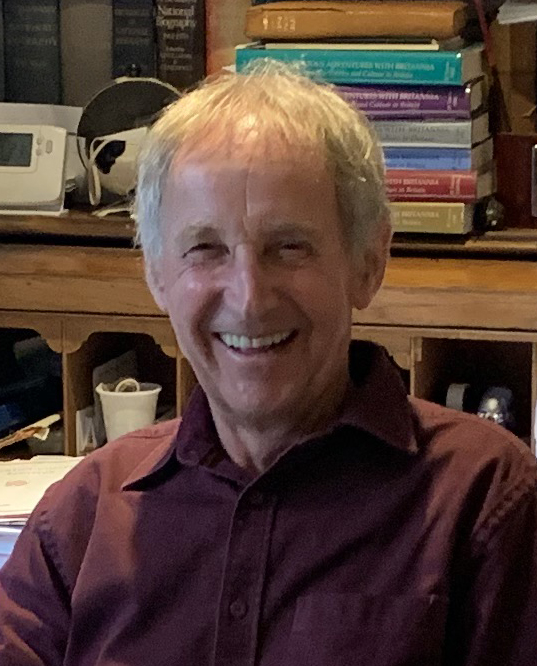
- Born: Philip John Waller; 1946 (age 79–80)
- Education: Magdalen College, Oxford
- Occupations: Historian; Emeritus fellow Merton College
- Known for: 19th-century History

Philip John Waller (born 1946) is an English historian and emeritus fellow of Merton College, University of Oxford. He is the author of a number of academic texts.

== Biography ==
Philip Waller was born in 1946, and studied history at Magdalen College, Oxford. He enjoyed a long career at Merton College, Oxford, where he was Tutor in Modern History from 1971 to 2008.

He also served as Senior Tutor and Sub-Warden of Merton, and held visiting professorships at the University of South Carolina, Columbia, in 1979 and Colorado College, Colorado Springs, in 1985.

Waller is the author of a number of academic texts, including Democracy and Sectarianism: A Political and Social History of Liverpool, 1868–1939, published in 1981, and Town, City, and Nation: England 1850–1914, published by Oxford University Press in 2006.

He has published many essays and articles in a variety of academic journals, magazines and symposia, and in 2003 he served as editor of The English Historical Review.

While at Merton, Waller led history reading parties in Cornwall, a tradition begun by his predecessor Roger Highfield in 1953. Even in retirement Waller continued to invite undergraduate historians to visit his home on Bodmin Moor.

== Selected publications ==
- Democracy and Sectarianism: A Political and Social History of Liverpool, 1868–1939, 1981
- Politics and Social Change in Modern Britain, Harvester, 1987
- The Chronology of the Modern World, Helicon, 1994
- Chronology of the 20th Century, Helicon, 1995
- The English Urban Landscape, Oxford University Press, March 2000
- Town, City, and Nation: England 1850–1914, Oxford University Press, 2006
- Writers, Readers, and Reputations: Literary Life in Britain 1870–1918, 15 May 2008
- A Dictionary of British and Irish History, with Robert Peberdy, 24 September 2020

== See also ==
- Roger Highfield
- John Roberts
