= Martin J. Taylor =

British mathematician

Martin Taylor FRS
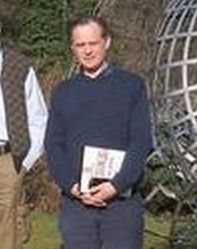
- Martin Taylor in 2002
- Born: Martin John Taylor; 18 February 1952 (age 74); Leicester, England
- Education: Wyggeston Grammar School for Boys
- Alma mater: University of Oxford (BA); King's College London (PhD)
- Spouse: Sharon Lynn Marlow (m. 1973)
- Awards: Whitehead Prize (1982); Adams Prize (1983); Knight Bachelor (2009)
- Scientific career
- Fields: Mathematics
- Institutions: University of Cambridge; UMIST; University of Manchester; Merton College, Oxford
- Thesis: Galois module structure of the ring of integers of l-extensions (1976)
- Doctoral advisor: Albrecht Fröhlich
- Website: www.merton.ox.ac.uk/people/sir-martin-taylor

Martin John Taylor FRS (born 18 February 1952) is a British mathematician and academic. He was Professor of Pure Mathematics at the School of Mathematics, University of Manchester and, prior to its formation and merger, UMIST where he was appointed to a chair after moving from Trinity College, Cambridge in 1986. He was elected Warden of Merton College, Oxford on 5 November 2009, took office on 2 October 2010 and retired in September 2018.

== Early life and education ==
Taylor was born in Leicester in 1952 and educated at Wyggeston Grammar School. He gained a first class degree from the University of Oxford where he was a student of Pembroke College, Oxford in 1973, and a PhD from King's College London with a thesis on Galois representations in 1976 supervised by Albrecht Fröhlich.

== Career and Research ==
Taylor's early research investigated various properties and structures of algebraic numbers. In 1981 he proved the Fröhlich conjecture relating the symmetries of algebraic integers to the behaviour of certain analytic functions called Artin L-functions. More recently his research has led him to study various aspects of arithmetic geometry: in particular, he and his collaborators have demonstrated how geometric properties of zeros of integral polynomials in many variables can be determined by the behaviour of associated L-functions.

=== Awards and honours ===
Taylor was awarded the Whitehead Prize by the London Mathematical Society in 1982 and shared the Adams Prize in 1983. He was elected a Fellow of the Royal Society (FRS) in 1996. He was President of the London Mathematical Society from 1998 to 2000 and in 2004 was appointed Physical Secretary and Vice-President of the Royal Society. Taylor was appointed Knight Bachelor in the 2009 New Year Honours. Taylor received an honorary Doctorate of Science from the University of East Anglia in July 2012.

== Personal life ==
Taylor's hobbies include fly fishing and hill walking, and he is a supporter of Manchester United F.C.. He married Sharon Lynn Marlow in 1973 and has four children.

Academic offices
Preceded by Jessica Rawson	Warden of Merton College, Oxford; 2010–2018	Succeeded by Steven Gunn (acting)
