= John Mason Ward =

British chemist

- Born: 11 October 1921
- Died: 30 April 2014 (aged 92)
- Known for: President of the Royal Society of Chemistry

John Mason Ward (1921-2014) was a British chemist and was president of the Royal Society of Chemistry (RSC) from 1988 to 1990. He began his career at North Fleet Paper Mills in 1937 as an industrial chemist. In 1948 he received a degree in chemistry from the University of London and went on to work as a chemist in the power industry.

Ward became head of chemistry at the now defunct Central Electricity Research Laboratory (CERL) in 1962. There he, together with his team, investigated all aspects of the chemistry of power generation from corrosion problems in power station boilers to environmental pollutants in flue gases. He was awarded the Esso gold medal in recognition of his work on energy conservation research in 1977, the year he retired from CERL.

Ward died at the age of 92 in 2014.
