= George Burke (cricketer) =

English cricketer

Personal information
- Full name: George Humphrey Burke
- Born: 18 August 1847; Greenwich, Kent
- Died: 24 July 1920 (aged 72); Peckham, London
- Batting: Right-handed
- Bowling: Right-arm fast
- Role: Bowler

Domestic team information
- Years: Team
- 1877: Kent
- Only FC: 30 July 1877 Kent v Hampshire
- Source: Cricinfo, 9 March 2017

George Humphrey Burke (18 August 1847 – 24 July 1920) was an English professional cricketer. He played one first-class match for Kent County Cricket Club in 1877.

Burke was born at Greenwich, in what was then part of Kent, in 1847. He was the son of Edmund and Harriet Burke (née Humphrey); his mother was originally from Westerham and his father was a dock labourer, the family living in Greenwich and in Plaistow, Bromley during Burke's childhood.

A right-arm fast bowler, Burke was employed as a professional cricketer. He had a number of appointments throughout the 1870s, most notably at Prince's Cricket Ground and The Oval, as well as at Dudley, and was "in demand" as a ground bowler. He played club cricket in West Kent, and in his only first-class match, an 1877 fixture at the St Lawrence Ground in Canterbury, scored a total of nine runs and took four wickets for Kent against Hampshire. He stood as an umpire in eight first-class matches between 1875 and 1887.

In 1879 Burke married Mary Rivett at Camberwell. He took over the shop his mother ran at Eynesford in Kent for a time and later worked as a painter for a variety of railway companies―the family moving regularly throughout London as well as living in Cambridge for a time. Burke and his wife had seven children. He died at Peckham in London in 1920 from chronic nephritis; he was aged 72. He is buried in Camberwell Old Cemetery.

== Bibliography ==
- Carlaw, Derek (2020). Kent County Cricketers, A to Z: Part One (1806–1914) (PDF). Cardiff: ACS.
