= J. M. Roberts =

British historian (1928–2003)

J. M. Roberts CBE
- Born: John Morris Roberts; 14 April 1928; Bath, England, UK
- Died: 30 May 2003 (aged 75); Roadwater, Somerset, England, UK
- Education: University of Oxford (B.A.; M.A.; DPhil)
- Occupations: Historian, author, professor, TV presenter
- Known for: World history

John Morris Roberts CBE (14 April 1928 – 30 May 2003) was a British historian with many published works. From 1979 to 1985, he was vice chancellor of the University of Southampton, and from 1985 to 1994, he was warden of Merton College, Oxford. He also wrote and presented the BBC TV series The Triumph of the West, first broadcast in 1985.

== Biography ==
Roberts was born in Bath, the son of a department store worker and educated at Taunton School. He won a scholarship to Keble College, Oxford, and took a first in Modern History in 1948. After National Service, he was elected a prize fellow of Magdalen College, Oxford, where he completed a doctoral thesis on the Italian republic set up during the time of Napoleon Bonaparte.

In 1953 Roberts was elected a fellow and tutor in Modern History at Merton College, Oxford, and in the same year, he went as a Commonwealth Fund fellow to Princeton and Yale, where his interests broadened beyond European history. He returned to America three times as a visiting professor in the 1960s. In 1964 Roberts lectured for the British Council in India, and from 1966 to 1977 Roberts served as joint editor of the English Historical Review.

From 1979 to 1985 Roberts was vice-chancellor of the University of Southampton where he felt obliged to make unpopular cuts (Classics and Theology). Roberts could be an intimidating figure, even a "terrifying" one, but was described by colleagues as "a nice man, a very nice man, underneath it all".

Roberts did not hesitate to take on ambitious projects, and in 1976 he published The History of the World, regularly updated in later years and still in print today. The Times Literary Supplement described Roberts as "master of the broad brush-stroke", and in 1985 Roberts wrote and presented the thirteen-part BBC television series The Triumph of the West, a series about the evolution, shaping, and global impacts of Western Civilization, in which painted a broad canvas but avoided simplistic solutions, encouraging the audience to think and reach its own conclusions. Later he served as a historical advisor to the BBC series People's Century.

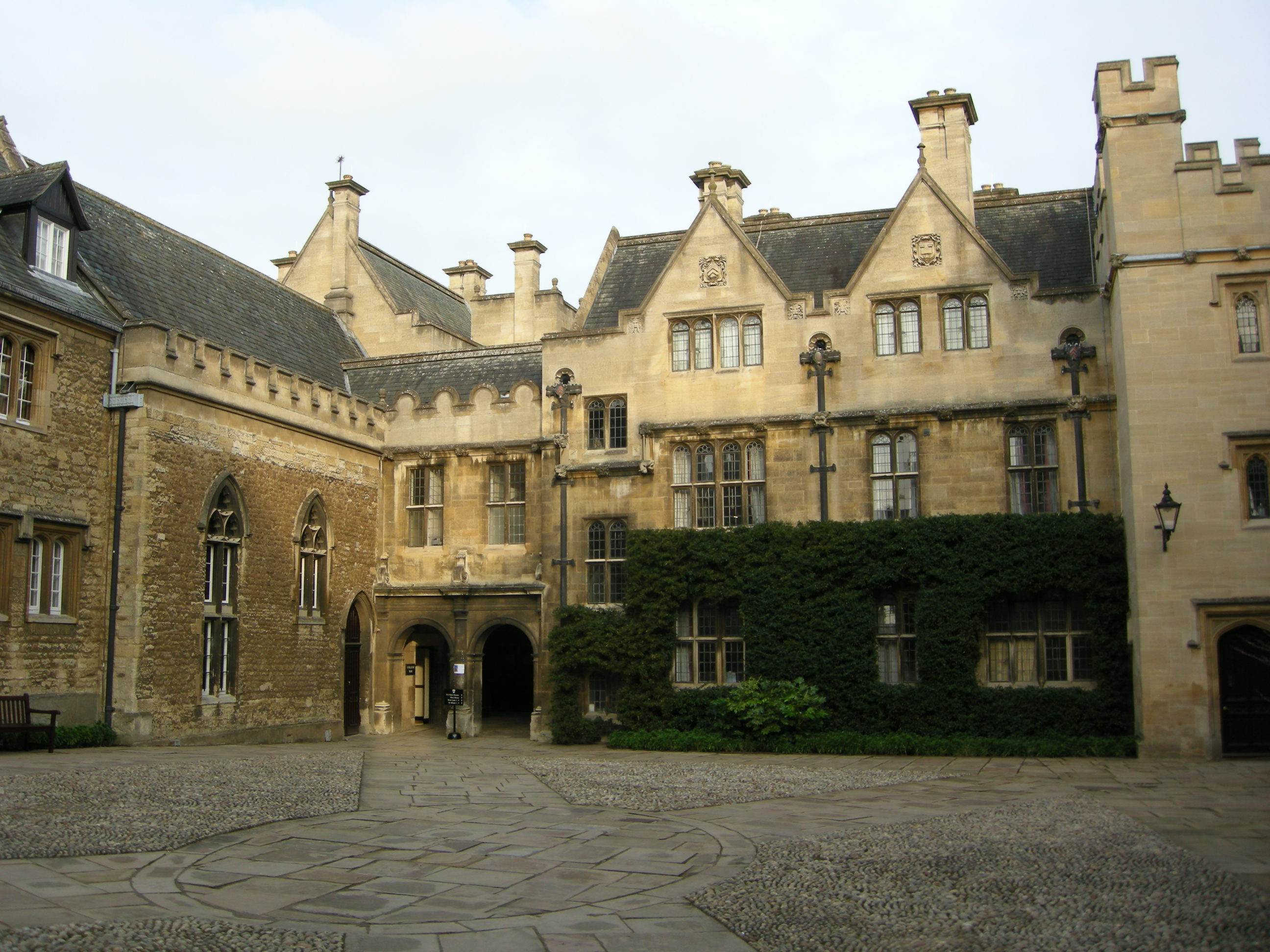
Merton College, Oxford, Front Quad

From 1985 to 1994 Roberts was Warden of Merton College, Oxford. At Merton he became an important figure in the expansion and development of postgraduate studies. He also took up other roles, serving as a governor of the BBC from 1988 to 93 and as a trustee of Rhodes House from 1988 to 94. In 1994 he retired and returned to his native Somerset.

In 1996, Roberts was appointed CBE for his 'services to education and history' and made a Cavalier of the Order of Merit of the Italian Republic in 1991.

Roberts died in 2003, at Roadwater, Somerset, shortly after completing the fourth revised edition of The New History of the World.

== Legacy ==
The John Roberts Memorial Fund was established in his honour at Merton College in 2003, with the aim of increasing the financial support available to undergraduate and graduate students. The college hoped that the first recipient would be a history graduate.

When Roberts' The Mythology of the Secret Societies was republished in 2008, the back cover contained the following message: "We are living at a time when conspiracy theories are rife and the notion of secret plans for world domination under the guise of religious cults or secret societies is perhaps considered more seriously than ever."

== Personal life ==
On 10 September 1960, at Milton Abbas, Roberts married (Mariabella) Rosalind Gardiner. The marriage was dissolved in 1964. At Oxford on 29 August 1964 Roberts married Judith Cecilia Mary Armitage, a schoolteacher, and they had one son and two daughters.

== Selected works ==
- Europe: 1880–1945 (London: Longmans, 1967. 2nd corrected and revised edition, 1970. 3rd edition, 2000 ISBN 978-0-582-35745-7)
- The Mythology of the Secret Societies (1972; reprint edition, Watkins, 2008 ISBN 978-1-905857-44-9)
- History of the World (New York: Knopf, 1976). ISBN 978-0-394-49675-7
- Revolution and Improvement: The Western World, 1775–1847 (London: Weidenfeld and Nicolson, 1976). ISBN 978-0-297-77048-0
- The French Revolution (Oxford: Oxford University Press, 1978). ISBN 978-0-19-289069-6
- An Illustrated World History (Harmondsworth: Penguin, 1980. 8 volumes)
- The Age of Upheaval: The World since 1914 (Harmondsworth: Penguin, 1981). ISBN 978-0-14-064008-3
- The Triumph of the West: The Origin, Rise, and Legacy of Western Civilization (London: British Broadcasting Corporation, 1985). ISBN 978-0-563-20070-3
- A Short History of the World (1993). ISBN 978-0-19-511504-8
- A History of Europe (New York: 1996). ISBN 978-0-7139-9204-5
- The Age of Diverging Traditions (London: Time-Life, 1998). ISBN 978-0-7054-3660-1
- The Age of Revolution (London: Time-Life, 1998). ISBN 978-0-7054-3690-8
- Eastern Asia and Classical Greece (London: Time-Life, 1998). ISBN 978-0-7054-3640-3
- The Penguin History of the Twentieth Century (1999). ISBN 978-0-14-027631-2
- Twentieth Century: A History of the World From 1901 to the Present (London: Allen Lane, 1999). ISBN 978-0-7139-9257-1
- The New History of the World (6th Edition, 2013 ISBN 978-0-19-521927-2)

Academic offices
Preceded by Laurence Gower	Vice Chancellor University of Southampton; 1979–1985	Succeeded by Sir Gordon Higginson
Preceded by Rex Richards	Warden of Merton College, Oxford; 1985–1994	Succeeded by Jessica Rawson
