= Kristin van Zwieten =

Legal academic

Kristin van Zwieten is the Clifford Chance Professor of Law and Finance at the Faculty of Law at the University of Oxford and the Gullifer Fellow at Harris Manchester College, Oxford. She was previously the John Collier Fellow in Law at Trinity Hall, Cambridge.

She is currently Director of the Commercial Law Centre, Harris Manchester College (which is affiliated with UNIDROIT) and was the Associate Dean for Equality and Diversity at the Oxford Law Faculty until 2024. She is also a founding editor of the Oxford Business Law Blog and regularly consults for the World Bank.

van Zwieten's scholarship focuses on corporate finance and corporate insolvency law. She is the editor of several texts on English and European cross-border corporate insolvency law. She has been editor of Goode on Principles of Corporate Insolvency Law since its fifth edition in 2018. Goode is regularly cited by the UK Supreme Court, Privy Council, Singapore Court of Appeal, and Hong Kong Court of Final Appeal and is regarded by lawyers as "a recommended acquisition for anyone interested in insolvency law from the practice, academic, or judicial perspective". Her article "Director Liability in Insolvency and its Vicinity" in the Oxford Journal of Legal Studies has also been cited by the UK Supreme Court in Stanford International Bank Ltd v HSBC Bank Plc.

van Zwieten is currently the principal investigator on the "COVID-19, public policy and commercial law" project at the University of Oxford alongside Professors Horst Eidenmüller and Oren Sussman. She is also working with Professor Jennifer Payne on publishing a book on "the changing landscape of English corporate insolvency and restructuring law" which seeks to bring together contributions from leading scholars across the UK, Europe, and the US.

== Selected publications ==
- van Zwieten, Goode on Principles of Corporate Insolvency Law (5th ed) (Sweet & Maxwell 2018)
- Bork and van Zwieten, Commentary on the European Insolvency Regulation (2nd ed) (Oxford University Press 2022)
- Cranston, Avgouleas, van Zwieten, Hare, and van Sante, Principles of Banking Law (3rd ed) (Oxford University Press 2018)
- Eidenmüller, Enriques, Helleringer and van Zwieten, COVID-19 and Business Law (Bloomsbury 2020)
