= Anne Davies (legal scholar) =

British legal scholar

Anne Davies FBA
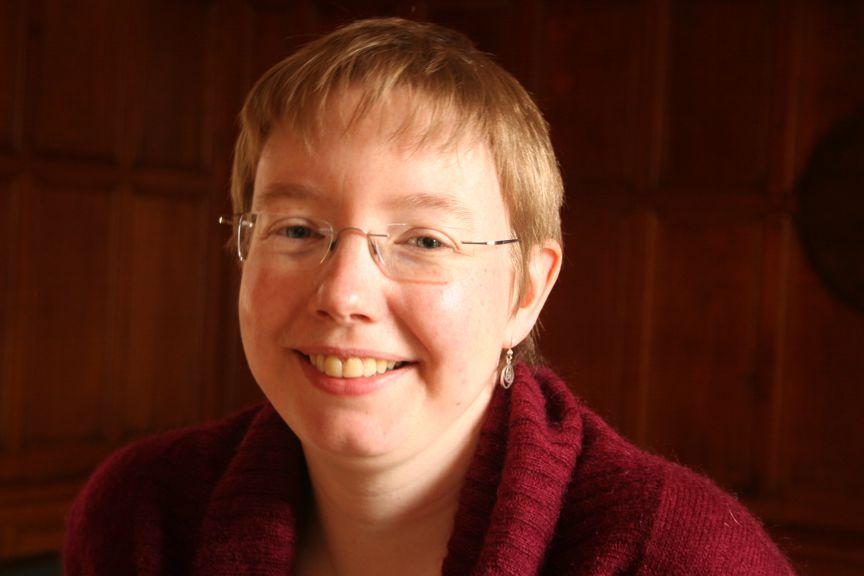
- Davies in 2007
- Born: 27 December 1973 (age 52)

Academic background
- Education: Lincoln College, Oxford

Academic work
- Discipline: Legal scholar
- Sub-discipline: Public law; employment law; government contracts
- Institutions: All Souls College, Oxford; Brasenose College, Oxford; Faculty of Law, University of Oxford; Blavatnik School of Government, University of Oxford

Anne Caroline Lloyd Davies FBA (born 27 December 1973) is a British legal scholar, who is Professor of Law and Public Policy in the Faculty of Law, University of Oxford and professorial fellow in law at Brasenose College, Oxford, She was dean of the Faculty of Law from 2015 to 2020. She is also a senior research fellow at the Blavatnik School of Government, where she chairs the Procurement of Government Outcomes Club. She is a former general editor of the Oxford Journal of Legal Studies. As of 2021 she is editor-in-chief of the International Journal of Comparative Labour Law and Industrial Relations.

== Biography ==
Davies was born on 27 December 1973 in Hereford, Herefordshire, England. She was a student at Lincoln College, Oxford, and won the Gibbs and Martin Wronker University Prizes for Law. She was a Prize Fellow at All Souls College, Oxford (1995 to 2001), during which time she completed her doctorate on contractualisation in the National Health Service.

After moving to Brasenose College, Oxford in 2001, she became reader in public law in 2006. She was awarded a title of distinction as Professor of Law and Public Policy in 2011.

She is a member of the editorial board of the Industrial Law Journal, the European Labour Law Journal and Current Legal Problems.

She is a non-executive member of the Board of the Parliamentary and Health Service Ombudsman, and a member of the advisory panel to the Welsh Language Commissioner, and was formerly an independent member of the council of the Advisory, Conciliation and Arbitration Service. As of 2021 she is Honorary Secretary of The Society of Legal Scholars.

In 2024, she was elected as a Fellow of the British Academy (FBA), the United Kingdom's national academy for the humanities and social sciences.

== Books ==
- Accountability: A Public Law Analysis of Government By Contract (Oxford University Press 2001)
- Perspectives on Labour Law (Cambridge University Press 2004, 2nd edition 2009)
- The Public Law of Government Contracts (Oxford University Press 2008)
- EU Labour Law (Elgar European Law Series 2012)
- Employment Law (Longman Law Series 2015)
- Valuing Employment Rights (Hart Publishing 2024)

Academic offices
Preceded by Timothy Endicott	Dean of the Faculty of Law, University of Oxford; 2015-2020	Succeeded by Mindy Chen-Wishart
Preceded by Ewan McKendrick	General Editor of the Oxford Journal of Legal Studies	Succeeded by Timothy Endicott
