= Gill Aitken =

Registrar of the University of Oxford

Gill Aitken CB

Registrar of the University of Oxford
- Incumbent
- Assumed office 2018
- Preceded by: Ewan McKendrick

Personal details
- Born: 23 March 1960 (age 66)
- Education: St Hugh's College, Oxford
- Profession: solicitor
- Awards: Companion of the Order of the Bath (2019)

Gillian Elizabeth Aitken, CB (born 23 March 1960) is a British lawyer, civil servant and university administrator. Since 2018, she has been Registrar of the University of Oxford.

== Early life and education ==
Aitken was born on 23 March 1960 to Bill and Pamela Parker. She studied philosophy and theology at St Hugh's College, Oxford, graduating with a Bachelor of Arts (BA) degree in 1982.

== Career ==
=== Early career ===
Aitken worked for McKenna & Co from 1986 to 1993 and was admitted a solicitor in December 1988. She left the private sector to join the Government Legal Service in 1993.

=== Senior civil servant ===
Aitken worked in the Department of Health (where she worked on NHS Foundation Trusts) until 2004, when she was appointed Director of Legal Services at the Department for Environment, Food and Rural Affairs (DEFRA). In March 2007, she was appointed Solicitor and Director-General for Legal Services in DEFRA, succeeding Donald Macrae. In 2009 she became the department's Director-General for Law and Corporate Services. In March 2010, she moved to the Department for Work and Pensions to be Director-General, Legal, a role which was expanded in October 2011 as Director-General, Professional Services. In February 2014, she was appointed General Counsel and Solicitor to HM Revenue and Customs (HMRC), and remained in the role until July 2018.

At HMRC, Aitken headed a team of 180 lawyers and 350 employees which was noted in The Lawyer for having an 80% success rate at trial and adding £20bn to the government's tax income in 2014; it reported that she was responsible for "implementing accurate risk-predictions for ministers, which allow in-house lawyers to use precedent as a type of barometer to determine the percentage outcome of specific claims."

=== University administrator ===
Aitken left HMRC when she was appointed Registrar of the University of Oxford in June 2018. In that capacity, she is "head of the central administrative services", with responsibility for the university's administrative services and governance. In 2019, she was also elected to a fellowship at St Hugh's College, Oxford. She is an honorary member of the Faculty of Law, University of Oxford.

== Personal life ==
In 1998, she married Robert Aitken. Together they have one child, and she also has two step sons.

== Honours ==
In the 2019 New Year Honours, Aitken was appointed a Companion of the Order of the Bath (CB), "for services to taxpayers and to social mobility".

Government offices
Preceded by Donald Macrae	Solicitor and Director-General, Legal Services, Department for Environment, Food and Rural Affairs (later Director-General for Law and Corporate Services); March 2007–March 2010	Succeeded by None
Preceded by Isabel Letwin	Director-General, Legal; Department for Work and Pensions (later Director-General, Professional Services); March 2010–January 2014	Succeeded by Claire Johnston (as Director-General, Legal Services)
Preceded by Anthony Inglese	General Counsel and Solicitor, HM Revenue and Customs; February 2014–August 2018	Succeeded by Alan Evans from January 2019; David Bunting acting in interim
Preceded by Ewan McKendrick	Registrar, University of Oxford; Since September 2018	Incumbent
