= Timothy Endicott =

Professor of law

Timothy Endicott (born 9 July 1960) is a Canadian legal scholar and philosopher specializing in constitutional law and language and law. He is the Vinerian Professor of English Law at the University of Oxford, and a fellow of All Souls College, Oxford.

From October 2007 to September 2015, he served for two terms as the first dean of the Oxford Faculty of Law. He was named to the Vinerian Professorship of English Law in 2020; he had been a fellow of Balliol College, Oxford prior to this from 1999.

== Academic career ==
After attending Upper Canada College, Endicott studied English and Classics at Harvard University, where he graduated in 1983 with an A.B., summa cum laude. He then obtained a MPhil in Comparative Philology at Oxford University in 1985 as a Rhodes Scholar. In 1988, he obtained an LL.B. from the University of Toronto and then returned to Oxford to obtain a DPhil in law in 1997.

Endicott was a distinguished visitor at the University of Toronto Faculty of Law in 2017 and 2021, and was general editor of the Oxford Journal of Legal Studies from 2015 to 2021.

== Works include ==
=== Books ===
- Vagueness in Law (Oxford University Press 2000).
- Properties of Law: Essays in Honour of Jim Harris, with Joshua Getzler and Edwin Peel (Oxford University Press 2006)
- Administrative Law, 5th edition (Oxford University Press 2021)

=== Articles ===
Law and Language

=== Lectures ===
Interpretation and the Rule of Law

Academic offices
New title	Dean of the Faculty of Law, University of Oxford	Succeeded by Anne Davies
