= Thierry Philipponnat =

French economist

Thierry Philipponnat is an economist specialising in finance and on the link between economic theory and practice. He is the Chief Economist of Finance Watch.

== Career ==
Educated in France and in the United States, he is a graduate of Institut d'Etudes Politiques de Paris and holds a master's degree (diplôme d’études approfondies) in economics.

Philipponnat was a banker and a financial markets professional for twenty years. In 2004, he became a member of the Executive Committees of Euronext and of the London Financial Futures and options Exchange (LIFFE).

Since 2006, he has been focusing on the study of the link between the economy, finance and society. He was a member of the Executive Board of Amnesty International France [archive] and became involved in different campaigns related to the impact of business on human rights. In 2009 and 2010, he represented Amnesty International with United Nations Secretary-General's Special representative on Business and Human Rights John Ruggie and with the European Commission on Corporate Social responsibility issues.

He founded Finance Watch in April 2011 as an NGO specialised in financial regulation, and led the organisation until May 2014. During his mandate, he intervened on many occasions in parliamentary hearings in Brussels (European Parliament), Paris, Berlin and London, on European financial regulations issues, on national regulations dealing with banking structure, on the financial crisis and on the Libor and Euribor scandals and high frequency trading.

In April 2013, he received the Theodor Heuss medal in Stuttgart on behalf of Finance Watch in recognition of the work done for the public interest. On 7 October 2013, he gave the inaugural lecture of Université catholique de Louvain on the necessity to strike the right balance between private interests and public interest.

He was then the director of the economic think tank Institut Friedland, and a member of the French Sustainable Investment Forum, an organisation that he chaired between June 2015 and June 2017.

In 2019, he joined Finance Watch again as Head of Research and Advocacy, where his research has since focused on the link between prudential regulation, financial stability and the economy, on the impact of climate change on financial stability, on sustainable finance, on developing sustainable fiscal policies, and on designing a social taxonomy aimed at promoting an inclusive and socially sustainable economy.

He held a non executive regulation mandate with French Prudential Supervision and Resolution Authority (Autorité de Contrôle Prudentiel et de Résolution) where he is a member of the Sanctions Committee, the Scientific Committee and the Climate and Sustainable Finance Commission. Between 2015 and 2022, Philipponnat also occupied a non executive part-time mandate as a member of Board of the Autorité des marchés financiers (France) (French Financial Markets Authority) and chair of the Climate and Sustainable Finance Commission as well as the Markets and Exchanges Consultative Commission. He was a candidate to become chair of the AMF in 2017, and resigned in 2022 from the AMF Board in response to a high-ranking civil servant's appointment to the AMF chair, first woman to occupy this position.

In January 2020 he became a member of the European Commission's Technical Expert Group on sustainable finance and in October of the same year he was appointed as a member of the European Commission's Platform on sustainable finance and a member of the subgroup advising the European Commission on the extension of the EU Taxonomy of sustainable activities to social objectives.

In April 2021, the policy proposals made in his report Breaking the climate-finance doom loop were recognised by an international panel of 50 banks, NGOs, academics, regulators and investors as the most impactful and feasible to tackle the link between climate change and financial instability.

== Publications ==
- Artificial intelligence in finance - how to trust a black box? (Finance Watch, 2025)
- Europe’s coming investment crisis - What if capital markets could only meet a third of Europe’s essential funding needs? (Finance Watch, 2024)
- Finance in a hot house world - A call for economic models that do not mislead, scenario analyses that prepare the market, and a new prudential tool (Finance Watch, 2023)
- Regulating ESG ratings to strengthen sustainable investors (Finance Watch, 2023)
- The problem lies in the net - How finance can contribute to making the world reach its greenhouse gas net-zero target (Finance Watch, 2022).
- ISR et Finance responsable (Éditions Ellipses, co-author, 2022).
- Quel est notre futur? (NEF, Ramsay collective book, 2021).
- 10 Principles for a Sustainable Recovery (Finance Watch, 2020).
- Debt Sustainability and a sustainable COVID recovery (Finance Watch, 2020).
- Breaking the climate-finance doom loop (Finance Watch, 2020).
- How can safer banks hurt the EU economy? (Finance Watch, 2019).
- Negotiating Brexit (Beck-Hart-Nomos, 2017, collective book led by John Armour and Horst Eidenmüller).
- Le capital de l'abondance à l'utilité [archive] (Rue de l'échiquier, 2017).
- La capture [archive] (La Découverte, 2014, with Christian Chavagneux).
- La responsabilité des entreprises en matière de droits de l'homme [archive] (La Documentation française, 2008 – collective book led by Olivier Maurel – Université Paris XII).
- Cheminement en économie non-newtonienne [archive] (La Pensée universelle, 1990).
