= Mindy Chen-Wishart =

Taiwanese-New Zealand professor of law at Oxford University

- Born: Taiwan
- Title: Emeritus Professor

Academic background
- Education: University of Otago

Academic work
- Discipline: Law
- Sub-discipline: Contract Law and Contract Theory
- Institutions: Merton College, Oxford and National University of Singapore

Mindy Chen-Wishart is a Taiwanese legal academic. She is an emeritus professor of the Contract Law and was the Dean of the Faculty of Law, University of Oxford. She is currently the Provost's Chair and Professor of Law at the National University of Singapore.

She was a Fellow and Tutor in Law at Merton College, Oxford. She has written numerous articles on contract law and the law of obligations. Her work has been adopted by the Canadian Supreme Court and Court of Appeal of England and Wales.

== Biography ==
Born in Taiwan, she was brought up in New Zealand. She began her academic career at the University of Otago, where she completed a master's degree in 1987, then moving to Oxford, initially as a research fellow funded by the Rhodes Trust.

In 2021, she called for anti-racism training across Oxford University, relying on personal anecdotal material. She launched the #RaceMeToo Twitter campaign to draw attention to racism allegedly faced by affected academics.

A notable doctoral student of Chen-Wishart is Jodi Gardner, Brian Coot Chair in Private Law at the University of Auckland.

== Publications ==
- Unconscionable Bargains (Butterworths 1989) ISBN 978-0409788815
- Contract Law (OUP, 1st edn 2005, 6th edn 2018) ISBN 978-0198806356

Academic offices
Preceded by Anne Davies	Dean of the Faculty of Law, University of Oxford; 2020-2023	Succeeded by John Armour
