= John Veale =

English composer (1922–2006)

- Born: John Douglas Louis Veale; 15 June 1922; Shortlands, Bromley, London, England
- Died: 16 November 2006 (aged 84); Bromley, London, England
- Occupation: Classical composer
- Parent: Douglas Veale (father)

John Douglas Louis Veale (15 June 1922 – 16 November 2006) was an English classical composer.

== Early career ==
He was born in Shortlands, Bromley, Kent; his father, the civil servant Douglas Veale, later served as Registrar of the University of Oxford (1930–1958) and received a knighthood. John Veale was educated at Repton and studied modern history at Corpus Christi College, Oxford (his father's old college). Discovering Sibelius and Shostakovich, and receiving encouragement from William Walton, Sir Hugh Allen and Humphrey Searle, he decided to become a composer, taking some lessons from Egon Wellesz.

Veale sketched out his first symphony during the war while serving in the Army's Education Corps. After demobilisation he returned to Corpus Christi for more composition lessons with Wellesz and counterpoint and harmony with Thomas Armstrong. While there he began composing incidental music for Oxford University Dramatic Society productions, in which Kenneth Tynan and Lindsay Anderson were involved. Between 1949 and 1951 he won a scholarship to study in California with Roger Sessions and Roy Harris (the latter's only English pupil). He composed Panorama as an orchestral tribute to San Francisco.

Veale had married Diana Taylor in August 1944. In September 1951 came the death of their four-year-old daughter Jane. The Elegy for flute, harp and strings was written in her memory, and was adopted and recorded by the Boyd Neel Orchestra the following year, with soloists Richard Adeney and Maria Korchinska.

== Composer (1950s-60s) ==
In the first half of the 1950s Veale's music was widely performed. Panorama was premiered by Sir Adrian Boult at the Elgar Festival, Malvern in 1951, and later at the BBC Proms in 1955. The Symphony No. 1 was premiered by Sir John Barbirolli at the Cheltenham Music Festival in 1952. The Clarinet Concerto had its premiere at the Royal Festival Hall in 1954, conducted by Sir Malcolm Sargent. The Metropolis concert overture was also premiered in 1955 by Sir Charles Groves.

From 1954 film scores took up most of his time, The Purple Plain being the first. From that score he derived his choral work Kubla Khan, effectively evoking the atmosphere of the East. Eight film scores followed, ending with Clash by Night in 1963. The following year he composed the Symphony No. 2, his largest purely orchestral work.

Unable to support himself and his family through composition work, Veale joined the Oxford Mail as film correspondent and sometimes music critic between 1966 and 1980, and also worked as copy editor at Oxford University Press (1968–1987). From 1965 until he began work on the Violin Concerto in the early 1980s he stopped composing altogether, and even stopped listening to music.

== Later career ==
After 15 years of silence, Veale returned to composition with the Violin Concerto, which was broadcast by the BBC in 1986 with soloist Erich Gruenberg and the BBC Philharmonic Orchestra, conducted by Edward Downes. There followed (among other scores) the massive choral and orchestral work Apocalypse (which remains unperformed) and the Symphony No. 3, completed in 2003, which received its broadcast premiere in the year of his death. The Chandos recording of the Violin Concerto with soloist Lydia Mordkovitch, issued in 2001, resulted in a further revival of interest in his music.

Veale wrote in a tonal idiom and felt that his early work suffered neglect in the 1960s and 1970s under the avant garde musical regime at the BBC and its Director of Music William Glock. He died in Bromley, (a south-eastern suburb of London) on 16 November 2006 after a struggle with prostate cancer.

== Recordings ==
- Paul Dean recorded the Clarinet Concerto with the Queensland Symphony Orchestra in 1999.
- The Violin Concerto is available on the Chandos CD label, played by Lydia Mordkovitch with Richard Hickox conducting the BBC Symphony Orchestra.
- The Symphony No. 2 has been recorded by the Royal Scottish National Orchestra, conducted by Martin Yates.
- There are also some chamber music recordings, including the String Quartet.
- Panorama, the Metropolis Overture and the Symphony No. 1 were broadcast on BBC Radio 3 in 2002 by the BBC National Orchestra of Wales, conducted by David Porcelijn to mark the composer's 80th birthday.
- The Symphony No. 3 was broadcast by the BBC in 2006 with the BBC Concert Orchestra, conducted by Barry Wordsworth.

== Selected works ==
Concert music

- Symphony No. 1 (1945–7, rev. 1951)
- Panorama for orchestra (1949)
- String Quartet (1950)
- Elegy for Flute, Harp and Strings (1951)
- Clarinet Concerto (1953)
- The Metropolis, concert overture (1954)
- Kubla Khan, for chorus, baritone and orchestra (1956)
- Symphony No. 2 (1964)
- The Song of Radha for soprano and orchestra (1966, rev. 1980)
- Violin Concerto (1984)
- Demos Variations (1986)
- Apocalypse for chorus and orchestra (1987–9)
- Triune, for oboe, cor anglais and orchestra (1993)
- Encounter for two guitars (1994)
- Triptych for recorder and guitar (2000)
- Symphony No. 3 (2003)

Film music

- The Purple Plain (1954)
- Portrait of Alison (1955)
- The Spanish Gardener (1956)
- High Tide at Noon (1957)
- No Road Back (1957)
- The House in Marsh Road (1959)
- Freedom to Die (1961)
- Emergency (1962)
- Clash by Night (1963)
- A Gift for Sarah (1988)
