= Caston (surname) =

Caston is a surname. Notable people with the surname include:

- Douglas Caston (1917–1996), Canadian newspaper publisher and politician
- Geoffrey Caston (born 1926), Registrar of the University of Oxford
- Leonard Caston (1917–1987), American blues musician
- Leonard Caston Jr., rhythm and blues musician
- Rodney Caston (born 1977), American systems engineer and writer
- Toby Caston (1965–1994), American footballer
