= Principles of Corporate Insolvency Law =

UK insolvency law textbook

Goode on Principles of Corporate Insolvency Law by Sir Roy Goode of the University of Oxford is a leading textbook on UK Corporate Insolvency Law. Since its 5th edition, it has been edited by Professor Kristin van Zwieten, the Clifford Chance Professor of Law and Finance at the University of Oxford. It is regularly cited by common law courts such as the UK Supreme Court (recently in BTI v Sequana), Privy Council, Singapore Court of Appeal and Hong Kong Court of Final Appeal.

== Outline of principles ==
Professor Goode's suggested ten principles of corporate insolvency law are as follows.

1. corporate insolvency law recognises rights accrued under the general law prior to liquidation
2. only the assets of the debtor company are available for its creditors
3. security interests and other real rights created prior to the insolvency proceeding are unaffected by the winding up
4. the liquidator takes the assets subject to all limitations and defences
5. the pursuit of personal rights against the company is converted into a right to prove for a dividend in the liquidation
6. on liquidation the company ceases to be the beneficial owner of its assets
7. no creditor has any interest in specie in the company's assets or realisations
8. liquidations accelerates creditors' rights to payment
9. unsecured creditors rank pari passu
10. members of a company are not as such liable for its debts

== See also ==
- United Kingdom insolvency law
