= Julie Maxton =

British lawyer and academic

Dame Julie Maxton DBE
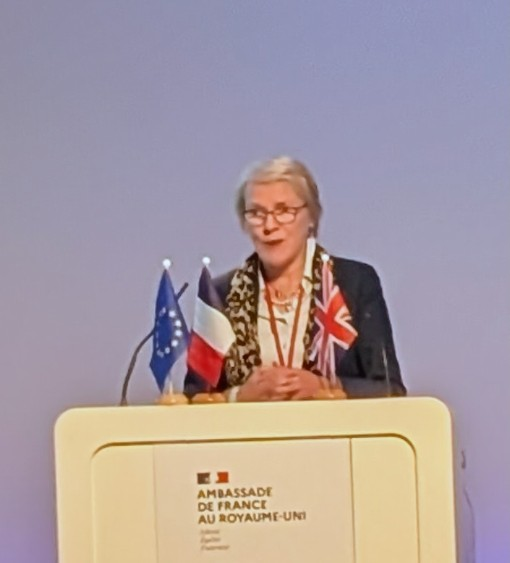

Executive Director of the Royal Society
- Incumbent
- Assumed office 2011
- President: Sir Paul Nurse; Venkatraman Ramakrishnan; Sir Adrian Smith
- Preceded by: Stephen Cox

Registrar of the University of Oxford
- In office 2006–2010
- Vice-Chancellor: John Hood; Andrew D. Hamilton
- Preceded by: David Holmes
- Succeeded by: Ewan McKendrick

Dean of Law of the University of Auckland
- In office 2000–2005
- Vice-Chancellor: John Hood

Personal details
- Born: Julie Katharine Maxton; 31 August 1955 (age 71) Edinburgh, Scotland
- Spouse(s): James Donald Carson, MBE (d. 2008)
- Education: University College London; University of Canterbury; University of Auckland
- Occupation: Barrister, legal scholar, academic administrator

Dame Julie Katharine Maxton DBE (born 31 August 1955) is a British-New Zealand barrister, legal scholar, and academic administrator. Since 2011, she has been executive director of the Royal Society.

She spent most of her career working at the University of Auckland, where she rose to be Dean of its Faculty of Law. From 2006 to 2010, she was Registrar of the University of Oxford.

== Early life and education ==
Maxton was born on 31 August 1955 in Edinburgh, Scotland. While at school, she played sport at international level, representing Scotland in lacrosse and hockey.

She studied at law at University College London, and graduated with a Bachelor of Laws (LLB) degree in 1976. She then trained as a barrister, and was called to the bar at Middle Temple on 27 July 1978.

Maxton moved to New Zealand after qualifying as a barrister. She undertook postgraduate study in law at the University of Canterbury, and graduated with a Master of Laws (LLM) degree in 1981. The same year, she became a naturalised New Zealand citizen.

At the University of Auckland, she also undertook postgraduate research and completed her Doctor of Philosophy (PhD) degree in 1991. Her doctoral thesis is entitled Contempt of Court.

== Career ==
Maxton began her academic career at the University of Canterbury. There, she taught within the university's School of Law as a lecturer. Upon marrying, she moved to a different university, the University of Auckland. This was unusual in that it is uncommon for academics to move between New Zealand law schools.

At the University of Auckland, New Zealand, Maxton's career was both academic and administrative. Joining the university in 1985 as a lecturer, she was promoted to senior lecturer in 1987 and later to associate professor. She spent periods as the Dean of Graduate Studies and was twice the acting Deputy Vice-Chancellor.

In 1993, she was appointed a Professor of Law. She was Dean of the Faculty of Law between 2000 and 2005.

During her academic career, Maxton was also a practising barrister. She concentrated on appellate cases. On 18 October 2012, she was made a Master of the Bench of Middle Temple.

From 2006 to 2011, Maxton held the position of Registrar of the University of Oxford. In that role, she head of the University of Oxford's administration. She was the first woman to hold the office in the 550 years since the position was first established. During the appointment, she was also a Fellow of University College, Oxford. She was succeeded by Ewan McKendrick in January 2011.

In 2011, Maxton was appointed executive director of the Royal Society. The Royal Society is the oldest learned society in continuous existence and serves as the academy of sciences of the UK and the Commonwealth. She is the first woman to be appointed to the position in its 358-year history.

== Personal life ==
Maxton was married to Major Jim Carson (1934–2008), the first leader of the New Zealand Army Band and later head of music at Auckland Grammar School. Together, they had one son. Carson was appointed a Member of the Order of the British Empire in the 1974 Birthday Honours, and died of cancer in 2008.

== Honours ==
In 2014, Maxton received a Distinguished Alumni Award from her alma mater, the University of Auckland. In 2017, she was awarded an honorary Doctor of Laws degree by the University of Canterbury.

In 2018 Maxton received an honorary doctorate from the University of Warwick.

Maxton was appointed Commander of the Order of the British Empire (CBE) in the 2017 Birthday Honours, for services to science, law, and education. She was promoted to Dame Commander of the Order of the British Empire (DBE) in the 2023 New Year Honours, for services to science and law.

In 2026, Maxton was elected an honorary fellow of Jesus College, Oxford.
