= James Nickel (academic) =

American philosopher and author

James W. Nickel

Academic work
- Discipline: Human rights law and theory, political philosophy, ethics, philosophy of law
- Institutions: University of Miami
- Website: www.jamesnickel.com

James W. Nickel is an American philosopher and author. He is a professor of Philosophy and Law Emeritus at the University of Miami Law School.

Nickel is most known for his book, Making Sense of Human Rights (1987, 2nd ed. 2007) and as the author of the "human rights" entry in the Stanford Encyclopedia of Philosophy. He has published more than 100 essays and reviews in philosophy and law, and his articles have been published in academic journals including the Columbia Law Review, Human Rights Quarterly, the Oxford Journal of Legal Studies, and Philosophy and Public Affairs. Moreover, his essay, Poverty and Rights, won the 2004 Essay Prize from the Philosophical Quarterly.

== Education and career ==
Nickel received his bachelor's degree from Tabor College and his PhD in philosophy from the University of Kansas. His first teaching job was in 1968 at Wichita State University. In 1982 he joined the University of Colorado Boulder, where he served as Professor of Philosophy until 2002, Director of the Center for Values and Social Policy from 1982 to 1986, and Chair of the Department of Philosophy from 1992 to 1996. From 2003 to 2008, he was Professor of Law in the Sandra Day O'Connor College of Law at Arizona State University. He then served as Professor of Philosophy and Law at the University of Miami from 2009 to 2018, and has since been Professor Emeritus there.

Nickel also held appointments as a visiting professor at the University of California Berkeley Law School from 1980 to 1982, the University of Utah Philosophy Department in spring 1986, the Pluricourts Center at the University of Oslo during the summers of 2014 to 2016 and Georgetown University Law School from 2008 to 2009.

== Awards and honors ==
- 1972–73 – Research Grant, National Endowment for the Humanities
- 1976–1977 – Fellowship, American Council of Learned Societies
- 1978 – Mellon Summer Fellowship, Aspen Institute, Aspen, CO.
- 1978–79 – Fellow, National Humanities Center, Research Triangle, NC
- 1981 – Rockefeller Foundation Humanities Fellowship, Rockefeller Foundation
- 1988–89, 1996–97 – Faculty Fellowship, University of Colorado
- 2004 – Visiting Fellow, Corpus Christi College, Oxford University
- 2013 – Theorizing Human Rights: A Conference in Honor of James Nickel, Duke University
- 2018 – Henkin Lecture, "What Future for Human Rights?’’, University of Miami Law School

== Bibliography ==
=== Books ===
- Making Sense of Human Rights: Philosophical Reflections on the Universal Declaration of Human Rights (1987) ISBN 9781405145343
- Making Sense of Human Rights (2007) ISBN 9781405145350

=== Selected articles ===
- Nickel, J. W. (1975). Preferential policies in hiring and admissions. Columbia Law Review, 75(4), 534.
- Munzer, S. R., & Nickel, J. W. (1977). Does the Constitution mean what it always meant? Columbia Law Review, 77(7), 1029–1062.
- Nickel, J. W. (1993). The human right to a safe environment: Philosophical perspectives on its scope and justification. Yale Journal of International Law, 18, 281.
- Nickel, J. W. (2012). Restraining orders, liberty, and due process. In A. Ashworth & L. Zedner (Eds.), Prevention and the limits of the criminal law (pp. 156–177). Oxford University Press.
- Nickel, J. W. (2016). Can a right to health care be justified by linkage arguments? Theoretical Medicine and Bioethics, 17, 293–306.
- Nickel, J. W. (2016). Two models of normative frameworks for human rights during emergencies. In E. J. Criddle (Ed.), Human rights in emergencies (pp. 56–80). Cambridge University Press.
- Nickel, J. W. (2022). Linkage arguments for and against rights. Oxford Journal of Legal Studies, 42(1), 27–47.
