= Brian Coote =

New Zealand legal academic (1929–2019)

Brian Coote CBE
- Born: 26 November 1929; Cambridge, New Zealand
- Died: 15 July 2019 (aged 89); Auckland, New Zealand

Academic background
- Education: Auckland University College (LLM); Queens' College, Cambridge (PhD)
- Thesis: Exception clauses: their legal effect in contracts for the carriage, bailment, and sale, of goods (1959)

Academic work
- Discipline: Law
- Sub-discipline: Contract
- Institutions: University of Auckland
- Notable works: Exception Clauses (1964)

Brian Coote CBE (26 November 1929 – 15 July 2019) was a New Zealand legal academic. He wrote the influential book Exception Clauses, published in 1964, and served as dean of the law faculty at the University of Auckland from 1983 to 1987.

== Early life and family ==
Born Cambridge on 26 November 1929, Coote was the son of Francis Edmond Coote, a bank manager, and Elivra Ethel Coote (née Meldrum). He was educated at Cambridge District High School, and went on to study law at Auckland University College, graduating Master of Laws in 1954. He was awarded a law travelling scholarship, and went to Queens' College, Cambridge, completing a PhD in 1959. His doctoral thesis, Exception clauses: their legal effect in contracts for the carriage, bailment, and sale, of goods, was awarded the Yorke Prize by the Faculty of Law at the University of Cambridge.

== Academic career ==
Coote returned to New Zealand and was appointed as a senior lecturer in law at the University of Auckland Law School in 1961. He quickly rose to the rank of professor in 1966, and was dean of the law faculty between 1983 and 1987. On his retirement in 1994, he was conferred the title of professor emeritus.

Coote's book, Exception Clauses, which was published in 1964 and arose from his PhD studies, was influential in jurisdictions across the Commonwealth, including the House of Lords. Regarded as a leading academic in the area of contract law, he was a member of the Contracts and Commercial Law Reform Committee between 1968 and 1988, and thus was responsible in part for reforms to contract statutes in New Zealand during that period. In particular, he is recognised for his contributions to the Minors' Contracts Act 1969, the Illegal Contracts Act 1970, the Contractual Remedies Act 1979, and the Contracts (Privity) Act 1982.

Coote continued to write in his retirement, including a history of the Auckland law school, Learned in the Law, published in 2009.

== Honours and awards ==
In the 1995 New Year Honours, Coote was appointed a Commander of the Order of the British Empire, for services to legal education. In 2009, he was elected a Fellow of the Royal Society of New Zealand, one of only a handful of lawyers to be so recognised. Coote was also an inaugural Fellow of the New Zealand Academy of the Humanities in 2007.

== Death ==
Coote died in Auckland on 15 July 2019.

== Legacy ==
Coote left $5,000,000 to the University of Auckland Law School. The University has stated that the income from the legacy would assist faculty graduates to study at a PhD level overseas and to support overseas graduates to study at Auckland as well as being used to improve research law school collections and facilities, fund postdoctoral fellowships and assist academic staff to undertake advanced research overseas. In 2023 Jodi Gardner was appointed as the inaugural Brian Coote Chair in Private Law.
