= Folliott Sandford =

British civil servant

Sir Folliott Herbert Sandford KBE CMG (28 October 1906 – 5 July 1986) was a British civil servant and Registrar of the University of Oxford from 1958 to 1972.

== Life and career ==
Folliott Herbert Sandford, the son of a barrister, was born on 28 October 1906. He was educated at Winchester College and New College, Oxford, where he obtained first-class degrees in Classics and in Law. He joined the Air Ministry as a civil servant in 1930, working as Principal Private Secretary to four Secretaries of State for Air between 1937 and 1940: Viscount Swinton, Sir Kingsley Wood, Sir Samuel Hoare and Sir Archibald Sinclair. In 1941 and 1942, he was attached to RAF Ferry Command in Montreal, Quebec, Canada; from 1942 to 1944, he was the secretary to the office of the Resident Minister for West Africa. He returned to the Air Ministry in 1944, rising from Assistant Under-Secretary of State to become Deputy Under-Secretary of State from 1947 to 1958. He was appointed a Companion of the Order of St Michael and St George (CMG) and a Knight Commander of the Order of the British Empire (KBE) in 1949. He became a Fellow of New College on his appointment as Registrar of the University of Oxford in 1958, succeeding Sir Douglas Veale, and held both positions until retiring in 1972. On his retirement, he was appointed an Honorary Fellow of New College and Wolfson College and was awarded an honorary doctorate by the university. He was Master of the Skinners' Company from 1975 to 1976. He was twice married: to Gwendoline (née Masters) from 1935 until her death in 1977, and then to Peggy Young (née Odgear) from 1982 until her death in 1984. Sandford died on 5 July 1986. The historian Brian Harrison describes him as "unobtrusively providing expertise and continuity" and a hard worker, but one who "lacked Veale's vision and sense of proportion" and who suffered from having to try to match the standards set for the role by Veale.
