= Ieke van den Burg =

Dutch politician (1952–2014)

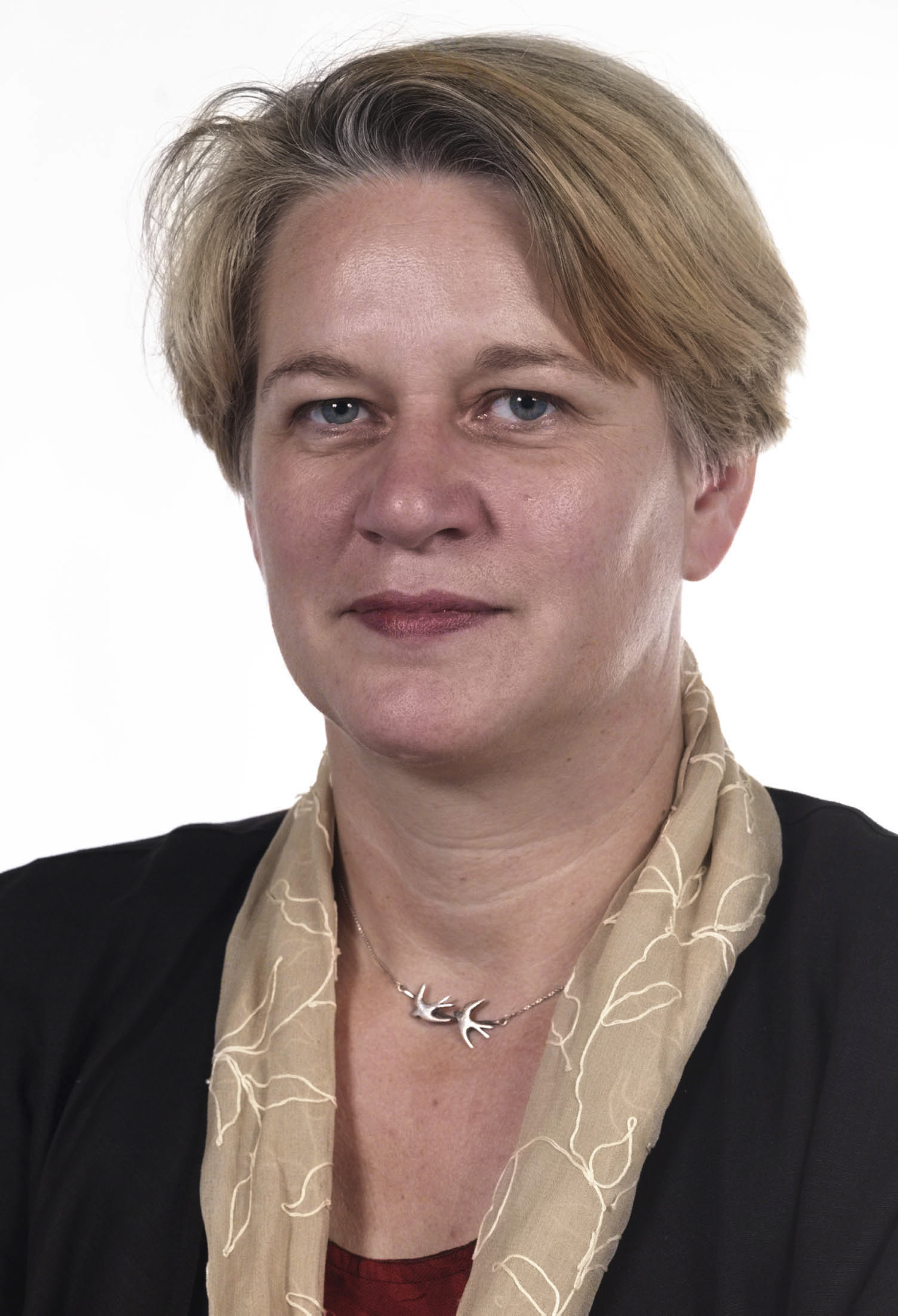
Van den Burg in 1999

Ieke van den Burg (Dutch pronunciation: [ˈikə vɑn də(m) ˈbʏr(ə)x]; (Note: In isolation, den is pronounced [dɛn].) March 1952 – 28 September 2014) was a Dutch politician and a Member of the European Parliament (MEP).

Van den Burg was born in Apeldoorn, Gelderland. She was a member of the Labour Party, which is part of the Party of European Socialists, and sat on the European Parliament's Committee on Economic and Monetary Affairs. She was also a substitute for the Committee on the Internal Market and Consumer Protection and a member of the delegation for relations with Australia and New Zealand.

From 2011 to 2014, van den Burg chaired the Brussels-based NGO Finance Watch and was a member of the European Systemic Risk Board's Advisory Scientific Committee. In recognition of her contribution, the European Systemic Risk Board has established an annual research prize dedicated to Ieke van den Burg's memory.

Van den Burg died 28 September 2014 in Amsterdam.

== Career ==
- First degree in psychology (1974)
- Various diplomas in graphics (1976–1983)
- Training and work in the graphics sector (1976–1983)
- Policy adviser, Printing and Paper Union, FNV (Netherlands Trade Union Confederation) and the FNV Women's Secretariat (1984–1990)
- Administrator, FNV (1990–1997)
- Adviser, European Trade Union Confederation (1998–1999)
- Member, SER (Social-Economic Council) (1987–1997)
- Delegate to the ILO Conference (1990–1997)
- employees' spokeswoman on the Convention on Part-Time Work (1993–1994) and the convention on Homeworking (1995–1996)
- Member of the European Trade Union Confederation executive committee (1994–1997)
- Member of the Economic and Social Committee (including Chairwoman of the Social Affairs Committee and member of the Bureau) (1994–1998)
- Member of the European Parliament (1999–2009)
- Substitute member of the Convention on the Charter of Fundamental Rights of the European Union (2000)
