= Finance Watch =

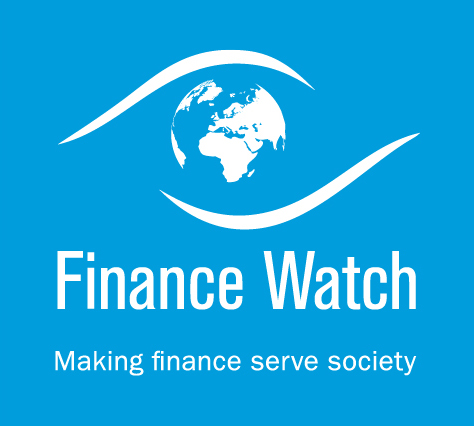
- Formation: April 2011; 15 years ago
- Type: Non-governmental organization
- Purpose: Promoting sound financial regulation
- Headquarters: Brussels, Belgium
- Region served: European Union
- Official language: English, French, German
- Secretary General: Isabelle Buscke
- Chair: Marek Hudon
- Vice-chair: Deepa Govindarajan Driver
- Website: www.finance-watch.org

Finance Watch is an independent European non-profit association that conducts research and advocacy on financial regulation. Finance Watch develops a public interest vision for financial reform and interacts with policymakers to bring about change. Based in Brussels, the organization focuses on financial regulation in the European Union.

Finance Watch was founded in 2011 following a call by members of the European Parliament to create a counterbalance to the financial lobby. Its mission is "to strengthen the voice of society in the reform of financial regulation" by conducting advocacy and presenting public interest arguments to lawmakers and the public as a counterweight to the private interest lobbying of the financial industry".

== History ==
Finance Watch was founded on 30 June 2011 as a consequence of a petition initiated in June 2010 by 22 members of the European Parliament, including members of all major political groups (ALDE, EPP, Greens-EFA, GUE/NGL, and S&D). This call for action was signed by another 140 elected officials from across Europe, and led to an exploratory project funded by the initiators, which in turn resulted in the founding of the General Assembly on 30 June 2011. Ieke van den Burg, a former MEP, was appointed chair of the board of directors and Thierry Philipponnat, a former banker and Amnesty International executive in France, became the Secretary General. From January 2017 to December 2025, the organisation was led by Benoît Lallemand. In January 2026, Isabelle Buscke assumed the role of Secretary General of Finance Watch.

== Activities ==
Finance Watch advocates for reforms to stabilise and democratise markets, redirect capital toward public goods, and protect against systemic risks.

The organisation’s research team analyses financial regulation and develops policy recommendations. These views are communicated to policymakers by the advocacy team, often in collaboration with aligned member organisations. The communication team ensures the wider public is informed.

Finance Watch’s policy experts cover 5 key policy areas: sustainable finance, retail and inclusion, financial stability & supervision, public finance, digital finance.

== Structure and financing ==
Finance Watch is an international association under Belgian law (AISBL), and has two types of members: individuals and civil society organizations. The latter include consumer groups, trade unions, housing associations, environmental NGOs, development NGOs and others. Each member has an equal vote at the organization's general assembly. To become a member, both individuals and civil society organizations need to prove to the organization's Board of Directors that they are independent from the financial industry. Individual members also need to qualify for membership by showing they have relevant experience and expertise. The members convene at least once a year for a General Assembly. During the year, the General Assembly is represented by the board of directors. The Board comprises eight Directors including six elected by and from the General Assembly (four Member organisations and two individual Members) and two independent Directors ("external personalities").

Members of the Finance Watch board of directors (as of May 2024):

- Chair: Marek Hudon, Université Libre de Bruxelles, Belgium
- Vice-Chair: Deepa Govindarajan Driver
- Treasurer: Andrea Baranes
- Sorcha Edwards, Housing Europe
- Laurène Collard, Centre des jeunes dirigeants
- Nadine Strauss, University of Oxford
- Étienne Lebeau, Centrale Nationale des Employés (CNE).

The organization's budget has as its main sources project funding from the European Union and grants from several charitable foundations as well as individual donations and members' fees and contributions.

== Principles ==
The declared mission of Finance Watch is "to strengthen the voice of society in the reform of financial regulation by conducting advocacy and presenting public interest arguments to lawmakers and the public as a counterweight to the private interest lobbying of the financial industry".

The organization states it follows six principles in the pursuit of this mission:

1. The role of the financial industry (allocating capital, managing risk and providing financial services) has strong public interest implications.
2. The primary role of finance is to allocate capital to productive use.
3. Finance must serve the real economy, not the inverse.
4. Banks are legitimate in pursuing profits to ensure their sustainability, but profits should not harm public interest.
5. Credit risk should not be transferred to society at large.
6. The real economy needs to have access to capital and financial services, in a sustainable, equitable and transparent manner.

== National partners ==
Finance Watch has national partners in Germany (Bürgerbewegung Finanzwende, headed by Gerhard Schick) and France.

== See also ==
- Bank regulation
- Financial regulation
- Lobbying in the European Union
