= Roy Goode =

British legal scholar (1933–2026)

Sir Royston Miles Goode CBE KC FBA (6 April 1933 – 24 June 2026) was an English academic commercial lawyer who was an Emeritus Professor of Law at Oxford and Emeritus Fellow of St John's College. He founded the Centre for Commercial Law Studies at Queen Mary, University of London. He was awarded the OBE in 1972 followed by the CBE in 1994 before being knighted for services to academic law in 2000.

== Early life and education ==
Goode was educated at Highgate School in North London, and obtained his law degree by external study through the University of London External Programme in 1954. He completed the LLD at London in 1976 and the DCL at the University of Oxford in 2005.

== Career ==
Goode was admitted as a solicitor in 1955; he was later called to the Bar at Inner Temple in 1988. Goode spent 17 years in private practice as a solicitor before turning to academia. While in practice, he wrote a series of legal textbooks. He began by writing a text on hire purchase as nothing had been written on the subject in the previous 20 years; he knew nothing about this area of law but researched it and produced a text which launched his legal writing career.

He joined Queen Mary University of London in 1971 as professor of law. He served from 1976 to 1980 as head of department. He served as the Crowther Professor of Credit and Commercial Law from 1973 to 1989. Then he left Queen Mary for the University of Oxford to become the Norton Rose Professor of English Law in 1990, serving until 1998; he was an emeritus professor of law at the university. Concurrently he served as a fellow of St John's College, Oxford between 1990 and 1998; later an Emeritus Fellow.

Goode was also a member of the Crowther Committee on Consumer Credit, the Monopolies and Mergers Commission and the DTI Advisory Committee on Arbitration. He chaired the Pension Law Review Committee, which was set up following the Maxwell scandal, and which led to a report on Pension Law Reform and the Pensions Act 1995. He was previously chairman of the executive committee of JUSTICE, the all-party human rights and law reform organisation, and a member of the governing council of UNIDROIT. He is also known for his writings on documentary letters of credit and demand guarantees; he has called these financial instruments "abstract payment undertakings".

He was made a Fellow of the British Academy in 1988. He was made a QC in 1990. He was made an Fellow of the Royal Society of Arts in the same year. He was made an honorary Bencher of the Inner Temple in 1992.

== Personal life and death ==
Goode was married and had one daughter. He died from heart failure on 24 June 2026, at the age of 93.

== Publications ==
- Introduction by Sir Roy Goode: Routledge Handbook on Transnational Commercial Law (2025). ISBN 978-1-032-49647-4.
- — (2016). Commercial Law. Fully revised by Ewan McKendrick. (5th ed.). LexisNexis UK. ISBN 978-1-40579861-7.
- Consumer Credit Law and Practice (General Editor)
- Consumer Credit Reports (General Editor)
- — (2011). Stevens, Robert (ed.). Principles of Corporate Insolvency Law (4th ed.). Thomson Sweet & Maxwell. ISBN 978-0-42196610-9.
- — (2013). Gullifer, Louise (ed.). Goode on Legal Problems of Credit and Security (5th ed.). Thomson Sweet & Maxwell. ISBN 978-0-41404802-7.
- Payment Obligations in Commercial and Financial Transactions
- My Engagement with European and International Commercial Law: An Errant Scholar's Reflections. Zeitschrift für europäisches Privatrecht, 28, 833 - 855 (2020).
