= Lydia Mordkovitch =

Russian violinist (1944–2014)

- Born: Lydia Shtimerman; 30 April 1944; Saratov, Russia
- Died: 9 December 2014 (aged 70); London, England, United Kingdom
- Occupation: Violinist
- Children: 1

Lydia Mordkovitch (née Shtimerman; 30 April 1944 – 9 December 2014) was a Russian violinist.

Lydia was born in Saratov, Russia, on 30 April 1944. She returned with her parents to Kishinev after the war. In 1960, she moved to Odesa, where she studied at the Stolyarsky School of Music until 1962, with Veniamin Mordkovitch (whose son she would marry). She then moved to Moscow where she studied at the Tchaikovsky Conservatory under David Oistrakh, later serving as his assistant from 1968 to 1970. During this period, she married and had a daughter, and won the National Young Musicians Competition in Kiev in 1967 and the Marguerite Long-Jacques Thibaud Competition in Paris in 1969.

In 1970–73, she studied at the Institute of Arts. She taught at the Israeli Academy of Music in Jerusalem in 1974–79, when she made her first appearance in the UK with the Hallé Orchestra. She settled permanently in the UK in 1980. Her marriage ended during this period. Her United States debut was in 1982 with Georg Solti and the Chicago Symphony Orchestra, when she performed the Glazunov Violin Concerto.

Mordkovitch recorded for RCA Red Seal and Chandos. Her Chandos debut recording included sonatas by composers such as Prokofiev, Schumann, and Richard Strauss. She was featured in over 60 recordings for Chandos, including works of J. S. Bach, Ami Maayani, Shostakovich and English composers such as Bax, Alwyn, Bliss, Howells, and John Veale.

Her Chandos recording of the violin concertos of Shostakovich won a Gramophone Award in 1990. She made numerous recordings with the conductor Neeme Järvi but plans to record the long-awaited Tchaikovsky Concerto were not realised. Mordkovitch became a professor at the Royal Academy of Music in London in 1995 as a specialist in Russian music.

== Death ==
Mordkovitch died of cancer in London on 9 December 2014, aged 70. She was survived by her daughter Ilana Mordkovitch-Roos, a pianist, and granddaughters Juliette Roos and Tatjana Roos, both violinists.
