= Jodi Gardner =

Professor of law at University of Auckland in New Zealand

- Born: 1986; Darwin

Academic background
- Education: Griffith University
- Thesis: How to approach high-cost credit: beyond freedom and protection (2018)
- Doctoral advisor: Mindy Chen-Wishart

Jodi Gardner is an Australian–New Zealand legal academic, and is a full professor at the University of Auckland, and is the inaugural Brian Coote Chair in Private Law. She has previously lectured at the universities of Oxford and Cambridge.

== Academic career ==
Gardner was born in Darwin, and holds a Bachelor of Laws and Bachelor of International Relations from Griffith University. She worked as a consumer advocate at a community law centre in Australia, and as a solicitor in litigation and banking. She completed a DPhil in contract law and consumer protection at the University of Oxford and a PhD at the University of Cambridge. She lectured in law at Oxford at Corpus Christi College, and at the University of Cambridge, where she is a Fellow of St John's College. Gardner joined the faculty of the University of Auckland in April 2023, relocating her family of seven from the UK. She was appointed as the inaugural holder of the Brian Coote Chair in Private Law, and describes herself as "a socio-legal community-focused relatively young mother of five", in contrast to Coote, who "represented the traditional standard orthodox private law".

Gardner's research focuses on the intersection of private law and social policy. She is interested in topics such as fair and transparent lending, and social welfare. Prompted by her experiences as a consumer and insurance lawyer during the Brisbane floods of 2010–11, she became interested in how private law structures can maintain or worsen inequality. She is part of a research project investigating consumer understanding of class action lawsuits and legal costs.

Gardner has been a visiting fellow at Princeton University's Woodrow Wilson School of International and Public Policy, Columbia Law School, the Max Planck institute for Comparative and International Private Law, and at the University of Birmingham. She holds a position as an adjunct research fellow at the National University of Singapore.

== Selected works ==
- Gardner, Jodi; Gray, Mia; Moser, Katharina, eds. (2020). Debt and Austerity: Implications of the Financial Crisis. Edward Elgar Publishing. ISBN 978-1-83910-434-3.
- Gardner, Jodi (13 May 2024). "NZ's big chill was an early winter warning: power should be subsidised for struggling households". The Conversation.
- Gardner, Jodi (2023). "Rethinking risk-taking: the death of Volenti?". Cambridge Law Journal. 82 (1): 110–137. doi:10.1017/s0008197322000915. Wikidata Q126884477.
- Gardner, Jodi (2021). "Being Conscious of Unconscionability in Modern Times: Heller v Uber Technologies". Modern Law Review. 84 (4): 874–885. doi:10.1111/1468-2230.12616. Wikidata Q126884478.
- Gardner, Jodi (2019). "Does lawful act duress still exist?". Cambridge Law Journal. 78 (3): 496–499. doi:10.1017/s0008197319000825. Wikidata Q126788845.
- Karen Rowlingson; Lindsey Appleyard; Gardner, Jodi (2016). "Payday lending in the UK: the regul(aris)ation of a necessary evil?". Journal of Social Policy. 45 (3): 527–543. doi:10.1017/s0047279416000015. PMC 4890339. PMID 27375304. Wikidata Q36960278.
