= Hogan Lovells Professor of Law and Finance =

The position of Hogan Lovells Professor of Law and Finance was established at the University of Oxford in 2007. It was created following the donation to the university of £103,007 by the London-based law firm Lovells (later part of Hogan Lovells, now part of Hogan Lovells Cadwalader). Originally designated as the Lovells Professor of Law and Finance, the post was renamed to its current title in June 2011.

As of 2015, the only holder of the professorship has been John Armour, who was appointed with effect from 1 July 2007. He holds the position in conjunction with a fellowship at Oriel College, Oxford.
