= Philip Bliss (academic) =

British academic and book collector

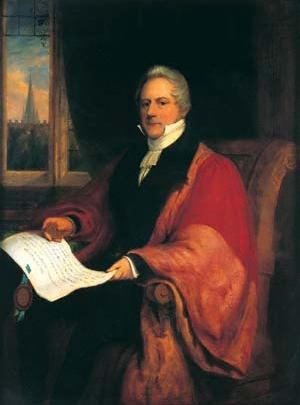
- Philip Bliss, in a portrait owned by Oriel College
- Born: 21 December 1787; Gloucestershire, United Kingdom
- Died: November 18, 1857 (aged 69)

Philip Bliss (21 December 1787 – 18 November 1857) was a British book collector who served as Registrar of the University of Oxford from 1824 to 1853, and as Principal of St Mary Hall, Oxford, from 1848 until his death.

== Life ==
Philip Bliss was born in Gloucestershire on 21 December 1787; his father (also called Philip) was rector of Dodington and Frampton Cotterel in the county. After studying at the grammar school in Chipping Sodbury and Merchant Taylors' School, London, Bliss moved to St John's College, Oxford, initially as a student and then as a Fellow from 1809. After ordination in 1818, he was appointed curate of Newington, Oxfordshire and later rector of Avening, Gloucestershire, but had little interest in parish work. He wrote for various publications and produced reprints of historical works. He worked at the Bodleian Library in Oxford from 1808 onward – he had had an interest in books and book collecting from childhood and accumulated a large collection, particularly relating to Oxford and poets of the 16th and 17th centuries – and began to publish his own works. He was also involved in the production of a new edition of Antony Wood's Athenae Oxonienses (1813 to 1820), although only the first volume of four was printed.

He spent some months in 1822, on the staff of the British Museum but returned to the Bodleian as junior sub-librarian at the prompting of his friend Bulkeley Bandinel (Bodley's Librarian 1813–1860), resigning in 1828 after his appointment in 1824 to the post of Registrar of the University of Oxford. He resigned as registrar in April 1853, before the Oxford University Act 1854 was implemented, with a pension of £200. He was also Keeper of the Archives from 1826 ("a post in which his penchant for accumulation seems to have impeded administrative efficiency", says one writer) and principal of St Mary Hall from 1848 until his death in the principal's lodgings on 18 November 1857. After his death, his correspondence was purchased by the British Museum, and his books were sold for a total of £5,672 14s (about £609,000 in modern money); the Bodleian acquired 745 of his books. According to one writer, his "prominence and diligence in university business and his polished manners made him the embodiment of the traditions of ancien régime Oxford". One historian of the University of Oxford, Charles Mallet, wrote that Bliss had "mourned over the old traditions which were perishing. But he retained to the last a certain sweet, old-fashioned courtesy, and a punctual and orderly devotion to his duties, which had not always marked the older ways."

Bliss played an important role in the development of the Oxford Union. Since 1829 the Oxford Union had rented premises above Wyatt's Rooms in Oxford High Street. But as the Union membership grew the space became crowded and there was a felt need for the Union to have its own buildings. The problem was how to pay for them. It was Bliss who stepped in with a plan in 1848. Before becoming Principal of St Mary's he had been a Fellow of St John's, where he had known Henry Hayman, then a Fellow of St John's and Treasurer of the Oxford Union. Taking a concerned interest in the affairs of the Union, he presented Hayman in 1848 with his plan. First, he located a house and garden between Cornmarket Street and St Michael's Street that offered scope for new Union buildings. Second, to raise the necessary funds he proposed that all members of Oxford University be entitled to buy life-membership of the Union for £10 (something like £800 today). Third, he personally offered a loan on easy terms of £3000. The scheme was taken up by the Union. Funds came in quickly, the land was acquired, and in 1852 the Union took possession of it. In 1853 building work began. Bliss thus has fair claim to be the father of the Oxford Union Society as it exists today.
