= Minors' Contracts Act 1969 =

Act of Parliament in New Zealand

Minors' Contracts Act

New Zealand Parliament
- Royal assent: 29 September 1969
- Repealed: 1 September 2017

Repealed by
- Contract and Commercial Law Act 2017
- Status: Repealed

The Minors' Contracts Act is an Act of Parliament passed in New Zealand in 1969. It is one of a series of Acts of Parliament adopted from 1969 onwards, the "Contract Statutes", which made changes to the contractual aspects of the law of New Zealand.
