= John Armour =

British legal scholar

John Armour FBA
- Born: John Hamish Armour; 24 December 1971 (age 54); Nottingham, England
- Occupation: Legal scholar
- Title: Hogan Lovells Professor of Law and Finance
- Spouse: Rebecca Ann Williams (m. 2007)
- Children: 3

Academic background
- Education: Pembroke College, Oxford (MA); Yale University (LLM)

Academic work
- Sub-discipline: Company law Corporate finance Corporate insolvency Financial regulation
- Institutions: University of Nottingham; University of Cambridge; University of Oxford

John Hamish Armour, FBA (born 24 December 1971) is a British legal scholar. Since 2007, he has been Hogan Lovells Professor of Law and Finance at the University of Oxford, and a Fellow of Oriel College, Oxford. Previously, he was a lecturer at the University of Nottingham and at the University of Cambridge, where he was also a fellow of Trinity Hall, Cambridge. From 2023 he has been dean of the Faculty of Law.

== Early life and education ==
Armour was born on 24 December 1971 in Nottingham, England. He studied law at Pembroke College, Oxford, and graduated from the University of Oxford with a Bachelor of Arts (BA) degree in 1994, later promoted to Master of Arts (MA Oxon) as per tradition, and a post-graduate Bachelor of Civil Law (BCL) degree in 1995. He then attended Yale Law School where he completed a Master of Laws (LLM) degree.

== Academic career ==
From 1996 to 2000, Armour was a lecturer in law at the University of Nottingham. In addition, between 1999 and 2000, he was a research fellow at the Centre for Business Research, University of Cambridge. From 2000 to 2001, he was the Norton Rose Lecturer in Corporate and Financial Law at Nottingham.

In 2001, Armour moved to the University of Cambridge. He was a senior research fellow from 2001 to 2002. He was then a lecturer in law from 2002 to 2005 and, having been promoted, was a senior lecturer from 2005 to 2007. During his time at Cambridge, he was also a Fellow of Trinity Hall, Cambridge.

In 2007, Armour moved to the University of Oxford. On 1 July 2007, he became the first Lovells Professor of Law and Finance. That year, he was also elected a Fellow of Oriel College, Oxford. In 2011, the chair was renamed as the Hogan Lovells Professorship of Law and Finance.

Armour has held a number of visiting academic appointments, including Visiting Professor of Law at the Columbia Law School and Visiting Scholar at the Becker Friedman Institute for Research in Economics of the University of Chicago.

== Personal life ==
In 2007, Armour married Rebecca Ann Williams, Professor of Public and Criminal Law at Oxford. They have two daughters and a son.

== Honours ==
In July 2017, Armour was elected a Fellow of the British Academy (FBA), the United Kingdom's national academy for the humanities and social sciences.

== Works ==
- Kraakman, Reinier; Armour, John; Davies, Paul; Enriques, Luca; Hansmann, Henry B.; Hertig, Gérard; Hopt, Klaus J.; Kanda, Hideki; Rock, Edward B. (2009). The Anatomy of Corporate Law: A Comparative and Functional Approach (2nd ed.). Oxford: Oxford University Press. ISBN 978-0199565849.

Academic offices
New title	Hogan Lovells Professor of Law and Finance; University of Oxford; 2007 to present	Incumbent
Preceded by Mindy Chen-Wishart	Dean of the Faculty of Law, University of Oxford; 2023-	Incumbent
