= Douglas Veale =

British civil servant and university administrator

Sir Douglas Veale CBE (2 April 1891 – 27 September 1973) was a British civil servant and university administrator, who served as Registrar of the University of Oxford from 1930 to 1958.

== Early life ==
Douglas Veale was the youngest of three sons of a Bristol solicitor and his wife, Edward and Maud Veale. He studied at Bristol Grammar School and Corpus Christi College, Oxford, gaining a degree in classics in 1914. He had joined the Territorial Force on 17 September 1910 when he was commissioned as a second lieutenant in the 4th (City of Bristol) Battalion, Gloucestershire Regiment, having previously risen to the rank of cadet colour-sergeant in his school's Officers' Training Corps unit. He was promoted to lieutenant on 31 March 1911.

== First World War Service ==
Called up on the embodiment of the Territorial Force on the outbreak of the First World War, he served with 1/4th Battalion in France from 31 March 1915. He was promoted to substantive captain on 27 May 1915. He was invalided home and appointed adjutant of the regiment's reserve battalion on 27 July 1916.

== Civil Service ==
He stepped down as adjutant on 18 May 1917, and was then allowed to take up an appointment as a civil servant with the Local Government Board, later the Ministry of Health. He was private secretary to various Ministers of Health between 1921 and 1928, then private secretary to Neville Chamberlain, helping to implement the Local Government Act 1929. Brian Harrison recorded 3 oral history interviews with Veale, 2 in January 1969, and the other in February 1969, as part of the Suffrage Interviews project, titled Oral evidence on the suffragette and suffragist movements: the Brian Harrison interviews. In the interviews Veale recalls his civil service career and talks at length about Chamberlain. Veale was appointed commander of the Order of the British Empire (CBE) on 1 March 1929.

== Oxford Years ==
In 1930, Douglas Veale was appointed registrar of the University of Oxford, as part of the university's plan to improve its administration by making the post more important. Although he initially faced suspicion from the colleges of the university, who disliked centralisation, he made his reputation by hard work and sensitivity to the role of colleges. He was reported to write minutes of university council meetings in advance, knowing what the likely decision was going to be. His former position as a civil servant was useful to the university as his former colleagues became more senior and found themselves in influential positions.

He was knighted in the 1954 New Year Honours, receiving the accolade from the Queen Mother at Buckingham Palace on 19 February. He became an Honorary Fellow of Corpus Christi and of St Edmund Hall, Oxford in 1958, the year that he retired from his post; he was also awarded an honorary doctorate by the university. He was Secretary to the Oxford Preservation Trust from 1958 to 62.

His interests included walking and tennis. He was married with three children, including the composer John Veale. He died in Oxford on 27 September 1973.

== Commemoration ==
Douglas Veale is commemorated in stone on the east side of the passageway leading from the north side in the Old Bodleian Library quad, Catte Street, Oxford.
