= Horst Eidenmüller =

Horst Eidenmüller (born 23 October 1963) is the Freshfields Professor of Commercial Law in the Faculty of Law at the University of Oxford and a Fellow of St. Hugh's.

Eidenmüller was born in Munich, Germany. He is a graduate of LMU Munich and of Cambridge (LLM 1989). Prior to joining Oxford, Eidenmüller held professorships at the universities of Münster (1999-2003) and Munich (2003-2015). He was visiting professor at Cambridge (2007), Oxford (2009-2014), Harvard (2011), Tulane (2011), NYU (2013 and 2015), and Stanford (2015), as well as fellow of the Institute for Advanced Study, Berlin (2008-2009). Eidenmüller is a member of the Berlin-Brandenburg Academy of Sciences and Humanities (since 2008) and of the European Academy of Sciences and Arts (since 2016).

Eidenmüller's research focuses on commercial contracts, company law, insolvency law, and alternative dispute resolution. He is known for economic and empirical studies in these fields.

== Publications ==
- Regulating the Closed Corporation. de Gruyter, 2013, ISBN 978-3-11-028643-4 (co-author with Gregor Bachmann, Andreas Engert, Holger Fleischer, and Wolfgang Schön). German edition under the title Rechtsregeln für die geschlossene Kapitalgesellschaft. de Gruyter, 2012 ISBN 978-3-11-026926-0
- "Recht als Produkt", Juristenzeitung 64 (2009), 641
- "Abuse of Law in the Context of European Insolvency Law", European Company and Financial Law Review 6 (2009), 1
- Ausländische Kapitalgesellschaften im deutschen Recht. C. H. Beck, 2004, ISBN 978-3406525919 (co-author with Andreas Engert, Markus Rehberg, and Gebhard Rehm)
- Unternehmenssanierung zwischen Markt und Gesetz: Mechanismen der Unternehmensreorganisation und Kooperationspflichten im Reorganisationsrecht. Otto Schmidt, 1999, ISBN 3-504-06114-6
- Effizienz als Rechtsprinzip. Möglichkeiten und Grenzen der ökonomischen Analyse des Rechts. Mohr Siebeck, 4th ed. 2015, ISBN 978-3-16-153974-9
- Negotiating Brexit. Beck-Hart-Nomos, 2017, ISBN 978-1-50-991998-7 (co-edited with John Armour)
