= Registrar of the University of Oxford =

Senior official at the University of Oxford

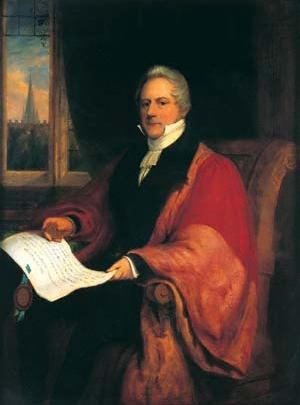
Philip Bliss, Registrar from 1824 to 1853

The Registrar of the University of Oxford is one of the senior officials of the university. According to its statutes, the Registrar acts as the "head of the central administrative services", with responsibility for "the management and professional development of their staff and for the development of other administrative support". The Registrar is also the "principal adviser on strategic policy" to the university's Vice-Chancellor and Council, its main decision-making body.

The university regards the role as having a 550-year history, as there are references in the records to officials carrying out the duties of a registrar in the 15th century, though the list of Registrars published by the university in the 19th century begins with John London, who died in 1508. As the administrative requirements of the university have increased, so have the number of staff employed in the university administration under the Registrar. The university decided to give the role increased importance after this was recommended by a commission in 1922.

As of 2015, there are 16 administrative sections for the university, and the heads of 12 of these report to the Registrar. About 4,000 of the university's staff of approximately 8,000 are under the Registrar's control. The current Registrar, Gill Aitken, took up her duties in September 2018. The previous Registrar, Ewan McKendrick, held the post from 1 January 2011; he is also Professor of English Private Law and was previously one of the university's Pro-Vice-Chancellors. His predecessor, Julie Maxton, was the first woman to hold the position; she was previously Dean of the Law School at the University of Auckland.

== History and duties ==
The list of former Registrars published by the university in the 19th century begins with John London, who died in 1508. Records show that there were people before London carrying out similar tasks in the 15th century, and the university regards the role as having a 550-year history. There is a record of a resolution by the university, of uncertain date in the 15th century, that a registrar or scribe should be appointed to draft letters, record the university's public acts, copy its documents, and record the names of graduates. The position carried an annual salary of four marks (£2 13 shillings and 4 pence); fees had to be paid to the Registrar by individuals obtaining their degrees or recording other permissions granted by the university. In 1448, a John Manyngham signed a letter for the university, and was permitted in 1451 to have a scholar make transcripts in the university's library; one historian of the university says that Manyngham may have been Oxford's first Registrar. John Farley, who signed his name in Greek letters as a sign of his erudition, carried out the duties from 1458 to 1464.

In 1588, the Registrar had to be paid four pence by a student wishing to be admitted to the degree of Bachelor of Arts, six pence for a Master of Arts degree and eighteen pence for a doctorate; in 1601, the fees for the bachelor's and master's degrees were raised to six pence and eight pence. In the 16th century, it was regarded as a lucrative position and Thomas Caius, who held the post for 17 years, reacted violently when the university voted to remove him from office for failing to carry out his duties for a year, leading to his temporary imprisonment. By the 19th century, the stipend was fixed at £600 and the Registrar no longer personally received fees paid by students.

The workload of the Registrar has increased over time as the university has increased in size and complexity. In 1914, the Registry had a staff of five; there were eight staff members in 1930 and forty in 1958. Typewriters were rare before 1925 and there was, until then, no diary of recurring dates, with everything depending (in the words of a later Registrar, Sir Douglas Veale, appointed in 1930) "on someone—generally the registrar's secretary—happening to remember." A commission headed by the prime minister H. H. Asquith recommended in 1922 that Oxford should improve its administration and that the Registrar should become a more significant figure; Veale's appointment was a recognition of this need. In addition, external pressures from the requirements of the University Grants Committee and other governmental funding mechanisms also required more work from the Registrar and staff. As the historian Brian Harrison put it, under Veale (Registrar 1930–1958), Oxford's administration was "edging ... slowly from decentralized amateurism towards centralised professionalism." However, Veale's successor Sir Folliott Sandford was "appalled at the amount of paper", which was "quite beyond [his] conception as a civil servant." The growth in Oxford's administration led to a move in 1968 to purpose-built accommodation in Wellington Square: until that time, the administration had been housed in the Clarendon Building in the centre of Oxford next to the Bodleian Library. As of 2015, there are 16 administrative sections for the university, and the heads of 12 of these report to the Registrar. In 2006, about 4,000 of the university's staff of approximately 8,000 were reported as being under the Registrar's control.

The university's statutes state that the Registrar is the "head of the central administrative services", with responsibility for "the management and professional development of their staff and for the development of other administrative support". The Registrar is also the "principal adviser on strategic policy" to the university's Vice-Chancellor and Council (its main decision-making body). Other duties include oversight of "the University's external relations", responsibility for "communications which express the general policy of the University", and control of the university's records and publications. Before 1997, when amendments were made to set out the modern duties of the post, the statutes relating to the Registrar were predominantly an outdated list of record-keeping duties; a requirement for the Registrar to live in an official residence provided by the university was deleted at this time. Julie Maxton (2006–10) was the first woman to hold the position; she was previously Dean of the Law School at the University of Auckland. She was succeeded on 1 January 2011 by Ewan McKendrick, formerly Professor of English Private Law at Oxford and one of the university's Pro-Vice-Chancellors. Some but not all of the Registrars have been appointed to a Fellowship of one of the colleges at the university; unlike some of the professorships at Oxford, the position is not linked to a particular college.

== Registrars ==
In the table below, "college" indicates the college or hall of the university (if any) at which the individual held an official position, such as a fellowship, when serving as Registrar.

Name	Position held	Education (Note: At the University of Oxford, unless otherwise indicated)	College	Notes
John London	?–08	Not known	New College	Little is known about London: he was a Fellow of New College and died in 1508; he is not the man of the same name who was Warden of New College from 1526 to 1542.
Ralph Barnack	1508–17	New College	New College	Barnack, a Fellow of New College from 1495 to 1517, was Vice-Chancellor of the University in 1519; he was later vicar of Adderbury in Oxfordshire and rector of Upper Clatford in Hampshire.
Thomas Fykes	1517–21	New College	New College	Fykes, a Fellow of New College from 1506 to 1524, is described as "tabellio or scribe, i.e. registrar, of the university". His name is sometimes given as "Fyghtkeys"; he was vicar of Heckfield in Hampshire until his death in 1548.
James Turberville	1521–24	New College	New College	Turberville, a Fellow of New College from 1512 to 1529, is described as "tabellio or scribe, i.e. registrar, of the university". After holding various parish positions in Sussex and Dorset and becoming a canon of Chichester Cathedral and of Winchester Cathedral, he was appointed Bishop of Exeter in 1555 by Mary I. He was deprived of his office under Elizabeth I in 1559 before being held captive in the Tower of London, where he spent most of the remainder of his life.
William Tresham	1524–29	Merton College	Merton College	Tresham, a Fellow of Merton College from 1516, is described as "tabellio or scribe, i.e. registrar, of the university". He was a canon of Christ Church and held various parish positions; he was also Vice-Chancellor of the University from 1532 to 1547, then again in 1550, 1556 and 1558. He was imprisoned in the Fleet Prison under Edward VI, restored to favour under Mary I but deprived of most of his church appointments under Elizabeth I for refusing to swear the required oath of supremacy.
Robert Tayler	1529–32	Merton College	Merton College and St Alban Hall	Tayler, a Fellow of Merton College from 1522, became principal of St Alban Hall (an academic hall associated with Merton) in 1530. He was later appointed to various parish positions in Sussex and made a canon of Chichester Cathedral.
Richard Smyth	1532–35	Merton College	Merton College	Smyth, a Fellow of Merton College from 1528, was appointed the first Regius Professor of Divinity in 1535 and became principal of St Alban Hall (an academic hall associated with Merton) in the following year. A theological conservative, he fell from favour under Edward VI and was forced from the professorship in 1548. After Mary I came to the throne, Smyth returned to England from exile and later held the professorship twice more (1554–56 and 1559–60), presiding as Vice-Chancellor at the trial of Thomas Cranmer and preaching at the execution of the other two Oxford Martyrs, Hugh Latimer and Nicholas Ridley.
Thomas Caius	1535–52	All Souls College	All Souls College	Caius (whose original surname was "Kay" or "Key") was made a Fellow of All Souls in 1525 and was the university's supervisor of ale in the late 1520s, among other positions. He was elected Registrar in 1532, but removed from office in 1552 for negligence: it was said that he had failed to record the required matters for a year "to the great disworship of the university", and had "procured means and ways to vex and trouble the university", such that he ought to be expelled rather than take "any further profit or commodity". He refused to answer the charges against him. The result of the vote led to him quitting the room in a temper and punching the man sent by the vice-chancellor to restrain him. Caius was imprisoned but was released the following day after agreeing to apologise to the university and to pay a fine of fourpence. He was appointed Master of University College in 1561. His writings included claims refuting Cambridge's assertion that it was an older university than Oxford, alleging in reply that Oxford had been founded by Alfred the Great.
William Standish	1552–79	Magdalen College	— (Note: Standish is not recorded as holding a college appointment or fellowship after 1552.)	Standish, a Fellow of Magdalen from 1538 to 1552, was also auditor of the University from 1550 to 1563.
Richard Cullen	1579–89	Magdalen College	Magdalen College	Cullen was a Fellow of Magdalen from 1571 to 1589.
James Hussey	1589–1600	New College	New College and Magdalen Hall	Hussey, a Fellow from 1589, was principal of Magdalen Hall from 1602 to 1605. He became an advocate at Doctors' Commons in 1604 and was later appointed as Master in Chancery and chancellor to the Bishop of Salisbury. Knighted in 1619, he died of the plague in Oxford in 1625.
Maurice Meyricke	1600–08	New College	New College	Meyricke (sometimes recorded as "Merick" or "Mericke") was appointed a Fellow of New College in 1589. He was later appointed a Fellow of Jesus College by the charter issued in 1622 by James I.
Thomas French	1608–29	St Edmund Hall and Magdalen College	Merton College	French matriculated at St Edmund Hall in 1580 (aged 15) before moving to Magdalen College, then became a Fellow of Merton in 1584. He died in 1629 and was succeeded by his son, John.
John French	1629–51	St Edmund Hall and Magdalen College	Merton College	French was a Fellow of Merton from 1615 and became Registrar in 1629 after the death of his father, the previous holder of the post. He died in 1651 and was buried in Merton College Chapel.
William Whittingham	1651–59	Magdalen Hall and Oriel College	— (Note: Whittingham is not recorded as holding a college appointment fellowship.)	The son of a Timothy Whittingham from Holmside, County Durham, he obtained a licence, in 1640, to marry a widow called Anne Thynn in Harefield, Middlesex. His will was proved at Oxford in January 1660.
Benjamin Cooper	1659–1701	Merton College	— (Note: Benjamin Cooper is not recorded as holding a college appointment or fellowship.)	The son of a William Cooper from Halam, Nottinghamshire, he was Registrar for over 40 years before his death in 1701; his will was proved in Oxford in February of that year. He was succeeded by his son George.
George Cooper	1701–37	Merton College	— (Note: George Cooper is not recorded as holding a college appointment or fellowship.)	Succeeding his father Benjamin, who held the position for over 40 years, George held the position until his death in 1737, his will being proved in Oxford in July of that year.
Henry Fisher	1737–61	Jesus College	— (Note: Fisher is not recorded as holding a college appointment or fellowship.)	Fisher, the son of a Henry Fisher from Wrexham, north Wales, held the post from 1737 until his death on 18 March 1761.
Samuel Forster	1761–97	Wadham College	Wadham College	Forster became a Fellow of Wadham in 1761 and was awarded the degree of Doctor of Civil Law in 1765. He was one of four brothers to study at Oxford (one was a Fellow of Balliol College); one of his sons went to Wadham, and another to Worcester College.
John Gutch	1797–1824	All Souls College	All Souls College	Gutch was chaplain of All Souls from 1770 until his death in 1831; he also served as college librarian, registrar of the chancellor's court and clerk of the Oxford market. On his retirement as Registrar in 1824, he was awarded an annuity of £200 by the university. His main act of scholarship was his edition of Anthony Wood's own English-language version of his history of the university (originally written in Latin, but revised later by Wood in translation). Other publications included two volumes of miscellaneous historical material about the university.
Philip Bliss	1824–53	St John's College	St John's College and St Mary Hall	Bliss, an antiquarian and book collector, was appointed a Fellow of St John's in 1809 and was also junior sub-librarian at the Bodleian Library from 1822 to 1828. He was Keeper of the Archives from 1826 onwards: one writer has stated that "his penchant for accumulation seems to have impeded administrative efficiency", although adding that "his prominence and diligence in university business and his polished manners made him the embodiment of the traditions of ancien régime Oxford." He was principal of St Mary Hall from 1848 until his death in the principal's lodgings in 1857. He retired as Registrar in April 1853 with a pension of £200, in advance of the Oxford University Act 1854.
Edward Rowden	1853–70	New College	— (Note: Rowden is not recorded as holding a college appointment or fellowship after 1851.)	Rowden, a Fellow of New College from 1833 to 1851, was also sub-Warden of the college in 1849. He held the position of Registrar until his death in 1870.
Edward Turner	1870–97	Brasenose College and Trinity College	Brasenose College	Turner became a Fellow of Brasenose in 1845, and was vice-principal of the college from 1870 to 1881. He was appointed Hebrew lecturer and Hulme lecturer on divinity in 1866. He was elected Registrar in 1870, defeating four other candidates for the position, and resigned in 1897.
Thomas Grose	1897–1906	Balliol College	Queen's College	Grose, a clergyman who was a Fellow of Queen's from 1870, was elected in preference to Andrew Clark of Lincoln College on 17 June 1897. He died in February 1906.
Charles Leudesdorf	1906–24	Worcester College	Pembroke College	Leudesdorf, a Fellow of Pembroke College from 1873, was a mathematician, teaching the subject at Pembroke until his appointment as Registrar. From 1889 to 1906, he was Secretary to the university's Boards of Faculties. He was Registrar until his death in 1924, and was regarded as an "efficient and exact" administrator, "absolutely unswerving in devotion to duty".
Edwin Craig	1924–30	University College	Magdalen College	Craig was demonstrator in the Electrical Laboratory at Oxford from 1905 to 1913, also serving as assistant registrar and secretary to the boards of faculties from 1907 until 1924, when he succeeded Leudesdorf. A Fellow of Magdalen from 1918 until his death in 1930, he was the college's vice-president between 1926 and 1928; he also chaired the council of Somerville College from 1924 to 1926. Lewis Richard Farnell (vice-chancellor 1920–1923) described him as "the best university official that I ever worked with, wise, tactful and devoted."
Sir Douglas Veale	1930–58	Corpus Christi College	Corpus Christi College	After serving as an infantry officer in the First World War, Veale worked in the Ministry of Health and was private secretary to various ministers of health from 1921 to 1928. After the Asquith Commission had recommended in 1922 that the post of Registrar should be more important and the university's administration should be improved, Veale's appointment in 1930 was regarded with suspicion by some within Oxford who were adverse to centralized influences and who saw him as a "young man in a hurry". He worked hard to overcome tensions between colleges and the university (and was appointed a Fellow of Corpus Christi in 1930), and also between the university and the city of Oxford.
Sir Folliott Sandford	1958–72	New College	New College	Sandford joined the Air Ministry as a civil servant in 1930, working as Principal Private Secretary to four Secretaries of State for Air between 1937 and 1940 and serving as Deputy Under-Secretary of State from 1947 to 1958. He became a Fellow of New College on his appointment as Registrar, and held both positions until retiring in 1972. Harrison describes him as "unobtrusively providing expertise and continuity" and a hard worker, but one who "lacked Veale's vision and sense of proportion" and who suffered from having to try to match the standards set for the role by Veale.
Geoffrey Caston	1972–79	Peterhouse, Cambridge and Harvard University	Merton College	Caston (the first Registrar not to be educated at the university) was another former civil servant, having worked in the Colonial Office, the Department of Education and Science and the University Grants Committee. After Oxford, he served as Secretary-General to the Committee of Vice-Chancellors and Principals from 1979 to 1983, then as Vice-Chancellor of the University of the South Pacific from 1983 to 1992.
Alan Dorey	1979–98	Pembroke College	Linacre College	Dorey was previously Assistant Registrar, Deputy Registrar (General) and Secretary of the University Chest before succeeding Caston in 1979. On his retirement, he was awarded an honorary doctorate by Oxford in July 1998, in recognition of the "wise advice" that he had provided through the "rough weather" of the 18 years for which he had been Registrar. The Senior Proctor at the time of Dorey's retirement said that "his studied self-effacement has made him too little-known" outside the university offices. He is an Honorary Fellow of Pembroke, his old college.
David Holmes	1998–2006	Merton College	St John's College	Holmes worked as an administrative assistant at the University of Warwick before becoming Assistant Registrar then Senior Assistant Registrar. After serving as Academic Secretary (and for a time also a Deputy Registrar) at the University of Liverpool, he was Registrar and Secretary of the University of Birmingham from 1988 to 1998. He was awarded an honorary doctorate by Oxford for his "outstanding service", overseeing the construction of various university buildings such as the Saïd Business School and tackling various financial matters that concerned Oxford.
Julie Maxton	2006–10	University College, London	University College	Maxton, the first female Registrar in Oxford's history, was previously Dean of Law at the University of Auckland, where she worked with John Hood (Auckland's Vice-Chancellor 1998–2004 and Oxford's Vice-Chancellor 2004–09). She moved to New Zealand in 1982, having qualified as a barrister in London, and was a commercial lawyer there, regarded by the judge Lord Cooke of Thorndon as "one of the brightest stars in the New Zealand legal firmament." She left to become Executive Director of the Royal Society.
Ewan McKendrick	2011–18	University of Edinburgh and Pembroke College	Lady Margaret Hall (Note: McKendrick has been a Fellow of Lady Margaret Hall since 2000.)	McKendrick taught law at Lancashire Polytechnic, the University of Essex and the London School of Economics before his first teaching position at Oxford. After five years as Professor of English Law at University College London, he was appointed Herbert Smith Professor of English Private Law at Oxford in 2000. He was appointed a pro-vice-chancellor in 2006.
Gill Aitken	From September 2018	St Hugh's College		Aitken graduated in 1982 with a degree in philosophy and theology, qualifying later as a lawyer. She joined the Civil Service in 1993 and worked for DWP, DEFRA, and the Department of Health in a variety of legal and corporate roles. From 2014 until her appointment at Oxford, she was the director general and general counsel at HM Revenue and Customs.

== See also ==
- Registrary, the equivalent position at the University of Cambridge
