= University of Auckland Law School =

Law school of the University of Auckland, New Zealand

Coordinates: 36.848287°S 174.771781°E

Auckland Law School
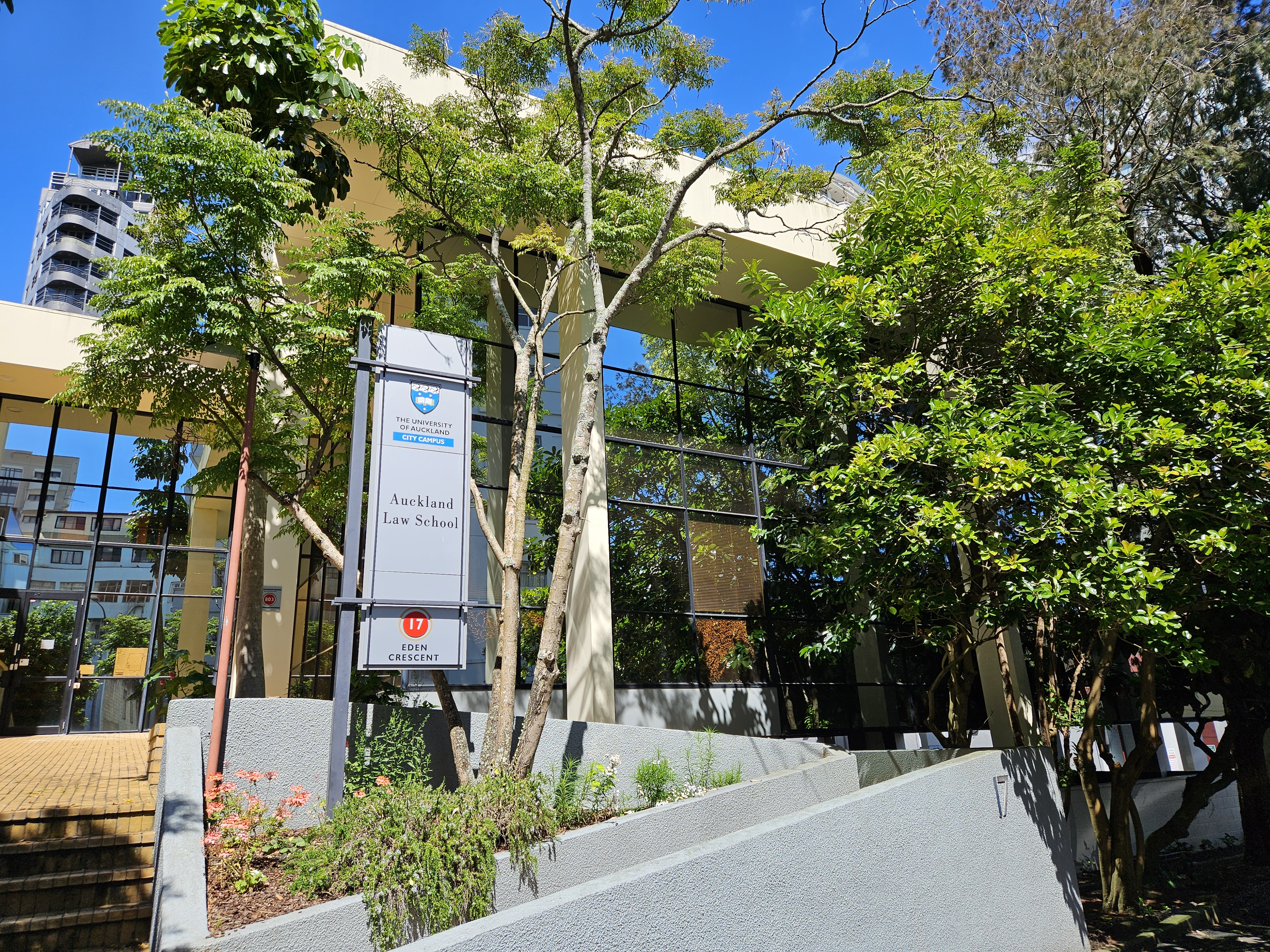
- Type: Public Law School
- Established: 1883
- Parent institution: University of Auckland
- Accreditation: New Zealand Law Society
- Acting dean: Warren Swain
- Location: Auckland, New Zealand
- Website: law.auckland.ac.nz

Auckland Law School is one of the six faculties that make up the University of Auckland. Auckland Law School is located at the City Campus, between Waterloo Quadrant and Eden Crescent. It is in close proximity to the Auckland High Court. As of 2025, Auckland Law School ranked equal 59th in the world. It has courses in a variety of fields, including commercial, public, human rights and environmental law.

== History of the land ==
The land (and some of the buildings) that Auckland Law School now occupies were previously used by the High Court of New Zealand in Auckland. One courtroom has been retained unaltered for moots. Prior to this, the land was part of the Albert Barracks.

Until 1991, the law school was based on the top three floors of the University Library building.

== Davis Law Library ==
The Davis Law Library is named after Professor A. G. Davis, who retired as Dean of Auckland Law School in 1965. The Library was founded at the university in 1939 and has had several locations, including a move into the General Library building in 1969. It has been in its current Eden Crescent location since 1992.

== Student activities ==
Auckland Law School is the home of volunteer (pro-bono legal services) organisation, the Equal Justice Project. Founded in 2005 by students Eesvan Kirshnan and Peter Williams with the aim of promoting equal access to justice in Auckland. It is one of the largest pro bono organisations in New Zealand.

The University of Auckland Mooting Society was formed in 2014 and is the first society of its kind in New Zealand. Throughout the year the Society offers a variety of seminars and workshops to assist students with compulsory academic moots. The John Haigh Memorial Moot was established in 2014 in memory of John Haigh QC (LLB '71), a highly respected barrister and alumnus of Auckland Law School. The 2014 final was judged by Harrison, Toogood and Moore JJ in the Auckland High Court. The moot provides an opportunity for third-year and above students to develop and enhance their advocacy skills. In 2020, the University of Auckland Mooting Society is one of the largest clubs at Auckland Law School. They run five moots aimed at facilitating and developing mooting and advocacy.

An elected student body, the Auckland University Law Students' Society, represents and advocates for law students and helps to provide opportunities which complement legal studies. AULSS help organize social events such as "Steins", publication of the serious academic Law Review, an annual Law Revue, mooting competitions, and participation in sports and events such as the Round the Bays fun run. Law students traditionally dominate both competition and administration of both the Auckland University Debating Association and the Auckland Debating Association.

Te Rākau Ture (TRT) is the name of the Māori Law Students Association in which the rōpū initiates activities throughout the calendar year. Established in 1990, TRT has grown to play a very important role in the lives of Māori students who study at Auckland Law School. Each year the rōpū organise a number of events such as hosting a noho marae for Part II and above, a Haerenga visiting high schools outside of Auckland to promote coming to the Law School, plus their most popular hākari whakamutunga. They welcome everyone to join TRT and encourage members to participate in their events to meet other students and build support networks.

The Pacific Island Law Student's Association (PILSA) aims to provide a sense of identity and belonging among Pacific Island students at Auckland Law School. It also aims to promote educational achievement and to connect with Pacific communities outside of the university through various events organised throughout the year. The elected PILSA executive committee is a link between the PILSA members, the Pacific Students Faculty Adviser, Auckland Law School and Pacific Island communities. The PILSA executive works closely with the Student Academic and Support Adviser (Pacific) to provide workshops, seminars and tutorials for PILSA members. PILSA encourages all students to join PILSA and participate in social events, sports-days, tutorials, seminars and the Pacific Islands Moot.

As of 2017, Auckland has been the national senior mooting champion for nine of the past ten years. It has therefore represented New Zealand at the most prestigious moot court competition in the world, the Philip C. Jessup International Law Moot, nine times in the past ten years. Highlights of Auckland's participation in the Jessup include a semi-final finish in 2012, and a Best Oralist award at the international rounds (Andrew Grant) in 2017.

== Research ==
Auckland Law School is home to a number of research centres, including The Aotearoa New Zealand Centre for Indigenous Peoples and the Law, the New Zealand Centre for Environmental Law, the New Zealand Centre for ICT Law, the NZ Centre for Legal and Political Theory, The New Zealand Centre for Human Rights Law, Policy and Practice and the Research Centre for Business Law. It is also home to Te Tai Haruru – the Māori Legal Academics Group.

== Postgraduate studies ==
Auckland Law School offers opportunities for postgraduate legal research.

The Master of Laws (LLM) is designed to provide an advanced level of study for both full-time students and those who are legal practitioners or engaged in other full- or part-time employment. Students may concentrate their study in particular areas of specialisation, or study a broad range of legal subjects. The LLM programme offers six specialisations: Commercial and Corporate Law, Public Law, Environmental Law, Human Rights Law, International Law, and Litigation and Dispute Resolution.

The LLM undertaken by research offers graduates the opportunity to conduct in-depth research in an area of personal interest to enhance future employment opportunities either professionally or academically.

The LLM undertaken by coursework offers law graduates an opportunity to study areas in greater depth and complexity than within an undergraduate law degree, combining courses of sophistication and technical difficulty in terms of legal content with courses that contain relevant interdisciplinary subject matter and a focus on policy. Each course contains a significant research component, usually in the form of a 12,500 word research essay. The LLM also permits cross-disciplinary study in the form of one Masters course (30 points) from another faculty in the University of Auckland.

The Masters of Legal Studies (MLS) is for graduates who do not have a Law undergraduate degree but have a four-year degree or equivalent in another discipline and whose work involves legal issues and dealing with legislation. Completion of this degree will not satisfy the entry requirements for admission as a barrister and solicitor in New Zealand and is not a substitute for an LLB degree. The MLS suits professionals from non-legal backgrounds who find that their careers require some knowledge of legal matters, but do not necessarily want to practise law. Professionals who will particularly benefit include: Accountants and Auditors, Architects and Town Planners, Business Development Managers, Compliance Managers, Teachers, Engineers, IT professionals, Police and Public Sector Professionals.

A Doctor of Philosophy (PhD) in Law is a thesis-only research degree usually requiring full-time study for three to four years at the University of Auckland. The degree is undertaken under supervision and candidates must complete a sustained course of advanced legal research resulting in the production of a substantial original thesis. The degree is governed by the general University PhD regulations.

== Deans ==
Appointed	Dean	Speciality
2024	(acting) Professor Warren Swain, MA BCL DPhil Oxf.; FRHistS	Contract law
2019	Professor Penelope Mathew, BA(Hons) LLB Melb., LLM JSD Col.	Refugee law and human rights
2011	Professor Andrew Stockley, BA LLB Well., BA(Hons) Cant. PhD Camb., MA DPhil Oxf.	Constitutional law and history
2006	Professor Paul T Rishworth, LLB(Hons), MJur Auck.	Public law, human rights, constitutional law
2002	Professor Dame Julie K Maxton, LLB(Hons) Lond., LLM Cant., PhD Auck. DBE	Equity and trusts
2001	vacant	
1996	Professor Bruce V Harris, LLB(Hons) Otago, LLM Harv., LLD Otago.	Constitutional law
1993	Professor M B (Mike) Taggart, LLM Harv., LLB Auck.	Administrative law
1991	Professor Sir R G (Grant) Hammond, LLM Ill., LLB MJur Auck. LLD Waikato, KNZM	Commercial law
1987	Professor F M (Jock) Brookfield, BA LLB NZ, DPhil Oxf.	Public law, Treaty of Waitangi
1985	Professor Brian Coote, LLM NZ, PhD Camb., LLD Auck., CBE, FRSNZ	Contract law
1984	vacant	
1965	Professor J F (Jack) Northey, BA LLM NZ., DJur Tor., LLD Auck.	Public law
1942	Professor A G (Arthur Geoffrey) Davis, LLD Lond., LLB NZ.	Contract law
1939	Professor Julius Stone, BA, DCL Oxf., LLM Leeds, JSD Harv., AO, OBE, QC	Jurisprudence & international law
1938	Sir Leslie Knox Munro, LLM NZ., KCMG, KCVO	
1920	Professor Sir Ronald Algie, LLM NZ.	
