= Geoffrey Caston =

British academic administrator (1926–2018)

Geoffrey Kemp Caston CBE (17 May 1926 – 19 January 2018) was Registrar of the University of Oxford (1972 to 1979) and Vice-Chancellor of the University of the South Pacific (1983 to 1992).

== Life and career ==
Geoffrey Kemp Caston was born on 17 May 1926 and was educated at St Dunstan's College, London. He then studied at Peterhouse, Cambridge (history and law) and Harvard University (Master of Public Administration).

He worked as a civil servant, joining the Colonial Office in 1951, serving at the UK Mission to the United Nations in New York from 1958 to 1961, then returning to Britain and the Department of Education and Science followed by the University Grants Committee.

He was appointed Registrar of the University of Oxford in 1972, and was also made a Fellow of Merton College, Oxford. He left Oxford in 1979, serving as Secretary-General to the Committee of Vice-Chancellors and Principals until 1983, then holding the position of Vice-Chancellor of the University of the South Pacific from 1983 to 1992.

He was appointed a Commander of the Order of the British Empire (CBE) in 1990.

He died on 19 January 2018 at the age of 91.
