= BTI 2014 LLC v Sequana SA =

2022 UK company law case

- Court: UK Supreme Court
- Citation: [2022] UKSC 25

Keywords
- Creditor duties

BTI 2014 LLC v Sequana SA [2022] UKSC 25 is a UK company law case, concerning the duties of directors towards creditors as a company approaches insolvency.

== Facts ==
The assignee of a creditor claim against a company called AWA sued its directors for paying a €135 million dividend, 10 years before the company went insolvent, when they knew there was large potential liability for pollution. The directors of AWA called a dividend of €135 million to be distributed in May 2009 to the sole shareholder, Sequana SA, which paid off the debt that Sequana had owed to AWA. This complied with limits on dividends in the Companies Act 2006 part 23, and common law rules on capital maintenance. AWA had been solvent, but had also potential liability for pollution damages, and an uncertain insurance portfolio. AWA went into insolvency 10 years later in October 2018, and BTI 2014 LLC was assigned AWA's creditor claims. BTI sought to recover the €135 million dividend from the AWA directors, arguing the directors' decision to distribute the dividend was a breach of creditor duties.

The High Court and Court of Appeal rejected that there were further duties to creditors under the standard in West Mercia Safetywear v Dodd, holding it did not arise until the company was insolvent, or at least headed for insolvency. BTI appealed.

== Judgment ==
The Supreme Court held the directors were not under a duty to consider creditors when they paid the dividend, or act in their interests at the time.

Lord Briggs (Lord Kitchin and Lord Hodge agreeing) gave the leading judgment. There was both a statutory and common law duty to act in the interests of creditors, as is recognised across the common law world. In principle, the duty could apply to the decision to pay an otherwise lawful dividend payment. The greater the company's financial difficulties, the more they must consider creditors, and whenever a company is insolvent (but not facing inevitable administration or liquidation) it must balance creditor and shareholder interests if they conflict. There is no duty to consider particular creditors, rather than the whole body. When administration or liquidation is inevitable, or the wrongful trading duties in the Insolvency Act 1986 section 214 become engaged, creditors' interests become paramount, as shareholders cease to retain any valuable interest in the company. However, the duty was not engaged on the facts because AWA's insolvency was not even probable at the time of the dividend payment. The duty arises when the directors know or ought to know the company is insolvent or bordering on insolvency, or that insolvency is probable.

Lord Reed and Lady Arden gave concurring judgments with different reasoning. Lady Arden held that the content of the rule in West Mercia is not limited to consideration of creditors’ interests; the directors are also required not to harm those interests [288].

== See also ==
- UK company law
