= Ewan McKendrick =

Professor of English Private Law at the University of Oxford

Ewan McKendrick KC (Hon)
- Born: Ewan Gordon McKendrick; 1960 (age 65–66)

Academic background
- Education: University of Edinburgh; Pembroke College, Oxford (BCL)

Academic work
- Sub-discipline: English private law
- Institutions: University College London; University of Oxford
- Website: ox.ac.uk

Ewan Gordon McKendrick (born 1960) is Professor of English Private Law at the University of Oxford. He is known for his academic work on the law of contract, as well as publications in the law of unjust enrichment and commercial law.

== Life ==
McKendrick was educated at the University of Edinburgh, where he studied law, and Pembroke College, Oxford, where he obtained a Bachelor of Civil Law degree (BCL).

After lecturing at the Central Lancashire Polytechnic, University of Essex and London School of Economics, he returned to Oxford in 1991 as a Fellow of St Anne's College. In 1995, he became Professor of English Law at University College London.

He was called to the bar as a member of Gray's Inn in 1998 and was appointed a Bencher in 2009.

He left UCL in 2000 to become Herbert Smith Professor of English Private Law at Oxford University, a post that is associated with a fellowship at Lady Margaret Hall.

He became a Pro-Vice-Chancellor of the university in 2006.

He became Registrar of the University of Oxford on 1 January 2011.

In 2015, he was appointed an honorary Queen's Counsel.

== Publications ==
Articles

- McKendrick E, ‘Commercial Contract Law: How Important is the Quest for Certainty?’ (2021) 2021(Feb) Lloyd’s Maritime and Commercial Law Quarterly 72
- McKendrick E, M Luycks J and M M Hendrikx A, ‘A NCC Case on Contract Interpretation from an English and Dutch Law Perspective’ (2021) 29(1) European Review of Private Law 71
- McKendrick E, ‘Liquidated Damages, Delay and the Termination of Contracts’ [2019] (8) Journal of Business Law 577
- McKendrick E, ‘Doctrine and Discretion in the Law of Contract Revisited’ (2019) 7(1) Chinese Journal of Comparative Law 1
- McKendrick E and Maxwell I, ‘Specific Performance in International Arbitration’ (2013) 1(2) Chinese Journal of Comparative Law 195
- McKendrick E, ‘Interpretation of Contracts and the Admissibility of Pre-Contractual Negotiations’ (2005) 17 Singapore Academy of Law Journal 248
- McKendrick E, ‘The Common Law at Work: The Saga of Alfred McAlpine Construction Ltd v Panatown Ltd’ (2003) 3(1) Oxford University Commonwealth Law Journal 145
- McKendrick E, ‘Traditional Concepts and Contemporary Values’ [2002] European Review of Private Law 95
- McKendrick E, ‘Contracts, The Common Law and the Impact of Europe’ [2001] Europa E Diritto Privato 769
- McKendrick E and Parker M, ‘Drafting Force Majeure Clauses: Some Practical Considerations’ (2000) 11(4) International Company and Commercial Law Review 132
- McKendrick E, ‘Breach of Contract and the Meaning of Loss’ [1999] Current Legal Problems 37
- McKendrick E, ‘Promises to Perform - How Valuable?’ (1992) 5 Journal of Contract Law 6
- McKendrick E, ‘Pirelli Re-examined’ (1991) 11 Legal Studies 326
- McKendrick E, ‘Vicarious Liability and Independent Contractors - A Re-examination’ (1990) 53(6) Modern Law Review 770
- McKendrick E, ‘The Rights of Trade Union Members - Part I of the Employment Act 1988’ (1988) 17(2) Industrial Law Journal 141
- McKendrick E, ‘The Battle of the Forms and the Law of Restitution’ (1988) 8(Summer) Oxford Journal of Legal Studies 197
- McKendrick E, ‘Specific Implement and Specific Performance - A Comparison’ [1986] Scots Law Times 249
- McKendrick E, ‘Trade Unions and Non-Striking Members’ (1986) 6(1) Legal Studies 35
- Wedderburn of Charlton L, McKendrick E and Real A, ‘Il Diritto del Lavoro in Gran Bretagna 1980-1983’ (1985) 28 Giornale Di Diritto Del Lavoro E Di Relazioni Industriali 833
- McKendrick E, ‘Economic Duress A Reply’ [1985] Scots Law Times 277

Books

- Goode on Commercial Law (Penguin 2010)
- Contract Law (14th edn Macmillan 2021)
- Interests in Goods (with Norman Palmer) (Lloyd's of London Press 1998)
- Product Liability in the Construction Industry (with Norman Palmer) (Lloyd's of London Press 1993)
- Force Majeure and Frustration of Contract (Routledge 1995)

== See also ==
- English contract law
