= Oxford Journal of Legal Studies =

- Discipline: Law
- Language: English

Publication details
- History: 1981–present
- Publisher: Oxford University Press (United Kingdom)
- Frequency: Quarterly
- Impact factor: 1.083 (2018)

Standard abbreviations
- ISO 4: Oxf. J. Leg. Stud.

Indexing
- ISSN: 0143-6503 (print); 1464-3820 (web)
- LCCN: 83645842
- JSTOR: 01436503
- OCLC no.: 7636038

Links
- Journal homepage; Online access; Online archive

The Oxford Journal of Legal Studies is a legal journal published by Oxford University Press on behalf of the Faculty of Law, University of Oxford.

According to the Journal Citation Reports, the journal has a 2018 impact factor of 1.083, ranking it 75th out of 148 journals in the category "Law". With a combined score of 4.3, the journal is ranked 3rd out of 85 in the category of refereed "General" Law journals by the W&L Law Journal Rankings.

== See also ==
- English law
- Law of the United Kingdom
- List of law journals
