= Faculty of Law, University of Oxford =

Law school of the University of Oxford

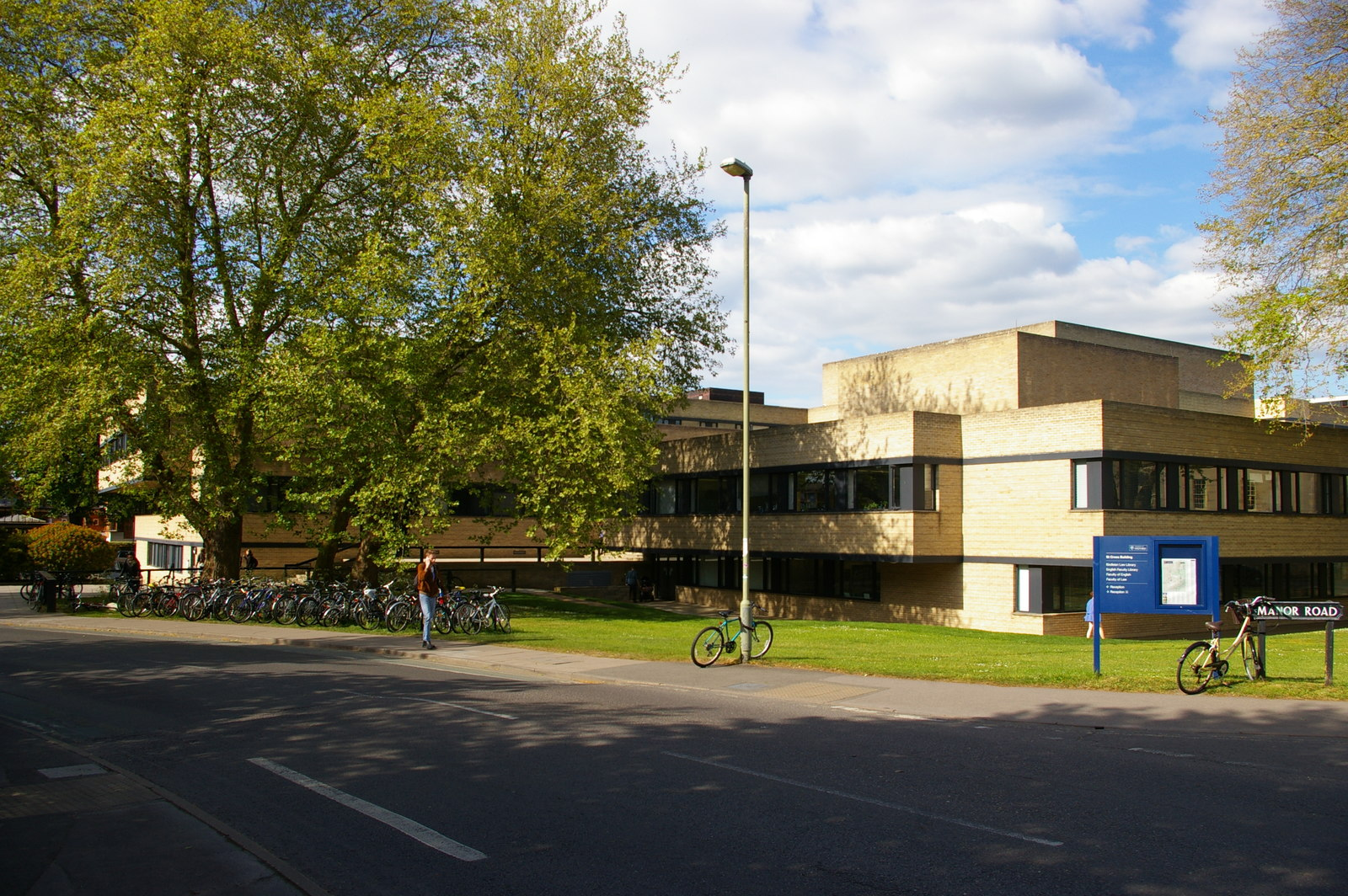
Law Faculty, St Cross Building

The Faculty of Law is the law school at the Social Sciences Division at the University of Oxford in Oxford, England, United Kingdom. The school has a history of over 800 years in the teaching and learning of law.

Along with its counterpart at Cambridge, it is unique in its use of personalised tutorials, in which students are taught by faculty fellows in groups of one to three on a weekly basis, as the main form of instruction in its undergraduate and graduate courses. It offers the largest doctoral programme in Law in the English-speaking world.

== History ==
There were faculties of Civil Law and Canon Law in the medieval University. During the Reformation, Henry VIII prohibited the teaching of Canon Law, instead founding the Regius Chair of Civil Law, one of the oldest Professorships at the University of Oxford. From then until the 19th century, the university awarded the Bachelor of Civil Law and the Doctor of Civil Law, through the Faculty of Civil Law.

William Blackstone, a graduate of Pembroke College, Oxford and subsequently a Fellow of All Souls College, Oxford, was appointed the inaugural Vinerian Professor of English Law in 1758, and was the first professor at any university to teach the common law. His lectures formed the basis for his Commentaries on the Laws of England, a definitive source of and case for the study of the English common law.

It was not until the 1870s that Oxford offered a degree in English law, the BA in Jurisprudence. Not long after, Cornelia Sorabji was the first woman to read law at Oxford in 1889. In the late 19th and early 20th centuries, there were prominent professors in Oxford such as Frederick Pollock, William Anson, and Albert Dicey. The emergence of a large community of legal scholars in twenty-five men's colleges can be dated from the 1920s and 1930s, but the development was consolidated in the 1950s and 1960s, when Law Fellowships also became common in the women's colleges. The Oxford law school flourished through the operation of the resulting internal market, and through the brilliance of particular leading scholars such as H. L. A. Hart, Rupert Cross, Tony Honoré, John Morris, Peter Carter, and others.

In the twentieth century, the BCL became a master's level degree; and, by the 1970s, Oxford developed a large graduate programme in law. It has been claimed that the BCL at Oxford is "the most highly regarded taught masters-level qualification in the common law world". The DPhil in Law, which dates to the 1910s, became popular at that time particularly in international law, comparative law, and philosophy of law; after the 1970s, the areas of research pursued in the doctoral programme broadened to make it a general training ground for legal academics. In 2010 the MSc in Law and Finance (MLF) was introduced and is taught jointly by the Faculty of Law and the Saïd Business School. The MLF programme involves a combination of finance and economic courses combined with BCL law courses. Like the BCL taught at Oxford, entry into the MLF is highly competitive with on average less than fifteen per cent of applicants being accepted.

== Programmes offered ==
=== Graduate programmes: BCL, MJur and MSc Law and Finance ===
These graduate programmes have an acceptance rate of around 5%.

The MSc in Law and Finance (MLF) is delivered jointly by the Faculty of Law and Saïd Business School. MLF candidates study the law courses alongside BCL students and attend finance courses alongside MSc in Financial Economics students.

== Rankings and reputation ==
Rankings
National rankings
- Complete (2027): 1
- Guardian (2026): 1

Global rankings
- QS (2026): 2
- THE (2026): 7

Oxford's Law Faculty is currently ranked second in the UK and fourth in the world in the 2023 Times Higher Education World University Rankings under the law subject.

Its average acceptance rate was less than 5% in between 2016 and 2019. Oxford's BCL programme has been described as "the most highly regarded taught masters-level qualification in the common law world". A first-class in undergraduate degree in Law or equivalent is a prerequisite (as a guide a student will need to be in the top 5% of his or her graduating class), with the same applying for the MJur and Masters in Law and Finance.

For research programmes, an outstanding record in earlier higher education and the skills and commitment to pursue research to the highest level are required by applicants for postgraduate research programmes. It is very rare for a candidate to be admitted without having completed a degree in Law, except in socio-legal studies and criminology.

== Academics ==
=== Research centres and Institutes ===
The faculty has a number of research centres and institutes.

=== Oxford Pro Bono Publico (OPBP) ===
The Oxford Pro Bono Publico (OPBP) is an organisation consisting of graduate law students and members of faculty to provide comparative law research, gratis, for lawyers acting pro bono around the world as well as promoting pro bono law in general.

== Facilities ==
=== St Cross Building ===
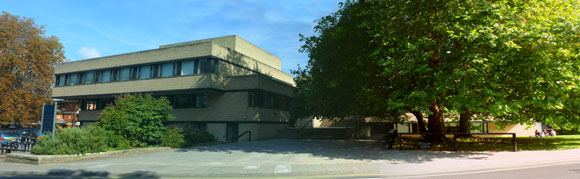
St Cross Building from St Cross Road

The Law Faculty offices, together with the English Faculty, are situated in the St Cross Building, which is a Grade II* listed building completed in 1964 and designed by Sir John Leslie Martin (architect of the Royal Festival Hall in London) and Colin St John Wilson (architect of the New British Library). The St Cross Building is also home to the Bodleian Law Library.

=== Bodleian Law Library ===
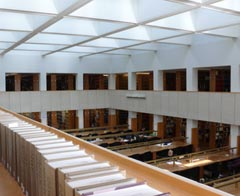
The Bodleian Law Library

The Bodleian Law Library was opened in 1964 and holds over 450,000 volumes. It is a Legal Deposit Library, allowing it to claim a copy of any printed legal material published in the United Kingdom or Ireland. It is also an official Documentation Centre for the European Union.

== Notable people ==
Notable people associated with the Faculty of Law include former UK Prime Minister Tony Blair, twelve Lord Chancellors, nine Lord Chief Justices and twenty-two law lords (such as Lord Hoffmann, Lord Denning); several heads of state around the world, including John Turner, Prime Minister of Canada (1984–1984), Seni Pramoj (1947–1951), Prime Minister of Thailand, and several Prime Ministers of Pakistan, including Liaquat Ali Khan (1947–1951), Huseyn Shaheed Suhrawardy (1956–1957), Zulfikar Ali Bhutto (1945–1946).The former Lord Chief Justice (the most senior judge in England and Wales), Lord Burnett, in office from 2017 to 2023, was educated at Oxford.

=== Notable alumni ===
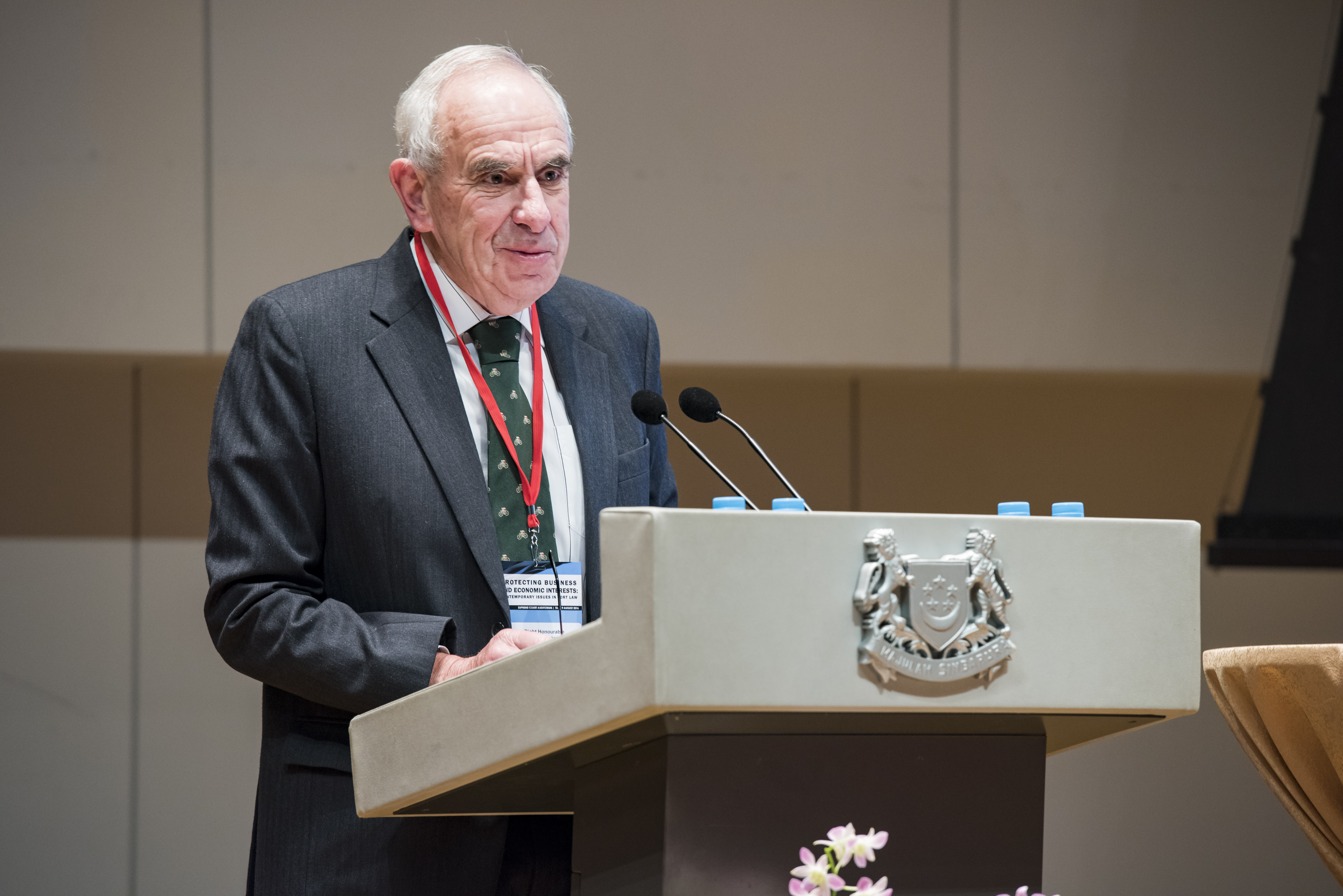
Lord Hoffmann

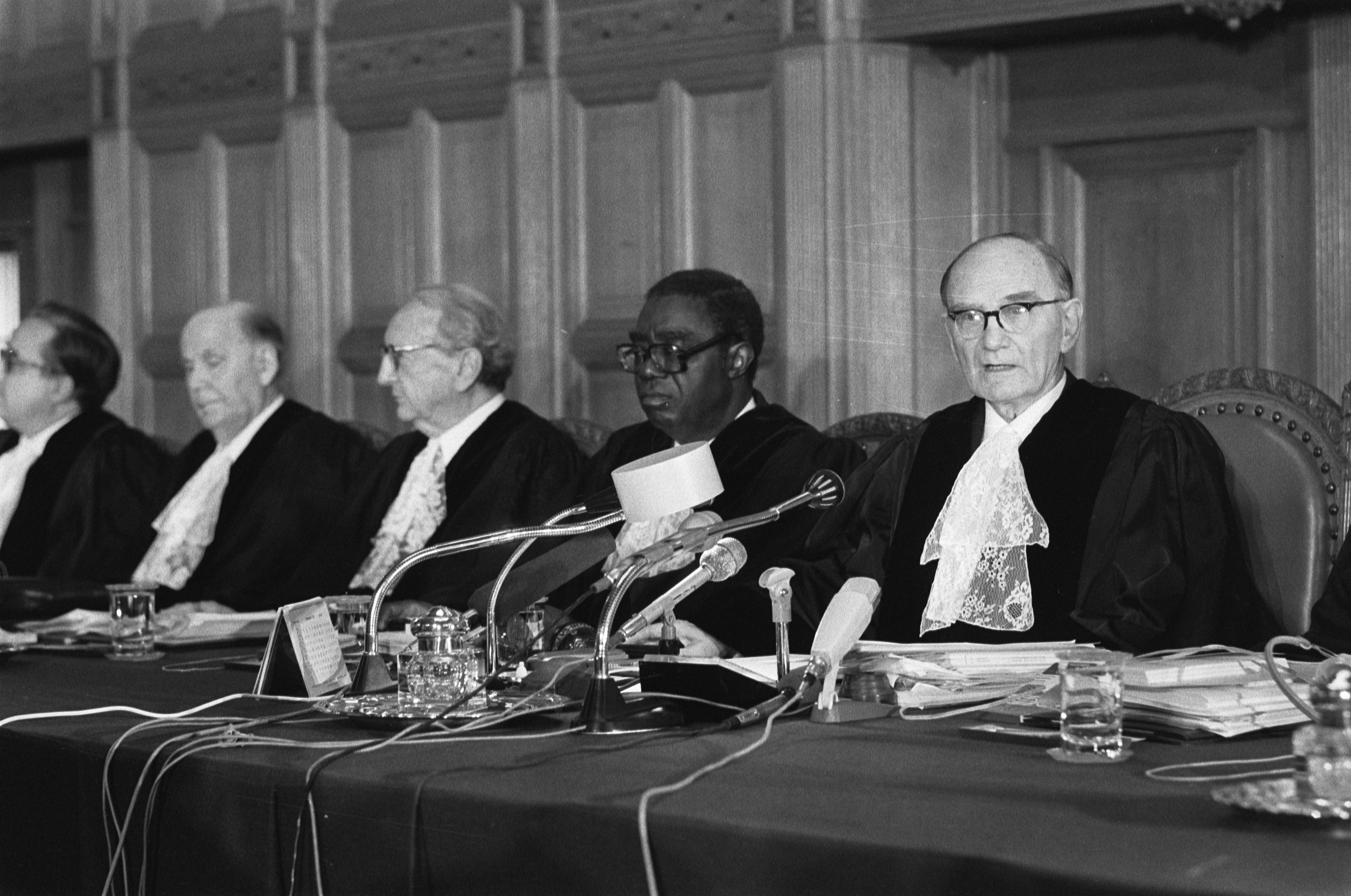
Sir Humphrey Waldock

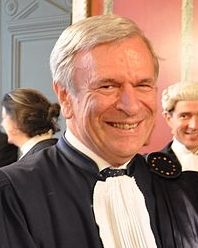
Sir Nicolas Bratza

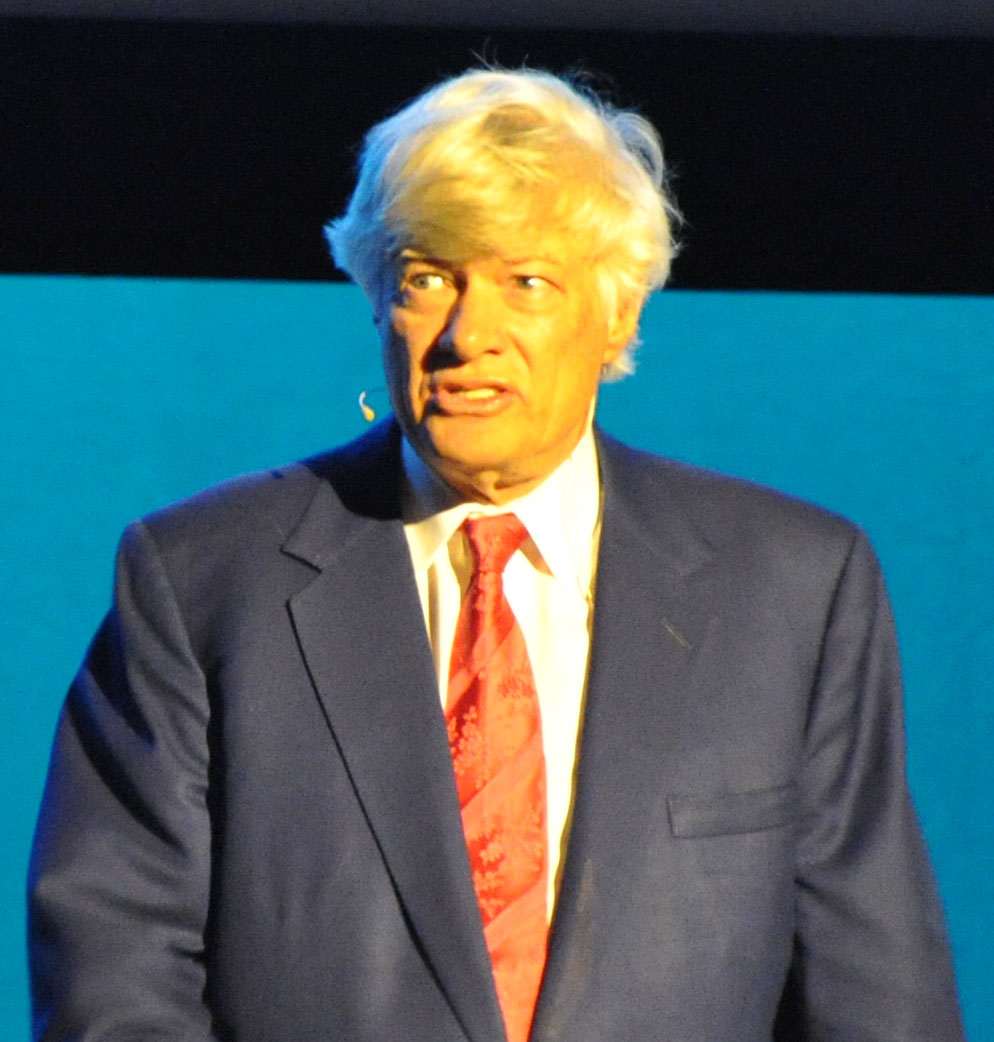
Geoffrey Robertson

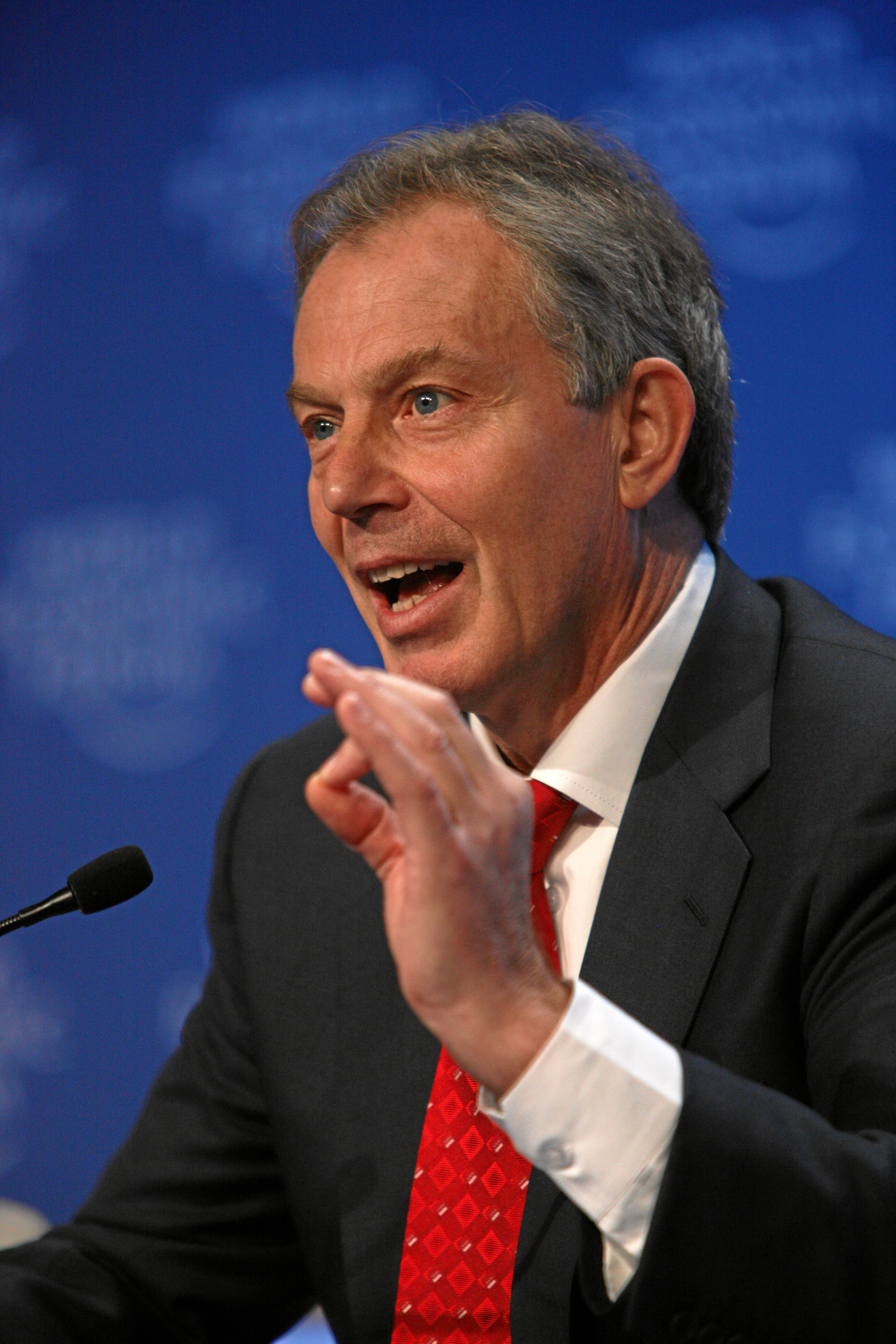
Tony Blair

=== Notable academics ===
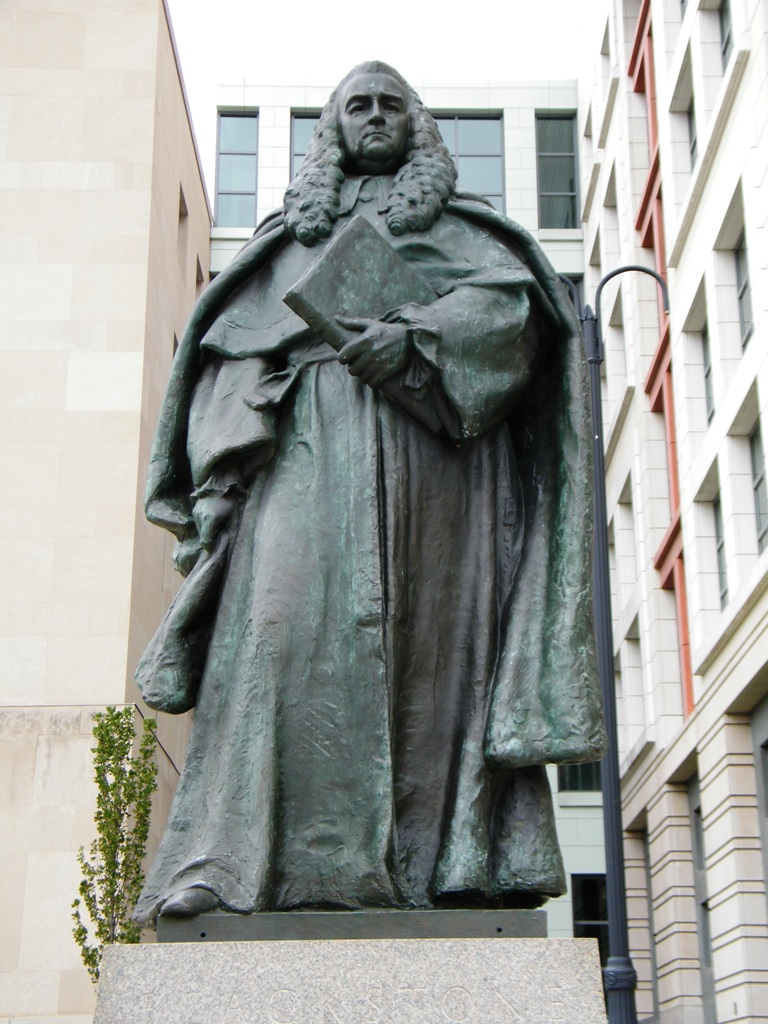
Sir William Blackstone

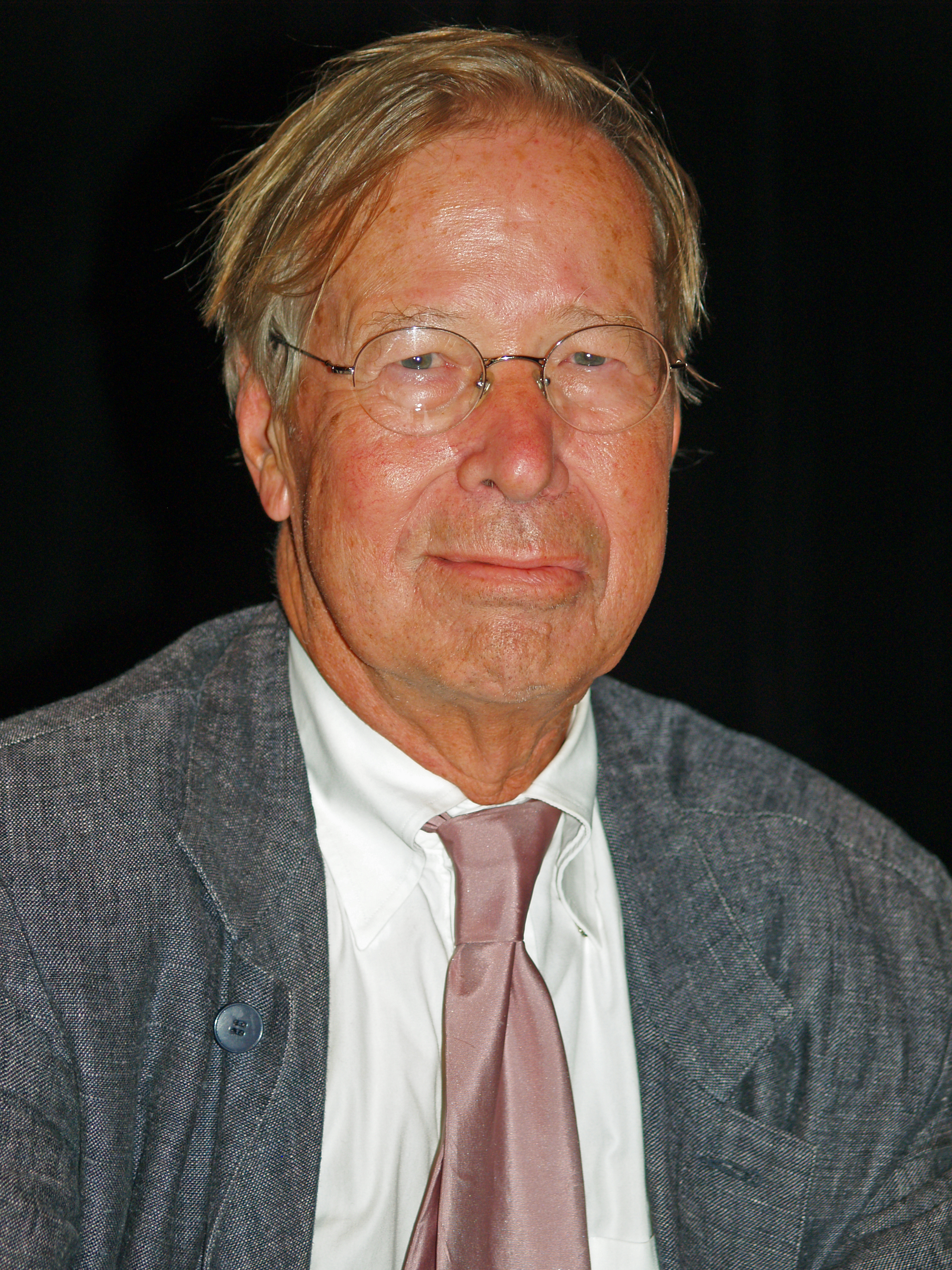
Ronald Dworkin

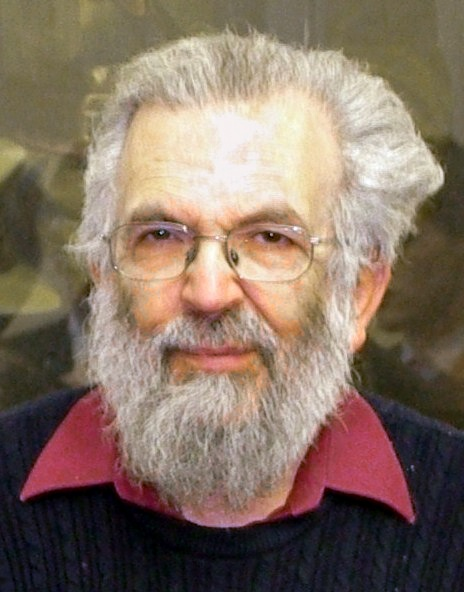
Joseph Raz
- Sir Ian Brownlie
- Vaughan Lowe, QC
- Sir Roy Goode QC

Professorships

- Chichele Professor of Public International Law
- Professor of Jurisprudence
- Vinerian Professor of English Law
- Freshfields Professor of Commercial Law (current holder: Horst Eidenmüller)
