= Professor of Law (1973) (Cambridge) =

Professorship in law at the University of Cambridge

Professorship of Law (1973)
- Incumbent; None (since 30 September 2019)
- Faculty of Law, University of Cambridge
- Style: Professor
- Type: Professorship
- Residence: University of Cambridge
- Appointer: The Board of Electors to the Professorship of Law (1973), chaired by the Vice-chancellor of the University of Cambridge or his Deputy
- Constituting instrument: Chapter XI, Statutes and Ordinances of the University of Cambridge
- Formation: 1973
- Salary: £71,404–£186,919

The Professorship of Law (1973) is a permanently-established professorship in law at the University of Cambridge, founded in 1973. It is not linked to any particular field of law, and its most recent holder was the English legal comparativist, John Bell. Bell now holds the title Emeritus Professor of Law (1973).

Its holders are chosen based on their teaching and research record, their commitment to building a research presence, the ability to further the academic planning and strategic development of law at the university, the ability to work with other teachers and students, and their enthusiasm towards training the next generation of researchers.

== Professors of Law (1973) ==
1. Kurt Lipstein (1973–1976)
2. S. F. C. Milsom (1976–1990)
3. Bill Cornish (1990–1995)
4. Bob Hepple (1995–2001)
5. John Bell (2001–2019)
6. Campbell McLachlan (elected with effect from July 2024)

== Professors of Law (single-tenure establishments) ==
The Professorship of Law (1973) is not to be confused with a number of Professorships of Law for single tenures (i.e. as personal chairs), established by the university for specific individuals. Examples include:

- Sir David Williams (1996)
- John R. Spencer (1995–2013)
- Kevin Gray (1993–2015)
- Simon Deakin (2006–)

== See also ==
- Downing Professor of the Laws of England
- Rouse Ball Professor of English Law
- Regius Professor of Civil Law (Cambridge)
- Whewell Professor of International Law
- Sir David Williams Professor of Public Law
