= Arras Memorial =

World War I memorial in France

- Commonwealth War Graves Commission
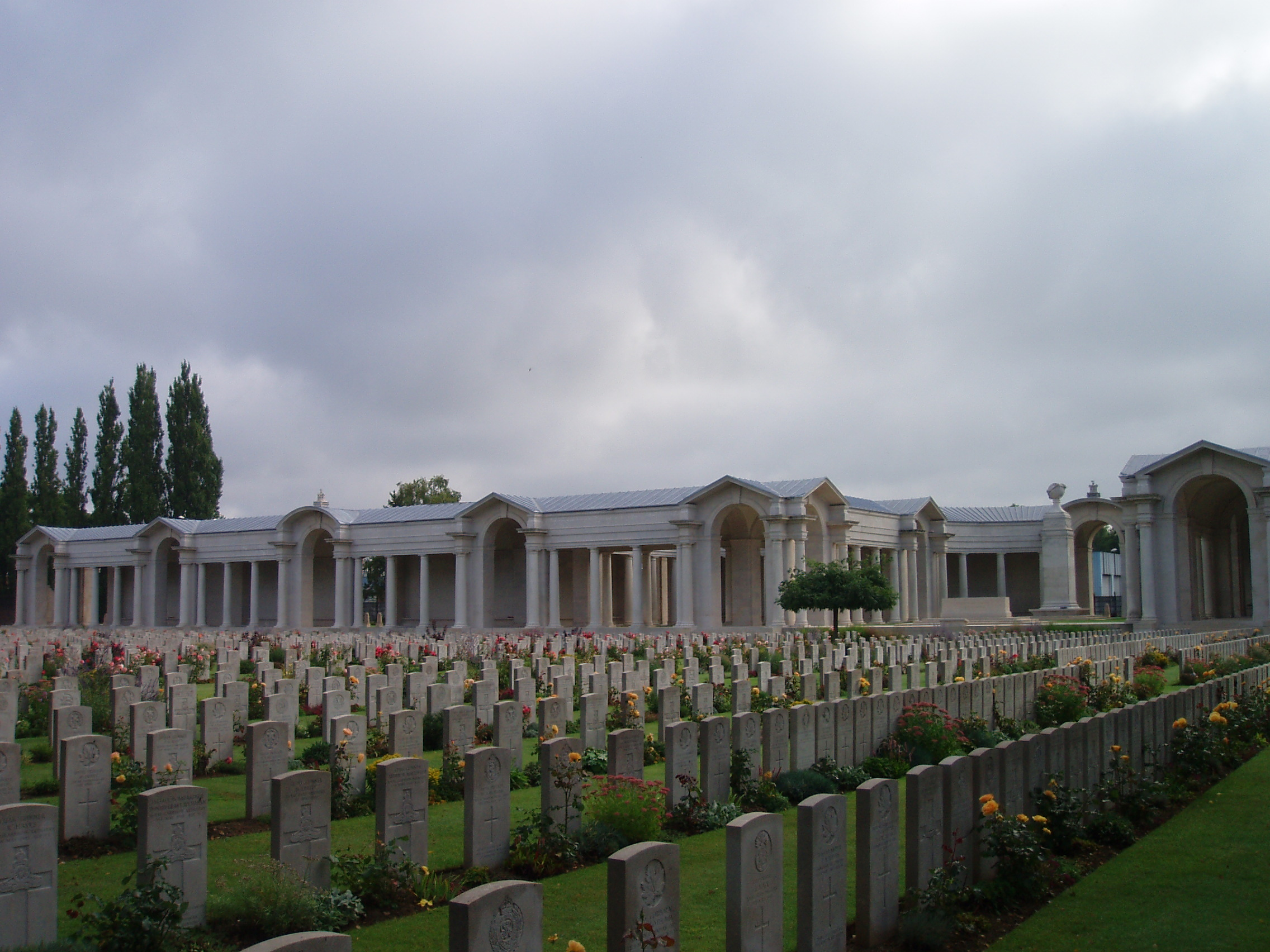
- Arras Memorial forming one side of the Faubourg d'Amiens British Cemetery
- For forces of the United Kingdom, South Africa and New Zealand
- Unveiled: 31 July 1932
- Location: 50°17′14.58″N 02°45′35.32″E
- Designed by: Sir Edwin Lutyens (architect); Sir William Reid Dick (sculptor)
- Here are recorded the names of 35942 officers and men of the forces of the British Empire who fell in the Battles of Arras or in air operations above the Western Front and who have no known grave

UNESCO World Heritage Site
- Official name: Funerary and memory sites of the First World War (Western Front)
- Type: Cultural
- Criteria: i, ii, vi
- Designated: 2023 (45th session)
- Reference no.: 1567-PC11

The Arras Memorial is a World War I memorial in France, located in the Faubourg d'Amiens British Cemetery, in the western part of the town of Arras. The memorial commemorates 35,942 soldiers of the forces of the United Kingdom, South Africa and New Zealand, with no known grave, who died in the Arras sector between the spring of 1916 and 7 August 1918.

The major battle in this area during this period was the Battle of Arras. The cut-off date of 7 August 1918 signifies the start of the Advance to Victory, and casualties after that date are listed on other memorials. Also not included here are the names of the missing dead among Canadian and Australian servicemen, who are instead listed at the Vimy Memorial and the Villers-Bretonneux Memorial.

Designed by Sir Edwin Lutyens, the memorial includes sculpture by Sir William Reid Dick. Located in the same cemetery is the Arras Flying Services Memorial (commemorating 991 airmen with no known grave).

Both memorials were unveiled by Lord Trenchard on 31 July 1932. Lord Trenchard had served as the commander of Royal Flying Corps in France from 1915 to 1917. In 1918, he briefly served as the first Chief of the Air Staff before taking up command of the Independent Air Force in France. Also present at the unveiling ceremony was Richard Bell-Davies, British First World War fighter pilot and Royal Navy officer, and recipient of the Victoria Cross.

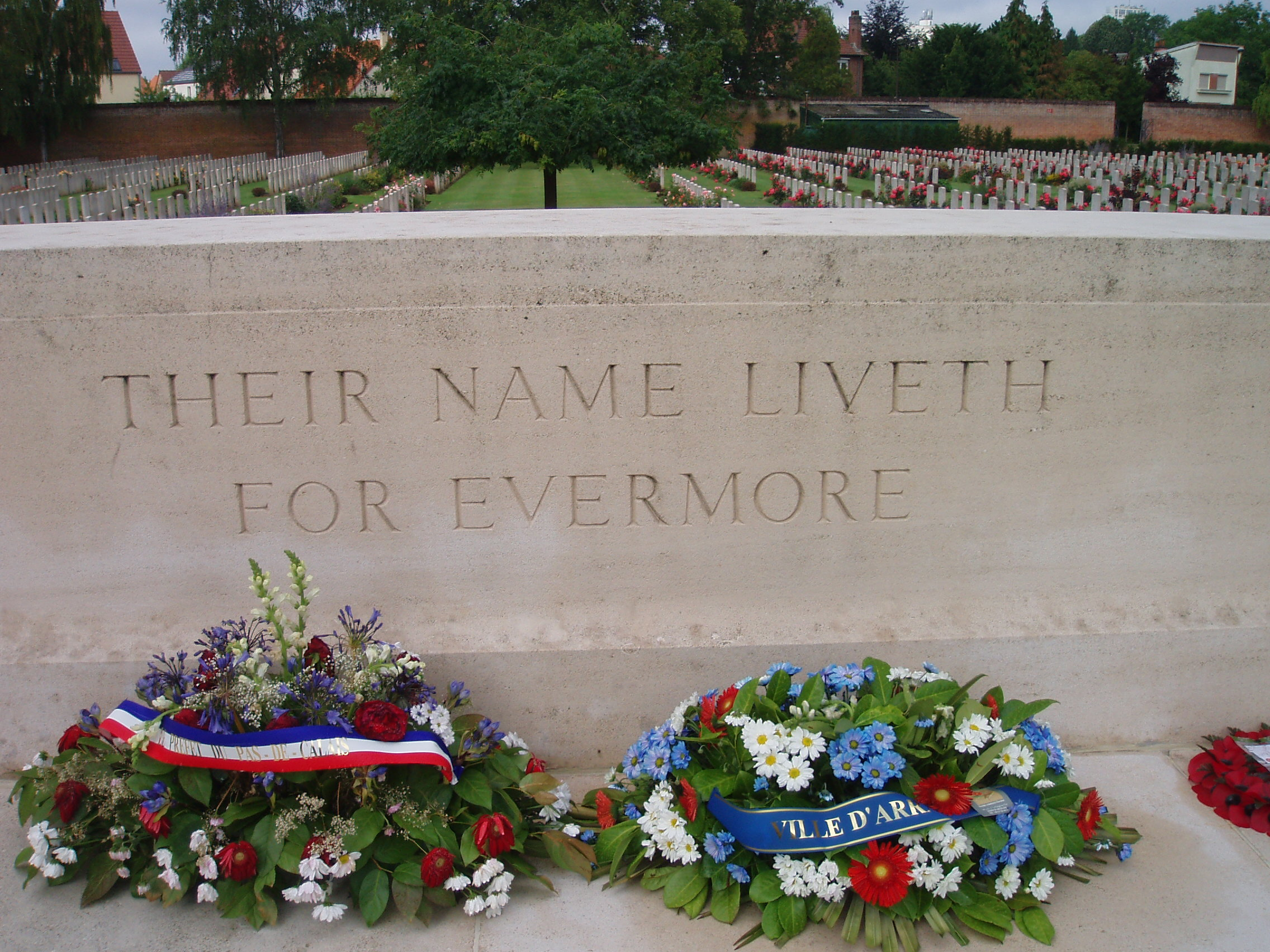
Stone of Remembrance by the memorial, looking towards the cemetery

Those listed on this memorial include poet T.P. Cameron Wilson and the following sportsmen: Isaac Bentham, Dick Harker, Walter Tull, Sandy Turnbull, James Williams, and Cecil Bodington. There are a total of 13 recipients of the Victoria Cross commemorated on the Arras Memorial or the Arras Flying Services Memorial: Ernest Frederick Beal, Bernard Matthew Cassidy, Alexander Edwards, John Erskine, John Harrison, Lanoe George Hawker, David Philip Hirsch, Basil Arthur Horsfall, George Jarratt, Richard Basil Brandram Jones, Edward Mannock, Oliver Cyril Spencer Watson, Albert White.
