= Henry Arthur Hollond =

Henry Arthur Hollond DSO OBE (1884-1974) was Rouse Ball Professor of English Law in the University of Cambridge from 1943 to 18 November 1950. He is author of English Legal Authors Before Blackstone, first published as a periodical article under the title English Legal Authors Before 1700 at 9 Cambridge Law Journal 292, and then reprinted separately in 42 pages by Stevens & Sons Limited in 1947. The work is "short but complete".

He was also author of Frederic William Maitland, 1850-1906: A Memorial Address (1953). He was editor of the Cambridge Studies in English Legal History series.

== Private life ==
He voted against allowing women to gain Cambridge degrees and later married the American academic Marjorie Hollond on 7 September 1929. She was director of studies at two Cambridge colleges and a Cambridge university lecturer in economics. She went on to help the reorganisation in the university in 1948 when women were first allowed to gain a Cambridge degree.
