= Brighton, Hove & Sussex Sixth Form College =

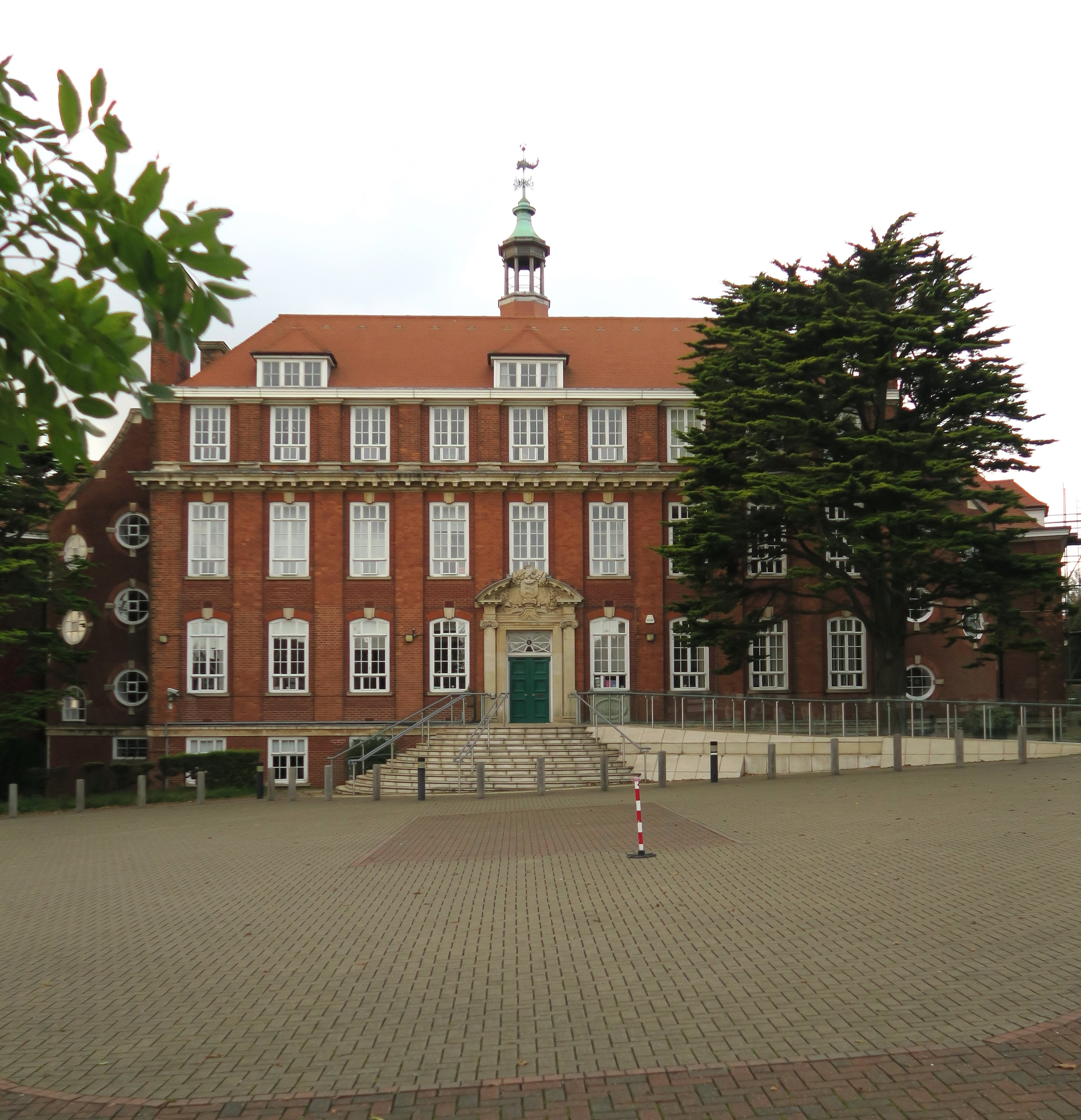
- Main entrance of Brighton, Hove & Sussex Sixth Form College

Location
- 205 Dyke Road; Hove, East Sussex, BN3 6EG; England; 50.834725°N 0.151178°W

Information
- Type: Sixth form college
- Established: 1975
- Department for Education URN: 130669 Tables
- Ofsted: Reports
- Principal: William Baldwin
- Gender: Coeducational
- Age: 16 to 19
- Enrolment: 3,569 students
- Website: www.bhasvic.ac.uk

Brighton, Hove & Sussex Sixth Form College, commonly known as BHASVIC (/ˈbæzvɪk/), is a sixth form college located in the Prestonville area of Brighton, England. The college provides post-16 education, including A-levels, BTECs, and GCSEs.

The college is situated on the corner of Dyke Road (A2010) and Old Shoreham Road (A270), a major road junction in the north-west of the city of Brighton & Hove near Seven Dials.

== History ==
Founding and Early Years

The school traces its origins to the Brighton Proprietary Grammar and Commercial School, founded in 1859. Initially located at Lancaster House, 47 Grand Parade in Brighton, it later became the Brighton, Hove and Sussex Grammar School. In 1913, the school moved to its present site in Prestonville.

World War I and Beyond

During World War I, the college building was requisitioned by the War Office to establish the 2nd Eastern General Hospital, a facility for the Royal Army Medical Corps to treat military casualties. Following the war, the school resumed its educational function and expanded, adding a large library in 1935.

Transition to a Sixth Form College

In 1975, the grammar school system was abolished, and the institution transitioned into a sixth form college, which is known today as BHASVIC. The college moved out of local government control in 1992 under the Further and Higher Education Act and became an independent institution.

== Teaching ==
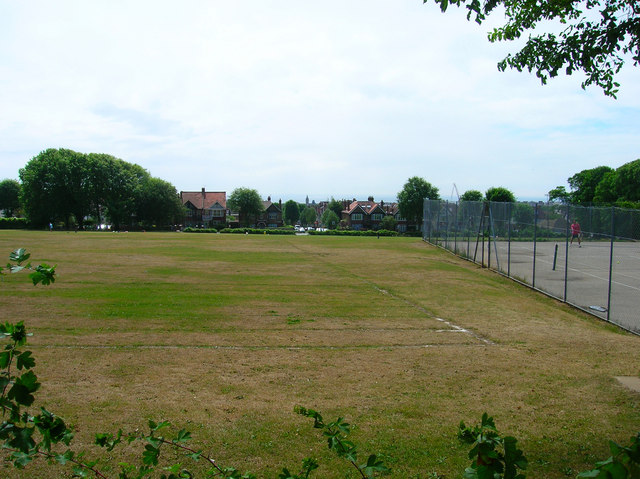
Playing fields

During the 2023-24 academic year, 3,569 students attended the college, most of whom take A-Level courses. The remaining students are enrolled in variety of courses, predominantly BTEC Level 3 or GCSE programmes. Approximately 60% of students are from Brighton and Hove, and up to 40 students come from outside the United Kingdom.

In both the 2012 and 2022 Ofsted inspections, the college received an overall 'Outstanding' rating.

== Funding and governance ==
BHASVIC is an independent corporation formed under the Further and Higher Education Act 1992. Corporation Members (governors) are individuals from business, the local community, staff, students and parents. The principal of the college is an ex-officio member of the corporation. The College is funded predominantly by the Education and Skills Funding Agency (ESFA).

In April 2017, governors decided against seeking academy status.

== The Prime Minister's Global Fellowship ==
The college has a good record of students attaining places on the Prime Minister's Global Fellowship programme. The college achieved its first student in the inaugural year of the programme, 2008 and in 2009 had 2 more successful applicants.

== Notable alumni ==
=== Brighton Hove & Sussex Sixth Form College ===
- Amber Anning, International athlete
- Philippa Gardner, Professor of Theoretical Computer Science, Imperial College London
- Jamie Theakston, television presenter

=== As Brighton, Hove and Sussex Grammar School ===
- Ernest Frederick Beal, Victoria Cross recipient
- Walter Adams, Director from 1967 to 1974 of the London School of Economics (LSE), and Principal from 1955 to 1967 of the University College of Rhodesia and Nyasaland
- Aubrey Beardsley, illustrator
- Professor Henry Bedson, virologist
- Stanley Bindoff, Historian and academic
- Howard Blake, composer
- Neil Brand, film composer
- Charles B. Cochran, theatre producer
- Vice Admiral Anthony Dymock, UK Military Representative to NATO from 2006 to 2008
- Michael Fabricant, Conservative MP from 1992 to 1997 for Mid Staffordshire and since 1997 for Lichfield
- David Feldman, Emeritus Rouse Ball Professor of English Law at the University of Cambridge
- John Gillingham, Professor of History from 1995 to 1998 at the London School of Economics
- John Glover, cricketer
- Bob Goody, actor and writer
- Maj-Gen John Gould, the Army's Paymaster-in-Chief from 1972 to 1975
- Tony Hawks, comedian
- John Hay, Conservative MP from 1950 to 1974 for Henley, and President from 1977 to 1981 of the Council of European Municipalities and Regions
- Gilbert Walter King, judge of the British Supreme Court for China
- Sir Ivan Lawrence, Conservative MP from 1974 to 1997 for Burton
- Rear Admiral John Lippiett, chief executive since 2003 of the Mary Rose Trust
- Vice Admiral Sir Fabian Malbon, commanded HMS Invincible in 1992–93 and Lieutenant Governor of Guernsey 2005–2011
- Keith Simpson, pathologist
- Charles Stapley, actor in Crossroads
- Michael Till, former Dean of Winchester
- Alan Weeks, BBC ice-skating commentator
- Terence Wilton, actor

== See also ==
- Buildings and architecture of Brighton and Hove
- City College Brighton & Hove
