= Faculty of Law, University of Cambridge =

Law school of the University of Cambridge

Coordinates: 52.2017°N 0.1096°E

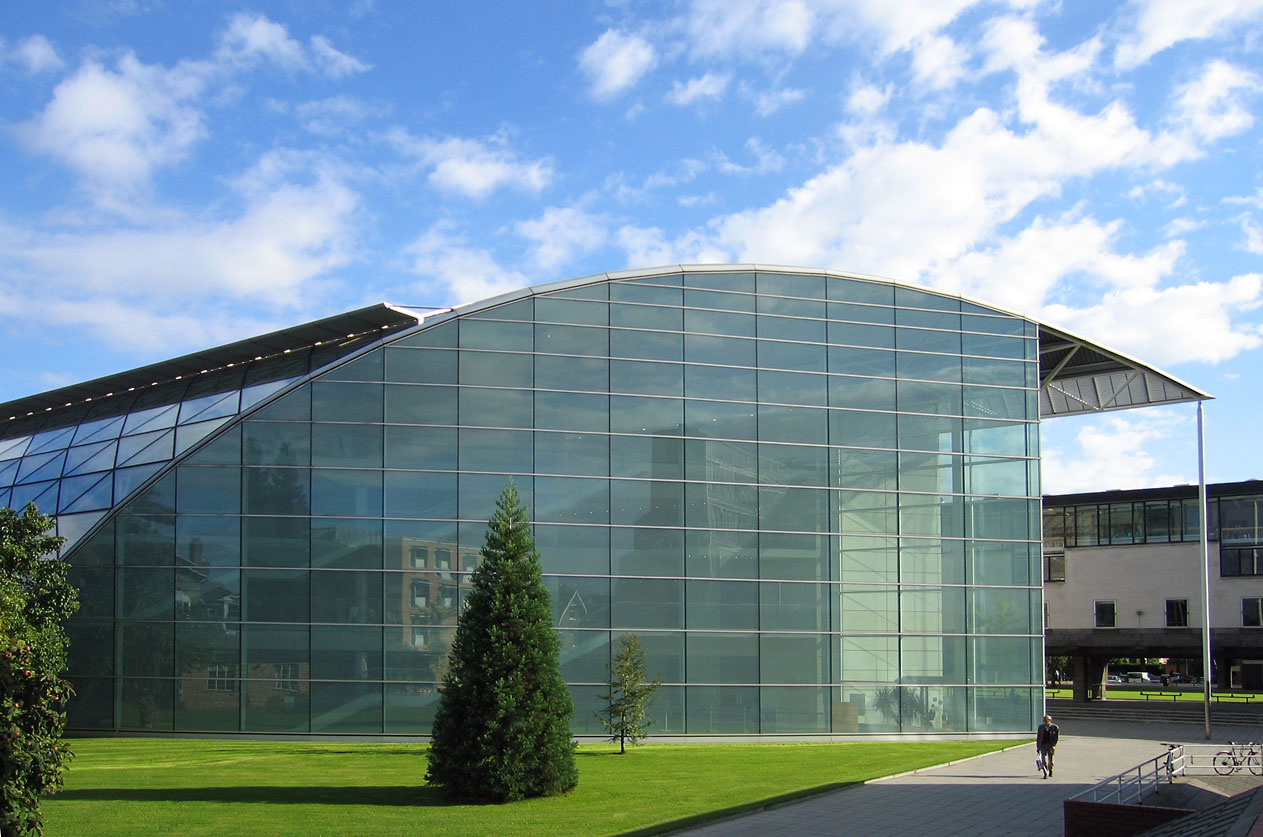
- The Faculty of Law at the University of Cambridge in September 2005
- Undergraduates: 700
- Postgraduates: 250
- Location: Cambridge, Cambridgeshire, United Kingdom
- Campus: Sidgwick Site
- Website: www.law.cam.ac.uk

The Faculty of Law, Cambridge is the law school of the University of Cambridge.

The study of law at the University of Cambridge began in the thirteenth century. The faculty hosts the oldest law professorship in the English-speaking world, the Regius Professorship of Civil Law, which was founded by Henry VIII in 1540 with a stipend of £40 per year for which the holder is still chosen by The Crown. Cambridge is unanimously ranked as the best law school in the UK by all major national academic league tables, and the world's 2nd best law school in 2025.

The present-day faculty incorporates the Institute of Criminology as well as 11 Research Centres, including the world's leading research institute for international law, The Lauterpacht Centre for International Law. The faculty has 31 professors, six readers, and over 70 other university, faculty and college teaching officers. The student body comprises about 700 undergraduate and 250 postgraduate students. It is also home to the Cambridge University Law Society, the largest student-run law society in the United Kingdom and among the largest in the world.

== Courses offered ==
The BA Tripos undergraduate degree at Cambridge is intended to give a thorough grounding in the principles of law viewed from an academic rather than a vocational perspective. The faculty offers the following postgraduate degrees: the LLM, the MCL, the MLitt, the MPhil in Criminology, the MPhil in Criminological Research, the M.St in Applied Criminology, Penology and Management, the M.St in Applied Criminology and Police Management, the PhD in Criminology, and the PhD in Law. In addition, the faculty offers the Postgraduate Diploma in Legal Studies and the Postgraduate Diploma in International Law.

== Rankings and reputation ==
Rankings
National rankings
- Complete (2027): 1
- Guardian (2027): 1
- Times / Sunday Times (2027): 1

Global rankings
- QS (2027): 3
- THE (2026): 2

Cambridge is unanimously ranked as the best law school in the UK by all major national academic league tables. It is currently ranked first by The Guardian, The Times/The Sunday Times' Good University Guide, and The Complete University Guide. Since it started publishing its annual rankings for 2010, The Guardian has ranked Cambridge first six times (2010, 2012, 2015, 2016, 2017, and 2018). The Complete University Guide has given the top spot to Cambridge since 2013 and eight times in the last 11 years. The Times Good University Guide law rankings has Cambridge atop its league table since 2014.

In 2021, THE ranked Cambridge as the world's second best university for law in its 2021 subject rankings. In 2021, the QS World University Rankings ranked Cambridge as the world's third best university for law and legal studies.

== Facilities ==
=== David Williams Building ===
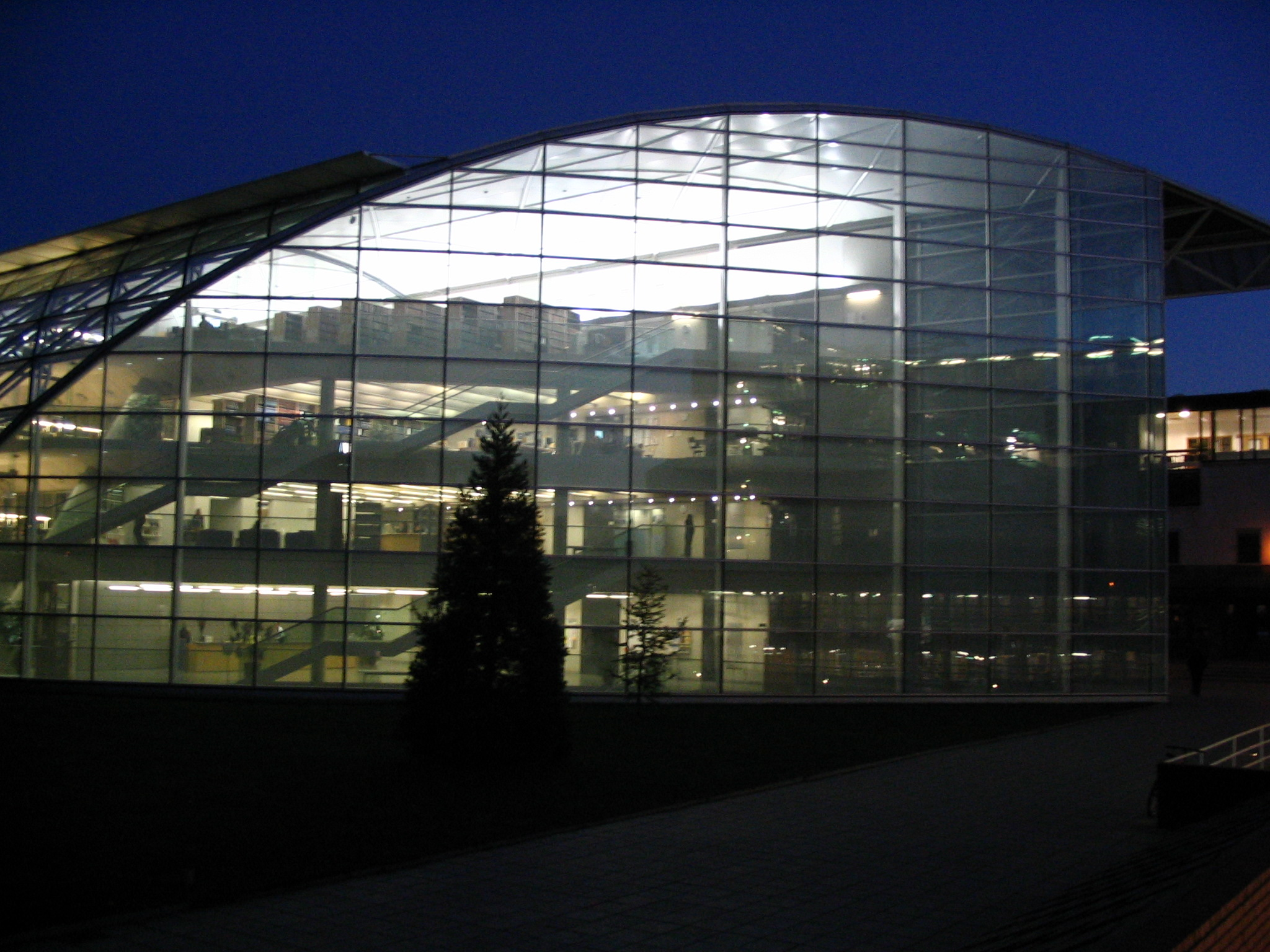
The Faculty of Law, University of Cambridge in the evening

The faculty is housed in the David Williams Building on the university's Sidgwick Site in Cambridge. The building is named after the university's first full-time vice-chancellor and professor of public law, Professor Sir David Williams. It opened in 1996 and was designed by Lord Norman Foster of Thames Bank, who also designed the terminal building at Stansted Airport and 30 St Mary Axe (the "Gherkin" in London). The building suffered serious acoustic problems (primarily due to a lack of consideration of acoustics in Foster's design), with its form amplifying any noise from the lower levels and causing significant disturbance at higher levels, not least in the library. This was fixed in 1999 with the installation of a glazed acoustic screen, separating quiet areas from noisy ones. Other issues still remain: the toilets in the building are often out of order due to plumbing issues. Additionally, due to an excessive focus on the design of the study spaces, the toilets appear to have been an afterthought, being unbearably small and cramped.

The David Williams Building contains the university's Squire Law Library, together with offices, lecture and seminar rooms and common room facilities.

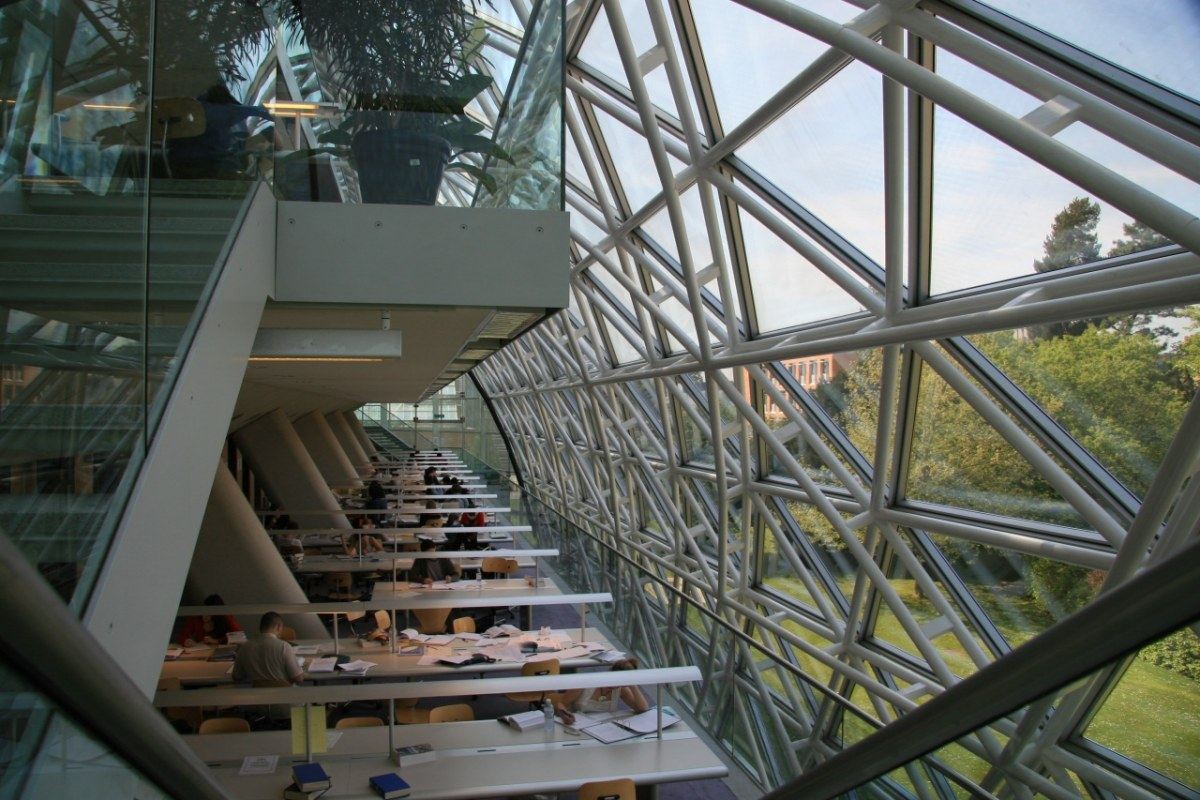
The interior of the faculty building

=== Squire Law Library ===
The Squire Law Library, which occupies the majority of the first, second and third floors of the building, is a dependent library of Cambridge University Library. It contains one of the three largest legal collections in the UK with more than 180,000 volumes. The collection is very strong across UK law, the law of other major common law countries (the United States, Australia, Canada and New Zealand), international law and the law of the European Union, France and Germany. There are also smaller collections for the law of many other countries. The library provides its users with access to many major legal databases.

The library was founded in 1904, at first with only 8,000 volumes, although this soon increased. In 1934, together with the Seeley Historical Library, it moved to the Cockerell Building on Senate House Passage, previously the home of the University Library built in 1837–42. The Squire took over the whole of the Cockerell Building on the construction of James Stirling's building for the history library in 1968. With the Squire's own move in turn, its former site became the library of Gonville and Caius College.

Most individual colleges also have a smaller law library of their own, while the Lauterpacht Centre for International Law has its own library composed of international law books and other related materials.

== Societies ==
There are a number of groups and societies based around the Faculty of Law:

- Cambridge University Law Society
- Cambridge Societies at the Inns of Court (Gray's Inn, Lincoln's Inn, and Middle Temple)
- Graduate Law Society
- The Cambridge University Society for Women Lawyers
- Cambridge University Students' Pro Bono Society
- Cambridge Pro Bono Project
- Exploring Law Conference (formerly the Cambridge Sixth Form Law Conference)
- Cambridge University Human Rights Law Society
- Cambridge University Medical Law Society

Most colleges also have their own law societies.

== Publications ==
Notable publications produced under the aegis of the faculty include:

- University of Cambridge Faculty of Law Legal Studies Research Paper Series
- The Cambridge Law Journal
- International Law Reports
- Clarendon Studies in Criminology (joint venture with the criminology centres at Oxford and the London School of Economics)
- Cambridge Studies in English Legal History
- Cambridge International Law Journal

== Notable persons ==
=== Faculty ===
Named Chairs

- Downing Professor of the Laws of England (vacant since 2024)
- Regius Professor of Civil Law (Helen Scott since 2022)
- Rouse Ball Professor of English Law (Louise Gullifer since 2019)
- Whewell Professor of International Law (Jan Klabbers elected in 2024 to take up the post in 2025)
- Sir David Williams Professor of Public Law (Alison Young since January 2018)
- S.J. Berwin Professor of Corporate Law (Brian Cheffins since 1998)
- Harold Samuel Professor of Law and Environmental Policy (Jorge E. Viñuales since 2013)

Others

- Trevor Allan, Professor of Jurisprudence and Public Law
- Catherine Barnard, Professor of European Union and Labour Law since 2008
- Eilís Ferran, Professor of Company and Securities Law since 2005
- Matthew Kramer, Professor of Legal and Political Philosophy
- Graham Virgo, Professor of English Private Law since 2007
- Richard Fentiman, Professor of Private International Law
- Jonathan Morgan, Professor of English Law
