= Cambridge University Law Society =

Student-run law society of the University of Cambridge

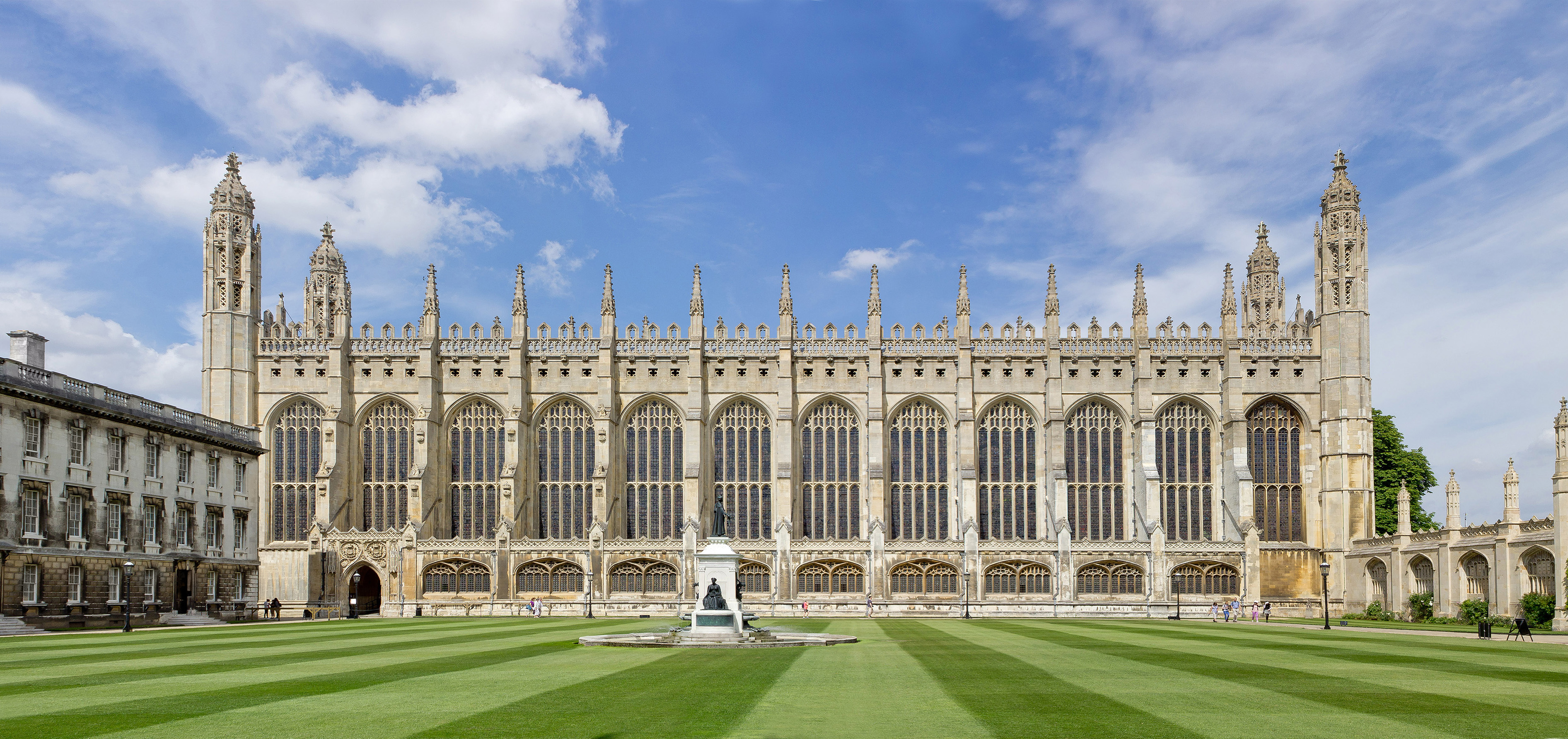
- King's College, Cambridge in August 2013
- Type: Student-run law society
- Established: 1901 (125 years ago)
- Founders: Faculty of Law, University of Cambridge
- Academic affiliations: University of Cambridge
- President: Joyce Mau
- Vice-president: Qinglan Du
- Students: 2,000 (estd.)
- Location: Cambridge, United Kingdom
- Campus: David Williams Building
- Website: www.culs.org.uk

The Cambridge University Law Society (also known as "CULS" or "LawSoc") is the educational and representative body of undergraduate law students at the University of Cambridge. Founded in 1901, and with an estimated 2,000 active members, it is the largest United Kingdom student-led law society and among the largest student-run law societies in the world.

The society founded the Cambridge Law Journal as a student publication in 1921, today the longest-running university law journal in the United Kingdom and the principal publication of the Faculty of Law, Cambridge.

It is known for its Speakers events featuring prominent lawyers, politicians and legal celebrities. It also publishes the Cambridge Law Review and organises the annual University of Cambridge Law Ball, one of the University's most prominent events outside May Week. It is one of the wealthiest societies at the University of Cambridge.

== History ==
CULS was established in January 1901 by the Faculty of Law, Cambridge as an educational body of law students. It had a small membership in its earlier years, and was dormant during World War I. In 1920, it was given increased attention by then Downing Professor of the Laws of England Harold Hazeltine, who delivered its inaugural address. Through the connections of the Faculty, CULS hosted prominent legal figures in the 1920s, including Joseph Henry Beale, Roscoe Pound, Travers Humphreys, and William Buckland. These addresses were academic in nature, and were frequently reproduced in the Cambridge Law Journal. CULS also increased its engagement with other Cambridge University societies, including through debates. By 1977, CULS was the third-largest society by memberships in the University of Cambridge.

== Structure and organisation ==
=== Membership ===
Membership is open to all members of the University of Cambridge. Elected positions are restricted to members of the Society who are undergraduates at the University of Cambridge. The Society is led by an executive committee, which appoints non-executive committees and sub-committees. The President, Vice-President, Treasurer and Secretary are elected officers of the Society, and there are 9 mandatory appointments to the non-Executive Committee.

=== Law Ball ===
Ballet performance at the 2017 Law Ball

The Cambridge University Law Society organises the annual Law Ball, one of the University's most prominent balls outside May Week. The location of the ball is traditionally kept secret until the guests arrive. Guests are given a meeting point and subsequently transported to the venue. These balls are partially sponsored by law firms, and tend to be elaborately themed. Past headliners have included Tinchy Stryder, The Hoosiers, and S Club 3.

=== Per Incuriam ===
The Society's official termly magazine, Per Incuriam, features content by students as well as notable academics and professionals. Notable past contributors include John Laws, Simon Deakin, and David Feldman.

=== Cambridge Law Journal ===
In 1921, the Cambridge University Law Society founded the Cambridge Law Journal as a student publication. As it gained recognition for quality, its management was taken over by the Faculty of Law, University of Cambridge. Today, the Cambridge Law Journal is the longest-running university law journal in the United Kingdom and the principal publication of the Faculty of Law, University of Cambridge. It is edited by Professor John Bell. In 2003, The Cambridge Law Review was founded as a successor student-run academic journal.

=== Honorary presidents ===
Name	From	To
[[Cyril Salmon, Baron Salmon]]	1975	1991
Peter Oliver, Baron Oliver of Aylmerton	1991	2007
Michael Mustill, Baron Mustill	2007	2015
Brenda Hale, Baroness Hale of Richmond	2015	Present

== Notable visitors, lecturers and speakers ==
- Roscoe Pound – former Dean of Harvard Law School
- Joseph Henry Beale – former Royall Professor of Law at Harvard Law School and inaugural Dean of Chicago Law School
- Alfred Denning – former Lord of Appeal in Ordinary and Master of the Rolls
- Cyril Salmon – former Lord of Appeal in Ordinary
- Brenda Hale – President of the Supreme Court of the United Kingdom
- Prince Philip, Duke of Edinburgh
- Elizabeth Butler-Sloss – first female Lord Justice of Appeal
- Igor Judge – former Lord Chief Justice of England and Wales
- Robert Megarry – former Vice-Chancellor of the Supreme Court
- Enoch Powell – former British Minister of Health, politician, classical scholar, philologist, and poet
- Robert Alexander – British barrister, banker and Conservative politician
- Travers Humphreys – British barrister and judge
- Martin Nourse – former Lord Justice of Appeal of England and Wales
- George Baker – President of the Family Division of the High Court of Justice
- Anthony Clarke – former Justice of the United Kingdom Supreme Court
- Conor Gearty – Professor of Human Rights at the London School of Economics
- Robert Winston – British professor, medical doctor, scientist, television presenter and Labour Party politician
- John Alderson – former Chief Constable for Devon and Cornwall and expert on police and penal affairs.
- William Hughes – Labour Party politician
- Raymond Blackburn – Labour Party politician
- Hilel Neuer – Executive Director of UN Watch
- Hugh Tomlinson - British barrister and founding member of Matrix Chambers
