= CULS =

CULS may refer to:

- Cambridge University Law Society, a student-run legal society at the University of Cambridge
- Columbia University Library System, the sixth largest academic library in the United States
- Czech University of Life Sciences Prague, an agricultural university established in 1906
