= Glanville Williams =

Welsh legal scholar (1911-1997)

Glanville Williams QC (Hon) FBA
- Born: Glanville Llewelyn Williams; 15 February 1911; Bridgend, Wales
- Died: 10 April 1997 (aged 86); Cambridge, England

Academic background
- Education: University College of Wales; St John's College, Cambridge

Academic work
- Discipline: Law
- Sub-discipline: Criminal law; English law; jurisprudence
- Institutions: University College, London; Jesus College, Cambridge
- Doctoral students: Stanley Alexander de Smith
- Notable works: Learning the Law (1945–1982); The Proof of Guilt (1955); The Sanctity of Life and the Criminal Law (1957); Criminal Law (1961); Textbook of Criminal Law (1978; 1983)
- Influenced: Sir Gerald Gordon

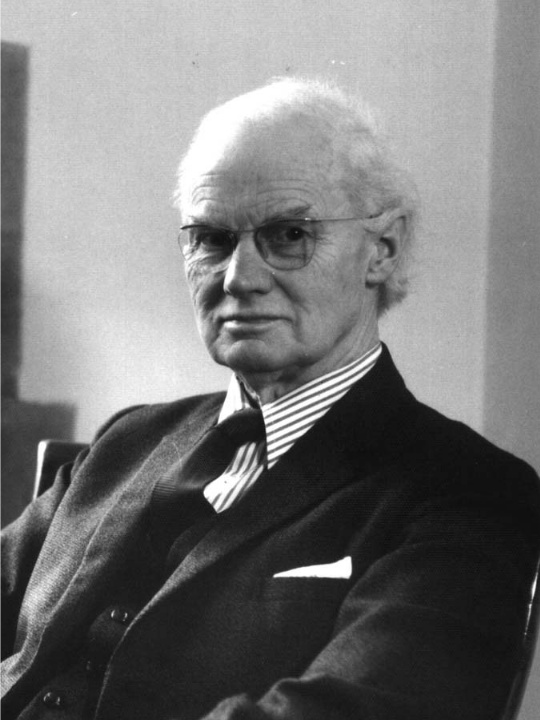
Professor Glanville Llewelyn Williams

Glanville Llewelyn Williams QC (Hon) FBA (15 February 1911 – 10 April 1997) was a Welsh legal scholar who was the Rouse Ball Professor of English Law at the University of Cambridge from 1968 to 1978 and the Quain Professor of Jurisprudence at University College, London, from 1945 to 1955. He has been described as Britain's foremost scholar of criminal law.

== Early life and education ==
Williams was born on 15 February 1911 in Bridgend, Wales. He attended Cowbridge Grammar School (founded in 1608 by Sir Edward Stradling of St. Donat's Castle, Glamorgan) from 1923 to 1927. He obtained a First in law at University College of Wales. He was called to the Bar and became a member of Middle Temple in 1935. He was a Research Fellow from 1936 to 1942 and completed his Doctor of Philosophy degree in law at St John's College, Cambridge, where he was examined by the Vinerian Professor of English Law at Oxford, Sir William Searle Holdsworth, who was at the time, a Fellow of St John's College, Oxford. Holdsworth famously asked whether it had been submitted for an LLD as opposed to a DPhil, as the quality and rigour of the thesis was so great.

Throughout his lifetime he also served as an Honorary and emeritus Fellow of Jesus College, Cambridge, and Honorary Bencher of Middle Temple; and served as the Professor of Public Law and Quain Professor of Jurisprudence at University College, London, from 1945 to 1955.

== Legal career ==
Williams's Textbook of Criminal Law (London: Steven & Sons, 1983) is on a United States list of the most cited legal books. The Textbook of Criminal Law, drew on 50 years of expertise in the area. Williams was well into his seventies when he wrote the 1983 volume. It is a magisterial book written in Socratic style. Williams published multiple articles in top refereed journals, despite advancing age. His groundbreaking Criminal Law: The General Part (Steven & Sons, London, 1961) is still widely read and cited. Similarly, his Textbook of Criminal Law, remains a standard textbook for judges, barristers, professors and students.

Williams's influence in the highest courts was sustained and significant. One notable example is in R v Shivpuri [1986] A.C. 1, where the defendant imported harmless vegetable material akin to snuff believing he was importing drugs. The House of Lords held: "it was immaterial that the appellant was unsure of the exact nature of the substance in his possession in that in any event he believed that he was dealing with either heroin or cannabis the importation of which was prohibited." Lord Bridge of Harwich stated:

I cannot conclude this opinion without disclosing that I have had the advantage, since the conclusion of the argument in this appeal, of reading an article by Professor Glanville Williams entitled "The Lords and Impossible Attempts, or Quis Custodiet Ipsos Custodes?" [1986] CLJ 33. The language in which he criticises the decision in Anderton v Ryan is not conspicuous for its moderation, but it would be foolish, on that account, not to recognise the force of the criticism and churlish not to acknowledge the assistance I have derived from it. I would answer the certified question in the affirmative and dismiss the appeal.

John Spencer, summed up his massive contribution in 1997:

Nowadays Williams is best known as a writer on criminal law, where his fame rests on four books, the influence of which has been enormous. First among these stands his Criminal Law: the General Part (1953), a 900-page text concerned, as he explained in the preface, "to search out the general rules of the criminal law, i.e. those applying to more than one crime". The Proof of Guilt (1955) is a comparative account of the rules by which criminal cases are tried in England and Wales, penetrating in its analysis of the merits of our system as well as its defects. The Sanctity of Life and the Criminal Law (1958) examines the philosophical basis for laws against contraception, sterilisation, artificial insemination, abortion, suicide and euthanasia; when it appeared it was very controversial. The fourth book is his 1,000-page Textbook of Criminal Law (1978). This was a successful student textbook, and would be one still if he had ever managed to finish the third edition, on which he had been labouring for 14 years at the time of his death.

In fact, his range as a writer went far beyond the criminal law. Before turning to the criminal law, Williams had already written what are still the definitive books on a range of other important legal subjects: Liability for Animals (1939), The Law Reform (Frustrated Contracts) Acts (1943) (1945), Crown Proceedings (1948), Joint Obligations (1949), and Joint Torts and Contributory Negligence (1950). In 1947 he had edited Salmond's Jurisprudence.

— Obituary, in J.R. Spencer, Glanville Williams, The Cambridge Law Journal, 56(3), 437-465.

In 2012, Dennis Baker edited a new third edition of Williams' Textbook of Criminal Law, continuing the Socratic style of the originals.

In The Sanctity of Life and the Criminal Law (1957), Williams criticised Christian, especially Roman Catholic, opposition to contraception, artificial insemination, sterilisation, abortion, suicide and euthanasia.

His influential law book Learning the Law (1945), as of 2025 in its eighteenth edition, dubbed itself "Guide, Philosopher and Friend".

== Academic career ==
William was a Reader in English Law then Professor of Public Law and Quain Professor of Jurisprudence at the University of London from 1945 to 1955. He then moved to the University of Cambridge and was a Fellow of Jesus College, Cambridge, and a Reader in Law from 1957 to 1965, then Professor of English Law from 1966 to 1968. He then became the Rouse Ball Professor of English Law from 1968 to 1978. He was elected a Fellow of the British Academy in 1957.

He covered an even wider range of topics in the huge number of articles which, he also found the time to write. He contributed to discussions on many legal subjects. For taking notes, he invented and patented a new form of shorthand (Speedhand Shorthand, 1952). And with Learning the Law (1945), now in its 18th edition, he wrote a little introductory book about law studies which was, and still remains, an important reading for any would-be law student.

Williams's voluminous and sometimes complicated writings are inspired by two big and simple notions. The first is that the law should be clear, consistent and accessible. The second is that law should be humane. He was a convinced utilitarian, who held that punishment was an evil to be avoided unless there was a good reason for imposing it, and for whom "good reasons" meant the well-being of society, not the tenets of religious belief. Hence Leon Radzinowicz's celebrated bon mot about him: "Glanville Williams is the illegitimate child of Jeremy Bentham".

These utilitarian beliefs also underlay Williams's efforts as a law reformer, an activity in which he managed to play two roles at once. The first was the "establishment man". He devoted many hours over several decades to serving on a range of official committees, in particular the Criminal Law Revision Committee, of which he was a member from 1959 to 1980. In this capacity he shares the credit for a number of reports which led, among other things, to the decriminalisation of suicide in 1961 and the radical reform and codification of the law of theft in 1968.

His second role was that of "radical outsider". Working sometimes with others, sometimes on his own, he was adept at stirring up public opinion over matters where official interest in reform was lacking. He took a major part in the campaign to liberalise the law on abortion, which largely succeeded with the Abortion Act 1967. He was also very active in the campaign to legalise voluntary euthanasia, which has so far largely failed. He was both president of the Abortion Law Reform Association, and a vice-president of the Voluntary Euthanasia Society.

In the 1950s he was among the first to draw public attention to the problems children face when giving evidence in sex cases – and was still campaigning on the subject in the 1980s. In 1960 he was the first person publicly to advocate the tape-recording of interviews with suspects in police stations; initially condemned as a silly and impractical idea, 25 years later this became almost universal practice. Perhaps his greatest triumph was in 1986, when a well-timed article persuaded the House of Lords to rule that a person can be guilty of attempt even where the crime in question was impossible of completion: so over-ruling their decision the other way the year before, and expressly over-ruling, for the first time ever, their previous decision in a criminal case.

Glanville Williams was a respected and innovative teacher. He was also very supportive throughout their careers to a number of his junior colleagues. Although a kind man, however, he was rather shy, and not a great socialiser outside the circle of his family. He was brought up in a pious Congregationalist family in South Wales, and much of his background stayed with him. Notwithstanding his great eminence, he remained to the end of his days a quiet-spoken, modest, gentle, serious-minded Welshman. Although an agnostic for most of his life he knew his Bible, and the use of biblical phrases was instinctive to him. "He smote him hip and thigh", he once said, describing an article an American had written criticising Sigmund Freud.

== Honours ==
Academic honours were heaped upon him, culminating in 1995 in a Doctorate of Letters honoris causa from Cambridge. During his lifetime it was widely rumoured that he had never been offered a knighthood because he had been staunchly pacifist before the Second World War, and during it a conscientious objector. The truth, however, is that he was offered one and declined it; partly from modesty, and partly because he thought it incongruous that a man who had refused to wield a bayonet should theoretically bear a sword.

The Jesus College, University of Cambridge Glanville Williams Society meets each year and is attended by over 600 leading Welsh lawyers and their English friends.

In 1976, he was famously impersonated by Campbell McComas, an Australian comedian, at a hoax lecture at Monash University, Melbourne. Many people who knew Williams personally were reportedly fooled by the hoax. Hundreds and hundreds attended, and the lecture ended with the words: "thank you for having me, but you have been had."

== Selected works ==
Books

- Glanville Williams, Criminal Law: The General Part (London: Stevens & Sons, 1953, 2nd edition published 1961).
- Glanville Williams, Textbook of Criminal Law (London: Stevens & Sons,1978, 2nd edition published 1983).
- Glanville Williams, Crown proceedings (1947) (London: Stevens & Sons, 1948).
- Glanville Williams, Joint obligations (London: Butterworth, 1949).
- Glanville Williams, Joint torts and contributory negligence (London: Stevens & Sons, 1951).
- Glanville Williams (edited), Salmond on Jurisprudence (London: Sweet and Maxwell, 1947).
- Glanville Williams, The Law Reform (Frustrated Contracts) Act (1943) (London: Stevens & Sons,1944).
- Glanville Williams, Liability for animals (Cambridge: Cambridge University Press, 1939). (This was his PhD, which was examined by Sir William Holdsworth, who thought it had been submitted for a LLD.)
- Glanville Williams, The mental element in crime (Jerusalem: Magnes Press, Hebrew University, 1965).
- Glanville Williams, The proof of guilt; a study of the English criminal trial (London: Stevens & Sons, 1958).
- Glanville Williams, The sanctity of life and the criminal law (London: Faber and Faber, 1958).
- Glanville Williams (with B. A. Hepple), Foundations of the law of tort (London: Butterworths, 1976).
- Glanville Williams (contributor), Impossibility of performance: by Roy Granville McElroy ... edited with additional chapters by Glanville L. Williams. (Cambridge University Press, 1941).
- Glanville Williams, Learning the Law (London: Sweet & Maxwell, 1945; 18th edition published 2025)

Notable articles (post-1978)

- Glanville Williams, Controlling the Repetitive Dangerous Offender, Medical Law Review, Vol. 1, Issue 1 (January 1993).
- Glanville Williams, Which of You Did It, Modern Law Review, Vol. 52, Issue 2 (March 1989).
- Glanville Williams, Obedience to Law as a Crime, Modern Law Review, Vol. 53, Issue 4 (July 1990).
- Glanville Williams, When Is an Arrest, Modern Law Review, Vol. 54, Issue 3 (May 1991).
- Glanville Williams, Intention and Recklessness Again [article] Legal Studies, Vol. 2, Issue 2 (July 1982).
- Glanville Williams, Offences and Defences,] Legal Studies, Vol. 2, Issue 3 (November 1982).
- Glanville Williams, Innocuously Dipping into Trust Funds, Legal Studies, Vol. 5, Issue 2 (July 1985).
- Glanville Williams, The Unresolved Problem of Recklessness, Legal Studies, Vol. 8, Issue 1 (March 1988).
- Glanville Williams, The Draft Code and Reliance upon Official Statements, Legal Studies, Vol. 9, Issue 2 (July 1989).
- Glanville Williams, Victims and Other Exempt Parties in Crime, Legal Studies, Vol. 10, Issue 3 (December 1990).
- Rationality in Murder – A Reply, Legal Studies, Vol. 11, Issue 2 (July 1991).
- The Meaning of Indecency, Legal Studies, Vol. 12, Issue 1 (March 1992).
- Glanville Williams, Included Offences, Journal of Criminal Law, Vol. 55, Part 2 (May 1991).
- Glanville Williams, Manslaughter and Dangerous Driving, Journal of Criminal Law, Vol. 56, Part 3 (August 1992).
- Glanville Williams, Recklessness Redefined, Cambridge Law Journal, Vol. 40, Issue 2 (November 1981).
- Convictions and Fair Labelling, Cambridge Law Journal, Vol. 42, Issue 1 (April 1983).
- Glanville Williams, Alternative Elements and Included Offences, Cambridge Law Journal, Vol. 43, Issue 2 (November 1984).
- Glanville Williams, Lords and Impossible Attempts, or Quis Custodiet Ipsos Custodes, Cambridge Law Journal, Vol. 45, Issue 1 (March 1986).
- Glanville Williams, Oblique Intention, Cambridge Law Journal, Vol. 46, Issue 3 (November 1987).
- Glanville Williams, The Logic of Exceptions, Cambridge Law Journal, Vol. 47, Issue 2 (July 1988).
- Glanville Williams, Finis for Novus Actus, Cambridge Law Journal, Vol. 48, Issue 3 (November 1989).
- Glanville Williams, The Fetus and the Right to Life, Cambridge Law Journal, Vol. 53, Issue 1 (March 1994).
- Glanville Williams, Attempting the Impossible – A Reply, Criminal Law Quarterly, Vol. 22, Issue 1 (December 1979).

Notable articles (pre-1978)

- Williams, Glanville L. (1939). "Dominion Legislation Relating to Libel and Slander". Journal of Comparative Legislation and International Law. 21 (4): 161–178. ISSN 1479-5949. JSTOR 754588. Possibly Williams's first peer-reviewed article.
- Williams, Glanville (1951). "The Aims of Tort". Current Legal Problems. 4: 137–176. doi:10.1093/clp/4.1.137. ISSN 2044-8422. An Essay Examining the various purposes of actions in Tort, broadly: Appeasement, Justice, Deterrence and Compensation. Appeasement is promptly dismissed as archane. Justice is interwoven within Deterrence and Compensation. Williams concludes that the purpose of actions for torts of intention is Deterrence and Compensatory for other torts. In this essay, Williams also pre-emptively advocates mandatory third-party motor insurance and 'workmen insurance' (legislated as National Insurance).
- Williams, Glanville (1955). "The Definition of Crime". Current Legal Problems. 8: 107–130. doi:10.1093/clp/8.1.107. ISSN 2044-8422. Granted that crimes are treated differently than other legal wrongs, Williams attempts to distinguish the crime from the non-criminal wrong (breach of contract, tort, etc.). He dismantles arguments based upon severity of court order (damages or punishment), social attitude or sense of morality and public vs private damages. Williams finally begrudgingly concludes that only the legal definition can consist: a crime is an act that is legally prosecuted by criminal proceedings.
- Williams, Glanville (1981). "Statute Interpretation, Prostitution and the Rule of Law". In Tapper, C. F. H. (ed.). Crime, Proof and Punishment. London: Butterworths. pp. 71ff. ISBN 978-0-406-56999-8.
- Williams, Glanville (1987). "Oblique Intention". The Cambridge Law Journal. 46 (3): 417–438. doi:10.1017/S0008197300117453. ISSN 1469-2139. JSTOR 4507076. S2CID 247198046. A discussion of the merits of imposing criminal intention whereby a defendant knows that an offence (the acts of which are criminalised) will ensue but has no purpose as to that offence. E.g. a strategic bomber may propose to destroy an airbase knowing that the airbase is situated next to a school. The purpose is not the killing of children, it is recognised that children will die, it is fair to assume that if the strategic bomber could avoid killing children he would, but he goes ahead anyway. This infanticide is of oblique intent.

Published lectures

- Proof of Guilt: Study of the English Criminal Trial 1963
- Mental Element in Crime 1966

Notice

- The preface to Winfield's 1937 textbook of tort gives recognition to Williams for proof reading at the age of 26 – already an honorary LLD.

== See also ==
- List of main criminal law texts in England and Wales

Academic offices
| Preceded by Sir Maurice Amos | Quain Professor of Jurisprudence; 1945–1955 | Succeeded by Dennis Lloyd |
| Preceded by Stanley John Bailey | Rouse Ball Professor of English Law; 1968–1977 | Succeeded by William Wade |
