= Rouse Ball Professor =

Rouse Ball Professor may refer to:

- Rouse Ball Professor of English Law
- Rouse Ball Professor of Mathematics
