= Sir David Williams Professor of Public Law =

Professorship in English public law at the University of Cambridge

- Incumbent; Alison Young from 1 January 2018
- Faculty of Law, University of Cambridge
- Style: Professor
- Type: Professorship
- Residence: University of Cambridge
- Appointer: The Board of Electors to the Sir David Williams Professorship in Public Law, chaired by the Vice-chancellor of the University of Cambridge or his Deputy
- Constituting instrument: Chapter XI, Statutes and Ordinances of the University of Cambridge
- Formation: May 1, 2016
- First holder: Christopher Forsyth
- Salary: £71,404–£186,919

The Sir David Williams Professorship of Public Law is a professorship in English public law, and one of 21 professorships in law at the University of Cambridge. It is named in honour of Sir David Williams, who was Rouse Ball Professor of English Law and Vice-chancellor of the University of Cambridge, and was created with the aim of reflecting and reinforcing the tradition of public law at Cambridge. The professorship is funded with contributions from Sir David Li, the Li family, Robinson College, Cambridge, described at the time as "the most significant benefaction to the Faculty in recent times".

Its holders are chosen based on international recognition in the field of public law, an outstanding record in research and publication, strategic vision and commitment to developing public law scholarship within the University of Cambridge, and the Faculty of Law's profile within that field, and their commitment to excellence in learning and teaching. The incumbent is entitled to a professorial fellowship at Robinson College.

The incumbent is Alison Young, who was formerly Professor of Public Law at the University of Oxford. She was elected on 1 January 2018.

== Sir David Williams Professors of Public Law ==
Name	From	To
Christopher Forsyth	2016	2017
Alison Young	2018	Present

== See also ==
- Rouse Ball Professor of English Law
- Regius Professor of Civil Law (Cambridge)
