= Kurt Lipstein =

Kurt Lipstein QC (19 March 1909 – 2 December 2006) was a German-born legal scholar. Of Jewish descent, Lipstein emigrated after Adolf Hitler's rise to power. Lipstein was a renowned specialist in Roman law and conflict of laws within private international law and public international law and pioneer in comparative law.

Born in Frankfurt am Main, Lipstein earned his Abitur from Goethe-Gymnasium in 1927. He enrolled at the University of Grenoble, and later finished his studies at the University of Berlin. Among his academic advisors were Martin Wolff, Ernst Rabel and Ernst von Caemmerer. In 1934 he emigrated to the United Kingdom, and earned his doctorate at Trinity College, Cambridge, in 1936. His parents perished in the Theresienstadt concentration camp.

After World War II, in which he spent some time in an internment camp as an enemy alien, he became a fellow of Clare College, and served as Professor of Comparative Law at the University of Cambridge (1973–76).

He married Gwyneth Herford in 1944. From 1971 to 1987, Gwyneth Lipstein was a councillor on Cambridge City Council, representing Newnham ward, first for the Labour Party and then for the Social Democratic Party (SDP).
