= George Jarratt =

English Victoria Cross recipient (1891–1917)

George Jarratt VC
- Born: 20 July 1891; Kennington, London, England
- Died: 3 May 1917 (aged 25); Pelves, France
- Military career
- Allegiance: United Kingdom
- Branch: British Army
- Rank: Corporal
- Service number: 55295
- Unit: Royal Fusiliers
- Conflicts: World War I †
- Awards: Victoria Cross

Corporal George Jarratt VC (20 July 1891 − 3 May 1917) was a British Army soldier and an English recipient of the Victoria Cross (VC) the highest and most prestigious award for gallantry in the face of the enemy that can be awarded to British and Commonwealth forces.

== World War I ==
Jarratt was awarded the VC for a deed which took place when he was 25 years old on 3 May 1917 near Pelves, France. He was a corporal in the 8th Battalion, The Royal Fusiliers, British Army during the First World War.

=== Citation ===
For most conspicuous bravery and devotion in deliberately sacrificing his life to save others. He had, together with some wounded men, been taken prisoner and placed under guard in a dug-out. The same evening the enemy were driven back by our troops, the leading infantrymen of which commenced to bomb the dug-outs. A grenade fell in the dugout, and without hesitation Cpl. Jarratt placed both feet on the grenade, the subsequent explosion blowing off both his legs. The wounded were later safely removed to our lines, but Cpl. Jarratt died before he could be removed. By this supreme act of self-sacrifice the lives of these wounded were saved.

— The London Gazette, 8 June 1917

Jarratt's wife Gertrude and their daughter Joyce received his medal from the King on 21 July 1917. His VC is displayed at the Royal Fusiliers Museum in the Tower of London.
