= Albert White (VC) =

- Born: 1 December 1892; Liverpool, England
- Died: 19 May 1917 (aged 24); Monchy-le-Preux, France
- Burial place: Remembered on the Arras Memorial
- Military career
- Allegiance: United Kingdom
- Branch: British Army
- Rank: Sergeant
- Service number: 24866
- Units: South Wales Borderers
- Conflicts: World War I
- Awards: Victoria Cross

Sergeant Albert White VC (1 December 1892 in Liverpool – 19 May 1917) was an English recipient of the Victoria Cross, the highest and most prestigious award for gallantry in the face of the enemy that can be awarded to British and Commonwealth forces.

== Details ==
White was 24 years old, and a sergeant in the 2nd Battalion, The South Wales Borderers, British Army during the First World War when the following deed took place for which he was awarded the VC.

On 19 May 1917 at Monchy-le-Preux, France, Sergeant White, realising during an attack that one of the enemy's machine-guns, which had previously not been located, would hold up the whole advance of his company, dashed ahead to capture the gun. When within a few yards of it, he fell riddled with bullets, having willingly sacrificed his life in an attempt to secure the success of the operation.

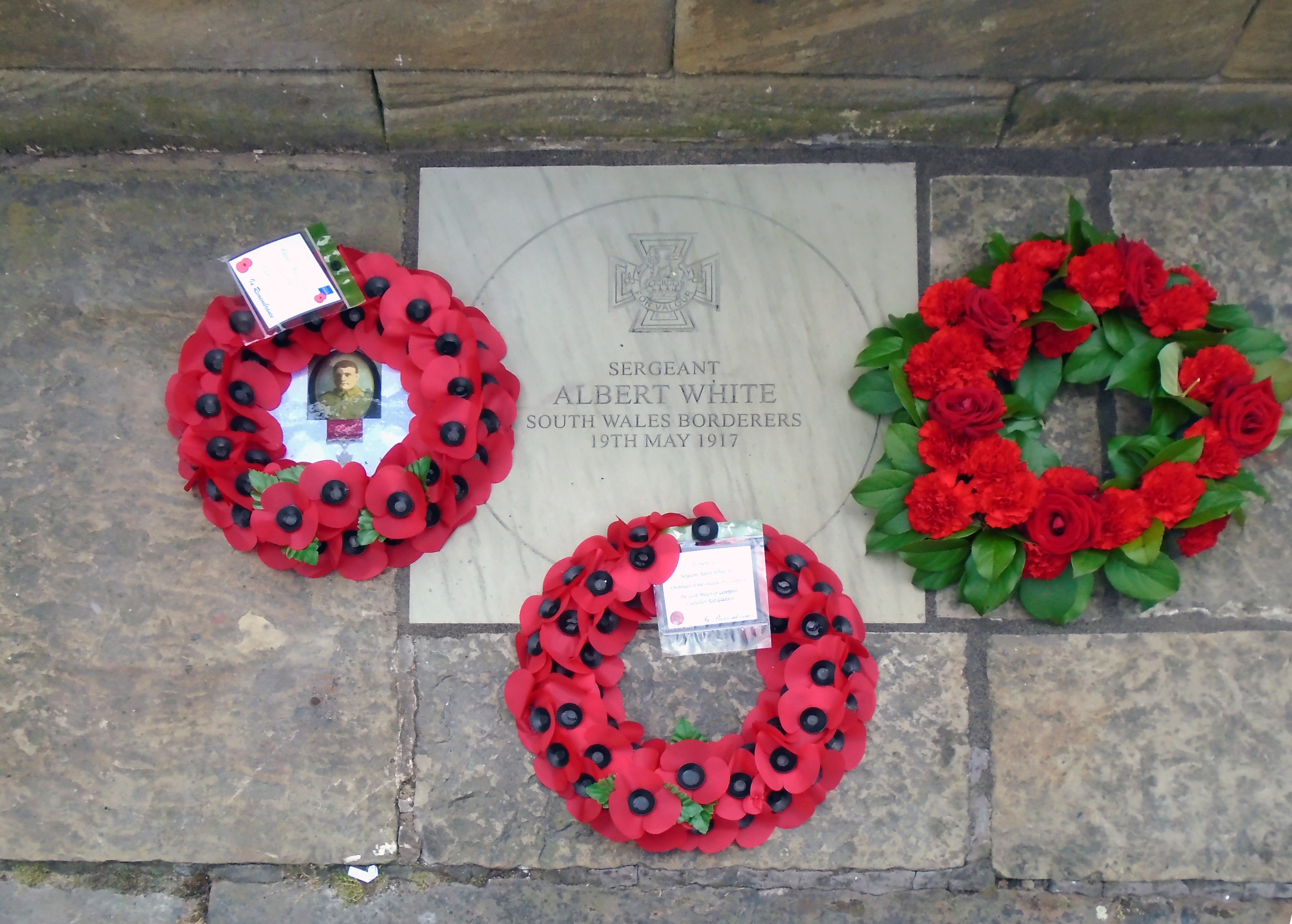
Memorial to Albert White in the garden of the Church of Our Lady and St Nicholas, Liverpool, unveiled on 19 May 2017, 100 years to the day from his death

== Bibliography ==
- Gliddon, Gerald (2012) [1998]. Arras and Messines 1917. VCs of the First World War. The History Press. ISBN 978-0-7524-6604-0.
- Murphy, James (2008). Liverpool VCs. Pen and Sword Books. ISBN 978-1844157808.
