= David Philip Hirsch =

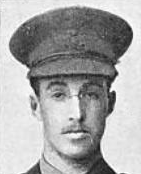
- Born: 28 December 1896; Leeds, West Yorkshire, England
- Died: 23 April 1917 (aged 20); Wancourt, France
- Burial place: Arras Memorial
- Military career
- Allegiance: United Kingdom
- Branch: British Army
- Rank: Captain
- Units: Green Howards
- Conflicts: World War I: Western Front; Battle of Arras †
- Awards: Victoria Cross

David Philip Hirsch VC (28 December 1896 – 23 April 1917) was a British Army officer during World War I and recipient of the Victoria Cross, the highest and most prestigious award for gallantry in the face of the enemy that can be awarded to British and Commonwealth forces.

== Details ==
Hirsch was born 28 December 1896 to Harry and Edith Hirsch of Weetwood Grove, Leeds. Philip's father was Jewish as were his grandparents and although the father later converted to Christianity, it was for 'cosmetic' purposes in business, as Jews were often shunned in the business world due to widespread anti-Semitism (Martin Sugarman AJEX Archives).

He was 20 years old, and an Acting Captain in the 4th Battalion, The Yorkshire Regiment (Alexandra, Princess of Wales's Own), British Army during the First World War. On 23 April 1917 near Wancourt, France, he performed a deed for which he was awarded the Victoria Cross. He died in action that day.

=== Citation ===
2nd Lt. (A/Capt.) David Philip Hirsch, late York R.

For most conspicuous bravery and devotion to duty in attack.

Having arrived at the first objective, Capt. Hirsch, although already twice wounded, returned over fire-swept slopes to satisfy himself that the defensive flank was being established.

Machine gun fire was so intense that it was necessary for him to be continuously up and down the line encouraging his men to dig and hold the position.

He continued to encourage his men by standing on the parapet and steadying them in the face of machine gun fire and counterattack until he was killed.

His conduct throughout was a magnificent example of the greatest devotion to duty.

— London Gazette

== The medal ==
His Victoria Cross is displayed at the Green Howards Regimental Museum, Richmond, North Yorkshire, England.

== Bibliography ==
- Gliddon, Gerald (2012) [1998]. Arras and Messines 1917. VCs of the First World War. Stroud, Gloucestershire: The History Press. ISBN 978-0-7524-6604-0.
