= John Glover (cricketer, born 1992) =

English cricketer

Personal information
- Full name: John Andrew Glover
- Born: 10 October 1992 (age 34); Shoreham-by-Sea, Sussex, England
- Batting: Right-handed
- Bowling: Right-arm medium-fast

Domestic team information
- Years: Team
- 2011: Sussex

Career statistics
Competition	First-class
Matches	1
Runs scored	–
Batting average	–
100s/50s	–/–
Top score	–
Balls bowled	84
Wickets	1
Bowling average	52.00
5 wickets in innings	–
10 wickets in match	–
Best bowling	1/52
Catches/stumpings	–/–
- Source: Cricinfo, 19 April 2013

John Andrew Glover (born 10 October 1992) is an English cricketer. Glover is a right-handed batsman who bowls right-arm medium-fast. He was born at Shoreham-by-Sea, Sussex, and was educated at Hove Park School and Brighton Hove & Sussex Sixth Form College.

Having played for Sussex at various age-group levels, Glover made a single first-class appearance for Sussex against Oxford MCCU at the University Parks in 2011. In a match which ended as a draw, he wasn't required to bat in either of Sussex's innings, but did take a single wicket with the, that of Richard Coughtrie in Oxford MCCU's first-innings to finish with figures of 1/52 from fourteen overs. He had been a member of Sussex's cricket academy since 2010, the year in which he was the academy's player of the season.
