= Marjorie Hollond =

American-born British economist and academic administrator

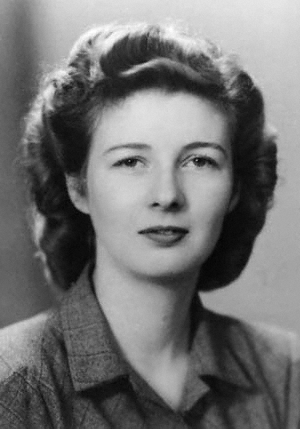
- Born: October 31, 1895; New York City
- Died: January 30, 1977 (aged 81); Cambridge
- Education: Bryn Mawr College; Columbia University
- Occupations: lecturer and college administrator
- Known for: administration
- Spouse: Henry Arthur Hollond

Marjorie Hollond born Marjarie Tappan (October 31, 1895 – January 30, 1977) was an American born British economist and academic administrator.

== Life ==
Hollond was born in New York City in 1895. Her parents were Beatrice (born Haslitt) and Herman Tappan. She had a broad education at Bryn Mawr College from 1911 to 1915 before she specialised and took her doctorate in economics at Columbia University in New York.

After the war she emigrated to England. By 1920 she was in London working at the Galton Laboratory and lecturing part-time at the London School of Economics. She was said to be more interested in teaching than in publishing academic papers.

Hollond was director of studies at two Cambridge colleges, Girton and Newnham from 1923 and a fellow in 1924. She became a Cambridge university lecturer of economics in 1926. She crossed swords over the teaching of economics with Joan Robinson. Robinson wanted to teach the latest economic theories whereas Hollond believed that they were as yet unproven. Robinson became a Cambridge University lecturer in economics in 1937.

Cambridge University was one of the universities that allowed women to attend their courses and to take their exams but it refused to give them an official degree. In the 1920s votes were taken and the motion was not carried. Among those voting against was Henry Arthur Hollond who taught law. She married Henry on 7 September 1929. She gave up the post of director of studies at Newnham in 1933, but she kept the role at Girton.

In 1939 the war started in England and Hollond was involved in war-related work at the Treasury, the Ministries of Agriculture and Fisheries and Economic Warfare. For four months she was assigned to the United Nations Interim Commission of Food and Agriculture, as an associate secretary, and she was a delegate at a food/ agriculture conference in Washington DC.

Hollond began to work again at Girton in 1946 and she went on to help the reorganisation in the university in 1948 when women were first allowed to gain a Cambridge degree. Her financial and organisation skills were recognised when in 1951 she was asked to join Cambridge University's Finance board.

Hollond died in 1977 at her home in Cambridge.
