= Stanley John Bailey =

Stanley John Bailey (1901–1980) was Rouse Ball Professor of English Law in the University of Cambridge from 1950 to 1968. He was author of The Law of Wills (Pitman's Equity Series: 1st Ed, 1935; 2nd Ed, 1940; 3rd Ed, 1948; 4th Ed, 1953; 5th Ed, 1957; 6th Ed, 1967; 7th Ed, 1973), an "introductory survey" which was "well known" and "extremely readable". He was editor of the Cambridge Law Journal from 1948 to 1954. He wrote articles for that journal and for the Law Quarterly Review. He was a Fellow of St John's College.
