= Campbell McComas =

Australian comedian writer and actor

Geoffrey Campbell McComas AM (2 May 1952 – 8 January 2005) was an Australian comedian, writer and actor.

== Early life and education ==
McComas attended Caulfield Grammar School and Scotch College in Hawthorn, Melbourne, and studied law and arts at Monash University.

He was the son of former radio 3DB broadcaster Geoff McComas.

== Career ==
After practising law for several years, he became one of Australia's most renowned public speakers and comedians.

McComas's start in comedy was in May 1976, when he made his famous hoax lecture at Monash pretending to be Glanville Williams, "alternative professor of English law at University of Cambridge". The lecture was given to around 450 students, though it has often been remarked that thousands of people claim to have attended the lecture. Even those who knew Williams were reportedly fooled by the hoax. McComas then made a professional career out of similar stunts, hired by various organizations to perform in character as a "guest speaker". In August 1976, he was signed up by The Don Lane Show as its resident satirist.

McComas is probably best known to the wider general public, however, through his chairing televised comedy "debates" at the Melbourne International Comedy Festival. He regularly appeared on ABC radio, and created over 1800 characters for impersonations. In 2004, he was made a Member of the Order of Australia for his service to entertainment.

McComas died in early 2005 after a short battle with leukaemia. He was survived by his wife, Wendy, and son from his first marriage, Alistair, who was also a law student at Monash.

== See also ==
- List of Caulfield Grammar School people
