= Learning the Law =

First edition (publ. Stevens & Sons)

Learning the Law is a book written by Glanville Williams and edited by him and A. T. H. Smith. It professes to be a "Guide, Philosopher and Friend".

The tome is a "standard" work which has been called a "classic", and said to be "useful" and "most original". The Law Journal said they expected it to become a vade mecum for those studying law. The University of London encouraged their students to use the book.

The first eleven editions are by Glanville Williams. The First and Second Editions were published in 1945, the Third in 1950, the Fourth in 1953, the Fifth in 1954, the Sixth in 1957, the Seventh in 1963, the Eighth in 1969, the Ninth in 1973, the Tenth in 1978, the Eleventh in 1982, the Twelfth in 2002, the Thirteenth in 2006, the Fourteenth in 2010, the Fifteenth in 2013, and the Sixteenth in 2016.

A Second Impression Revised of the Second Edition was published in 1946. The Seventh, and Ninth to Eleventh, Editions also had more than one impression. The book has been published both in hardback and paperback.
