= David Feldman (legal scholar) =

British legal academic and former judge

Professor David Feldman KC (Hon) FBA FRSA
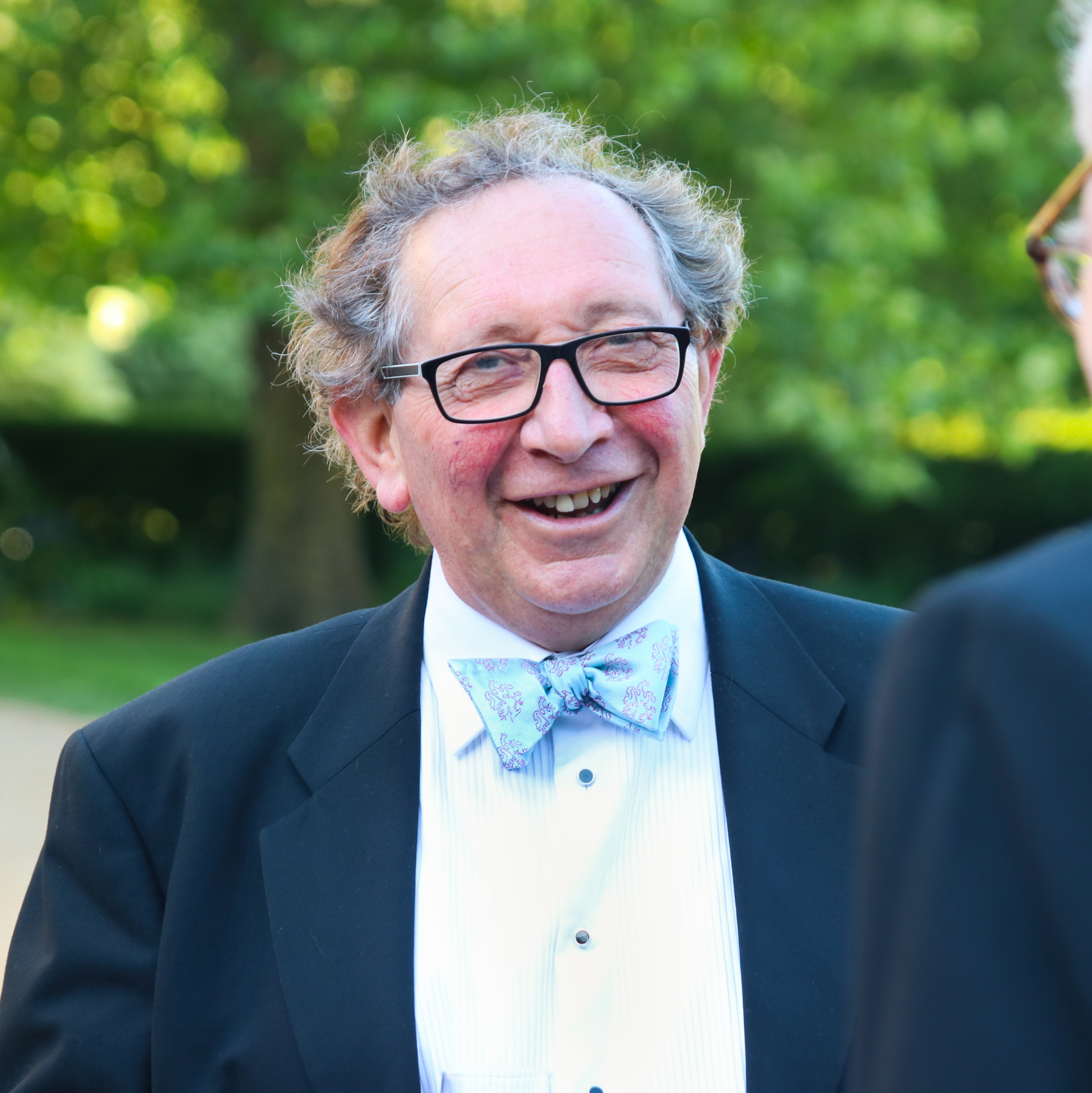
- Feldman in conversation with Robert Reed, Lord Reed at the Cranworth Law Society Annual Dinner 2018
- Born: David John Feldman; Brighton and Hove, East Sussex
- Occupation: Emeritus Rouse Ball Professor of English Law
- Known for: The Cambridge Companion to Public Law; Law in Politics, Politics in Law; The Law Relating to Entry, Search and Seizure; Civil Liberties and Human Rights in England and Wales
- Spouse: Jill Feldman

Academic background
- Education: Exeter College, Oxford

Academic work
- Discipline: Law
- Sub-discipline: Jurisprudence, legal system, public law, constitutional and administrative law
- Institutions: Downing College, Cambridge; University of Birmingham; University of Bristol; Australian National University
- Main interests: Constitutionalism, law, politics and public administration

David John Feldman KC (Hon) FBA FRSA (/fɛldmən/) is a British legal academic, author and former judge. He is Emeritus Rouse Ball Professor of English Law at the University of Cambridge, and served as an international judge of the Constitutional Court of Bosnia and Herzegovina under the Dayton Agreement from 2002 to 2010. He is known for having shaped the development of civil liberties and human rights law in the United Kingdom.

Feldman is an Emeritus Fellow of Downing College, Cambridge, an Honorary Bencher at Lincoln's Inn and an Academic Associate at 39 Essex Chambers. He has served as Chairman of the Faculty of Law, University of Cambridge and the Faculty of Human, Social, and Political Science, and as President of the Society of Legal Scholars.

== Early life and education ==
Feldman was born in Brighton, the grandson of immigrants from Eastern Europe, and received his early education at Brighton Hove & Sussex Sixth Form College. Upon graduating, he applied unsuccessfully to read Law and History at the University of Bristol. Having been advised that confining his application to one subject would improve his chances, he applied the following year to read law. His choice of law over history was influenced by his childhood admiration of Marshall Hall and Perry Mason. He was accepted to Exeter College, Oxford to read law and graduated in 1976 with a first-class honours B.A. in Jurisprudence. He subsequently also received his first-class honours B.C.L. and D.C.L. from Exeter College, Oxford. During his time at Oxford, he studied under Stephen Cretney, a future Dean of the Faculty of Law of the University of Bristol.

== Career ==
=== Academic career ===
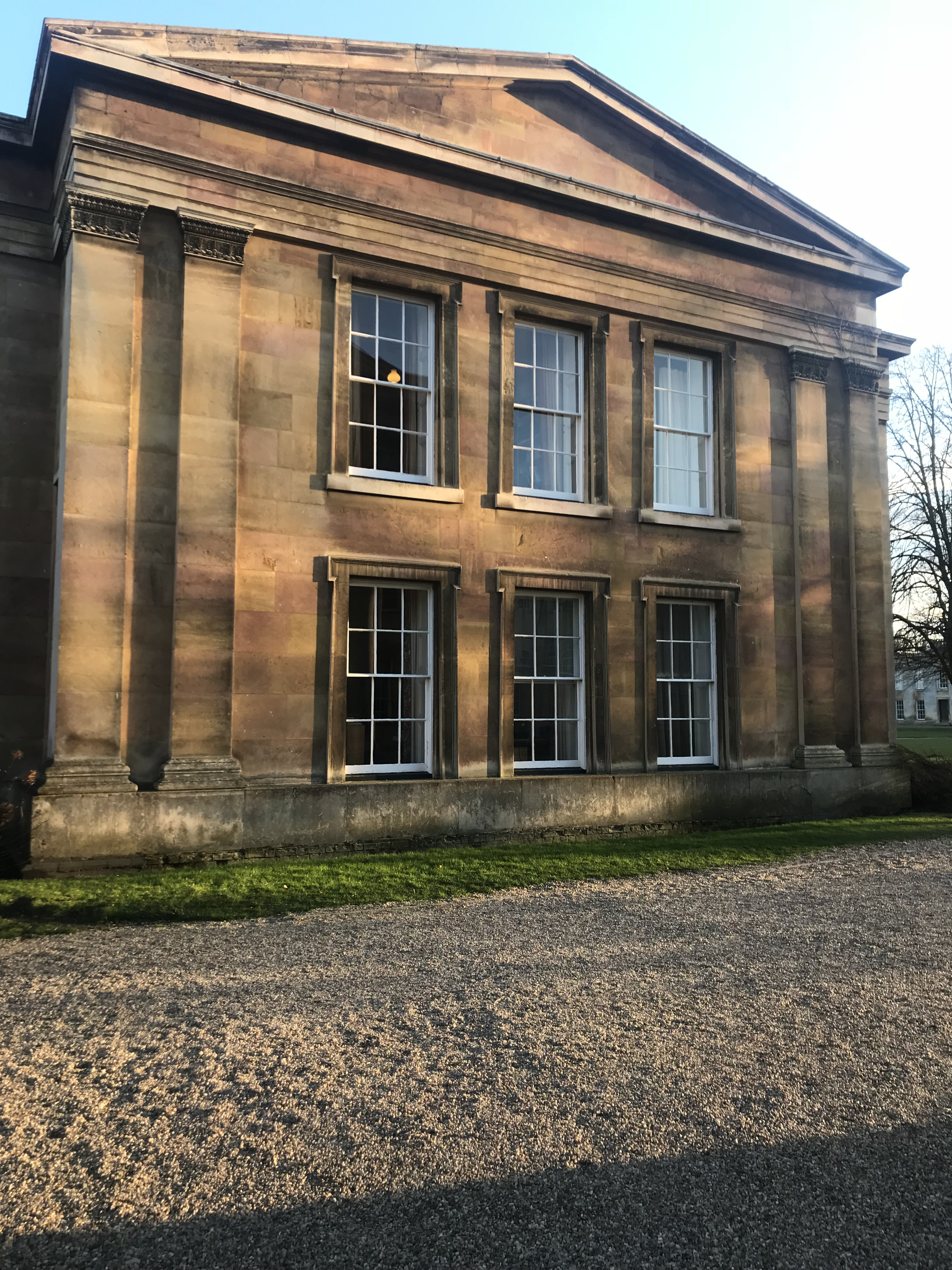
Professor Feldman's office in Downing College, Cambridge

In 1976, Cretney advised Feldman of an available lectureship in law at the University of Bristol. Feldman chose to accept the lectureship over completing the Bar course, and worked as lecturer in law at the University of Bristol until 1989, when he was appointed Reader in Law. That year, he was also Visiting Fellow at the Australian National University.

In 1992, he was appointed Barber Professor of Jurisprudence at the University of Birmingham, and he served concurrently as Dean of the Faculty of Law from 1997 to 2000. In 2000, he was appointed Professor of Law, which he performed alongside his responsibilities as Legal Adviser to Parliamentary Joint Select Committee on Human Rights until 2004. He also took up his judicial appointment at the Constitutional Court of Bosnia and Herzegovina in this period.

In 2004, he was appointed Rouse Ball Professor of English Law at the University of Cambridge, and a Fellow of Downing College, Cambridge. From 2006 to 2009, he was Chairman of the Faculty Board of Law. Thereon, he took on a number of senior honorary visiting fellowships, including the Miegunyah Distinguished Visiting Fellowship at the University of Melbourne and the Sir John C. Smith Senior Visiting Scholarship at the University of Nottingham. From 2013 to 2016, he was Chairman of the Faculty of Human, Social, and Political Science, University of Cambridge. He was President of the Society of Legal Scholars from 2010 to 2011, and the outgoing Director of the Centre for Public Law at the University of Cambridge. Feldman retired as Rouse Ball Professor of English Law on 30 September 2018, and was succeeded by Louise Gullifer.

=== Parliamentary career ===
From 2000 to 2004, he was Legal Adviser to the Parliamentary Joint Select Committee on Human Rights of the Westminster Parliament. He was Specialist Adviser to the Joint Select Committee on the Detention of Terrorist Suspects (Temporary Extension) Bills in 2011.

=== Judicial career ===
In 2002, the President of the European Court of Human Rights appointed Feldman a judge on the Constitutional Court of Bosnia and Herzegovina, the second-highest judicial authority in Bosnia and Herzegovina. In a speech, David Clarke noted that "Professor David Feldman...has the distinction of achieving high judicial office without ever having to venture into the practice of the law beforehand. Although the post was expected to last five years, he served as judge until 2010. He was Vice-President of the court from 2006 to 2009. His work as a judge influenced his perspectives on constitutions, the rule of law, and the role and authority of courts.

== Academic interests ==
Feldman's academic and teaching interests cover administrative law, civil liberties, constitutional law (particularly in an international and comparative perspective) and human rights. He is credited with writing or editing textbooks on public law, law in politics, civil liberties and human rights, corporate and commercial law, and criminal investigation.

== Awards and recognitions ==
Feldman was made an Honorary Bencher at Lincoln's Inn in 2003, and elected to the British Academy in 2006. He was appointed Queen's Counsel honoris causa in 2008, "for his work in public law fields, particularly civil liberties and human rights". He was also awarded the Doctor of Laws honoris causa by the University of Bristol in 2013.

== Bibliography ==
- English Public Law (ed.) (Oxford University Press, 2004)
- Civil Liberties and Human Rights in England and Wales 2nd ed (Oxford University Press, 2002)
- Criminal Confiscation Orders — The New Law (Butterworths, 1988)
- The Law Relating to Entry, Search and Seizure (Butterworths, 1986)
