= Ernest Frederick Beal =

English Victoria Cross recipient (1883–1918)

- Born: 27 January 1883; Brighton, Sussex, England
- Died: 22 March 1918 (aged 35); St-Léger, France
- Military career
- Allegiance: United Kingdom
- Branch: British Army
- Service years: 1914–1918
- Rank: Second Lieutenant
- Units: Sussex Yeomanry; Royal Sussex Regiment; The Green Howards
- Conflicts: World War I: Western Front; German spring offensive †
- Awards: Victoria Cross

Ernest Frederick Beal VC (27 January 1883 – 22 March 1918) was an English recipient of the Victoria Cross, the highest and most prestigious award for gallantry in the face of the enemy that can be awarded to British and Commonwealth forces.

Beal was born to John J. W. and Jane Stillman Beal, who resided at 55, East St., Brighton.

== Military ==
Beal was 35 years old, and a temporary second lieutenant in 13th Battalion, The Yorkshire Regiment (Alexandra, Princess of Wales's Own), British Army during the First World War, and was awarded the Victoria Cross for his actions on 21/22 March 1918 at St-Léger, France.

For most conspicuous bravery and determined leading when in command of a company detailed to occupy a certain section of trench. When the company was established, it was found that a considerable gap of about 400 yards existed between the left flank of the company and the neighbouring unit, and that this gap was strongly held by the enemy. It was of vital importance that the gap should be cleared, but no troops were then available. Organising a small party of less than a dozen men, he led them against the enemy. On reaching an enemy machine gun, 2nd Lt. Beal immediately sprang forward, and with his revolver killed the team and captured the gun. Continuing along the trench he encountered and dealt with another machine gun in the same manner, and in all captured four enemy guns, and inflicted severe casualties. Later in the evening, when a wounded man had been left in the open under heavy enemy fire, he, regardless of danger, walked up close to an enemy machine gun and brought in the wounded man on his back. 2nd Lt. Beal was killed by a shell on the following morning.

— London Gazette, 31 May 1918

== Commemoration ==
Beal is commemorated on the Arras Memorial. His Victoria Cross is displayed at the Green Howards Museum, Richmond, North Yorkshire, England. Two Brighton & Hove buses have been named after him. Additionally, he is named on the panels commemorating the fallen from the First World War in the hall of Brighton, Hove and Sussex Sixth Form College, for alumni of the preceding institution, Brighton, Hove and Sussex Grammar School.

A gold locket containing Beale's portrait and decorated with a Victoria Cross emblem was shown by his great-nephew, in an episode of Antiques Roadshow in December 2021.

== Bibliography ==
- Monuments to Courage (David Harvey, 1999)
- The Register of the Victoria Cross (This England, 1997)
- Gliddon, Gerald (2013) [2004]. Spring Offensive 1918. VCs of the First World War. Stroud, Gloucestershire: The History Press. ISBN 978-0-7524-8730-4.
