= Cecil Bodington =

English cricketer

Personal information
- Full name: Cecil Herbert Bodington
- Born: 20 January 1880; Suffield, Norfolk, England
- Died: 11 April 1917 (aged 37); Near Arras, Pas-de-Calais, France
- Batting: Right-handed
- Bowling: Unknown

Domestic team information
- Years: Team
- 1901–1902: Hampshire

Career statistics
Competition	First-class
Matches	10
Runs scored	154
Batting average	11.00
100s/50s	–/–
Top score	36
Balls bowled	375
Wickets	9
Bowling average	31.88
5 wickets in innings	–
10 wickets in match	–
Best bowling	3/19
Catches/stumpings	4/–
- Source: Cricinfo, 19 January 2010

Cecil Herbert Bodington (20 January 1880 – 11 April 1917) was an English cricketer and educator.

The son of The Reverend Herbert James Bodington, he was born in January 1880 at Suffield, Norfolk. He was educated firstly at a national school in Overstrand, before going to Charterhouse School on a junior scholarship in 1893. Three years later he went up to The King's School, Canterbury on a senior scholarship, where he played both rugby union and cricket for the school. From there, he matriculated to Peterhouse, Cambridge. At Cambridge, he was a member of Cambridge University Cricket Club but did not play at first-class level for the university. However, he did play first-class cricket during his studies in 1901 and 1902 for Hampshire on ten occasions, making nine appearances in the County Championship and a further appearance against the touring Australians. In these matches, he scored 154 runs at an average of exactly 11, with a highest score of 36. With the ball, he took 9 wickets at a bowling average of 31.88, with best figures of 3 for 19.

After graduating from Cambridge, he went to The Cape. From there, he went to British India, where he was tutor to three sons of the Maharaja of Kapurthala. He later returned to England, where he became an assistant master at Elstree School and Stanmore Park Preparatory School. Bodington served in the British Army during the First World War, being commissioned as a temporary second lieutenant in November 1914, the same month in which he was appointed to the Household Battalion. He was made a temporary lieutenant in April 1916, before being appointed a temporary captain in September of the same year. Bodington was killed in action on 11 April 1917 during the Battle of Arras.
