= Alison Young (legal scholar) =

British legal scholar

Alison L. Young is a British legal scholar, specialising in public law and constitutional theory. Since January 2018, she has been Sir David Williams Professor of Public Law at the University of Cambridge and a Fellow of Robinson College, Cambridge. She was previously a tutor in law and Fellow of Balliol College, Oxford (1997–2000) and of Hertford College, Oxford (2000–2017), and a lecturer then Professor of Public Law in the Faculty of Law, University of Oxford.

Young grew up on a council estate. She studied law and French at the University of Birmingham, graduating with a Bachelor of Laws (LLB) degree. She then matriculated into Hertford College, Oxford to undertake postgraduate studies in law, and graduated from the University of Oxford with Bachelor of Civil Law (BCL) and Doctor of Philosophy (DPhil) degrees.

She was a runner up for the Inner Temple Book Prize 2018 for her monograph Democratic Dialogue and the Constitution (2017).

Since March 2024, Young has served as the Law Commissioner for Public Law and the Law in Wales.

== Selected works ==
- Young, Alison (2008). Parliamentary sovereignty and the Human Rights Act. London: Hart Publishing. ISBN 9781841138305.
- Rawlings, Richard; Leyland, Peter; Young, Alison, eds. (2013). Sovereignty and the law: domestic, European, and international perspectives. Oxford: Oxford University Press. ISBN 978-0199684069.
- Young, Alison L. (2017). Democratic dialogue and the constitution. Oxford: Oxford University Press. ISBN 9780198783749.
- Elliott, Mark; Williams, Jack; Young, Alison L., eds. (2018). The UK constitution after Miller: Brexit and beyond. London: Hart Publishing. ISBN 9781509916412.
