= Louise Gullifer =

Rouse Ball Professor of English Law at the University of Cambridge

Louise Gullifer KC (Hon) FBA
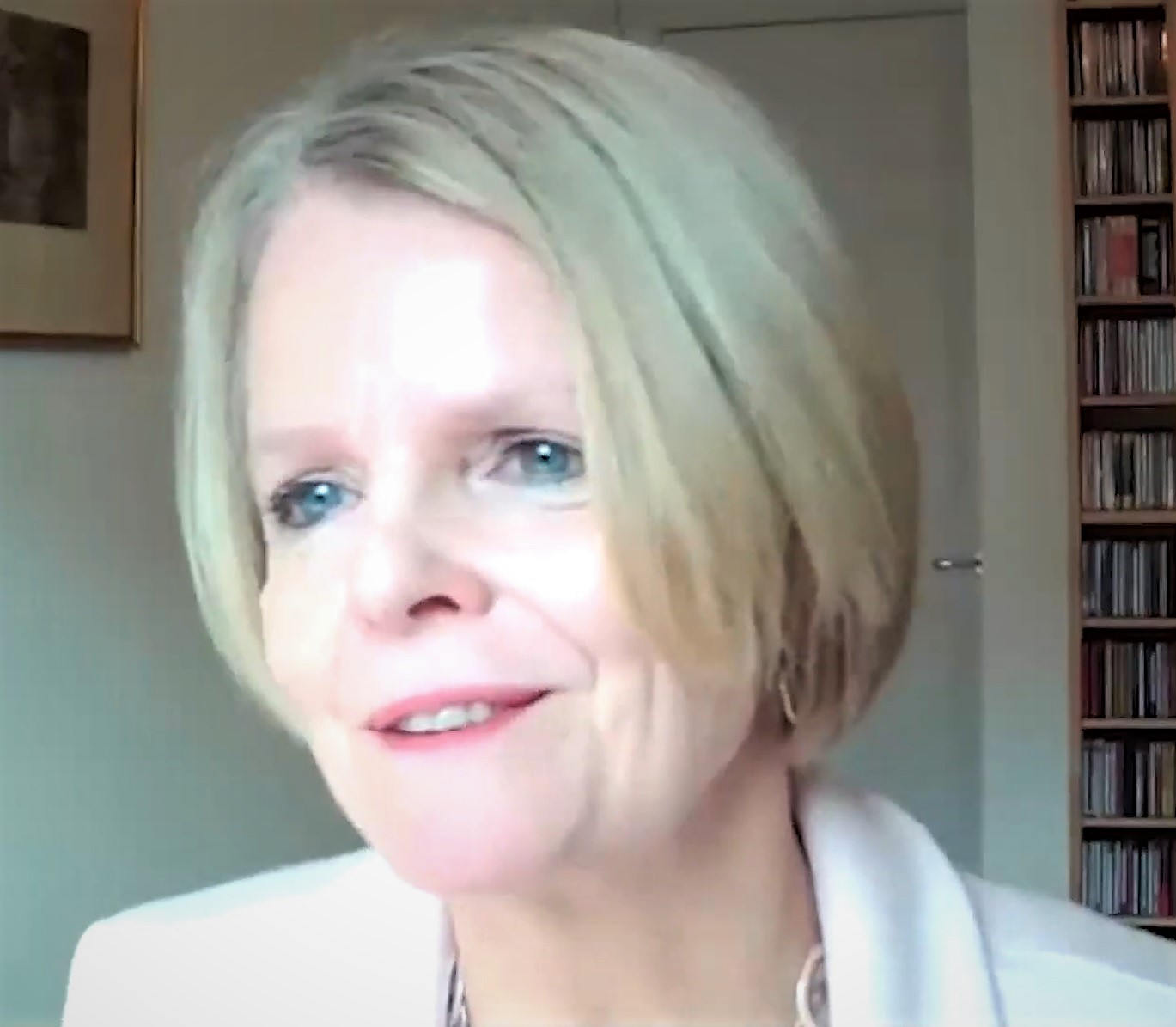
- Gullifer in a video for the Cambridge Law Faculty in 2020
- Born: Louise Edwards
- Known for: Goode and Gullifer on Legal Problems of Credit and Security
- Title: Rouse Ball Professor of English Law

Academic background
- Education: University of Oxford

Academic work
- Discipline: Law
- Sub-discipline: Financial law, Commercial law
- Institutions: Gonville and Caius College, Cambridge

Louise Joan Gullifer KC (Hon) FBA is a British legal academic and barrister who is Rouse Ball Professor of English Law and current Chair of the Law Faculty Board at the University of Cambridge. She is the first woman to hold this professorship and was formerly Professor of Commercial Law at the University of Oxford. She is known for her contributions to English law both as an academic, and for representing the United Kingdom as delegate to United Nations Commission on International Trade Law and UNIDROIT. She is a Bencher of Gray's Inn.

== Education and career ==
Gullifer decided to pursue a career as a barrister from the age of fourteen, after watching a television programme about the English Bar. She graduated with a first-class honours Bachelor of Arts degree in Jurisprudence in 1982 and subsequently a Bachelor of Civil Law degree in 1983, both from Hertford College, Oxford. Upon graduation, she practiced law as a barrister for six years. In 1991, she took up an opportunity to assist Roy Goode in setting up a commercial law course at Oxford, following which she was offered a permanent teaching position. She was a fellow of Brasenose College, Oxford, from 1994 to 1997.

In 2000, she took up a fellowship at Harris Manchester College, Oxford and was appointed Professor of Commercial Law. In 2017, she was appointed to a temporary professorship in international commercial law at Radboud University Nijmegen. She was elected Fellow of the British Academy in 2019. On 1 October 2019, she was elected Rouse Ball Professor of English Law in the University Of Cambridge, following the retirement of her predecessor David Feldman. She is the first woman to hold this professorship. She has held visiting professorships at the National University of Singapore, City University of Hong Kong, Leiden University, and Paris-Sorbonne University. The Gullifer Fellowship in Law at Harris Manchester College, Oxford is named after Louise as a tribute to her scholarship. The fellowship is currently held by Professor Kristin van Zwieten.

Gullifer is a General Editor of the Cambridge Law Journal and was the Founding Director of the Commercial Law Centre at Harris Manchester College, Oxford.

== Selected works ==
- Gullifer, Louise; Payne, Jennifer (2020). Corporate finance law: principles and policy (Third ed.). Oxford and New York: Hart. ISBN 978-1509929177.
