= John Bell (legal scholar) =

British academic

The Reverend John Bell KC FBA FRSA
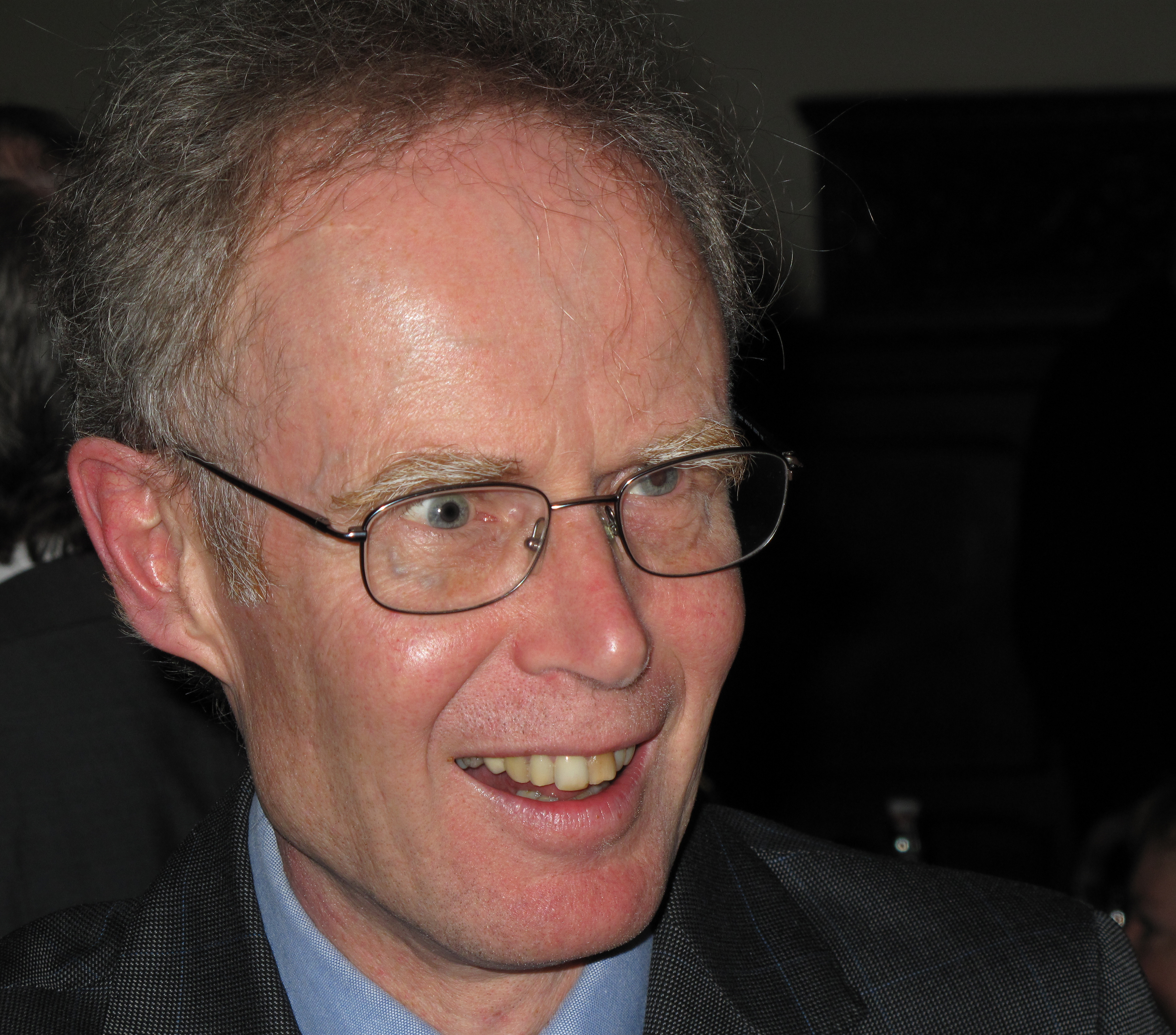
- John Bell, October 2009
- Scientific career
- Fields: Comparative law, jurisprudence, public law, European Law

John Bell is a British academic who is Emeritus Professor of Law (1973) at the University of Cambridge and a Fellow of Pembroke College, Cambridge. He served as General Editor of the Cambridge Law Journal from 2010 to 2019.

Prior to appointment to the Cambridge Chair in 2001, he was professor of law at the University of Leeds (1989–2001) and fellow and tutor in law at Wadham College, Oxford (1979–1989).

He is an honorary member of Hardwicke Chambers, and was ordained as a permanent deacon within the Catholic Church in July 2012.

== Academic interests ==
Bell's academic interests include comparative law, jurisprudence, public law, and European Law.

== Publications ==
- Bell, John (2006). Judiciaries within Europe. Cambridge, United Kingdom: Cambridge University Press. ISBN 978-0-521-86072-7.
- Bell, John (2001). French Legal Cultures. Cambridge, United Kingdom: Cambridge University Press. ISBN 978-0-521-60612-7.
- Bell, John; Boyron, S.; Whittaker, S. (2008). Principles of French Law (2nd ed.). Oxford, United Kingdom: Oxford University Press. ISBN 978-0-19-954139-3.
- Bell, John; Brown, L. N. (1998). French Administrative Law (5th ed.). Oxford, United Kingdom: Oxford University Press. ISBN 978-0-19-876513-4.
