= Suffield, Norfolk =

Village in Norfolk, England

Coordinates: 52.84578°N 1.30977°E

Suffield
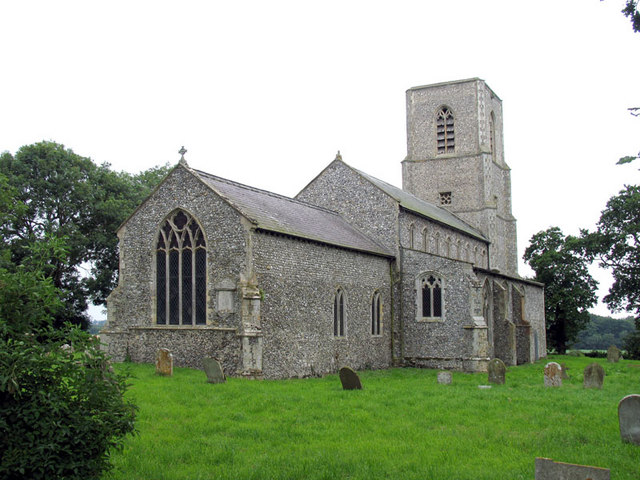
- St Margaret's parish church, Suffield.

- Location within Norfolk
- Area: 5.94 km^{2} (2.29 sq mi)
- Population: 129 (parish, 2011 census)
  - Density: 22/km^{2} (57/sq mi)
- OS grid reference: TG230330
  - London: 132 miles (212 km)
- Civil parish: Suffield
- District: North Norfolk
- Shire county: Norfolk
- Region: East
- Country: England
- Sovereign state: United Kingdom
- Post town: NORWICH
- Postcode district: NR11
- Dialling code: 01263
- Police: Norfolk
- Fire: Norfolk
- Ambulance: East of England
- UK Parliament: North Norfolk

Suffield is a village and a civil parish in the English county of Norfolk. The village is 7.1 miles (11.4 km) south of Cromer, 18.4 miles (29.6 km) north of Norwich and 132 miles (212 km) north of London. The village lies east of the A140 between Cromer and Norwich. The nearest railway station is at Gunton for the Bittern Line which runs between Sheringham, Cromer and Norwich. The nearest airport is Norwich International Airport.

Its parish church is St Margaret's.
