= Pelves, Pas-de-Calais =

Pelves
- Commune
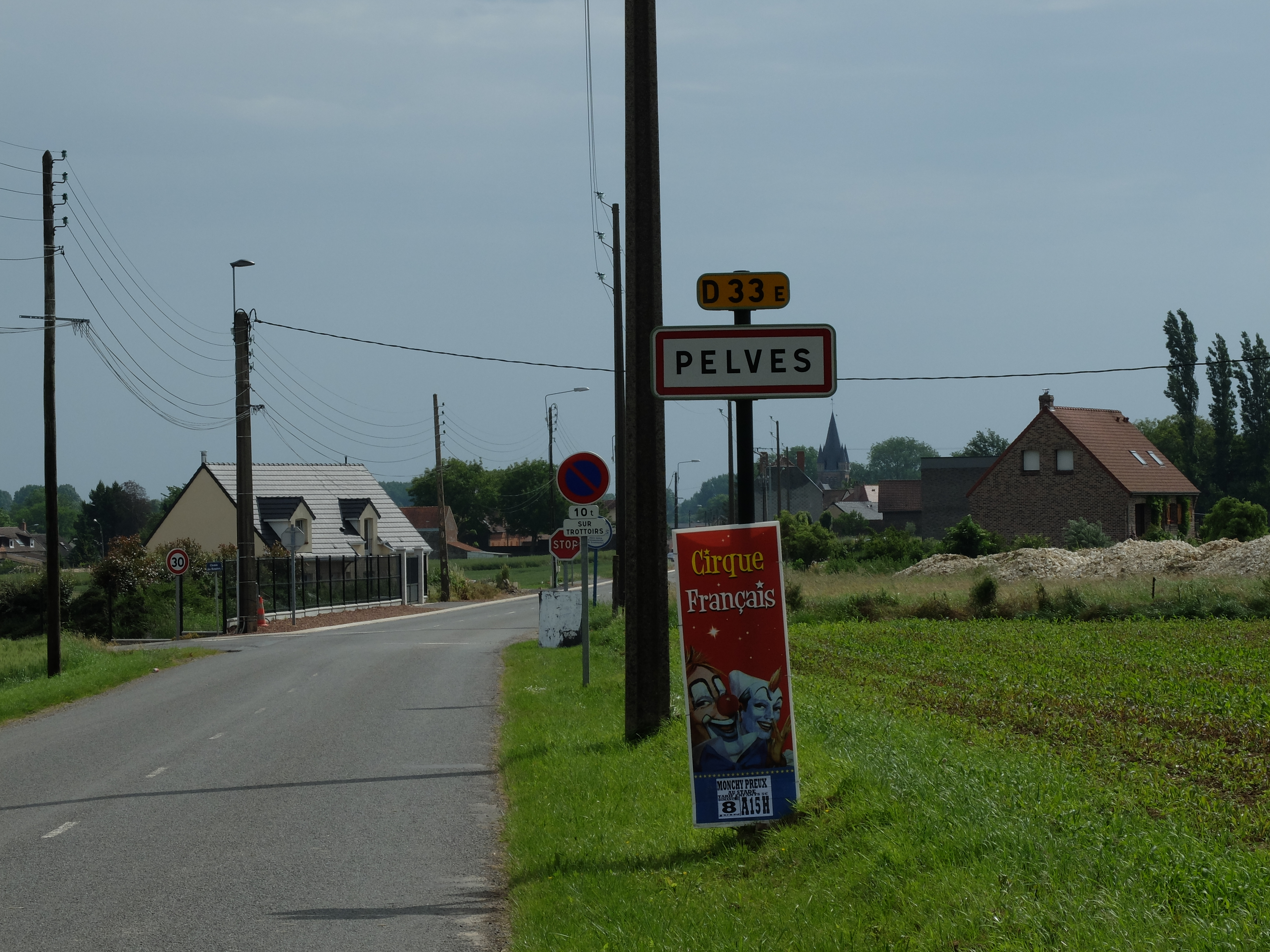
- The road into Pelves

- Coat of arms
- Location of Pelves
- Location within France Location within Hauts-de-France
- Coordinates: 50°17′29″N 2°54′54″E
- Country: France
- Region: Hauts-de-France
- Department: Pas-de-Calais
- Arrondissement: Arras
- Canton: Brebières
- Intercommunality: CC Osartis Marquion

Government
  - Mayor (2021–2026): André Bordas
- Area^{1}: 6.6 km^{2} (2.5 sq mi)
- Elevation: 48 m (157 ft)
- Highest elevation: 99 m (325 ft)
- Lowest elevation: 42 m (138 ft)
- Population (2023): 770
  - Density: 120/km^{2} (300/sq mi)
- Time zone: UTC+01:00 (CET)
  - Summer (DST): UTC+02:00 (CEST)
- INSEE/Postal code: 62650 /62118
- ^{1} French Land Register data, which excludes lakes, ponds, glaciers > 1 km^{2} (0.386 sq mi or 247 acres) and river estuaries.

Pelves (French pronunciation: [pɛlv]) is a commune in the Pas-de-Calais department in the Hauts-de-France region of France.

== Geography ==
Pelves is situated 6 miles (10 km) east of Arras, at the junction of the D33E and C4 roads, in the valley of the river Scarpe and just south of the junction of the A1 and the A26 autoroutes.

== Population ==
Historical population
Year	Pop.	±% p.a.
1968	573	—
1975	607	+0.83%
1982	653	+1.05%
1990	785	+2.33%
1999	716	−1.02%
2007	718	+0.03%
2012	717	−0.03%
2017	740	+0.63%
2023	770	+0.66%
Source: INSEE

== Places of interest ==
- The church of St.Vaast, rebuilt along with the entire village, after World War I.
- The Commonwealth War Graves Commission cemetery.

== See also ==
- Communes of the Pas-de-Calais department
