= Brian R. Cheffins =

British legal scholar

Professor Brian R. Cheffins FBA
- Born: Brian Robert Cheffins
- Occupation: Legal scholar
- Title: SJ Berwin Professor of Corporate Law

Academic background
- Education: University of Victoria; University of Cambridge

Academic work
- Sub-discipline: Company law Corporate governance Business history
- Website: https://www.law.cam.ac.uk/people/academic/br-cheffins/3

Brian Robert Cheffins, FBA is a Canadian legal academic. He has been since 1998 S.J. Berwin Professor of Corporate Law at the University of Cambridge and a fellow of Trinity Hall, Cambridge. Previously he was a professor at the University of British Columbia.

== Early life ==
He studied history at the University of Victoria, graduating with a B.A. in 1982. Cheffins went to law school at the University of Victoria, graduating with an LL.B. in 1984. He became a member of the Bar of British Columbia in 1985. Cheffins then studied at the University of Cambridge, graduating with an LL.M. in 1986.

== Academic career ==
In 1986 Cheffins was appointed as an assistant professor at the Faculty of Law at the University of British Columbia. He was promoted to associate professor in 1991 and professor in 1997.

Cheffins moved to the University of Cambridge in 1998 to become the S.J Berwin Professor of Corporate Law. That year he was elected as a fellow at Trinity Hall, Cambridge. Cheffins was a J.M. Keynes Fellow in financial economics from 2014 to 2018. He served as chair of University of Cambridge Law Faculty in 2018-19.

Cheffins has held a number of visiting academic appointments, including visiting professorships at Harvard Law School (2002) and Columbia Law School (2016) and the Thomas K. McCraw Fellowship in US Business History at Harvard Business School (2014).

== Honours ==
Cheffins was awarded a Guggenheim Fellowship in 2002. He was awarded a Leverhulme Trust Major Research Fellowship in 2015 that was tenable from 2016 to 2018.

In July 2018, Cheffins was elected a Fellow of the British Academy (FBA), the United Kingdom's national academy for the humanities and social sciences.

== Major works ==
- Cheffins, Brian R. (1997). Company Law: Theory, Structure and Operation. Oxford: Oxford University Press. ISBN 9780198764694.
- Cheffins, Brian R. (2008). Corporate Ownership and Control: British Business Transformed. Oxford: Oxford University Press. ISBN 9780199236978.
- Cheffins, Brian R. (2011). The History of Modern U.S. Corporate Governance. Cheltenham: Edward Elgar Publishing. ISBN 9781849807616.
- Cheffins, Brian R. (2018). The Public Company Transformed. Oxford: Oxford University Press. ISBN 9780190640323.
- Cheffins, Brian R. (2024). Advanced Introduction to Corporate Governance Law and Regulation. Edward Elgar Publishing. ISBN 9781035316335.
