= Cambridge Law Journal =

- Discipline: British law
- Language: English
- Edited by: Lionel Bently (Editor-in-Chief), John Allison (General Editor) and Louise Gullifer (General Editor)

Publication details
- History: 1921–present
- Publisher: Cambridge University Press
- Frequency: 3 times per year (March, July, November)
- Open access: hybrid

Standard abbreviations
- Bluebook: Cambridge L.J.
- ISO 4: Camb. Law J.

Indexing
- ISSN: 0008-1973
- JSTOR: camblawj
- OCLC no.: 02277447

Links
- Journal homepage

The Cambridge Law Journal is a peer-reviewed academic law journal, and the principal academic publication of the Faculty of Law, University of Cambridge. It is published by Cambridge University Press, and is the longest established university law journal in the United Kingdom. Based on the outcomes of the 2001 Research Assessment Exercise a 2006 analysis ranked the journal as overall the 7th most influential in the United Kingdom.

== History ==
The Cambridge Law Journal was founded in 1921 as a student publication by the Cambridge University Law Society, though there was a Faculty editor, initially Arthur Lehman Goodhart, a fellow at Corpus Christi. Subsequent editors included Sir Percy Winfield (1929-47) and Stanley Bailey. The Journal was initially published by Stevens & Sons Ltd.

In 1954, its management was taken over by the Faculty of Law, University of Cambridge, after which time it was published twice a year. The Journal described itself as published “Under the auspices of the Faculty of Law”. Goodhart would later explain that this was because there were not a sufficient number of students who were able to write case-notes of a suitable quality. The first editor was Stanley Bailey, who was succeeded by C.J. "Jack" Hamson, who carried on that role until 1973. In 1985, it was decided that the Journal should be published three times a year.

Michael Prichard took over the editorship from 1996 to 2002, when he was succeeded by David Ibbetson (2003–09) and then John Bell (legal scholar) (2010–19). In September 2021, a special issue was published the celebrate the centenary of the Journal.
