= Rouse Ball Professor of English Law =

Professorship at the University of Cambridge

- Incumbent; Louise Gullifer KC (Hon) from October 1, 2019
- Faculty of Law, University of Cambridge
- Style: Professor
- Type: Professorship
- Residence: University of Cambridge
- Appointer: The Board of Electors to the Rouse Ball Professorship of English Law
- Formation: October 1, 1927
- First holder: Sir Percy Winfield
- Salary: £70,004-£180,014

The Rouse Ball Professorship of English Law is a senior professorship in English law at the University of Cambridge, established in 1927 by a bequest from the mathematician W. W. Rouse Ball. In establishing the office, Rouse Ball expressed a hope "that it might be found practicable for such Professor or Reader to include in his or her lectures and treatment historical and philosophical aspects of the subject".

Its holders are chosen based on international recognition in their field of scholarship, having an outstanding record in research and publication, strategic vision and commitment to developing their field of scholarship within the University of Cambridge, and the Faculty of Law's profile within that field, and having a commitment to excellence in learning and teaching.

On 1 October 2019, Professor Louise Gullifer was appointed to the professorship, following the retirement of her predecessor David Feldman.

== Rouse Ball Professors of English Law ==
Name	From	To
Sir Percy Henry Winfield	1928	1942
Henry Arthur Hollond	1943	1949
Stanley John Bailey	1950	1967
Glanville Williams	1968	1977
Sir William Wade	1978	1983
Sir David Williams	1984	1992
Sir Jack Beatson	1993	2003
David Feldman	2004	2018
Louise Gullifer	2019	

== See also ==
- Rouse Ball Professor of Mathematics
- Downing Professor of the Laws of England
- Regius Professor of Civil Law (Cambridge)
