= Estoppel in English law =

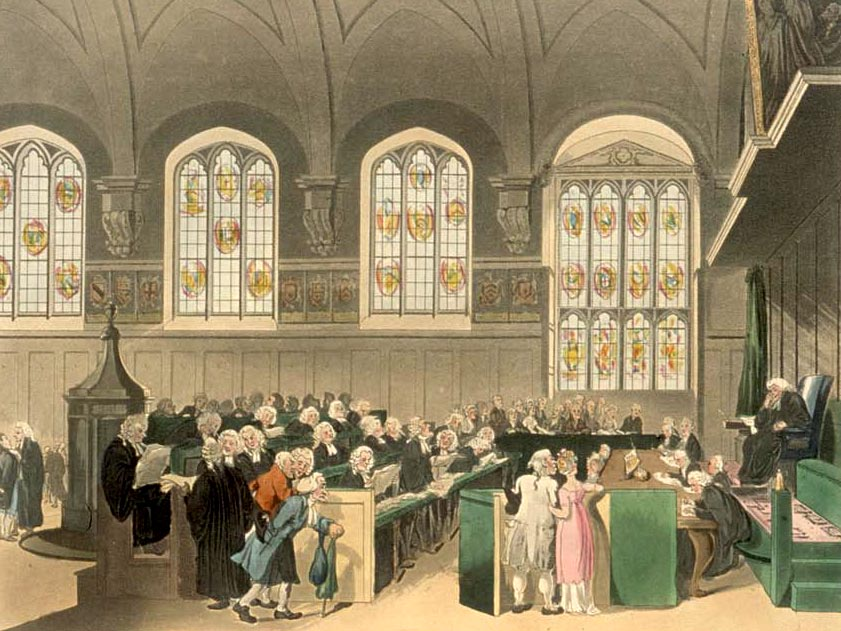
Estoppel forms part of the rules of equity, which were originally administered in the Chancery courts

Estoppel in English law is a doctrine that may be used in certain situations to prevent a person from relying upon certain rights, or upon a set of facts (e.g. words said or actions performed) which is different from an earlier set of facts.

Estoppel could arise in a situation where a creditor informs a debtor that a debt is forgiven, but then later insists upon repayment. In a case such as this, the creditor may be estopped from relying on their legal right to repayment, as the creditor has represented that he no longer treats the debt as extant. A landlord may tell his tenant that he is not required to pay rent for a period of time ("you don't need to pay rent until the war is over"). Until the war is over, the landlord would be "estopped" from claiming rents during the war period. Estoppel is often important in insurance law, where some actions by the insurer or the agent estop the insurer from denying a claim.

There are a huge array of different types of estoppel which can arise under English law. It has been judicially noted on more than one occasion that the link between them is often tenuous. Treitel on Contracts notes that "unconscionability ... provides the link between them", but they nevertheless have "separate requirements and different terrains of application". The English courts have generally abandoned any attempt to create a single general underlying rationale or principle; in First National Bank plc v Thompson [1996] Ch 231 CA Lord Millett said: "the attempt... to demonstrate that all estoppels... are now subsumed in the single and all-embracing estoppel by representation and that they are all governed by the same principle [has] never won general acceptance."

== Reliance-based estoppels ==
Under English law, estoppel by, promissory estoppel and proprietary estoppel are regarded as 'reliance-based estoppels' by Halsbury's Laws of England, Vol 16(2), 2003. Both Halsbury's and Spencer Bower (2004) describe all three estoppels collectively as estoppels by representation. These estoppels can be invoked when a promisee/representee wishes to enforce a promise/representation when no consideration was provided by him. The court will only enforce this lack-of-consideration promise if and only if it would be "unconscionable" for the promisor/representor to rescind from his promise/representation ("it's not fair!"). Estoppel when invoked in such a manner is often considered a rival or alternative to the doctrine of consideration under contract law. Only proprietary estoppel can create a cause of action in English law, though the other two can act in support of a cause of action or a reply to a defence. Under American jurisprudence, equitable estoppel is available only as a defence, while promissory estoppel can be used as the basis of a cause of action.

The requirements of inducement and reliance are broadly the same for all reliance-based estoppels:

- (i) the representor must have intended (actual or presumed) the represent, or have been reasonably understood by the represent as having intended him, to act on the relevant representation (or promise),
- (ii) the form of reliance must have been reasonable or intended, and
- (iii) the representation must have caused the represent to act in such a way that it would be "unconscionable" for the representor to resile. Detriment is measured at the time when the promisor proposes to withdraw his promise, not at the time when the promise is made.

Estoppel by representation of fact and promissory estoppel are mutually exclusive: the former is based on representation of existing fact (or of mixed fact and law), while the latter is based on a promise not to enforce some pre-existing right (i.e., an intention as to the future). Proprietary estoppel can operate only between parties who, at the time of representation, were in a pre-existing relationship, while this is not a pre-requisite under estoppel by representation of fact.

English courts will consider unconscionability taking into account many factors, including the behaviour, state of mind, and circumstances of the parties. Generally, the following eight factors are determinative:

- how the promise/representation and reliance upon it were induced
- the content of the promise/representation
- relative knowledge of the parties
- parties' relative interest in the relevant activities in reliance
- nature and context of the parties' relationship
- parties' relative strength of position
- history of the parties' relationship
- steps, if any, taken by the promisor/representor to ensure he has not caused preventible harm.

=== Estoppel by representation ===
"Estoppel by representation of fact" is a term coined by George Spencer Bower. This species of estoppel is also referred to as "common law estoppel by representation" in Halsbury's Laws of England, vol 16(2), 2003 reissue.

In Spencer Bower (2004) at paragraph I.2.2, estoppel by representation of fact is defined as follows:

where one person (‘the representor’) has made a representation of fact to another person (‘the representee’) in words or by acts or conduct, or (being under a duty to the representee to speak or act) by silence or inaction, with the intention (actual or presumptive) and with the result of inducing the representee on the faith of such representation to alter his position to his detriment, the representor, in any litigation which may afterwards take place between him and the representee, is estopped, as against the representee, from making, or attempting to establish by evidence, any averment substantially at variance with his former representation, if the representee at the proper time, and in proper manner, objects thereto.

A second definition can be found at Wilken & Villiers (2002) at paragraph 9.02:

An estoppel by representation [of fact] will arise between A and B if the following elements are made out. First, A makes a false representation of fact to B or to a group of which B was a member. [It is not necessary to demonstrate A knew that the representation was untrue.] Second, in making the representation, A intended or [in the alternatively,] knew that it was likely to be acted upon. Third, B, believing the representation, acts to its detriment in reliance on the representation. [It must have been reasonable to rely on the representation.] Fourth, A subsequently seeks to deny the truth of the representation. Fifth, no defence to the estoppel can be raised by A.

A representation can be made by statement or conduct. Although the representation must be clear and unambiguous, a representation can be inferred from silence where there is a duty to speak or from negligence where a duty of care arises. Under English law, estoppel by representation of fact is not a cause of action, though it may be a defence or acts in support of a cause of action. There is some debate whether under English law courts will take into account unconscionability under estoppel by representation of fact, although Australian courts clearly do.

Lord Justice Lewison, in his judgment as to the circumstances obtaining at the time of the withdrawal of employment tribunal (ET) proceedings did not draw the conclusion that the appellant, Dr Srivatsa, intended to concede the merits of his claim when withdrawing his ET action. In allowing the appeal of Dr Srivatsa against a prior judgement of a cause of action or issue estoppel, and in respectful disagreement with the judge of first instance, he said that the effect of that judge's decision was that, in the words of Mummery LJ in the case of Sajid v Sussex Muslim Society:

by a neat, technical swipe the [Defendants] would have eliminated a substantial claim without any tribunal or court having heard any evidence or argument about it. That seems to be a decision to which this court is not driven by any principle of cause of action estoppel.

=== Equitable estoppel ===
As noted above, under English law, promissory and proprietary estoppel are both species of equitable estoppel.

==== Proprietary estoppel ====
Proprietary estoppel arises when A purports to give but fails to effectively convey, or promises to give property or an interest in property, to B, while being generally aware (Crabb v Arun District Council) that B will expend money or otherwise act to his detriment in reliance of the supposed or promised gift, so much so that it would be "unconscionable" not to enforce the expectation (Taylor Fashions v Liverpool Victoria Trustees).

For example, in Dillwyn v Llewelyn in Chancery, a father promised a property to his son, who took possession, expended a large sum of money on the house and otherwise improved the property. The father never actually gifted the property to the son. After his death the son, claiming to be the equitable owner, obtained a court judgment forcing the trustees to convey the land to him.

Similarly in Inwards v Baker, a father encouraged his son to build a house on his own land, promising to leave that land to the son in his will. Subsequently, the son built a house and lived there for some 30 years. No transfer of land was made in the father's will when he died. It was held that despite this the personal representatives of the father were estopped from evicting the son.

While the courts will generally uphold the expectations of parties, if the parties are themselves not clear about their expectations the court's starting point will be the detriment incurred by the parties (per Robert Walker LJ Jennings v Rice). Proprietary estoppel claims, therefore do not necessarily result in the transfer of the property to the claimant; in Jennings v Rice itself, there was a monetary award.

In June 2008 the House of Lords re-visited the doctrine of proprietary estoppel, and in the process was quite fierce in describing its limits. In that light, it must be very doubtful that Mr Jennings would have got the result he did: properly understood, Jennings v Rice is a bit of a muddle, probably concerning promissory estoppel, with a bit of quantum meruit thrown in for good measure.

In Cobbe v Yeoman's Row Management Ltd the House overturned the decision of a fairly heavy-weight Court of Appeal on the very issue of estoppel, thereby illustrating the level of confusion about the meaning of the doctrine. Lord Scott of Foscote, with whom the other Lords agreed, described at length that someone who seeks to rely on proprietary estoppel must establish an actual or certain interest in the property to which he claimed a right. Without that, he is not off the starting blocks.

In particular he remarked that the following rationes of Deane J in the Australian case of Muschinski v Dodds "repay careful reading" (his Lordship said they applied to proprietary estoppel as they do to constructive trusts):

The fact that the constructive trust remains predominantly remedial does not, however, mean that it represents a medium for the indulgence of idiosyncratic notions of fairness and justice. As an equitable remedy, it is available only when warranted by established equitable principles or by the legitimate processes of legal reasoning, by analogy, induction and deduction, starting from the conceptual foundations of such principles... Under the law of the land... proprietary rights fall to be governed by principles of law and not by some mix of judicial discretion, subjective views about which party 'ought to win'... and the 'formless void' of individual moral opinion.

Lord Scott added:

A finding of proprietary estoppel, based on the unconscionability of the behaviour of the person against whom the finding was made but without any coherent formulation of the content of the estoppel or of the proprietary interest that the estoppel was designed to protect invites, in my opinion, criticism of the sort directed by Deane J in the passage cited...

He then found that that was exactly what the Court of Appeal, no less, had done. Once the proprietary right is established, then and only then will the court consider the conduct of the party seeking to deny the right and if that conduct is wanting, will estop him from denying the right. The court should not begin with an examination of a party's behaviour.

==== Promissory estoppel (contract law) ====
Promissory estoppel is the doctrine that prevents a party from acting in a certain way because the first party promised not to, and the second party relied on that promise and acted upon it. In English law, a promise made without consideration is generally not enforceable, and is known as a gratuitous promise. For example, a car salesman promises not to sell a car over the weekend, but does so, the promise cannot be enforced. If however, the car salesman accepts one pound in consideration for the promise, the promise is binding and enforceable in court. Estoppel is one of the exceptions to this rule.

The doctrine of promissory estoppel was first developed in Hughes v Metropolitan Railway Co but was lost for some time until it was resurrected by Lord Denning in the leading case of Central London Property Trust Ltd v High Trees House Ltd.

In this case, the claimants let a block of flats to the defendants at an annual rent of £2,500. However, they agreed to accept a reduction in rent to £1,250, because the defendants were unable to find enough tenants due to the evacuation of London during World War II. This promise to accept a lesser rent was unsupported by consideration. At the end of the war the flats became fully let, and the claimants demanded the return to payment of full rent. Denning J held that they were entitled to this from the last two quarters of 1945. Denning mentioned in an obiter dictum that had the plaintiffs tried to be reimbursed for the full amount they would have been estopped from doing so even though no consideration was present. This is because the plaintiff represented that he would accept half the rent and the defendant acted upon this.

Promissory estoppel requires (1) an unequivocal promise by words or conduct, (2) a change in position of the promisee as a result of the promise (not necessarily to their detriment), (3) inequity if the promisor were to go back on the promise. Estoppel is "a shield not a sword" – it cannot be used as the basis of an action on its own. It also does not extinguish rights. In High Trees the plaintiff company was able to restore payment of full rent (although estopped back rent was lost) from early 1945, but would have been able to restore full rent at any time after the initial promise provided a suitable period of notice had been given.

Estoppel is an equitable (as opposed to common law) construct and is therefore discretionary. In the case of D & C Builders Ltd v Rees the courts refused to recognise a promise to accept a part payment of £300 on a debt of £482 on the basis that it was extracted by duress. In Combe v Combe, Denning elaborated on the equitable nature of estoppel by refusing to allow its use as a "sword" by an ex-wife to extract funds from the destitute husband.

Promissory estoppel is not available when one party promises to accept a lesser sum in full payment of a debt, unless the debtor offers payment at an earlier date than was previously agreed. This is the rule formulated in Pinnel's Case, and affirmed in Foakes v Beer. This rule has, however, been thrown into doubt by the 2007 decision of Collier v Wright Ltd.

Note that promissory estoppel should not be confused with estoppel for non-disclosure of knowledge, colloquially known as nolissory estoppel. This arises when a party to a contract indicates that they have some knowledge about the value or the potential success/failure of a contract to the other party, but refuses to share this knowledge or 'nol'. The party with the 'nol' is estopped from their non-disclosure and is forced to impart it equitably.

Yet proprietary estoppel has also arisen by acquiescence. The leading case in this area is Ramadan v Dyson.

=== Estoppel by acquiescence ===
A legally binding contract occurs when one party makes an offer and receives an acceptance from the other party. A contract must consist of an offer and acceptance, the intention to create legal relations and consideration all must be present to make the contract legally enforceable. In contract law consideration is concerned with the bargain of the contract, each party to a contract must be both a promisor and a promisee. They must each receive a benefit and each suffers a detriment. The classic definition of consideration was given by the court in the case of Currie v Misa, referred to consideration as consisting of a detriment to the promisee or a benefit to the promisor, Lush J: “A valuable consideration, in the sense of the law, may consist either in some right, interest, profit or benefit accruing to one party, or some forbearance, detriment, loss or responsibility given, suffered or undertaken by the other".

The doctrine of consideration can therefore be seen as a set of rules, which play the principal role in the decision by the courts as to which agreements or promises are found to be legally binding.

Promissory estoppel is a term used in contract law that applies where there may not otherwise be an enforceable contract. The importance of promissory estoppel in contract law is that it has enabled legal obligations, which fall into the category of contract law but fail to show any consideration, to be argued for. Promissory estoppel provides a way in which promises can be legally binding even if no consideration has been given. Promissory estoppel relates to a form of future conduct. The doctrine of promissory estoppel may not make the total contract fully enforceable. The specific facts in the case must actually establish the elements of promissory estoppel before the contract becomes enforceable in law.

The promises within a contract will be enforced under the promissory estoppel doctrine, when enforcing the contract promises avoids injustice.

Lord Justice Denning is a leading figure in the field of promissory estoppel. The case of Central London Property Trust Ltd v High Trees House Ltd was concerned with the modification of the rent payable on a block of flats during the Second World War. The importance of the case, however, lies in an obiter statement of principle which Denning LJ set out, “a promise intended to be binding, intended to be acted on, and in fact acted on, is binding so far as its terms properly apply”. Applying this principle, Denning held that a promise to accept a lower rent during the war years was binding on the landlord, regardless of the fact that the tenant had supplied no consideration for it.

There are limitations which must be satisfied to this doctrine which derived from both Lord Cairns in the case Hughes v Metropolitan Railway Co and Denning LJ in the High Trees case. They are:

1. There must be a promise
2. There must be a clear promise intended to alter the contracted obligation. The court assesses intention objectively rather than taking evidence on the party's state of mind.

Woodhouse Israel Cocoa Ltd v Nigerian Produce Marketing Board held that a contract for the sale of some coffee beans was agreed to be payable in sterling. The sellers mistakenly sent an invoice stating price was payable in Nigerian pounds. At the time the value of sterling and the Nigerian pound was equal. The buyers accepted the delivery and invoice without objection. Subsequently, the value of sterling fell quite dramatically in relation to the Nigerian pound. The buyers then sought to revert to sterling as stated in the contract. The buyers conduct in accepting the invoice unquestionably amounted to an implied clear and unambiguous promise to accept on those terms.

==== The doctrine can only be used as a ‘shield not a sword’ ====
The full force application of the equitable maxim that estoppel only allows a litigant to "use it as a shield and not as a sword" restricts the application of this doctrine to as far as only to provide a defence to a party and not to be used as a cause of action against another. In Combe v Combe, CA a husband promised to make maintenance payments to his separated wife but failed to do so. The wife brought an action to enforce the promise invoking promissory estoppel. The court held that promissory estoppel does not create a cause of action and as such the requirement of consideration in formation of contract is still relevant. Promissory estoppel is a rule of evidence that prevents the promisor from denying the truth of statement on which the promisee had relied. Denning LJ said: "The principle does not create new causes of action where none existed before. It only prevents a party from insisting on his strict legal rights when it would be unjust to allow him to enforce them". However, this requirement seemed changed in light of the decisions in Evenden v Guildford City AFC, here the courts held "that promissory estoppel can be a cause of action."

Early cases indicated that there had to be a clear and unequivocal undertaking. However, this was overruled in Secretary of State for Employment v Globe Elastic Thread Co Ltd. The promise or representation must be “precise” and “unambiguous” although it does not mean that such promise or representation must be expressly made. The concept of ‘waiver’ has been recognised by both the common law and equity as a means by which certain rights can be suspended, but then revived by appropriate notice.

In Hughes v Metropolitan Railway Co, It can be seen that this case did not involve a "promise" as such, but merely an "understanding". It had been suggested that Hughes could be restricted to "relief against forfeiture" cases, but this was specifically rejected in the later cases. This case was the one on which Denning placed considerable reliance in the High Trees case. It never applied to situations of part payment of debts, however, under modern law the concept of waiver has been effectively considered within "promissory estoppel".

==== Contractual / legal relationship ====
It remains unsettled whether promissory estoppel may arise in pre-contractual relationships. In the case Brikom Investments Ltd v Carr, a landlord made an oral promise to his tenants that if they bought a 99-year lease to their flats he would repair the roofs of the flats at his own expense. After the leases had been signed by the tenants, the landlord repaired the roof at a cost of £15,000. The landlord then claimed a contribution from the tenants towards the cost of the repairs. The tenants refused to pay because of the promise made. The landlord claimed that Carr could not rely on her promise since she had not acted on his promise because she would have entered into the lease without any such promise having been made. However, Lord Denning was of the view that promissory estoppel may arise from promise made by parties negotiating contracts. Similar views was expressed in Durham Fancy Goods v Michael Jackson, where Donaldson J held that contractual relationship is irrelevant provided that there is “a pre-existing legal relationship which could, in certain circumstances, give rise to liabilities and penalties”.

==== Detrimental reliance on the representation ====
The proof of possible detriment or prejudice, which will appear if the promisor is allowed to revert to his original promise, is required. In Ajayi v Briscoe (1964), the Privy Council ruled that there was no estoppel where the promisee alters his position as a result of relying on the promise yet suffers no overall detriment. In Alan Co. Ltd v El Nasr & Import Co., Denning maintained that detriment is not an essential element of promissory estoppel. Therefore, for a plea of promissory estoppel to succeed, there must be a change in the circumstances of the promisee. This elementary composition of promissory estoppel has been the core and central topic of discussion in the evolution of the doctrine.

==== Temporary suspension of contractual obligations and rights ====
This doctrine does not operate to completely extinguish the original rights of the parties accruing from the contract. It only provides for the suspension of such right, which can subsequently be revived after a certain event or time. In Tool Metal Manufacturing v Tungsten, The courts held that generally promissory estoppel will merely suspend legal rights rather than extinguish them. However, where periodic payments are involved and a promise has been made to reduce the payments because of pressing circumstances which are not likely to persist, promissory estoppel can be used to extinguish legal rights. This final limitation to the scope of estoppel operates in the sense that the doctrine applies to representations relating to past and present events only by excluding the future events executory promise. However, promissory estoppel may permanently extinguish the rights of the promisor to claim lump sum after part-payment. In D & C Builders Ltd v Rees, Lord Denning expressed that the:

Promisor would not be allowed to revert to his strict legal rights and that the promissory estoppel will be final if promisee understood the promise to mean final extinguishing of promisor's strict legal rights

To conclude, the above limitations help to clearly outline its parameters. This essay has defined with the use of cases to demonstrate the successful attempts to depart from the traditional approach set by the Hughes and the High Trees cases. The parameters of this doctrine seem presently not to be clearly defined. These consequences have caused the parameters of promissory estoppel to be no longer an established and well-settled area, which may interpret a huge problem to the development of contract law. The threats to the limitations of promissory estoppel, manifested from the continuing evolution of promissory estoppel, may pose turbulence in contract law and open the flood gate to litigation. Therefore, the application of the modern promissory estoppel replaces the traditional limitations set in the landmark cases. This equitable doctrine which originally acts as an exception to the doctrine of accord and satisfaction with subject to limitations now appears as an open and unlimited doctrine.

== Other estoppels ==
=== Contractual estoppel ===
The law relating to contractual estoppel was summarised in Peekay Intermark Ltd v Australia and New Zealand Banking Group Ltd:

There is no reason in principle why parties to a contract should not agree that a certain state of affairs should form the basis for the transaction, whether it be the case or not. For example, it may be desirable to settle a disagreement as to an existing state of affairs in order to establish a clear basis for the contract itself and its subsequent performance. Where parties express an agreement of that kind in a contractual document neither can subsequently deny the existence of the facts and matters upon which they have agreed, at least so far as concerns those aspects of their relationship to which the agreement was directed. The contract itself gives rise to an estoppel: ...

=== Issue estoppel ===
The civil law use of issue estoppel or res judicata (literally translated as "the fact has been decided") is relatively uncontroversial. It expresses a general public interest that the same issue should not be litigated more than once even when the parties are different. The criminal law application, called double jeopardy provides that a person should not be tried twice for the same offence. A notable case occurred in relation to the Birmingham Six where the House of Lords ruled in Hunter v Chief Constable of the West Midlands Police that issue estoppel applied when the Six sued West Midlands Police for damages for assault. However, in their earlier criminal trial they had claimed to have been assaulted to gain confessions, and that court had rejected the allegation of assault. Lord Diplock said:

The inherent power which any court of justice must possess to prevent misuse of its procedure in a way which, although not inconsistent with the literal application of its procedural rules, would nevertheless be manifestly unfair to a party to litigation before it, or would otherwise bring the administration of justice into disrepute among right-thinking people.

=== Other estoppels ===
- Estoppel in pais (literally “by act of notoriety", or "solemn formal act”) is the historical root of common law estoppel by representation and equitable estoppel. Estoppel in pais and equitable estoppel are used interchangeably in American legal parlance.
- Estoppel by convention as understood in English law (also known as estoppel by agreement) occurs where two parties negotiates or operates a contract based on a shared assumption or mutual understanding of a legal effect (or interpretation) of that contract, they are bound by that belief, assumption or understanding if (i) they both knew the other operated under the same, and (ii) they both regulated their subsequent dealings on the same. It has been said that estoppel by convention is not truly an estoppel but merely an instance of estoppel by representation, promissory estoppel or proprietary estoppel, though the first of the three is its most frequent manifestation.
- Estoppel by deed is a rule of evidence. A statement in a deed, usually facts stated in the recital of a deed, is evidentially conclusive against the parties of the deed. The parties are estopped from asserting otherwise.

== See also ==
- Consideration in English law

== Bibliography ==
- Halsbury's Laws of England Cumulative Supplement. Vol. 16. 2003.
- Spencer Bower, George (2004). The Law relating to Estoppel by Representation (4th ed.). LexisNexis. ISBN 978-0-406-04361-0.
- Spence, Michael (1999). Protecting Reliance: The Emergent Doctrine of Equitable Estoppel. Oxford. pp. 60–66.
- Wilken, Sean; Villiers, Theresa (2002). The Law of Waiver, Variation and Estoppel (2nd ed.). Oxford University Press. ISBN 978-0-19-925321-0.
