= Consideration in English law =

Something of value promised by parties to a contract to each other

Consideration is an English common law concept within the law of contract, and is a necessity for simple contracts (but not for special contracts by deed). The concept of consideration has been adopted by other common law jurisdictions, including in the United States.

Consideration can be anything of value (such as any goods, money, services, or promises of any of these), which each party gives as a quid pro quo to support their side of the bargain. Mutual promises constitute consideration for each other. (Note: e.g. I promise you that I will do X, in consideration for which you promise me that you will do Y".) If only one party offers consideration, the agreement is a "bare promise" and is unenforceable.

== Value ==
According to Currie v Misa, consideration for a particular promise exists where some right, interest, profit or benefit accrues (or will accrue) to the promisor as a direct result of some forbearance, detriment, loss or responsibility that has been given, suffered or undertaken by the promisee. Forbearance to act amounts to consideration only if one is thereby surrendering a legal right.

"Past consideration is no consideration": consideration must be "executory" or "executed", but not "past"; that is, consideration must be supplied in the present or in the future, but things done beforehand cannot be good consideration.

- ex nudo pacto actio non oritur
- Dyer's case (1414) 2 Hen. 5, 5 Pl. 26
- Lucy v Walwyn was an early case on the doctrine of consideration, concerning an executory contract where the plaintiff recovered damages for the loss of a bargain.
- Thomas v Thomas. was a case where £1 was seen to be good consideration for a widow to continue to live in her house after her husband's death.
- White v Bluett: Bluett, when sued by his father's executors for an outstanding debt to his father, claimed that his father had promised to discharge him from it in return for him stopping complaining about property distribution. The Court held that the cessation of complaints was of no economic value; thus, Bluett's father had received no real consideration for the promise, and the debt was enforceable at law.
- Currie v Misa Lush J. referred to consideration as consisting of a detriment to the promisee or a benefit to the promisor: "... some right, interest, profit or benefit accruing to one party, or some forbearance, detriment, loss or responsibility given, suffered or undertaken by the other."
- Bolton v Madden Blackburn J, "The general rule is that an executory agreement, by which the plaintiff agrees to do something on the terms that the defendant agrees to do something else, may be enforced if what the plaintiff has agreed to do is either for the benefit of the defendant or to the trouble or prejudice of the plaintiff."
- Dunlop Pneumatic Tyre Co Ltd v Selfridge & Co Ltd: Lord Dunedin quotes the definition of Sir Frederick Pollock, "An act or forbearance of one party, or the promise thereof, is the price for which the promise of the other is bought and the promise thus given for value is enforceable."

== Adequacy ==
Consideration must have some value, even if it is only slight value, in order to be good consideration. It is not necessary for the consideration to be equivalent to the initial promise in terms of value. Nominal consideration will suffice as good consideration for a contract, Courts will not measure the adequacy of the consideration as it is up to the parties to decide the subjective worth of each promise.

In the British House of Lords case Chappell & Co Ltd v Nestle Co Ltd (1959), Lord Somervell said: "A contracting party can stipulate for what consideration he chooses. A peppercorn does not cease to be good consideration if it is established that the promisor does not like pepper and will throw away the corn."

== Past conduct ==
A promise cannot be based upon consideration that was said, given or done before the promise was performed. Something said afterwards, will not count as consideration. For example, if X promises to reward Y for an act that Y had already performed then while the performance of that act is good consideration, for the promise to be rewarded for it is past consideration and therefore not good consideration.

In Eastwood v Kenyon the guardian of a young girl raised a loan to educate the girl and to improve her marriage prospects. After her marriage, her husband promised to pay off the loan. It was held that the guardian could not enforce the promise as taking out the loan to raise and educate the girl was past consideration, because it was completed before the husband promised to repay it.

Furthermore, where a contract exists between two parties and one party, subsequent to formation, promises to confer an additional benefit on the other party to the contract, that promise is not binding because the promisee's consideration, which is his entry into the original contract, had already been completed (or "used") at the time the next promise is made.

In Roscorla v Thomas, Roscorla had contracted to buy a horse from Thomas for £30. After the sale, Thomas promised Roscorla that the horse was sound; the horse turned out to be vicious. It was held that Roscorla could not enforce the promise, as the consideration given for entering into the contract to buy the horse had been completed by the time the promise was made; in a sense, the consideration was "used up".

The rule that past consideration is not good consideration is subject to the exception discussed by the Privy Council in Pao On v Lau Yiu Long. In that case, their Lordships held that past consideration can be good consideration where:

1. The promisee performed the original act at the request of the promisor;
2. It was clearly understood or implied between the parties that the promisee would be rewarded for the performance of the act;
3. The actual promise made, if made before the promisee provided the consideration, must be capable of being enforced, in other words giving rise to a legally binding contract.

== Illusory consideration ==
There must be some kind of connection between a promise and the consideration offered to support the promise. It is no consideration to "refrain from a course of conduct which it was never intended to pursue". The consideration must have been at least an inducement to enter into the promise.

=== Forbearing to sue ===
- Callisher v Bischoffsheim, forbearance to sue in a groundless action still good consideration; honest mistake.

== Privity ==
A promise is enforceable if it is supported by consideration, that is, where consideration has moved from the promisee. For example, in the case of Tweddle v Atkinson, John Tweddle promised William Guy that he would pay a sum of money to the child of William Guy, and likewise William Guy promised John Tweddle that he would pay a sum of money to the child of John Tweddle, upon the marriage of the two children to each other. However, William Guy failed to pay the son of John Tweddle, who then sued his executors for the amount promised. It was held that the son could not enforce the promise made to his father, as he himself had not actually given consideration for it - it was his father who had done so instead. The son didn't receive any consideration, so he cannot enforce the promise. This particular rule of consideration forms the basis of the doctrine of privity of a contract, that is, only a party to a contract is permitted to sue upon that contract's terms. (Note that the doctrine of privity has been somewhat altered by the Contracts (Rights of Third Parties) Act 1999.) Therefore, consideration from the promisee was indulgent of the claim. Although consideration must move from the promisee, it does not necessarily have to move to the promisor. The promisee may provide consideration to a third party, if this is agreed at the time the parties contracted.

The offeree must provide consideration, although the consideration does not have to flow to the offeror. For example, it is good consideration for person A to pay person C in return for services rendered by person B. If there are joint promisees, then consideration need only to move from one of the promisees.

== Pre-existing duties ==
If the promisee provides what he was required by public law to do in any event in return for a promise, promised performance of existing duty is not good consideration. In Collins v Godefrey Godefrey promised to pay Collins for his giving of evidence. It was held that Collins could not enforce the promise as he was under a statutory duty to give evidence in any event.

However, if the promisee provides more than what public duty imposes on him, then this is good consideration. In Ward v Byham a mother was under a statutory duty to look after her child. The ex-husband promised to pay her £1 a week if she ensured that the child was well looked after and happy. It was held that notwithstanding the statutory duty imposed on the mother, she could enforce the promise since the act of keeping the baby 'happy' provided additional consideration.

Promising to perform a pre-existing duty owed to one's contracting party also fails to make good consideration. However this rule has been considerably narrowed by recent case law. The general rule is that if a creditor promises to discharge a debt in return for a fraction of payment, in paying the agreed fraction, the promisee is not providing consideration for the promise, as this is merely part performance of a contractual duty already owed. (Note: Pinnel's Case was confirmed by Foakes v Beer) Consequently, the debtor is still liable for the whole amount, as he cannot force the promisor to accept less. A leading example is in Stilk v Myrick where Stilk, a seaman, agreed with Myrick to sail his boat to the Baltic Sea and back for £5 per month. During the voyage, two men deserted. Myrick promised he would increase Stilk's wages if Stilk agreed to honour his contract in light of the desertions. Stilk agreed and on return to port, Myrick refused to pay him the extra wages. It was held that Myrick's fresh promise was not enforceable as the consideration Stilk had provided for it, the performance of a duty he already owed to Myrick under contract, was not good consideration for Myrick's promise to increase his wages.

Initially, there were only two exceptions to this rule:

- Hanson v Royden, the promisee has done, or has promised to do, more than he was obliged to do under his contract.
- Hartley v Ponsonby before the fresh promise was made, circumstances had arisen which would have entitled the promisee to refuse to carry out his obligations under his contract.

=== Factual benefits ===
However, the strictness of this rule was severely limited in Williams v Roffey Bros & Nicholls (Contractors) Ltd. The Roffey Brothers entered into a contract to refurbish a block of flats for a fixed price of £20,000. They sub-contracted carpentry work to Williams. It became apparent that Williams was threatened by financial difficulties and would not be able to complete his work on time. This would have breached a term in the main contract, incurring a penalty. Roffey Brothers offered to pay Williams an additional £575 for each flat completed. Williams continued to work on this basis, but soon it became apparent that Roffey Brothers were not going to pay the additional money. He ceased work and sued Roffey Brothers for the extra money, for the eight flats he had completed after the promise of additional payment. The Court of Appeal held that Roffey Brothers must pay Williams the extra money, as they had enjoyed practical benefits from the promise they had made to Williams. The benefits they received from it include: Having the work completed on time, not having to spend money and time seeking another carpenter and not having to pay the penalty. In the circumstances, these benefits were sufficient to provide consideration for the promise made to Williams of additional payment. It now seems that the performance of an existing duty may constitute consideration for a new promise, in the circumstances where no duress or fraud are found and where the practical benefits are to the promisor. The performance of an existing contractual duty owed to the promisor is not good consideration for a fresh promise given by the promisor. However, performance of an existing contractual duty owed to a third party can be good consideration, see further below.

According to the Court of Appeal, it is unlikely that either avoiding a breach of contract with a third party, avoiding the trouble and expense of engaging a third party to carry out work or avoiding a penalty clause in a third party contract will be a "practical benefit". In Simon Container Machinery Ltd v Emba Machinery AB, the practical benefit was held to be the avoiding of a breach of contract, which was clearly not an extension of the principle.

This is true unless the debtor provided fresh consideration for the promise. The following, mentioned in Pinnel's Case, and confirmed by Sibree v. Tripp, may amount to fresh consideration:

1. If the promisee offers part payment earlier than full payment was due, and this is of benefit to the creditor;
2. If the promisee offers part payment at a different place than where full payment was due, and this is of benefit to the creditor; or,
3. If the promisee pays the debt in part by another chattel (note, however, that part payment by cheque, where full payment was due by another means, is not consideration.)

Another exception is that part payment of the debt by a third party as consideration for a promise to discharge the creditor from the full sum, prevents the creditor then suing the debtor for full payment (see Welby v Drake).

The Court of Appeal, in Re Selectmove Ltd, stated that the practical benefit doctrine, arising from Williams v Roffey, cannot be used as an additional exception to the rule. In that case, it was held that the doctrine only applies where the original promise was a promise to pay extra and not to pay less. The Court of Appeal in Re Selectmove were unable to distinguish Foakes v Beer (a House of Lords decision), in order to apply Williams v Roffey (a Court of Appeal decision). It therefore remains to be seen whether the House of Lords would decide this point differently. In any event, the equitable principle of promissory estoppel may provide the debtor with relief.

The Court of Appeal in June 2016 in MWB v Rock Advertising revisited the issue of whether the practical benefit doctrine could be applied to decreasing pacts or agreements to accept less. Arden LJ and Kitchin LJ both endorsed this approach indicating that part payment along with practical benefit could be enough to support a promise to accept less. The decision has been criticised as extending the practical benefit test beyond its limits.

=== Existing duties to third parties ===
Consideration for a promise can be the performance of a contractual duty owed to someone other than the promisor. In Shadwell v Shadwell, Cayley Shadwell was under a contractual duty with a third party to marry. His uncle, Charles Shadwell promised to pay him £150 per year after he was married. It was held that Cayley Shadwell marrying was good consideration, notwithstanding that he was obliged by a contract with a third party to marry in any event.

A promise to perform a pre-existing contractual duty owed to a third party (as opposed to the performance of that duty) may also amount to consideration.

- NZ Shipping Co Ltd v A M Satterthwaite & Co Ltd.

== Estoppel ==
- Central London Property Trust Ltd v High Trees House Ltd.
- Hughes v Metropolitan Rly Co.
- D & C Builders v Rees.
- Ogilvy v Hope Davies.
- Combe v Combe.
- Re Selectmove Ltd.
- Collier v P&MJ Wright (Holdings) Ltd.
- Waltons Stores (Interstate Ltd) v Maher.
- Crabb v Arun District Council.
- Avon County Council v Howlett a person can be estopped from denying what he said in a representation.

== Deeds and formality ==
- Law of Property (Miscellaneous Provisions) Act 1989 (UK) section 1

== Alternatives ==
- Carlill v Carbolic Smoke Ball Co AL Smith LJ, I understand that if there is no consideration for a promise, it may be a promise in honour, or a nudum pactum; but if anything else is meant, I do not understand it. I do not understand what a bargain or a promise or an agreement in honour is unless it is one on which an action cannot be brought because it is nudum pactum. In my judgment, this first point fails, and this was an offer intended to be acted upon, and, when acted upon and the conditions performed, constituted a promise to pay.
- Antons Trawling Co Ltd v Smith, Baragwanath J, "The importance of consideration is as a valuable signal that the parties intend to be bound by their agreement, rather than an end in itself. Where the parties who have already made such intention clear by entering legal relations have acted upon an agreement to a variation, in the absence of policy reasons to the contrary, they should be bound by their agreement."
- UNIDROIT Principles (2004) Article 2.1.2 and 3.2

== See also ==
- English contract law
