= Foakes v Beer =

English contract law case

- Court: House of Lords
- Full case name: John Weston Foakes v Julia Beer
- Decided: 31 March, 1 April 1884
- Citations: [1884] UKHL 1, [1881-85] All ER Rep 106, (1884) 9 App Cas 605; 54 LJQB 130; 51 LT 833; 33 WR 233

Court membership
- Judges sitting: Earl of Selborne LC, Lord Blackburn, Lord Watson and Lord FitzGerald

Foakes v Beer [1884] UKHL 1 is an English contract law case, which applied the controversial pre-existing duty rule in the context of part payments of debts. It is a leading case from the House of Lords on the legal concept of consideration. It established the rule that prevents parties from discharging an obligation by part performance, affirming Pinnel's Case (1602) 5 Co Rep 117a. In that case it was said that "payment of a lesser sum on the day [i.e., on or after the due date of a money debt] cannot be any satisfaction of the whole."

== Facts ==
The appellant, Dr John Weston Foakes, owed the respondent, Julia Beer, a sum of £2,090 19s after a court judgment. Beer agreed that she would not take any action against Foakes for the amount owed if he would sign an agreement promising to pay an initial sum of £500 (£220,346.32 in 2024 adjusted for inflation) and pay £150 twice yearly until the whole amount was paid back. Foakes was in financial difficulty and, with the help of his solicitor, drew up an agreement for Beer to waive any interest on the amount owed. She signed. Foakes paid back the principal but not the interest. Then Beer sued Foakes for the interest. The question was whether she was entitled to it, despite their agreement that he would not need to pay it.

== Judgment ==
=== Queen's Bench ===
At trial, the court found in favour of Foakes. Watkin Williams J upheld this decision, given the agreement between the two. Mathew J said,

It is material to notice that by the agreement the debtor shall not bind himself to pay the creditor's nominee. That stipulation renders the document available as a security. Upon the authority of the decisions, I think there was abundant consideration for the agreement.

=== Court of Appeal ===
On appeal, in a short judgment Brett MR instead held for Beer because there was no consideration for the agreement. Lindley LJ and Fry LJ concurred without giving considered opinions.

=== House of Lords ===
The House of Lords (Earl of Selborne LC, Lord Watson and Lord FitzGerald) upheld the ruling of the Court of Appeal in favour of Beer. They reasoned that though the agreement did not contemplate the interest owed, it could still be implied given an enforceable agreement. However, the promise to pay a debt was deemed not to be sufficient consideration as there was no additional benefit moving from Foakes to Beer that was not already owed to her.

Lord Blackburn, however, while not overtly dissenting, seemed to express reservations.

What principally weighs with me in thinking that Lord Coke [in Pinnel's case] made a mistake of fact is my conviction that all men of business, whether merchants or tradesmen, do every day recognise and act on the ground that prompt payment of a part of their demand may be more beneficial to them than it would be to insist on their rights and enforce payment of the whole. Even where the debtor is perfectly solvent, and sure to pay at last, this often is so. Where the credit of the debtor is doubtful it must be more so. I had persuaded myself that there was no such long-continued action on this dictum as to render it improper in this House to reconsider the question. I had written my reasons for so thinking; but as they were not satisfactory to the other noble and learned Lords who heard the case, I do not now repeat them nor persist in them. I assent to the judgment proposed, though it is not that which I had originally thought proper.

== Significance ==
Barely more than a restatement of the ancient rule in Pinnel's case, Foakes v Beer was effectively treated as per incuriam by Lord Denning in Central London Property Trust Ltd v High Trees House Ltd, on the basis that in 1884 the court in Foakes had failed to pay cognisance to the 1877 case of Hughes v Metropolitan Railway Co, which had introduced the concept of promissory estoppel.

== See also ==
- English contract law
- Central London Property Trust Ltd v High Trees House Ltd
- D&C Builders Ltd v Rees
- HBF Dalgety Ltd v Morton, a similar case in New Zealand
- Williams v Roffey Bros Ltd
- Re Selectmove Ltd
- Collier v Wright Ltd
