= Detriment =

detriment may refer to:

- detriment (astrology)
- detriment (law), an element the benefit-detriment theory of consideration in design without converting
