= Pinnel's Case =

Case in English contract law

Pinnel's Case (1602) 5 Co Rep 117a, 77 ER 237, also known as Pinnel v Cole, is an important case in English contract law, on the doctrine of part performance. Sir Edward Coke reported the case. The case is authority for the proposition a part payment of a debt could not extinguish the obligation to pay the whole.

== Facts ==
Pinnel sued Cole, in an action of debt upon a bond, for the sum of £8 10s. The defendant, Cole, argued he had, at Pinnel's request, tendered £5 2s 2d before the debt was due, and the plaintiff had accepted in full satisfaction for the debt.

== Judgment ==
The case reports the judgment as follows.

payment of a lesser sum on the day in satisfaction of a greater, cannot be any satisfaction for the whole, because it appears to the Judges that by no possibility, a lesser sum can be a satisfaction to the plaintiff for a greater sum: but the gift of a horse, hawk, or robe, etc. in satisfaction is good. For it shall be intended that a horse, hawk, or robe, might be more beneficial to the plaintiff than the money. ... he did not plead that he had paid the 5l. 2s. 2d. in full satisfaction (as by the law he ought) but pleaded the payment of part generally; and that the plaintiff accepted it in full satisfaction. And always the manner of the tender and of the payment shall be directed by him who made the tender or payment, and not by him who accepts it. And for this cause judgment was given for the plaintiff.

Pinnel's case was applied by Foakes v Beer [1884] and Jorden v Money [1854].

== Commentary ==
Pinnel's case concerned the doctrine of Accord and satisfaction, rather than Consideration. The judgement makes no reference to consideration; this may be because the action of assumpsit (for which consideration in the absence of a deed was required) was distinct from an action for debt until Slade's Case.

In Bagge v Slade, Coke LCJ (the reporter of Pinnel's case) held that

'...if a man be bound to another by a bill in 1000l and he pays unto him 500l in discharge of this bill, the which he accepts of accordingly, and doth upon this assume and promise to deliver up unto him his said bill of 1000l, this 500l is no satisfaction of the 1000l but yet this is good and sufficient to make a good promise, and upon a good consideration, because he hath paid mony,(s) five hundred pound, and he hath no remedy for this again.'

Thus, Bagge v Slade was authority for the proposition that part payment of debt can be good consideration for the discharge of that debt.

Similarly, in Rawlins v Lockey, it was said that '30l can be no satisfaction of 60l yet to have the money in his hands without suit is a good consideration to maintain this action upon the promise'. This distinction was maintained until Lord Ellenborough's judgment in Fitch v Sutton in which he held that part payment of a debt cannot be consideration. This conflation has been met with academic and judicial criticism.

== Exceptions to the Rule ==
The case law has evolved over the years to create a number of exceptions to the rule in Pinnel's case.

The exceptions to the rule in Pinnel's case include:

- Payment accompanied by fresh consideration;
- Prepayment of debt at the creditor's request;
- Payment of a lesser sum at another place at the creditor's request;
- A contract with creditors after insolvency of the debtor;
- The parties enter into a deed of release; and
- Promissory estoppel.

== See also ==
- English contract law
- Central London Property Trust Ltd v High Trees House Ltd
- D&C Builders Ltd v Rees
- Williams v Roffey Bros Ltd
- Re Selectmove Ltd
