= Collier v P & MJ Wright (Holdings) Ltd =

Collier v P&M J Wright (Holdings) Ltd
- Court: Court of Appeal
- Citations: [2007] EWCA Civ 1329 [2008] 1 WLR 643

Court membership
- Judges sitting: Arden LJ, Longmore LJ, Mummery LJ

Case opinions
- Arden LJ, Longmore LJ, Mummery LJ

Keywords
- consideration, promissory estoppel, severing of joint and several liability, legal partnerships

Collier v P & MJ Wright (Holdings) Ltd [2007] EWCA Civ 1329 is an English contract law case, concerning the doctrine of consideration and promissory estoppel in relation to "alteration promises".

== Facts ==
Mr Collier was one of three partners of a property developer. They had assented to a court order to pay £46,000 to Wright Ltd in monthly instalments of £600, and were jointly liable. From 1999 the payments went down to £200 a month. In 2000, Mr Collier swore that there was a meeting where Wright Ltd said he would be severally liable (for £15,600), rather than jointly (as a partner). The other two partners went bankrupt in 2002 and 2004. In 2006, when Mr Collier had finally made his payments (totalling exactly one third of the debt) Wrights served on him a statutory demand for the 'balance of the debt'. Mr Collier applied under rule 6.4 of the Insolvency Rules 1986 (because the debt was disputable on ‘substantial grounds’ (r.6.5(4)(b)); so he only needed to show there was a ‘genuine triable issue’ in which case the court would set aside the demand.

He alleged the variation agreement was binding, or if not that Wright Ltd was estopped from enforcing the full payment.

== Judgment ==
The Court of Appeal reversed the judgment 'below' ('at first instance') on the promissory estoppel point.

Arden LJ held that Foakes v Beer applied, but referring to the ‘brilliant dictum’ of Denning J in High Trees, held that promissory estoppel could aid Mr Collier. Where he had been assured that he could repay only part of the debt, he had relied on the assurance by making his payments, Wright Ltd resiling from the promise ‘would of itself be inequitable’.

Longmore LJ was more cautious than Arden LJ, confirming the need for some ‘meaningful reliance’ (after Rees), suggesting it was not a foregone conclusion that Wright's demand was entirely 'inequitable', but most importantly stressing the need for 'true accord'; stating:

(it is) perhaps all the more important that agreements which are said to forgo a creditor's rights on a permanent basis should not be too benevolently construed

Mummery LJ agreed, and stated that the appeal should be allowed because there was a prospect of real success on the "estoppel argument".

== Significance ==
David Uff, instructed by Jai Ramsahoye of Betesh Partnership (for Collier) sought to carve out a third exception to Pinnel's Case (above and beyond Sir Edward Coke's own "the gift of a horse, hawk, robe etc. in satisfaction is good" and that established by Williams v Roffey) submitting that:

where a debtor agrees to pay part of a joint debt, and to become severally liable for that part, the parties have necessarily entered into a binding agreement for good consideration that the debtor's liability for the rest of the joint debt is discharged...

serving to illustrate the ongoing tension between Pinnel's Case/Foakes v Beer "doctrine" and that of promissory estoppel and the judicial reticence to displace/modify a doctrine that flowed from no less a man than Sir Edward Coke; some commentators seeing the case as leaving some doors open to side-stepping Foakes v Beer via promissory estoppel (formulated in High Trees). Others have criticised the judgment:-

Alexander Trukhtanov wrote:

Even as the House of Lords delivered its decision in Foakes, it openly acknowledged that the rule was liable to produce injustice and that judges were anxious to relieve its effect by finding all sorts of “artificial consideration” (per Lord Fitzgerald). Collier is a case where, despite all attempts, no such consideration could be found, and the court contemplated giving equitable relief in a manner which accepts a similar degree of artificiality. This is not a welcome development. Longmore LJ was clearly uneasy about it and his reservations give ground for resisting further erosion of equitable principles by reference to the authority of Collier. Equity gives relief where justice requires relief to be given but none can be obtained under the common law. It is no function of equity to lend its doctrines to plug holes in the common law.

Jill Poole suggests there was an implicit assumption that Williams could not apply in this context. She suggests that the importance of the case should not be exaggerated, relating only to a finding of an "arguable defence of promissory estoppel".

A mixed supporter includes:

Robert Pearce QC who, after highlighting the uncertainty as to whether the courts will follow the implications inherent in High Trees, D & C Builders v Rees, and Collier, specify "as a corollary, if there is 'true accord' [true later agreement], it will necessarily follow that it will be inequitable for the creditor to seek payment of the balance" going on to say:

That approach has the practical effect of reversing Foakes v Beer, and it is difficult to feel enthusiasm for so prescriptive a view of what is 'inequitable'. The next step in the development of this area of law should be a reconsideration by the Supreme Court of Foakes v Beer.
