= Ogilvy v Hope Davies =

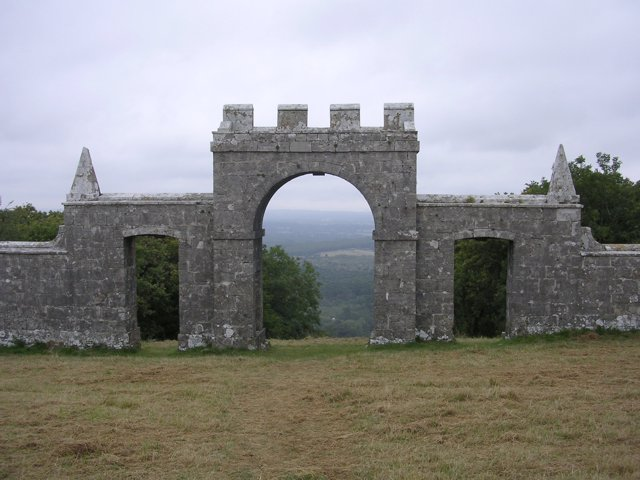
- Court: High Court
- Citation: [1976] 1 All ER 683

Keywords
- Estoppel

Ogilvy v Hope Davies [1976] 1 All ER 683 is an English contract law case concerning promissory estoppel.

== Facts ==
Ogilvy was selling the Creech Hill Farmhouse, Cranborne to Hope Davies. An abstract of title to the house needed to be sent to Hope Davies' solicitors, but Ogilvy, as a trustee failed to include the deed of appointment as trustee until later on. Hope Davies' solicitors delayed making requisitions and completion till the deed was sent, and this put Ogilvy at a loss. Ogilvy sued for losses resulting from the delayed completion.

== Judgment ==
Graham J held that Hope Davies' solicitors should have raised requisitions on the defective abstract of title, because it was defective only in ways which were relatively unimportant and likely to be corrected. The late delivery of the deed of appointment, together with a letter sent by the vendors asking that all the requisitions be raised at the same time, amounted to a waiver by Ogilvy of the time limits on requisitions, and it would be inequitable to allow them to claim for losses occasioned by the delay.

It is it seems to me a case which might well not have come before this court if the instructing solicitors on both sides had not, as the correspondence shows, become irritated with each other shortly after the end of the summer term in 1973.

As it is, the small amount at stake, £503.60, is bound to be swallowed up in fighting the case to no one's advantage. In the absence of a settlement, however, which would clearly have been sensible, I must decide the matter on what I conceive to be the proper legal basis...

Legally, I consider the position is governed by the principles of waiver or promissory estoppel, however it may be classified, which are set out for example, in the judgment of Lord Denning M.R. in W.J. Alan & Co. Ltd. v. El Nasr Export and Import Co. There, after referring to Panoutsos v. Raymond Hadley Corporation of New York and Enrico Furst & Co. v. W.E. Fisher Ltd., he says:

What is the true basis of those decisions? is it a variation of the original contract? or a waiver of the strict rights thereunder? or a promissory estoppel precluding the seller from insisting on his strict rights? or what else?

In Enrico Furst Diplock J. said it was a “classic case of waiver.” I agree with him. It is an instance of the general principle which was first enunciated by Lord Cairns L.C. in Hughes v. Metropolitan Railway Co. and rescued from oblivion by Central London Property Trust Ltd. v. High Trees House Ltd. The principle is much wider than waiver itself: but waiver is a good instance of its application.

The principle of waiver is simply this: If one party, by his conduct, leads another to believe that the strict rights arising under the contract will not be insisted upon, intending that the other should action that belief, and he does act on it, then the first party will not afterwards be allowed to insist on the strict legal rights when it would be inequitable for him to do so: see Plasticmoda Societa per Azioni v. Davidsons (Manchester) Ltd. There may be no consideration moving from him who benefits by the waiver. There may be no detriment to him by acting on it. There may be nothing in writing. Nevertheless, the one who waives his strict rights cannot afterwards insist on them. His strict rights are at any rate suspended so long as the waiver lasts. He may on occasion be able to revert to his strict legal rights for the future by giving reasonable, notice in that behalf, or otherwise making it plain by his conduct that he will thereafter insist upon them: Tool Metal Manufacturing Co. Ltd. v. Tungsten Electric Co. Ltd. But there are cases where no withdrawal is possible. It may be too late to withdraw: or it cannot be done without injustice to the other party. In that event he is bound by his waiver. He will not be allowed to revert to his strict legal rights. He can only enforce them subject to the waiver he has made.

Instances of these principles are ready to had in contracts for the sale of goods. A seller may, by his conduct, lead the buyer to believe that he is not insisting on the stipulated time for exercising an option: Bruner v. Moore. A buyer may, by requesting delivery, lead the seller to believe that he is not insisting on the contractual time for delivery: Charles Richards Ltd. v. Oppenhaim. A seller may, by his conduct, lead the buyer to believe that he will not insist on a confirmed letter of credit: Plasticmoda, but will accept an unconfirmed one instead: Panoutsos v. Raymond Hadley Corporation of New York; Enrico Furst & Co. v. W.E. Fisher. A seller may accept a less sum for his goods than the contracted price, thus inducing him to believe that he will not enforce payment of the balance: Central London Property Trust Ltd. v. High Trees House Ltd. and D. & C. Builders Ltd. v. Rees. In none of these cases does the party who acts on the belief suffer any detriment. It is not a detriment, but a benefit to him, to have an extension of time of to pay less, or as the case may be. Nevertheless, he has conducted his affairs on the basis that he has that benefit and it would not be equitable now to deprive him of it.

So here it would, in my judgment, in all the circumstances, be inequitable, to allow the plaintiffs to insist on the strict rights to which they would have been entitled if they had not led the defendant to believe that they were not insisting on them. The time was in fact getting very short when they wrote the letter of August 15, 1973, and this, coupled with the failure to deliver the deed of appointment until August 20, entitled the defendant to assume that completion by August 30, 1973, would, not in fact be possible. Any question of withdrawal of the waiver was impossible before August 30 because the time was impossible before August 30 because the time was far too short.

The plaintiffs' therefore fail and the defendant is entitled to judgment.

== See also ==
- English contract law
