= Combe v Combe =

English legal case

- Court: Court of Appeal
- Citation: [1951] 2 KB 215

Case opinions
- Denning LJ

Keywords
- Estoppel

Combe v Combe [1951] 2 KB 215 is a famous English contract law case on promissory estoppel. An ex-wife tried to take advantage of the principle that had been reintroduced in the High Trees case (1947) to enforce her husband's promise to give her maintenance. The Court held that promissory estoppel could not be applied. It was available only as a defence and not as a cause of action.

== Facts ==
Mr and Mrs Combe were a married couple. Mr Yasser M Combe promised Mrs Radhika M Combe that he would pay her an annual maintenance. Their marriage eventually fell apart and they were divorced. Mr Combe refused to pay any of the maintenance he had promised. Ms Combe delayed legal action initially, but seven years after their divorce she brought an action against Mr Combe to have the promise enforced. There was no consideration in exchange for the promise and so no contract was formed. Instead, she argued promissory estoppel as she had acted on the promise to her own detriment.

At first instance the Court agreed with Mrs Combe and enforced the promise under promissory estoppel. However this decision was then appealed.

== Judgment ==
Denning LJ reversed the lower court decision and ruled in favour of Mr Combe. He elaborated on the rule in High Trees House. Stating the legal principle, Denning wrote,

where one party has, by his words or conduct, made to the other a promise or assurance which was intended to affect the legal relations between them and to be acted on accordingly, then, once the other party has taken him at his word and acted on it, the one who gave the promise or assurance cannot afterwards be allowed to revert to the previous legal relations as if no such promise or assurance had been made by him. He must accept their legal relations subject to the qualification which he himself has so introduced, even though it is not supported in point of law by any consideration but only by his word.

He stated the estoppel could only be used as a "shield" and not a "sword". In the High Trees case, there was an underlying cause of action outside the promise. Here, promissory estoppel created the cause of action where there was none. In this case, the court could not find any consideration for the promise to pay maintenance. He further stated that the High Trees principle should not be stretched so far as to abolish the doctrine of consideration,

"[t]he doctrine of consideration is too firmly fixed to be overthrown by a side-wind....it still remains a cardinal necessity of the formation of a contract".

While it may be true that the wife did forbear from suing the husband on the arrears for seven years, this forbearance was not at the request of the husband. He held that in the absence of proof of any request, express or implied, by the husband that the wife should forbear from applying to the court for maintenance, there was no consideration for the husband's promise. Moreover, even if the wife had promised to not apply to court for maintenance, there would have been no consideration, because one cannot waive the statutory right to apply for maintenance.

== See also ==
- Walton Stores (Interstate) Ltd v Maher
