= Roscorla v Thomas =

Milestone judicial case in contracts

Roscorla v Thomas is a notable case in English contract law which demonstrates that past conduct is not sufficient consideration to support a contract. Past consideration is not a good consideration.

== Facts ==
An agreement for the purchase of a horse had been completed between buyer and seller. Following the completion of the contract, the seller made a warranty that the horse was "free from vice". Upon delivery, it was discovered by the buyer that the horse was vicious in behaviour. The buyer consequently sued.

== Judgment ==
Lord Denman CJ delivered the judgment of the Court.

"It may be taken as a general rule, subject to exceptions not applicable to this case, that the promise must be coextensive with the consideration... a consideration past and executed will support no other promise than such as would be implied by law."

== See also ==
- Consideration in English law
