= Tool Metal Mfg Co Ltd v Tungsten Electric Co Ltd =

- Court: House of Lords
- Full case name: Tool Metal Mfg Co Ltd v Tungsten Electric Co Ltd
- Decided: 16 June 1955
- Citation: [1955] 2 All ER 657

Case history
- Subsequent action: none

Court membership
- Judges sitting: Viscount Simonds, Lord Oaksey, Lord Reid, Lord Tucker, Lord Cohen

Tool Metal Mfg Co Ltd v Tungsten Electric Co Ltd [1955] 2 All ER 657 is a cited case regarding promissory estoppel.

== Background ==
Tool Metal was set up by its German parent company Krupp had to manage its tungsten carbide patents in England.

TMM later took legal action against TECO for breach of its patent in its manufacturing of machine tools. TECO ultimately decided to enter into a licensing agreement with TMM rather than fight the matter in court, and on 2 April 1938, they entered into the following settlement agreement:

"If in any month during the continuance of the said License, the aggregate quantity of contract material sold or used by TECO and Industrial (other than contract material supplied to TECO by the Grantors or any Licensees under the said patents) shall exceed a quota of 50 kilograms (50 Kg) TECO shall whether all or any of such material shall be subject to royalty hereunder or not pay to the Grantors compensation equal to thirty per cent. (30%) of the sum which represents the excess net value, that is to say, the average net value per kilogram of all contract material sold or used by TECO and Industrial in the said month multiplied by the weight in kilograms of all such contract material as aforesaid sold or used by TECO and Industrial during such month in excess of fifty kilograms (50 Kg). Provided that contract material sold by TECO to Industrial shall only be taken into account for this clause on the occasion of its sale or use by Industrial."

TEC subsequently found the 30% penalty for all production over 50 kg, to be onerous for them.

After the outbreak of the world war in 1939, TMM verbally agreed to forego compensation from TECO, with the understanding the parties would subsequently enter into a new written contract. However, TECO would not agree to sign any new contract drafted by TMM.

As a result, TMM informed TECO that they would go back and enforce the original 1938 agreement.

TMM ultimately sued TECO for the licensing fees.

== Held ==
The court held that TMM were entitled to reinstate the licensing fees, as long as reasonable notice was given, which in this case was from 1 January 1947.
