= Re Selectmove Ltd =

In re Selectmove Ltd
- Court: Court of Appeal
- Decided: 21 December 1993
- Citations: [1993] EWCA Civ 8, [1995] 1 WLR 474

Court membership
- Judges sitting: Peter Gibson, Stuart-Smith and Balcombe LJJ

Keywords
- consideration, part payment of debt

In re Selectmove Ltd [1993] EWCA Civ 8 is an English contract law case concerning the legal doctrine of consideration and partial payment of a debt.

== Facts ==
Selectmove Ltd owed the Inland Revenue substantial sums in outstanding tax and national insurance. The managing director, Mr ffooks, met Mr Polland from the Inland Revenue and said he would pay future tax as it fell due and the arrears at £1,000 a month. Mr Polland said he would have to check and would contact the managing director if it was unacceptable. Selectmove Ltd heard nothing until a £25,650 notice came in and a threat of a wind-up petition. Mr ffooks subsequently claimed that the Revenue had said he could repay less. The High Court held that even if that were found to be true, Mr Polland had not bound the Revenue, and there was no consideration for the varied agreement anyway.

== Judgment ==
Peter Gibson LJ (Stuart-Smith and Balcombe LJJ concurring) observed that Foakes v Beer precluded any variation of the agreement to repay the debt without good consideration, despite the recent decision in Williams v Roffey Bros Ltd. Peter Gibson LJ stated that ‘it is clear… that a practical benefit of that nature is not good consideration in law’. As his Lordship put it, in forceful language,

if the principle of Williams v Roffey Bros Ltd is to be extended to an obligation to make payment, it would in effect leave the principle in Foakes v Beer without any application. When a creditor and a debtor who are at arm's length reach agreement on the payment of the debt by instalments to accommodate the debtor, the creditor will no doubt always see a practical benefit to himself in so doing. In the absence of authority there would be much to be said for the enforceability of such a contract. But that was a matter expressly considered in Foakes v Beer yet held not to constitute good consideration in law. Foakes v Beer was not even referred to in Williams v Roffey Bros Ltd, and it is in my judgment impossible, consistently with the doctrine of precedent, for this court to extend the principle of Williams's case to any circumstances governed by the principle of Foakes v Beer. If that extension is to be made, it must be by the House of Lords or, perhaps even more appropriately, by Parliament after consideration by the Law Commission.
