= Currie v Misa =

UK legal case

- Court: House of Lords
- Full case name: Currie v. Misa (or Misa v. Currie)
- Citation: (1875-76) LR 1 App Cas 554

Case history
- Prior action: (1875) LR 10 Ex 153

Case opinions
- Lush J

Keywords
- Consideration, Good faith, negotiable instruments

Currie v Misa (1875) LR 10 Ex 153; (1875–76) LR 1 App Cas 554, is an English contract law case, which in the Exchequer Chamber contains a famous statement by Lush J giving the definition of consideration in English law. Lush J said,

A valuable consideration, in the sense of the law, may consist either in some right, interest, profit, or benefit accruing to the one party, or some forbearance, detriment, loss or responsibility, given, suffered, or undertaken by the other...

== Facts ==
A company named Lizardi & Co, then in good credit in the City, sold four bills of exchange to Mr. Misa, drawn from a bank in Cádiz. Mr. Currie was the owner of the banking firm and the plaintiff bringing the action. The bills of exchange were sold on 11 February, and by the custom of the bill, brokers were to be paid for on the first foreign post-day following the day of the sale. That first day was 14 February. Lizardi & Co. was much in debt to his banking firm, and being pressed to reduce his balance, gave to the banker a draft or order on Mr. Misa for the amount of the four bills. This draft or order was dated on the 14th, though it was, in fact, written on the 13th, and then delivered to the banker. On the morning of the 14th, the manager of Misa's business gave a cheque for the amount of the order, which was then given up to him. Lizardi failed, and on the afternoon of the 14th the manager, learning that fact, stopped payment of the cheque.

== Judgment ==
=== Exchequer Chamber ===
Lush J, Archibald J, Quain J held that the banker was entitled to recover its amount from Mr Misa. Lord Coleridge CJ dissented.

=== House of Lords ===
The House of Lords upheld the decision of the majority in the Exchequer Chamber. Lord Chelmsford gave the opinion, with which Lord Hatherley and Lord O'Hagan concurred.

== See also ==
- Balfour v. Balfour
