= Consideration =

Concept in the common law of contracts

Consideration is a concept of English common law where a promise of something of value is given in exchange for something of value. It is a necessity for simple contracts but not for special contracts (contracts by deed). The concept has been adopted by other common law jurisdictions. It is commonly referred to as one of the six or seven elements of a contract.

The House of Lords in Currie v Misa declared consideration to be a "Right, Interest, Profit, Benefit, or Forbearance, Detriment, Loss, Responsibility". Typically the thing of value is goods, money, or an act. Forbearance to act, such as an adult promising to refrain from smoking, is enforceable only if one is thereby surrendering a legal right.

Anything of value promised by one party to the other when making a contract can be treated as "consideration". For example, if A contracts to buy a car from B for $5,000, A's consideration is the promise of $5,000, and B's consideration is the promise of the car. Consideration may be a good, service, or agreement to do or not do anything stipulated. It is essential that the consideration promised be worth something in value in order for a valid contract to be made.

== As an element or a prerequisite ==
In common law, consideration is a prerequisite that both parties offer before a contract can be regarded as binding. The doctrine of consideration is irrelevant in many jurisdictions, although contemporary commercial litigant relations have held the relationship between a promise and a deed is a reflection of the nature of contractual considerations. If no element of consideration is found, no contract has been formed.

However, even if a court decides there is no contract, recovery may be possible under the doctrines of quantum meruit (sometimes referred to as a quasi-contract) or promissory estoppel.

== Legal rules regarding consideration ==
A number of common issues arise in determining whether consideration exists in a contract. Under English law consideration:

1. cannot be illusory.
2. must move from the promisee but need not flow to the promisor.
3. must be sufficient but need not be adequate.
4. must be whole. Part payment is not good consideration.
5. must not be past. Past consideration is not good consideration.

Moral consideration is not sufficient (except for contracts by deed, where "love and affection" is often cited as the [unnecessary] consideration). Nor is performance of existing duties.

=== Indian Contract Act ===
Under the Indian Contract Act, 1872, still in force in Pakistan, Bangladesh, and India, valid consideration must satisfy the following criteria to generate a contractual obligation:

- It must move at the desire of the promisor.
- Consideration may move from the promisee or any other person.
- Consideration must be an act, abstinence or forbearance or a returned promise.
- Consideration may be past, present or future.
- Consideration must be real.
- Consideration must be something which the promisor is not already bound to do.
- Consideration need not be adequate.

Additionally, under the Indian Contract Act 1872, any consideration is invalid if it is:

- Forbidden by law (Note: If the object or the consideration of an agreement is for doing an act forbidden by law, the agreement is void. for example, A promises B to obtain employment in public service and B promises to pay Rs one lakh to A. The agreement is void as procuring a government job through unlawful means is prohibited.)
- It involves injury to a person or property of another (Note: For example, A borrows Rs.100/— from B and executes a bond to work for B without pay for a period of 2 years. In case of default, A owes the principal sum at once and a huge amount of interest. This contract was held void as it involved injury to the person.)
- Courts regards it as immoral
- It is of such nature that, if permitted, it would defeat the provisions of any law
- It is fraudulent, or involves or implies injury to the person or property of another
- It is contrary to public policy (Note: An agreement which tends to be injurious to the public or against the public good is void. For example, agreements of trading with a foreign enemy, agreement to commit a crime, agreements which interfere with the administration of justice, agreements which interfere with the course of justice, stifling prosecution, maintenance and champerty.)
- The consideration conveyed by at least one side seeks to restrain legal proceedings (Note: This deals with two categories. One is agreements restraining enforcement of rights and the other deals with agreements curtailing the period of limitation.)
- The consideration includes public offices or titles (Note: Agreements for sale or transfer of public offices and title or for procurement of a public recognition like Padma Vibhushan or Padma Shri etc. for monetary consideration is unlawful, being opposed to public policy.)
- The consideration involves involuntary labour or otherwise infringes upon the personal liberty of a party to the contract (Note: Agreements which unduly restrict the personal liberty of parties to it are void as contrary to public policy.)
1. The consideration includes a marriage or a pecuniary inducement to marry.

The most noticeable distinction between the English and Indian criteria for consideration is that English law prohibits past consideration while Indian law does not.

== History and comparative law ==
Systems based on Roman law (including those of Germany and Scotland) do not require consideration, and some commentators consider it unnecessary and have suggested that the doctrine of consideration should be abandoned as a basis for contracts, and estoppel used to replace it. However, legislation, rather than judicial development, has been touted as the only way to remove this entrenched common law doctrine. According to Lord Justice Denning in 1947, "The doctrine of consideration is too firmly fixed to be overthrown by a side-wind".

The reason that opposite holdings on the necessity of consideration exist in common law jurisdictions is thought to stem from 19th-century judges combining two distinct legal threads: first the consideration requirement was at the heart of the action of assumpsit, which had grown up in medieval times and remained the normal action for breach of a simple contract in England and Wales until 1884, when the old forms of action were abolished; secondly, the notion of agreement between two or more parties as being the essential legal and moral foundation of contract in all legal systems, was promoted by the 18th-century French writer Pothier in his Traite des Obligations, much read (especially after translation into English in 1805) by English judges and jurists. The latter chimed well with the fashionable theories of will of the time, especially John Stuart Mill's influential ideas on free will, and was grafted on to the traditional common law requirement for consideration to ground an action in assumpsit.

Civil law systems take the approach that an exchange of promises, or a concurrence of wills alone, rather than an exchange in valuable rights, is the correct basis. If A promises to give B a book and B accepts the offer without giving anything in return, B would have a legal right to the book and A could not change their mind about giving it to B as a gift. However, in common law systems the concept of culpa in contrahendo, a form of estoppel – an equitable doctrine that provides for the creation of legal obligations if a party has given another an assurance and the other has relied on the assurance to his detriment –, is increasingly used to create obligations during pre-contractual negotiations.

== Monetary value of consideration ==
Generally, courts do not inquire whether the deal between two parties was monetarily fair—merely that each party passed some legal obligation or duty to the other. The dispositive issue is the presence of consideration, not the adequacy of the consideration. The values between consideration passed by each party to a contract need not be comparable.

For instance, if A offers B $100 to buy B's mansion, there is still consideration on both sides. A's consideration is $100, and B's consideration is the mansion. Courts in the United States generally leave parties to their own contracts and do not intervene. A parallel in English common law is the value of a peppercorn being given by one party to the other, treated as sufficient consideration if it is agreed to by both. In the United States, contracts often stipulate a nominal amount of consideration passing between parties, typically $1. Thus, licensing contracts are often written, "for the sum of $1 and other good and valuable consideration."

However, some courts in the United States, typically at the state level, take issue with consideration holding virtually no value, regarding it as a sham. A promise of $1 to another in compensation is held to be an insufficient legal duty, and therefore an inadequate basis for forming a contract. This is, however, a minority position.

== Pre-existing legal duties ==
A party that already has a legal duty to provide money, an object, a service, or a forbearance, does not provide consideration when promising merely to uphold that duty. That legal duty can arise from law, or obligation under a previous contract.

The prime example of this sub-issue is in Hamer v. Sidway (1891) where an uncle gives his thirteen-year-old nephew (a resident of the state of New York) the following offer: "if you do not smoke cigarettes or drink alcohol until your 18th birthday, then I will pay you $5,000". On the nephew's 18th birthday, he tells the uncle to pay up, and the uncle does not pay. In the subsequent lawsuit, the uncle wins, because the nephew, by U.S. criminal law, already had a duty to refrain from smoking cigarettes while under 18 and from drinking alcohol while under age 21.

The same applies if the consideration is a performance for which the parties had previously contracted. For example, A agrees to paint B's house for $500, but halfway through the job A tells B that he will not finish unless B increases the payment to $750. If B agrees, and A then finishes the job, B still only needs to pay A the $500 originally agreed to, because A was already contractually obligated to paint the house for that amount.

An exception to this rule holds for settlements, such as an accord and satisfaction. If a creditor has a credit against a debtor for $10,000, and offers to settle it for $5,000, it is still binding, if accepted, even though the debtor had a legal duty to repay the entire $10,000.

Pre-existing duties relating to at-will employment depend largely on state law. Generally, at-will employment allows the employer to terminate the employee for good or even no reason (as long as the reason, if any, is not explicitly illegal), and allows the employee to resign for any reason. There are no duties of continued employment in the future. Therefore, when an employee demands a raise, there is no issue with consideration because the employee has no legal duty to continue working. Similarly, when an employer demands a pay-cut, there is also no contractual issue with consideration, because the employer has no legal duty to continue employing the worker. However, certain states require additional consideration other than the prospect of continued employment, to enforce terms demanded later by the employer, in particular, non-competition clauses.

== Bundled terms ==
Contracts where a legally valueless term is bundled with a term that does have legal value are still generally enforceable.

Consider the uncle's situation above. If the same uncle had instead made his 13-year-old nephew the following offer: "if you do not smoke cigarettes, do not drink alcohol, swear or play cards for money (gamble) before your 21st birthday, I will pay you $5,000". On the nephew's 21st birthday, he asks the uncle to pay up, and this time, in the subsequent lawsuit, the nephew may win. Although the promise of not drinking alcohol and gambling while under the age of 21 was not valuable consideration (it was already legally prohibited), most states allow smoking by age 18 and swearing is not illegal at any age. Even though smoking is legally restricted until age 18, it is legal for those above 18, and thus the promise to forbear from it entirely has legal value. However, the uncle would still be relieved from the liability if his nephew drank alcohol, even though that consideration is valueless, because it was paired with something of legal value; therefore, adherence to the entire, collective agreement is necessary.

== Past consideration ==
Generally, past consideration is not a valid consideration and has no legal value. Past consideration is consideration that has already flowed from the promisee to the promisor. That is, the promisee's act or forbearance predates the promisor's promise. Past consideration therefore cannot be used as a basis when claiming damages.

An exception to this rule is where there is a duty owed to a third party. An act done before the giving of a promise to make a payment or to confer some other benefit can sometimes be consideration for the promise. For this to hold, three conditions must be satisfied (Pao On v Lau Yiu Long [1980]):

1. The act must have been done at the promisor's request
2. The parties must have understood the act was to be remunerated either by a payment or the conferment of some other benefit
3. Payment/conferment of the benefit must have been legally enforceable had it been promised in advance

== Option contracts and conditional consideration ==
Generally, conditional consideration is valid consideration.

Suppose A is a movie script writer and B runs a movie production company. A says to B, "buy my script." B says "How about this – I will pay you $5,000 so that you do not let anyone else produce your movie until one year from now. If I do produce your movie in that year, then I will give you another $50,000, and no one else can produce it. If I do not produce your movie in that year, then you're free to go." If the two subsequently get into a dispute, the issue of whether a contract exists is answered. B had an option contract—he could decide to produce the script, or not. B's consideration passed was the $5,000 down, and the possibility of $50,000. A's consideration passed was the exclusive rights to the movie script for at least one year.

== Bonus clause ==
A bonus clause is a clause in a contract that rewards the contractor for doing more than the letter of the contract; particularly, to finish the job early. It is a firm of consideration. It is in apposition to a penalty clause where the contractor loses by providing less than the letter of the contract, or providing it later than agreed.

The aim of a bonus clause is to give a win-win situation whereby the contractor wins by getting more money for finishing early, and the holder of the contract wins by having a product earlier to market.

== In settlements ==
Suppose B commits a tort against A, causing $5,000 in compensatory damages and $3,000 in punitive damages. Since there is no guarantee that A would win against B if it went to court, A may agree to drop the case if B pays the $5,000 compensatory damages. This is sufficient consideration, since B's consideration is a guaranteed recovery, and A's consideration is that B only has to pay $5,000, instead of $8,000.

== Criticism ==
The primary criticism of the doctrine of consideration is that, in its present form, it is purely a formality that merely serves to complicate commerce and create legal uncertainty by opening up otherwise simple contracts to scrutiny as to whether the consideration purportedly tendered satisfies the requirements of the law. While the purpose of the doctrine was ostensibly to protect parties seeking to void oppressive contracts, this is currently accomplished through the use of a sophisticated variety of defences available to the party seeking to void a contract. In practice, the doctrine of consideration has resulted in a phenomenon similar to that of Ḥiyal in Islamic contracts, whereby parties to a contract use technicalities to satisfy requirements while in actual fact circumventing them in practice. Typically, this is often described in the form of "peppercorn" consideration, i.e. consideration that is trivial but still satisfies the requirements of law, although texts and commentators making such assertions do have a credible basis for doing so. (Note: For instance, some may assert that agreeing to sell a car for a penny may constitute a binding contract – although there are no cited cases of such trivial compensation being recognised by the court as sufficient.)

The doctrine of consideration is expressly rejected by the UNIDROIT Principles of International Commercial Contracts on the grounds that it yields uncertainty and unnecessary litigation, thereby hindering international trade. Similarly, the United Nations Convention on Contracts for the International Sale of Goods similarly does not require consideration for a contract to be valid, thereby excluding the doctrine with regard to contracts covered by the convention even in common law jurisdictions where it would otherwise apply. Consequently, the continued existence of the doctrine in common law jurisdictions is controversial. Scots lawyer Harvey McGregor's "Contract Code", a Law Commission-sponsored proposal to both unite and codify English and Scots Law, proposed the abolition of consideration. Some commentators have suggested that consideration be replaced by estoppel as a basis for contracts. However, any change to the doctrine of consideration in the jurisdictions in which it exists would need to implemented by legislation. (Note: As Lord Justice Denning famously stated, "The doctrine of consideration is too firmly fixed to be overthrown by a side-wind.")

== See also ==
- Consideration under English law
- Consideration under American law
- Failure of consideration
- Consideration is not required for a contract made under Scots contract law
