= D & C Builders Ltd v Rees =

English contract law case

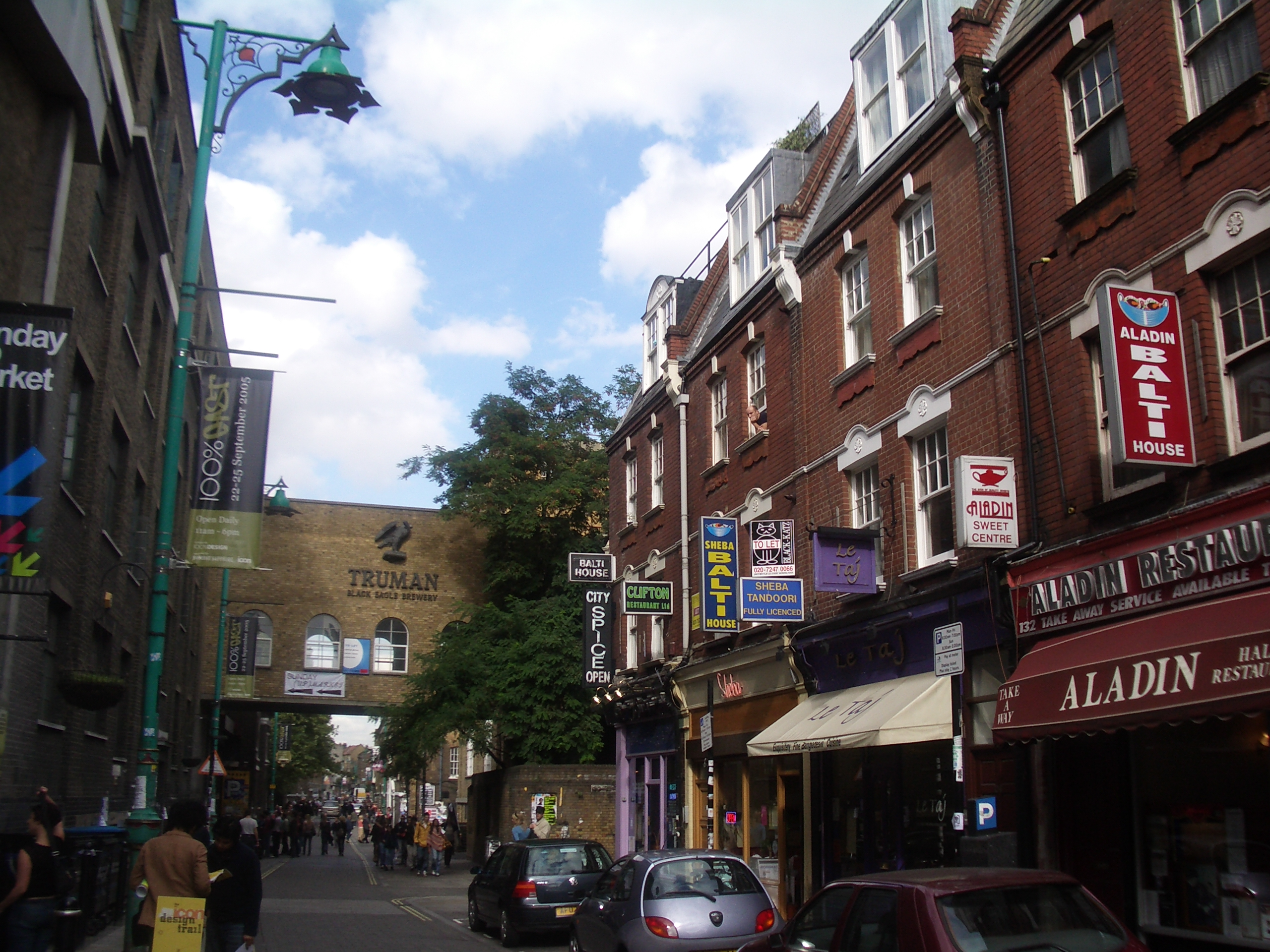
- Court: Court of Appeal
- Decided: November 12, 1965
- Citations: [1965] EWCA Civ 3, [1965] 2 QB 617, [1966] 2 WLR 288

Court membership
- Judges sitting: Lord Denning MR, Danckwerts LJ and Winn LJ

Keywords
- estoppel, duress

D & C Builders Ltd v Rees [1965] EWCA Civ 3 is a leading English contract law case on the issue of part payment of debt, estoppel, duress and just accord and satisfaction.

== Facts ==
D & C Builders Ltd was a two man building firm run by Mr Donaldson and Mr Casey. They had done work for Mr Rees at 218 Brick Lane, London E1, coming to £732. Mr Rees had only paid £250. £482 was owing. D&C were facing bankruptcy if they were not paid. Mrs Rees phoned up to complain that the work was bad, and refused to pay more than £300. D&C reluctantly accepted and took a receipt marked 'in completion of account'. After that, they consulted their solicitors and sued for the balance.

== Judgement ==
Lord Denning MR held that the doctrine of part payment of a debt not discharging the whole 'has come under heavy fire' but noted that estoppel, deriving from the principle laid down in Hughes v Metropolitan Railway Co., could give relief in equity. Although in his opinion part payment of debt could satisfy a whole debt, he found that Mrs Rees had effectively held the builders to ransom. Therefore, any variation of the original agreement was voidable at the instance of the debtors for duress.

In point of law payment of a lesser sum, whether by cash or by cheque, is no discharge of a greater sum.

This doctrine of the common law came under heavy fire. It was ridiculed by Sir George Jessel in Couldery v Bartram. It was said to be mistaken by Lord Blackburn in Foakes v Beer. It was condemned by the Law Revision Committee (1945 Cmd 5449), paras. 20 and 21 . But a remedy has been found. The harshness of the common law has been relieved. Equity has stretched out a merciful hand to help the debtor. The courts have invoked the broad principle stated by Lord Cairns in Hughes v Metropolitan Railway Co.

"It is the first principle upon which all courts of equity proceed, that if parties, who have entered into definite and distinct terms involving certain legal results, afterwards by their own act or with their own consent enter upon a course of negotiation which has the effect of leading one of the parties to suppose that the strict rights arising under the contract will not be enforced, or will be kept in suspense, or held in abeyance, the person who otherwise might have enforced those rights will not be allowed to enforce them when it would be inequitable having regard to the dealings which have taken place between the parties."

It is worth noticing that the principle may be applied, not only so as to suspend strict legal rights, but also so as to preclude the enforcement of them.

This principle has been applied to cases where a creditor agrees to accept a lesser sum in discharge of a greater. So much so that we can now say that, when a creditor and a debtor enter upon a course of negotiation, which leads the debtor to suppose that, on payment of the lesser sum, the creditor will not enforce payment of the balance, and on the faith thereof the debtor pays the lesser sum and the creditor accepts it as satisfaction: then the creditor will not be allowed to enforce payment of the balance when it would be inequitable to do so. This was well illustrated during the last war. Tenants went away to escape the bombs and left their houses unoccupied. The landlords accepted a reduced rent for the time they were empty. It was held that the landlords could not afterwards turn round and sue for the balance, see Central London Property Trust Ltd v High Trees House Ltd. This caused at the time some eyebrows to be raised in high places. But they have been lowered since. The solution was so obviously just that no one could well gainsay it.

In applying this principle, however, we must note the qualification: The creditor is only barred from his legal rights when it would be inequitable for him to insist upon them. Where there has been a true accord, under which the creditor voluntarily agrees to accept a lesser sum in satisfaction, and the debtor acts upon that accord by paying the lesser sum and the creditor accepts it, then it is inequitable for the creditor afterwards to insist on the balance. But he is not bound unless there has been truly an accord between them.

In the present case, on the facts as found by the judge, it seems to me that there was no true accord. The debtor's wife held the creditor to ransom. The creditor was in need of money to meet his own commitments, and she knew it. When the creditor asked for payment of the £480 due to him, she said to him in effect: "We cannot pay you the £480. But we will pay you £300 if you will accept it in settlement. If you do not accept it on those terms, you will get nothing. £300 is better than nothing." She had no right to say any such thing. She could properly have said: "We cannot pay you more than £300. Please accept it on account." But she had no right to insist on his taking it in settlement. When she said: "We will pay you nothing unless you accept £300 in settlement," she was putting undue pressure on the creditor. She was making a threat to break the contract (by paying nothing) and she was doing it so as to compel the creditor to do what he was unwilling to do (to accept £300 in settlement): and she succeeded. He complied with her demand. That was on recent authority a case of intimidation: see Rookes v. Barnard and Stratford (JT) & Son Ltd v Lindley. In these circumstances there was no true accord so as to found a defence of accord and satisfaction: see Day v McLea. There is also no equity in the defendant to warrant any departure from the due course of law. No person can insist on a settlement procured by intimidation.

In my opinion there is no reason in law or equity why the creditor should not enforce the full amount of the debt due to him. I would, therefore, dismiss this appeal.

== See also ==
- Collier v P & MJ Wright (Holdings) Ltd [2007] EWCA
