= Tom Denning, Baron Denning =

English lawyer and judge (1899–1999)

The Right Honourable The Lord Denning OM PC DL
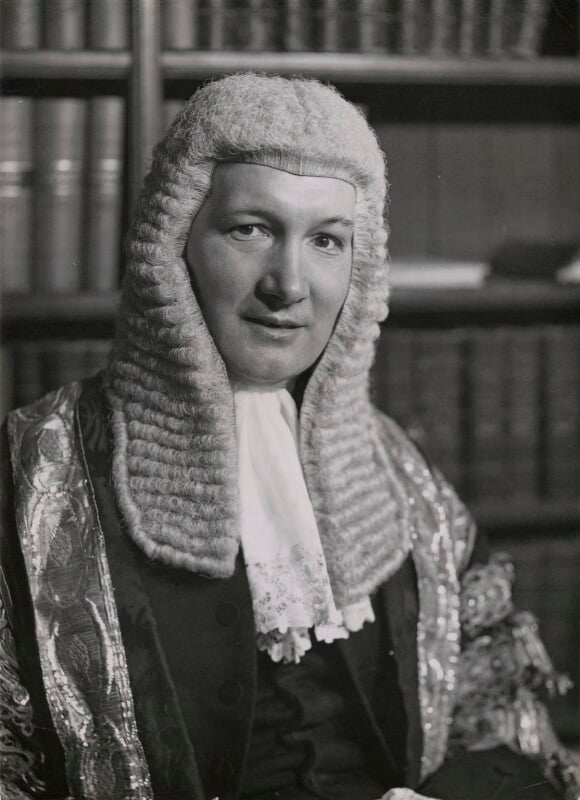
- Lord Denning in 1950

Master of the Rolls
- In office 19 April 1962 – 29 September 1982
- Preceded by: The Lord Evershed
- Succeeded by: The Lord Donaldson of Lymington

Lord of Appeal in Ordinary
- In office 24 April 1957 – 1962
- Preceded by: The Lord Oaksey
- Succeeded by: The Lord Evershed

Lord Justice of Appeal
- In office 12 October 1948 – 1957

Justice of the High Court
- In office 7 March 1944 – 1948

Personal details
- Born: Alfred Thompson Denning; 23 January 1899 Whitchurch, Hampshire
- Died: 5 March 1999 (aged 100) Royal Hampshire County Hospital, Winchester
- Spouses: Mary Harvey (m. 1932; died 1941); Joan Stuart (m. 1945; died 1992)
- Children: 1
- Education: Magdalen College, Oxford; Lincoln's Inn
- Profession: Barrister, judge

Alfred Thompson Denning, Baron Denning, OM, PC, DL (23 January 1899 – 5 March 1999), was an English barrister and judge. He was called to the Bar of England and Wales in 1923 and became a King's Counsel in 1938. Denning became a judge in 1944 when he was appointed to the Probate, Divorce and Admiralty Division of the High Court of Justice, and transferred to the King's Bench Division in 1945. He was made a Lord Justice of Appeal in 1948 after less than five years in the High Court. He became a Lord of Appeal in Ordinary in 1957 and after five years in the House of Lords returned to the Court of Appeal as Master of the Rolls in 1962, a position he held for 20 years. In retirement he wrote several books and continued to offer opinions on the state of the common law through his writing and his position in the House of Lords.

Margaret Thatcher said that Denning was "probably the greatest English judge of modern times". One of Lord Denning's successors as Master of the Rolls, Lord Bingham of Cornhill, called him "the best known and best loved judge in our history". Denning's appellate work in the Court of Appeal did not concern criminal law. Mark Garnett and Richard Weight argue that Denning was a conservative Christian who "remained popular with morally conservative Britons who were dismayed at the postwar rise in crime and who, like him, believed that the duties of the individual were being forgotten in the clamour for rights. He had a more punitive than redemptive view of criminal justice, as a result of which he was a vocal supporter of corporal and capital punishment." However, he changed his stance on capital punishment in later life.

Denning became one of the highest profile judges in England in part because of his report on the Profumo affair. He was known for his bold judgments running counter to the law at the time. During his 38-year career as a judge, he made large changes to the common law, particularly while in the Court of Appeal, and although some of his decisions were overturned by the House of Lords several of them were confirmed by Parliament, which passed statutes in line with his judgments. Appreciated for his role as "the people's judge" and his support for the individual, Denning attracted attention for his flexible and equitable attitude to the common law principle of precedent. He commented controversially about the Birmingham Six and Guildford Four.

== Early life and studies ==
Denning was born on 23 January 1899 in Whitchurch, Hampshire, to Charles Denning, a draper, and his wife Clara Denning (née Thompson). He was one of six children; his older brother Reginald Denning later became a staff officer with the British Army, and his younger brother Norman Denning became Director of Naval Intelligence and Deputy Chief of the Defence Staff (Intelligence). Denning was born two months earlier than expected and almost died at birth; he was so small and weak that he was nicknamed 'Tom Thumb' and could fit in a pint pot. He was named after Alfred the Great by his sister Marjorie, and was baptised on 23 April 1899 at All Hallows Church, Whitchurch.

Denning, along with his older brother Gordon, began his schooling at the National School of Whitchurch, one of many set up by the National Society for the Education of the Poor. Both boys won scholarships to Andover Grammar School, where Denning excelled academically, winning four prizes for English essays on the subjects of "The Great Authors", "Macaulay", "Carlyle" and "Milton". The outbreak of the First World War saw most of the schoolmasters leave to join the British armed forces, being replaced by female teachers. At the time Denning wanted to become a mathematician, but none of the new teachers knew enough mathematics to teach him; instead, he taught himself. He qualified to study at University College, Southampton, but was advised to stay at school and apply to Oxford or Cambridge in a few years. He sat the Oxbridge examination when he was 16 and was awarded a £30 a year exhibition to study mathematics at Magdalen College, Oxford; the money was not enough to live on, but he accepted nevertheless. Although he had been accepted by a college, he still needed to gain entry to the university as a whole, which meant passing exams, including Greek – which had not been taught at Andover Grammar School. Denning managed to teach himself enough of the subject to pass, and matriculated to Oxford in 1916.

In addition to his Magdalen Scholarship he gained a scholarship from Hampshire County Council worth £50 a year. After arriving he made a favourable impression on Sir Herbert Warren, the president of Magdalen College, who upgraded the exhibition to a Demyship of £80 a year and arranged for the Worshipful Company of Goldsmiths to give Denning a £30 a year scholarship. Despite military training in the early morning and evening, Denning worked hard at his studies, and obtained a First in Mathematical Moderations, the first half of his mathematics degree, in June 1917.

== War service ==
Denning was told he would be ineligible to serve in the Armed Forces because of a systolic heart murmur, which he believed the doctor diagnosed because he was tired of sending young men off to die. He successfully appealed against the decision, and enlisted on 14 August 1917 as a cadet in the Hampshire Regiment before being sent to the Royal Engineers Oxford University Officer Training Corps. He trained at Newark and was temporarily commissioned as a second lieutenant on 17 November 1917. Although he was old enough to serve in the armed forces, regulations meant that he was not allowed to serve in France until he was 19.

In March 1918, the German Army advanced closer to Amiens and Paris and Denning's unit was sent to France to help stop the advance. Under continuous shell fire for three months, the company and the 38th (Welsh) Infantry Division held their section of the line, with a unit under Denning's command building a bridge to allow infantry to advance over the River Ancre. Denning went two days without sleep while building these bridges; shortly after one was completed, a German aeroplane dropped a bomb on it, forcing them to start again. The unit advanced over the River Ancre and the Canal du Nord, but Denning fell ill with influenza and was in hospital for the last few days of the war. When writing of his experiences in World War I in The Family Story, Denning summed up his war service with characteristic pithiness in just four words: "I did my bit".

Denning's oldest brother, Captain John Edward Newdigate Denning, was killed near Gueudecourt on 26 September 1916 whilst serving with the Lincolnshire Regiment. His brother, Sub-Lieutenant Charles Gordon Denning, who saw action in the Battle of Jutland, died of tuberculosis on 24 May 1918 after serving with the Royal Navy on HMS Morris. Denning would describe his dead brothers as the best of him and his siblings.

== Return to Oxford ==
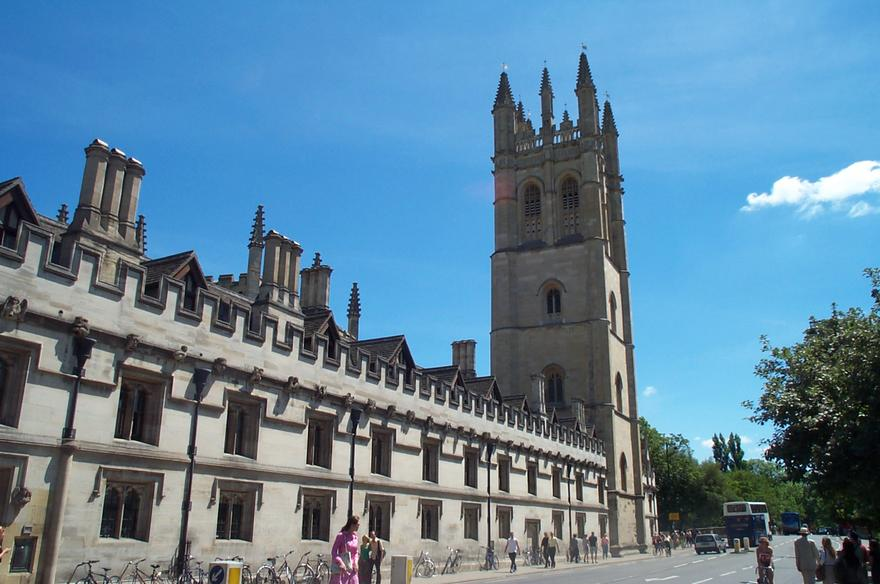
Magdalen College, Oxford, where Denning studied between 1916 and 1918, 1919 and 1920 and from 1921 to 1922

Denning was demobilised on 6 February 1919, and returned to Magdalen College four days later. He initially thought about turning to applied mathematics, but decided on pure mathematics. He studied hard, not participating in any of the university's numerous societies or clubs so that he could better focus on his work, and graduated in 1920, placing in the first class of the Mathematical Greats (the final undergraduate examinations for the subject). He was offered a job teaching mathematics at Winchester College for £350 a year, which he accepted. As well as mathematics, he taught geology, despite not having studied it; instead, he "read up on [it] the night before". He found the job boring, and after viewing the Assize Court at Winchester Castle decided he would like to be a barrister.

On the advice of Herbert Warren, he returned to Magdalen to study Jurisprudence in October 1921. Thanks to Warren, Denning was elected to the Eldon Law Scholarship, worth £100 a year, to finance his studies; when the news of Denning's election was brought, Warren wrote "you are a marked man. Perhaps you will be a Lord of Appeal some day". Denning took his final examinations in June 1922 and impressed the examiner, Geoffrey Cheshire, by correctly answering questions on the Law of Property Act which had been given Royal Assent only a few days before.

Denning gained a high grade in all his subjects except jurisprudence, which he described as "too abstract a subject for my liking". He did not return to read for a Bachelor of Civil Law (BCL) but instead attempted to gain a prize fellowship at All Souls College; he failed to be accepted, something he put down to his poor pronunciation of Latin.

== The Bar ==
Denning was admitted to Lincoln's Inn on 4 November 1921, choosing it because the Under Treasurer was a graduate of Magdalen College. On the advice of his brother's friend Frank Merriman he applied to 4 Brick Court, Middle Temple, a small set of chambers run by Henry O'Hagan. He was accepted and began work there in September 1922, before he had taken his final bar exam. He finished his final exam in May 1923 and came top in the bar examination, with the Inn awarding him a 100 guineas a year studentship of three years. He was called to the Bar on 13 June 1923, and was offered a tenancy by O'Hagan. His first few years were spent receiving small briefs from clients, including work prosecuting those who failed to pay rail tickets and fines. During this time, he also wrote a manual for the railway police giving guidance on incidents such as taxi drivers who refused to take a customer to a destination within the area specified by the Public Carriage Office (which they were legally obliged to do). He wrote his first article in 1924 titled "Quantum meruit and the Statute of Frauds" on the decision in Scott v Pattison [1923] 2 KB 723; it was accepted by the Law Quarterly Review and published in January 1925.

His work steadily increased in amount and quality throughout the 1920s and 1930s. By the 1930s, he was making most of his court appearances in the senior courts such as the High Court of Justice; in 1932 he was advised by his clerk that he should not be seen in the county courts, and that he should leave this work for lesser members of the chambers. In 1929, he helped edit several chapters of Smith's Leading Cases (13th ed.) and in 1932 acted as a supervising editor for the 9th edition of Bullen & Leake's Precedents for Pleadings in the King's Bench Division. In 1932, he moved to his own set of chambers in Brick Court, and by 1936 he was earning over £3,000 a year (roughly £200,000 a year in 2020). A significant case was L'Estrange v F Graucob Ltd [1934] 2 KB 394, where he successfully argued an exemption clause was incorporated because a contract was signed. He said that "If you are an advocate you want your client to win. If you are a judge you don't care who wins exactly. All you are concerned about is justice."

From 1937 until 1944, he was Chancellor of the Diocese of Southwark, and from 1942 to 1944 was Chancellor of the Diocese of London. He applied to become a King's Counsel on 15 January 1938. The appointments were announced on 7 April; he "took silk" on 9 April and received letters of congratulation from, among others, Rayner Goddard. After the start of the Second World War, Denning volunteered; he was too old for active service, and was instead appointed legal advisor to the North East Region. In 1941, he acted for the respondent in the case of Hoani te Heuheu vs Aotea District Maori Land Board [1941] AC 308, an important New Zealand constitutional case before the Privy Council, which held that treaty duties (specifically, the Treaty of Waitangi) could be legally enforced only when they are incorporated into Acts of Parliament. In 1942, Denning took the case of Gold v Essex County Council [1942] 2 KB 293, which changed the law to make hospitals liable for the professional negligence of their staff.

In December 1943, a judge was taken ill, and Denning was asked to take his place as a Commissioner of Assize. This was regarded as a 'trial' for membership of the judiciary, and Denning was appointed Recorder of Plymouth on 17 February 1944. On 6 March 1944, while arguing a case in the House of Lords, Denning was taken aside by the Lord Chancellor and told that he wanted Denning to become a judge at the High Court of Justice in the Probate, Divorce and Admiralty Division. Denning accepted, and the announcement was made before the conclusion of the appeal.

== High Court ==
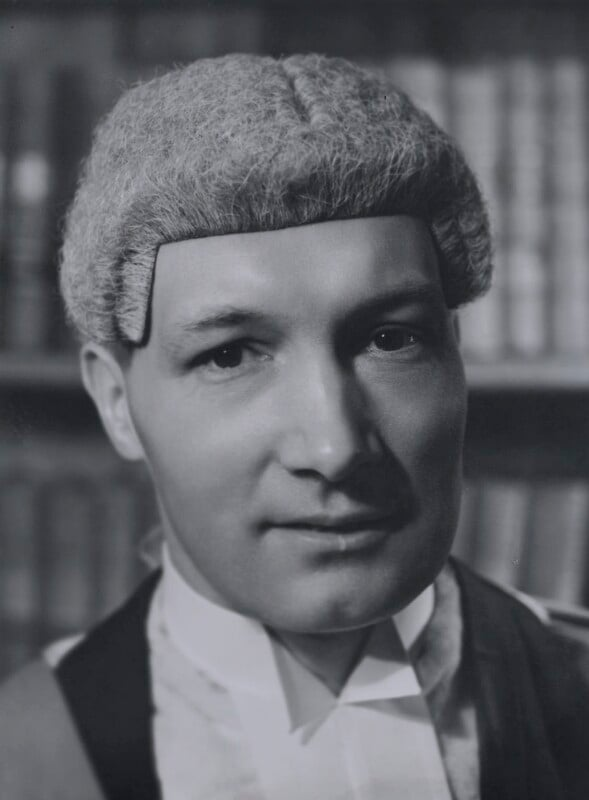
Denning in 1947

Denning was officially appointed on 7 March 1944 with a salary of £5,000, and received the customary knighthood on 15 March 1944. After becoming a judge Denning was also elected a Bencher of Lincoln's Inn, and became its treasurer in 1964. Denning had little experience with divorce law and disliked it; it was seen as an inferior type of law. There were few good barristers specialising in divorce law; two other barristers were sworn into the Probate, Divorce and Admiralty Division along with Denning, and of the three only one had ever practiced divorce law. His work as a divorce judge was relatively sound; his decisions were overturned only once, in Churchman v Churchman [1945] 2 All ER 190.

With the appointment of Lord Jowitt as Lord Chancellor in 1945, Denning was transferred to the King's Bench Division, where Jowitt thought his talents would be better put to use (with Hildreth Glyn-Jones QC, later a High Court judge, greeting him with the words "welcome home").

In 1946, he travelled the Western Circuit but was recalled by the Lord Chancellor to chair a committee looking at the reform of procedure in divorce cases. He continued working as a judge while chairing the daily committee. The committee was appointed on 26 June 1946 and published its first report in July, which reduced the time between decree nisi and decree absolute from 6 months to 6 weeks. The second report was published in November, recommending that County Court judges should be appointed to try cases, and the final report was published in February 1947 recommending the establishment of a Marriage Welfare Service. The reports were well received by the public and led to Denning being invited in 1949 to become President of the National Marriage Guidance Council.

His appointment to the King's Bench Division allowed him to hear pension appeals, and he attempted to reform the principles applied by the government minister and the Pensions Tribunals. In Starr v Ministry of Pensions [1946] 1 KB 345 he ruled that it was up to the tribunals to prove that an injury was not due to war service, reversing the previous state of affairs where a claimant would have to prove their injuries were due to war service before they would be granted a pension. In James v Minister of Pensions [1947] KB 867 he also allowed for judges to approve time extensions for the claimant to gather more evidence when such extensions had been rejected by the Tribunal. These two cases made a large difference to applicants, and he received praise from both the British Legion and the public.

The government refused to do anything about those servicemen who had been rejected by the courts prior to Denning's judgment, which provoked public outcry under the slogan "Fit for Service, Fit for Pension". The British Legion chose 73 cases and asked Denning to let the Legion present them while the courts were not sitting; Denning heard all 73 cases on 11 July 1946.

In 1947, he decided in Central London Property Trust Ltd v High Trees House Ltd [1947] KB 130 (known as the High Trees case), which was a milestone in English contract law. It resurrected the principle of promissory estoppel established in Hughes v Metropolitan Railway Co (1876–77) LR 2 App Cas 439 and has been both praised and criticised by lawyers and legal theorists.

As a High Court judge Denning sentenced people to death, which he said at the time "didn't worry [him] in the least". Denning maintained that for murder, death was the most appropriate penalty, and that in cases where mistakes had been made there was always an appeals system. In the 1950s there was growing opposition to the use of the death penalty, and a Royal Commission was appointed to investigate abolishing it. Denning told the Commission in 1953 that "the punishment inflicted for grave crimes should adequately reflect the revulsion felt by the great majority of citizens for them".

He later changed his mind about capital punishment, regarding it as unethical. In 1984, he wrote "Is it right for us, as a society, to do a thing – hang a man – which none of us individually would be prepared to do or even witness? The answer is 'no, not in a civilised society'."

== Court of Appeal ==
After less than five years as a judge, Denning was appointed a Lord Justice of Appeal on 14 October 1948. He was sworn in as a Privy Counsellor on 25 October 1948. As a Lord Justice of Appeal, he continued to make reforming judgments in a variety of areas, particularly in family law and the rights of deserted wives. In Bendall v McWhirter [1952] 2 QB 466 he ruled that a deserted wife occupying the marital home had a personal licence to stay there. The decision provoked disapproval among the judiciary and from the public; a correspondent wrote:

Dear Sir: You are a disgrace to all mankind to let these women break up homes and expect us chaps to keep them while they rob us of what we have worked for and put us out on the street. I only hope you have the same trouble as us. So do us all a favour and take a Rolls and run off Beachy Head and don't come back.

This was effectively nullified with the case National Provincial Bank Ltd v Ainsworth [1965] AC 1175 in 1965, which ruled that the deserted wife had no licence to stay. The decision was very unpopular and led to the passing of the Matrimonial Homes Act 1967. Much of his work in favour of the deserted wife was based around his interpretation of the Married Women's Property Act 1882, which the House of Lords unanimously overruled in Pettitt v Pettitt [1970] AC 777 in 1970. Further notable decisions by Denning in this area were Heseltine v Heseltine [1971] 1 WLR 342 in 1971 and Wachtel v Wachtel [1973] Fam 72 in 1973, which created basic rules for dividing family assets in a divorce case, something which had not previously been established in the law.

In 1951, he gave a significant dissenting judgment in the case Candler v Crane, Christmas & Co, regarded as a "brilliant advancement to the law of negligent misstatements" and which was later approved of by the House of Lords in Hedley Byrne & Co Ltd v Heller & Partners Ltd [1963] 2 All ER 575. In Combe v Combe in 1952 he elaborated on his resurrected doctrine of promissory estoppel, saying that it could be a "shield" not a "sword"; it could be used to defend a claim, but not to create a cause of action where none existed. In 1954, his decision in Roe v Minister of Health [1954] 2 AER 131 altered the grounds on which hospital staff could be found negligent, a legal precedent he himself had set in Gold v Essex County Council in 1942. In 1955, his leading judgment in Entores Ltd v Miles Far East Corporation [1955] 2 QB 327 implemented a way to judge the moment of acceptance in an instantaneous or near-instantaneous method of communication; like the High Trees case it is still valid.

== House of Lords ==
After the resignation of Lord Oaksey in 1956, Denning was offered a job as a Law Lord. After a period of contemplation (he worried that such an appointment would reduce his chances of becoming Master of the Rolls or Lord Chief Justice) he accepted, and was formally offered the job on 5 April 1957. He was appointed on 24 April 1957, as Baron Denning, of Whitchurch in the County of Southampton; for the supporters of his coat of arms he chose Lord Mansfield and Sir Edward Coke. Many members of the judiciary and the Bar approved of his appointment, but he was warned that he should move slowly to reform the court.

Denning did not enjoy his time in the House of Lords and clashed frequently with Gavin, Viscount Simonds, who was known as a conservative and orthodox judge. Despite his reputation as a fiercely individual judge, Denning dissented in only 16% of cases he heard in the House of Lords; fewer than Lord Keith, who dissented 22% of the time. On 9 May 1960, Denning was appointed a Deputy Lieutenant of Sussex.

== Master of the Rolls ==
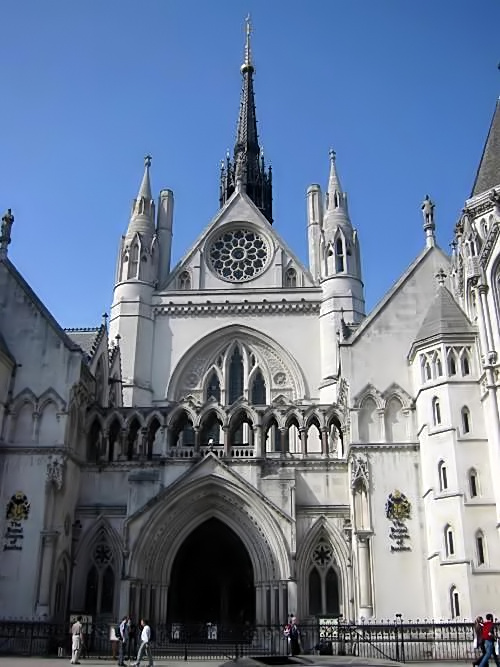
The Royal Courts of Justice, where Denning sat between 1944 and 1956 in the High Court and Court of Appeal and again from 1962 to 1982 as Master of the Rolls

In 1962, Lord Evershed resigned as Master of the Rolls, and Denning was appointed to replace him on 19 April 1962 with a salary of £9,000. Although Denning himself described it as "a step down" he was pleased with his appointment, as he had much preferred his time with the Court of Appeal than the House of Lords. Court of Appeal judges sit in threes, and the Lords in fives (or more), so it was suggested that to get his way in the Court of Appeal Denning only had to persuade one other judge whereas in the House of Lords it was at least two. The other "benefit" of the Court of Appeal is that it hears more cases than the House of Lords, and so has a greater effect on the law. During his 20 years as Master of the Rolls, Denning could choose both which cases he heard, and the judges with whom he sat. Therefore, on most issues, he effectively had the last word; comparatively few cases went on to the House of Lords, which was at that time Britain's highest court of law.

As Master of the Rolls he selected cases he felt to be particularly important to hear and, rather than having an American system (where judges had a rota for taking cases), assigned cases to those judges who had expertise in that particular area of law. In 1963, he chaired a committee investigating ways to reduce the archive of legal documents kept by the Public Record Office; by that point the files for civil cases of the High Court alone occupied four miles of shelving. The final report was presented to the Lord Chancellor on 16 May 1966, with the conclusion being that "if our proposals are implemented the Public Record Office alone will be relieved of two hundred tons of records (occupying 15,000 feet of shelving)". The Lord Chancellor took Denning's report to heart, and had the changes he recommended implemented immediately.

=== Contract law ===
Denning gave the leading judgment in D & C Builders Ltd v Rees [1965] 2 QB 617 in 1965. D & C Builders Ltd (the respondent) had been hired by Rees (the appellant) to do some construction work at his shop, where he sold building materials. The respondent finished the work and repeatedly phoned the appellant to request the money they were owed. After three phone calls spread out over several months the appellant's wife spoke to the respondents; she said there were several problems with the work that they had done, and she would only pay £300 of the £482 owed. The respondents replied that £300 would barely cover the costs of the materials, but that they would accept it anyway. If the respondents had not received the money they would have gone bankrupt, something the appellant's wife was well aware of. In his judgment, Denning modified English case law on part payment and accord and satisfaction, saying that the rules on part payment can be set aside in situations where one of the parties is under duress. The fact that D & C Builders were effectively forced into accepting the lesser amount meant that the payment was not valid.

In Thornton v Shoe Lane Parking Ltd [1971] 2 QB 163 in 1971 the Court of Appeal under Denning ruled that when dealing with offer and acceptance between a person and an automated machine the offer was made by the machine.

=== Tort law ===
Denning gave the leading judgment in Letang v Cooper [1964] 2 All ER 929 in 1964. Mrs Letang, on holiday in Cornwall, decided to lie down and rest in grass outside a hotel. Cooper drove into the hotel car park and, not seeing Letang, ran over her legs. More than three years after the events, Letang brought a tort case against Cooper, claiming damages for her injuries. The standard tort for personal injuries is that of negligence, which has a three-year statute of limitations, and Letang instead claimed damages under the tort of trespass to the person. In his judgment, Denning stated that the tort of trespass could only be used if the injury was inflicted intentionally; if it was unintentionally, only negligence could be used.

In Spartan Steel and Alloys Ltd v. Martin & Co. Ltd [1973] 1 QB 27 in 1973 he delivered a leading judgment on the subject of the recovery of pure economic loss in negligence. Spartan Steel were a company that manufactured stainless steel in Birmingham, and their factory was powered by electricity. Less than a mile away from the factory, Martin & Co were doing maintenance work on a road when they accidentally unearthed and damaged the power cable providing the factory with electricity. Due to the power being off, the factory lost a large amount of money; £368 on damaged goods, £400 on the profits they would have made from those goods and £1,767 for the steel they could not make due to the power outage. The question was what Spartan Steel could claim money for. Martin & Co agreed they were negligent, and offered to pay for the damaged goods and the profit that Spartan Steel would have made on those goods, but refused to pay damages for the steel Spartan Steel could not make due to the power outage. In his judgment, Denning agreed that they would only have to pay for losses associated with the damaged goods, not the money lost on the steel that could not be made due to the power outage because it counted as pure economic loss. For public policy reasons, Denning would not allow the recovery of pure economic loss, stating in his judgment that:

1. Statutory utility providers are never liable for damages caused by their negligence.
2. A blackout is a common hazard and a risk which everyone can be expected to tolerate from time to time.
3. If claims for pure economic loss in such cases were allowed, it might lead to countless claims, some of which may be spurious.
4. It would be unfair to place the entire weight of many comparatively small losses upon the shoulders of one person in such cases.
5. The law does not leave the claimant without remedy by allowing him to recover the economic losses that are directly consequential upon physical damage.

The Court of Appeal's decision in Spartan Steel has been criticised, firstly for being based on public policy rather than any legal principle, and secondly because the main public policy ground for their decision (that allowing claims of pure economic loss would lead to countless claims) has never been backed up by evidence. The House of Lords eventually ruled in Junior Books v Veitchi [1982] 3 All ER 201 that pure economic loss was recoverable.

=== The Profumo affair ===
Denning delivered a report into the Profumo affair. John Profumo was the Secretary of State for War with the British government. At a party in 1961, Profumo was introduced to Christine Keeler, a showgirl, and began having an affair with her. At the same time, she was in a relationship with Yevgeni Ivanov, a naval attaché at the embassy of the Soviet Union. On 26 January 1963, Keeler was contacted by police on an unrelated matter and voluntarily gave them information about her relationship with Profumo.

The police did not initially investigate; no crime had been committed, and the morals of ministers were not their concern. Although the relationship lasted only a few weeks it became public knowledge in 1962. Keeler attempted to publish her memoirs in the Sunday Pictorial in January 1963 but Profumo, still insisting that he had done nothing wrong, forced them to back down with threats of legal action should the story be published.

Profumo made a statement in the House of Commons on 22 March, saying that "there was no impropriety whatsoever in my acquaintanceship with Miss Keeler". On 4 June 1963, he contacted the Chief Whip and the prime minister's private secretary and informed them that he had indeed been having an affair with Keeler; therefore, he sent a letter of resignation to the prime minister, which was accepted.

On 21 June 1963, Harold Macmillan, the prime minister at the time, asked Denning to lead an enquiry into the "circumstances leading to the resignation of the former Secretary of State for War, Mr J. D. Profumo". He started work on 24 June and began speaking to witnesses a day later. This period of the inquiry took 49 days and involved his speaking to 160 people. He concluded that the primary responsibility for the scandal was with Profumo, for associating with Keeler and for lying to his colleagues, with the greatest error being his false statement in the House of Commons.

He also said that the situation had been looked at in the wrong way by police, members of parliament and the security services; rather than asking if Profumo had committed adultery they should have asked if his conduct had led ordinary people to believe he committed adultery. His analogy was with divorce law; a man does not need to have committed adultery for his wife to have grounds to divorce him, but rather she simply has to believe that he has committed adultery. This is because such a belief would destroy the trust and confidence within the relationship. This brought criticism from several government ministers including Sir John Hobson, the Attorney General for England and Wales, saying that it would mean condemning a man on the basis of suspicion rather than evidence.

Denning's final report was 70,000 words long and was completed in the summer of 1963. He signed it on 16 September and it was published ten days later. It was a best-seller; 105,000 copies were sold, 4,000 in the first hour, with people queuing outside Her Majesty's Stationery Office to buy copies. The full report was published in The Daily Telegraph as a supplement and was described as "the raciest and most readable Blue Book ever published".

The report was criticised as a "whitewash", a claim Denning rejected; he said that "while the public interest demands that the facts should be ascertained as completely as possible there is a higher interest to be considered, namely the interest of justice to the individual which overrides all others".

=== Children's rights ===
In 1969, Denning heard the case of Hewer v Bryant which related to the rights of those under 18 to act on their own behalf. In this case, Denning rejected the concept of absolute parental control over someone under 18, and established it as a 'dwindling right'.

the legal right of a parent to the custody of a child… is a dwindling right which the courts will hesitate to enforce against the wishes of the child, and the more so the older he is. It starts with a right of control and ends with little more than advice

— Lord Denning

This judgment was subsequently cited in the landmark case of Gillick v West Norfolk and Wisbech Area Health Authority which remains the definitive case on children's rights, with leading judge for that case, Lord Fraser saying that he agreed "with every word" of Denning's ruling.

=== Admiralty court ===
Denning sat as an Admiralty court judge. In fact he was one of the leading justiciars in Admiralty court of the late 20th century. For example, he decided the Hansa Nord case Cehave v Bremer in 1976; this case demonstrated the continued pre-eminence of London as the legal centre of the high seas even although the sun was setting on the British Empire.

=== National security ===
In 1977, Denning upheld the deportation of Mark Hosenball, a journalist who had worked on a story which referred to the existence of GCHQ, which was considered to be a state secret. In the ruling, he argued that the government's decisions in these cases were beyond legal review, writing:

There is a conflict here between the interests of national security on the one hand and the freedom of the individual on the other. The balance between these two is not for a court of law. It is for the Home Secretary. He is the person entrusted by Parliament with the task. In some parts of the world national security has on occasions been used as an excuse for all sorts of infringements of individual liberty. But not in England.

=== Illness and controversy ===
In 1979, he began to experience hip and leg problems; one of his legs had shortened an inch and a half and he had to learn to walk again.

In the Union of Post Office Workers's anti-apartheid boycott of postal services to and from South Africa, The Freedom Association sought an injunction to prevent the boycott. Denning granted a temporary injunction, and years later wrote of "bad workers" (who joined the boycott) and "good workers" (who worked normally).

In 1980, during an appeal by the Birmingham Six (who were later acquitted), Denning judged that the men should be stopped from challenging legal decisions. He listed several reasons for not allowing their appeal:

Just consider the course of events if their action were to proceed to trial ... If the six men failed it would mean that much time and money and worry would have been expended by many people to no good purpose. If they won, it would mean that the police were guilty of perjury; that they were guilty of violence and threats; that the confessions were involuntary and improperly admitted in evidence; and that the convictions were erroneous. ... That was such an appalling vista that every sensible person would say, "It cannot be right that these actions should go any further."

In 1982, he published What Next in the Law; in it, he seemed to suggest that "British citizens were no longer all qualified to serve on juries", that some members of the black community were unsuitable to serve on juries and that immigrant groups may have had different moral standards to native Englishmen.

The English are no longer a homogeneous race. They are white and black, coloured and brown. They no longer share the same standards of conduct. Some of them come from countries where bribery and graft are accepted as an integral part of life and where stealing is a virtue so long as you are not found out ... They will never accept the word of a policeman against one of their own.

In the book, he claimed that, in a trial over the St Pauls riot in Bristol, which resulted in an acquittal, the jury split down racial lines. Two jurors on the case threatened to sue him and the Society of Black Lawyers wrote to the Lord Chancellor to request that Denning "politely and firmly" be made to retire. The book was withdrawn and re-published with the passages removed.

On 5 July, George Thomas held a dinner in Denning's honour at the Speaker's House. Attending were Margaret Thatcher, Robert Runcie, Lord Hailsham of St Marylebone, Geoffrey Howe, Lord Lane, Willie Whitelaw, Michael Havers, and Christopher Leaver. On 30 July 1982, his last day in court, Denning prepared four judgments and, dressed in his official robes and in the company of the Lord Chief Justice, delivered his farewell speech to over 300 lawyers crowded into the court. He delivered his last judgment on 29 September in George Mitchell (Chesterhall) Ltd v Finney Lock Seeds Ltd [1983] 2 AC 803 and, characteristically, dissented, though the House of Lords would later unanimously uphold his dissent.

== Retirement and death ==
In retirement, Denning removed to Whitchurch and continued the work he had done outside court hours, lecturing and presenting awards. He also on occasion dispensed legal advice; in February 1983, he advised Patrick Evershed on the statutory duties of water suppliers. Further hip troubles were resolved with a full replacement in March 1983, although a fall later that year forced him to stay at home for six weeks. With free time on his hands Denning spoke in the House of Lords on matters that interested him, supporting an amendment to the Abortion Act 1967 and bills designed to allow the administration of companies in financial difficulties. During debates on the Local Government Act 1986 about the Section 28, Denning boasted of having sentenced men to prison for "the abominable offence of buggery", warning that "we must not allow this cult of homosexuality, making it equal with heterosexuality, to develop in our land." Four years later he opposed homosexuality among judges, claiming it would result in blackmail and improper relations with barristers.

In 1983, he published the final volume of his autobiography The Closing Chapter and a year later published Landmarks in the Law. His final book titled Leaves from my Library was published in 1986; it was a collection of his favourite pieces of prose, and was subtitled "An English Anthology". He appeared in an episode of the children's television programme Jim'll Fix It, helping to grant a thirteen-year-old girl's wish to be a barrister for a day. By 1989, his health was failing; he was suffering from dizzy spells, and after falling from a train at Waterloo station he was advised he should not visit London again unless he was driven.

In the summer of 1990, he agreed to a taped interview with A. N. Wilson, to be published in The Spectator. They discussed the Guildford Four; Denning remarked that if the Guildford Four had been hanged "They'd probably have hanged the right men. Just not proved against them, that's all". His remarks were controversial and came at a time when the issue of miscarriage of justice was a sensitive topic. He had expressed a similar controversial opinion regarding the Birmingham Six in 1988, saying: "Hanging ought to be retained for murder most foul. We shouldn't have all these campaigns to get the Birmingham Six released if they'd been hanged. They'd have been forgotten, and the whole community would be satisfied ... It is better that some innocent men remain in jail than that the integrity of the English judicial system be impugned."

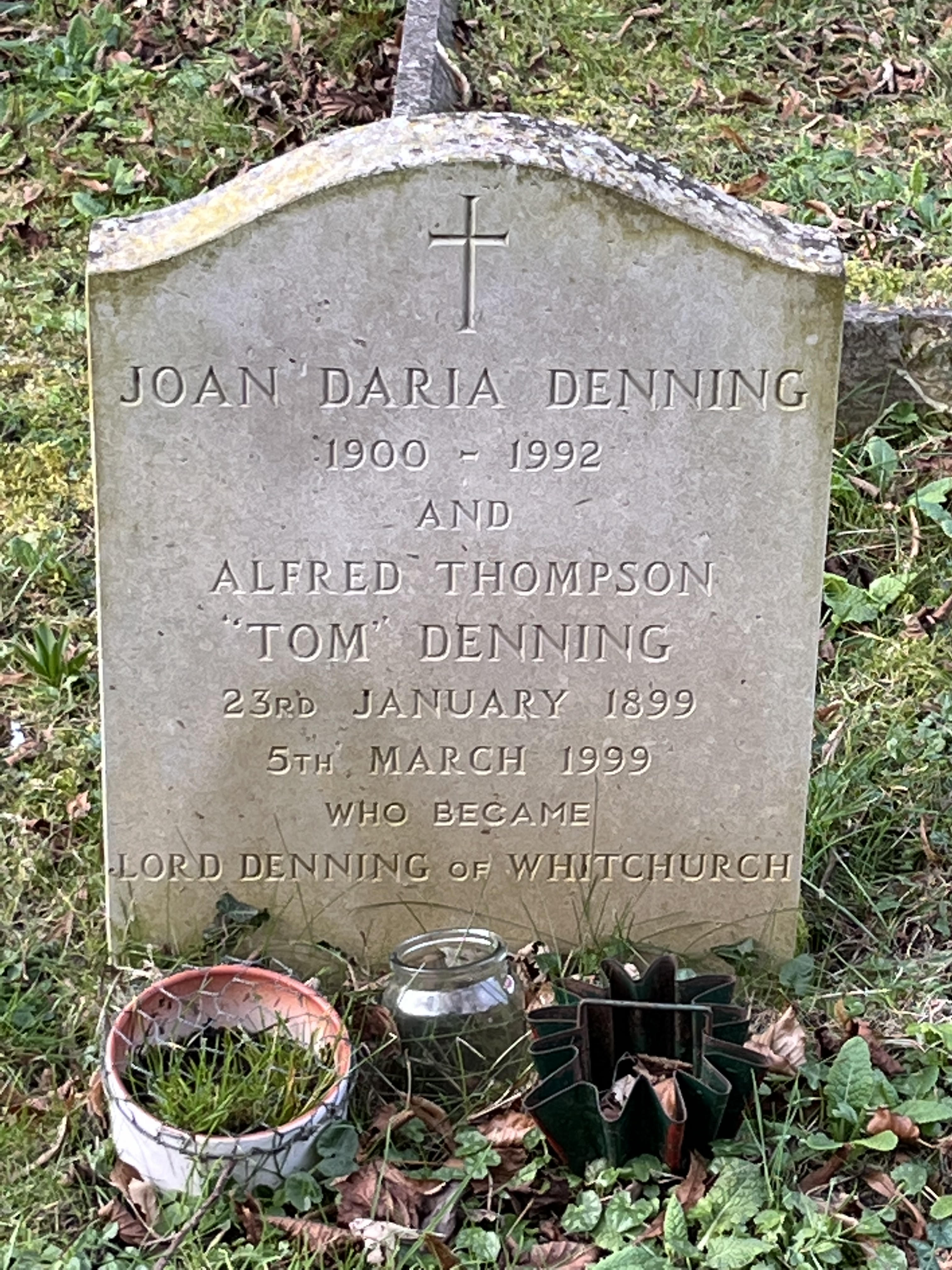
Grave of Denning and his wife Joan in Whitchurch Cemetery, Hampshire

In the same article, according to Wilson, "Denning the Europhobe told me that it was 'entirely wrong' for this country to have put its interests in Europe into the hands of 'a German Jew, if you please' called Leon Brittan. When I questioned the accuracy of this description of Sir Leon, Denning reaffirmed it: 'Look him up – you'll see he was a German Jew.'" Leon Brittan was, in fact, born in England, the child of Lithuanian immigrants. Denning appeared on a radio programme aimed at the Jewish community to apologise, saying that Jewish refugees from Hitler's Germany had contributed a great deal in the fields of science, culture, art, law and music, and that "I'd like to express my gratitude to those of that origin who came and have done so much for England."

On 25 November 1997, he was appointed to the Order of Merit; by this point he was too weak to travel to London to receive it, so instead a representative of the Queen travelled to Whitchurch to present it to him.

He celebrated his 100th birthday in Whitchurch on 23 January 1999, receiving telegrams from both the Queen and Queen Mother. A male choir sang "Happy Birthday to You" and the local church had a new bell named "Great Tom" cast in his honour specifically for the occasion. By this point his health had deteriorated even further; he was legally blind and required a hearing aid. On 5 March 1999 he fell ill and was rushed to Royal Hampshire County Hospital, where he died of an internal haemorrhage.

Denning was buried in his home town of Whitchurch, in the local churchyard. A memorial service was held at Westminster Abbey on 17 June 1999; among the tributes received, one was from the Lord Chief Justice Lord Bingham of Cornhill, who described Denning as "the best-known and best loved judge in our history".

== Other work ==
As well as his work as a barrister and judge, Denning was involved in supporting student law societies and other groups; at various times he was Vice-President of Queen's University Belfast Law Society and a patron of the Legal Research Foundation, the United Law Clerks' Society and the Commonwealth Legal Education Association. He also spent time as the vice-president of the Society of Genealogists, Honorary President of the Council for the Protection of Rural England and Honorary President of the Glasgow University Dialectic Society. From 1950 he acted as an administrator and fund-raiser for Cumberland Lodge. After being made aware of the Le Court charity for invalid ex-servicemen by Geoffrey Cheshire, Denning became the chairman of the organisation in 1952. In 1953, he was elected President of Birkbeck College, University of London and on 18 March presented the 1952 Haldane Memorial Lecture on the subject of the rule of law and the welfare state. In 1964, he was made President of the English Association in recognition of his contributions to English prose. He became Chairman of the Historical Manuscripts Commission in 1962, resigning in December 1982.

In 1949, he gave the inaugural Hamlyn Lectures at the Senate House, University of London under the title Freedom under the Law. The success of these lectures led to his being invited to speak at many more events; in early 1950 he spoke at University College, Dublin and in June spoke at the Holdsworth Club meeting at Birmingham University. In February 1953 he gave a speech on 'the need for a new equity' to the Bentham Club at University College London, and in May gave the thirty-third Earl Grey Memorial Lecture at King's College, University of Durham (now, part of Newcastle University), on the influence of religion on law. Towards the end of his judicial career he gave the 1980 Richard Dimbleby Lecture on the subject of "Misuse of Power".

In addition to being a Bencher of Lincoln's Inn in 1944 he was made an Honorary Bencher of Middle Temple in 1972, Gray's Inn in 1979 and Inner Temple in 1982, making him the only person to be elected a Bencher or Honorary Bencher of all four Inns of Court. In 1963, he was made a Doctor of Civil Law by the University of Oxford. In 1977, he was awarded with an honorary doctorate in the Netherlands, by Tilburg Law School, part of Tilburg University. He was appointed a Deputy Lieutenant of Hampshire on 2 June 1978.

== Overseas travels ==
Throughout his career, Denning travelled abroad to lecture and learn more about other legal systems. In 1954, he was sponsored by the Nuffield Foundation to travel to South Africa and visit the universities there in the court holiday. He visited all six universities, accompanied by his son Robert and wife Joan, lecturing on the role of the judiciary and the press in safeguarding freedom. In 1955, he travelled to the United States at the behest of the American Bar Association and was elected an honorary member, followed by a trip to Canada a year later as a guest of the Canadian Bar Association, where he was awarded an honorary law doctorate by the University of Ottawa and made a life member of the Canadian Bar Association. In 1958, he visited Israel and from there travelled to Poland, where he was surprised by both the number of female judges and how badly they were paid. In 1961, he travelled again to Israel to give the Lionel Cohen Lecture at the Hebrew University of Jerusalem.

In January 1964, Denning and his wife Joan travelled to India and Pakistan, visiting cities such as Madras (now Chennai) and Jaipur, meeting eminent jurists and speaking with Jawaharlal Nehru. He again visited Canada and the United States in the long vacation of 1964 and addressed a full conference hall in New York. On 14 August 1965, he and his wife flew to South America for a month-long tour of the continent sponsored by the British Council. The couple visited Brazil, Uruguay, Argentina, Chile and Peru before flying north to visit Mexico City. On 6 January 1966, the couple flew to Malta, where Denning spoke at legal conferences and lectures. In the same year, they flew to San Francisco, Fiji and finally to New Zealand to take part in the law conference at Dunedin, New Zealand. His lecture at the conference so impressed an Australian visitor that he was invited in 1967 to speak at the Australian Law Society annual conference. On the return home, the couple briefly stayed in Delhi, where they gave a dinner for members of the Indian Bar who had welcomed them during their visit in 1964. In 1968, they again visited Canada, and Denning was given an honorary degree by McGill University. In 1969, he again travelled to India, this time on an official visit with Elwyn Jones and Sir John Widgery.

In August 1969, he travelled to Fiji to arbitrate in a dispute between a majority of Fijian sugarcane growers and the Australian owners of the refining mills, which he was permitted to do on the condition he did not take a fee. Denning refused to have any contact with the government as a way to emphasise his neutrality in the situation. The agreements between growers and millers had been based on a contract written in 1961 due to end in March 1970. The growers were convinced that they were getting a bad deal; in response to their demand for better terms the mill-owners threatened to leave Fiji. Despite criticism from both sides at the beginning of the arbitration process, Denning came up with a solution which redressed matters in favour of growers, creating a new formula for working out prices and requiring that the mill owners have an accountant inspect their accounts and report back to the growers. Denning's decision impressed the Foreign and Commonwealth Office, who invited him to report on the banana growing industry in Jamaica in the vacation of 1971. His foreign travels to lecture on English law led to him being described as the "Ambassador-at-Large for the common law".

== Judicial style ==
Denning was known for his excellent memory, repeating notes almost verbatim in his exams at Oxford and on one occasion identifying the exact book, page and paragraph of text in a judgment that covered a particular situation. As a judge he attempted to make his decisions and the law publicly understandable, believing that the public would not want to follow the law unless they believed and understood that it was just. In his cases, he referred to the parties by name in his judgments rather than as "plaintiff" and "defendant" and used short sentences and a "storytelling" style of speech shown in the case Beswick v Beswick where his judgment started:

Old Peter Beswick was a coal merchant in Eccles, Lancashire. He had no business premises. All he had was a lorry, scales, and weights. He used to take the lorry to the yard of the National Coal Board, where he bagged coal and took it round to his customers in the neighbourhood. His nephew, John Joseph Beswick, helped him in his business. In March 1962, old Peter Beswick and his wife were both over 70. He had had his leg amputated and was not in good health. The nephew was anxious to get hold of the business before the old man died. So they went to a solicitor, Mr. Ashcroft, who drew up an agreement for them.

In court, Denning preferred to let counsel talk on for as long as they wanted to so that he could get a grasp of the situation without wading through irrelevant court papers; to prevent them going on too long he sat quietly and allowed them to wind down at their own pace.

Denning was also known for his long working schedule; when he served as Master of the Rolls he sat for five full days a week, and required reserved judgments (about one case in ten) to be written during the weekend. He expected the other justices to keep to the same schedule as himself, and was repeatedly warned about overwork. Fellow judge Stephen Henn-Collins wrote him a poem:

My brother pray be warned by me
And always rise in time for tea
And when you feel you must sit late
Remember my untoward fate
Don't go on sitting until seven
But sit next morning at eleven

Unlike most of the judiciary, Denning firmly believed that the press should have access to the courts and freedom to criticise magistrates and judges. He believed all legal proceedings should be held in public, quoting Jeremy Bentham when he said that "in the darkness of secrecy all sorts of things can go wrong. If things are really done in public you can see that the judge does behave himself, the newspapers can comment on it if he misbehaves – it keeps everyone in order".

For many years, Denning was the president of the Lawyers' Christian Fellowship, and he once wrote that "Without religion there is no morality, and without morality there is no law." His Christian beliefs sometimes affected his judgments, particularly on the subject of the sanctity of marriage. In Re L (infants) he reversed a decision to give the children of a couple to the wife in a divorce case, believing that should the wife get custody of the children there would be no chance of saving the marriage.

Denning's style was consistently unique and regularly discussed by appellate judges. In the appeal of Denning's final case, Lord Diplock commented "I cannot refrain from noting with regret, which is, I am sure, shared by all members of the Appellate Committee of this House, that Lord Denning M.R.'s judgment in the instant case, which was delivered on September 29, 1982 is probably the last in which your Lordships will have the opportunity of enjoying his eminently readable style of exposition and his stimulating and percipient approach to the continuing development of the common law to which he has himself in his judicial lifetime made so outstanding a contribution."

== Legacy ==
Denning has been described as the most influential judge of the 20th century, in part because of his changes to the common law and also due to his personalisation of the legal profession. Former prime minister Margaret Thatcher referred to Denning as "probably the greatest English judge of modern times" and former prime minister Tony Blair lauded him as "one of the great men of his age". The Lord Chief Justice, Lord Bingham of Cornhill, said "Lord Denning was the best-known and best-loved judge of this or perhaps any generation" and "a legend in his own lifetime".

With his judgments on war pensions and his role in the enquiry into the Profumo affair, Denning became possibly the best-known judge ever to belong to the English judiciary, with the public treating Denning and the Court of Appeal as synonymous. He was equally well-loved and controversial, appreciated for his role as "the people's judge" and his support for the common man and disliked by elements of the bar and judiciary for "uncertainty in the law" created by his broad judgments.

Denning made sweeping changes to the Common Law, with the resurrection of equitable estoppel and his reform of divorce law. A common misconception is that most of his judgments were overturned in the House of Lords; many were, including the expansion to the doctrine of fundamental breach he set out in Photo Production Ltd v Securicor Transport Ltd, but they let many judgments stand and on occasion agreed with his judgment in situations where he dissented, such as in his final case George Mitchell (Chesterhall) Ltd v Finney Lock Seeds Ltd in 1983.

== Personal life ==
Denning met his future wife Mary Harvey on 25 October 1914 aged 15 at his confirmation; she was the daughter of the Vicar of Whitchurch. Denning attempted to court her for many years, but for a long time his love was unrequited, with Mary wanting them to be only friends. After a dance at Beaulieu on 18 January 1930, she told him of her love for him, and he returned to Hampshire with her to pick out an engagement ring. Barely six months away from the set date for their wedding, Mary was diagnosed with tuberculosis, but she recovered and the couple were married on 28 December 1932, with the wedding officiated by Cecil Henry Boutflower, Bishop of Southampton.

The couple moved to London in 1933, but the city at the time was sooty and foggy. This affected Mary's health, and after treatment at Guy's Hospital she was transferred to Brompton Hospital, where she had a lung removed. After recovering, she moved to Southampton to stay with her parents for two years, with Denning visiting every weekend. By 1935, she had fully recovered, and the couple bought a house in Tylers Green, Cuckfield, called Fair Close. Their son was born in 1938. Mary developed gallstones in 1941, and after an initial recovery had a haemorrhage on 21 November, dying the next morning.

In 1945, Denning met Joan Stuart, a widow with three children. They married on 27 December 1945, and were by all accounts happy together. His step-daughter, Hazel (later Fox) was still at school but with his assistance she became later a leading lawyer. On 19 October 1992, Joan suffered a massive heart attack; although she survived the initial attack, she died a few days later on 23 October.

Denning spoke with a rural Hampshire accent throughout his life, which made him stand out.

== Arms ==
Coat of arms of Tom Denning, Baron Denning
Crest Out of a cap of maintenance Gules turned up Ermine a cubit arm vested and holding in the glove Argent a roll of parchment Proper Escutcheon Per bend Or and Gules a fess wavy between two lions’ heads erased in chief and a lion’s head affronty in base all counterchanged Supporters Dexter Judge Mansfield in his wig sinister Judge Coke in his cap both gowned and holding in their exterior hands a roll of parchment Proper Motto Fiat Justitia (Latin for 'Let justice be done') Orders Order of Merit

== Publications ==
- Denning, Alfred Thompson (1949). Freedom Under the Law. London: Stevens & Sons. ISBN 0-420-42140-8 – via Internet Archive.
- Denning, Alfred Thompson (1953). The Changing Law. London: Stevens & Sons. ISBN 8-175-34434-2.
- Denning, Alfred Thompson (1955). The Road to Justice. Stevens & Sons. ISBN 0-421-40200-8 – via Internet Archive.
- Denning, Alfred Thompson (1979). The Discipline of Law. Butterworths. ISBN 978-0-406-17604-2 – via Internet Archive.
- Denning, Alfred Thompson (1980). The Due Process of Law. Butterworths. ISBN 978-0-406-17607-3.
- Denning, Alfred Thompson (1981). The Family Story. Butterworths. ISBN 0-406-17609-4 – via Internet Archive.
- Denning, Alfred Thompson (1982). What Next in the Law. Butterworths. ISBN 978-0-406-17602-8 – via Internet Archive.
- Denning, Alfred Thompson (1983). The Closing Chapter. Butterworths. ISBN 0-406-17611-6 – via Internet Access.
- Denning, Alfred Thompson (1984). Landmarks in the Law. Butterworths. ISBN 978-0-406-17614-1 – via Internet Archive.

== See also ==
- List of cases involving Lord Denning

== Bibliography ==
- Denning, Alfred Thompson (1983). The Closing Chapter. Butterworths. ISBN 978-0-406-17612-7.
- de Burgh, Hugo, ed. (2000). Investigative Journalism: Context and Practice. Routledge. ISBN 978-0-415-19054-1.
- Elliott, Catherine (2007). English legal system. Pearson Education. ISBN 978-1-4058-4733-9.
- Freeman, Iris (1993). Lord Denning – A Life. Random House. ISBN 978-0-09-174594-3.
- Heward, Edmund (1990). Lord Denning: A Biography. George Weidenfeld & Nicolson Limited. ISBN 978-0-297-81138-1.
- Hodge, Sue (2004). Tort Law. Willan Publishing. ISBN 978-1-84392-098-4.
- McKendrick, Ewan (2007). Contract Law (7th ed.). Palgrave Macmillan. ISBN 978-0-230-01883-9.
- Mortimer, John (1984). In Character. Penguin Books. ISBN 978-0-14-006389-9.
- Oughton, David (1987). "Liability in tort for economic loss suffered by the consumer of defective goods". Journal of Business Law. ISSN 0021-9460.
- Whitton, Evan (1988). The Cartel: Lawyers and their Nine Magic Tricks. E & N Whitton. ISBN 978-0-646-34887-2.
- Wilson, James (2023). Lord Denning: Life, Law and Legacy. Wildy, Simmonds & Hill. ISBN 978-0-854-902941.

Legal offices
Preceded by Lord Evershed	Master of the Rolls; 1962–1982	Succeeded by Lord Donaldson of Lymington
