= Central London Property Trust Ltd v High Trees House Ltd =

Legal doctrines of promissory estoppel

High Trees
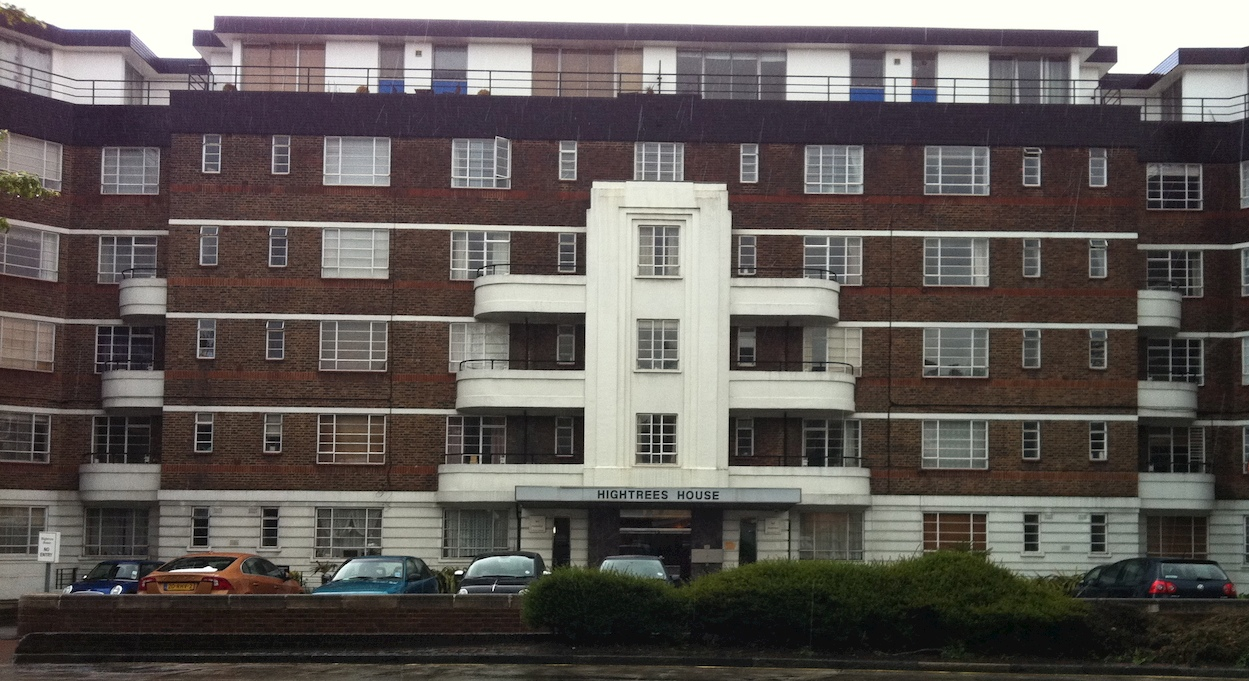
- High Trees House in Clapham, London
- Court: King's Bench Division
- Decided: 18 July 1946
- Citation: [1946] EWHC KB 1; [1947] KB 130; [1956] 1 All ER 256; 62 TLR 557; [1947] LJR 77; 175 LT 333
- Transcript: BAILII

Court membership
- Judge sitting: Denning J

Keywords
- Promissory estoppel

Central London Property Trust Ltd v High Trees House Ltd [1947] KB 130, commonly called High Trees, is a leading opinion in the High Court relating to contract law. It reaffirmed and extended the doctrine of promissory estoppel in the contract law of England and Wales. However, the most significant part of the judgment is obiter dictum as it relates to hypothetical facts; that is, the landlord did not seek repayment of the full wartime rent.

Denning J held estoppel to be applicable if

a promise was made which was intended to create legal relations and which, to the knowledge of the person making the promise, was going to be acted on by the person to whom it was made and which was in fact so acted on.

== Facts ==
High Trees House Ltd leased a block of flats in Battersea, London from Central London Property Trust Ltd. The agreement was made in 1937 and specified an annual ground rent of £2,500. The outbreak of World War II in September 1939 led to a downturn in the rental market. High Trees struggled to find tenants for the property and approached Central London Property Trust in January 1940 to request that the rent be lowered. A reduction to £1,250 per year was agreed in writing, though the duration was not specified and no consideration was provided.

By 1945, the building was returning to full occupancy. On 21 September 1945, Central London Property wrote to High Trees to request a return to the full rent of £2,500 and claiming arrears of £7,916 for the period since 1940. They then brought a test action to recover part of the debt for the two quarters which had elapsed since June 1945.

== Judgment ==
Based on previous judgments as Hughes v Metropolitan Railway Co, Denning J held that the full rent was payable from the time that the flats became fully occupied in mid-1945. However, he continued in an obiter statement that if Central London had tried to claim for the full rent from 1940 onwards, they would not have been able to. This was reasoned on the basis that if a party leads another party to believe that he will not enforce his strict legal rights, then the courts will prevent him from doing so at a later stage. Being obiter dicta and in a court of first instance this was doubly not a binding precedent, yet it essentially created the doctrine of promissory estoppel.

If I were to consider this matter without regard to recent developments in the law, there is no doubt that had the plaintiffs claimed it, they would have been entitled to recover ground rent at the rate of £2,500 a year from the beginning of the term, since the lease under which it was payable was a lease under seal which, according to the old common law, could not be varied by an agreement by parol (whether in writing or not), but only by deed. Equity, however stepped in, and said that if there has been a variation of a deed by a simple contract (which in the case of a lease required to be in writing would have to be evidenced by writing), the courts may give effect to it as is shown in Berry v. Berry [1929] 2 K. B. 316. That equitable doctrine, however, could hardly apply in the present case because the variation here might be said to have been made without consideration. With regard to estoppel, the representation made in relation to reducing the rent was not a representation of an existing fact. It was a representation, in effect, as to the future, namely, that payment of the rent would not be enforced at the full rate but only at the reduced rate. Such a representation would not give rise to an estoppel, because, as was said in Jorden v. Money (1854) 5 H. L. C. 185, a representation as to the future must be embodied as a contract or be nothing.

But what is the position in view of developments in the law in recent years? The law has not been standing still since Jorden v. Money (1854) 5 H. L. C. 185. There has been a series of decisions over the last fifty years which, although they are said to be cases of estoppel are not really such. They are cases in which a promise was made which was intended to create legal relations and which, to the knowledge of the person making the promise, was going to be acted on by the person to whom it was made and which was in fact so acted on. In such cases the courts have said that the promise must be honoured. The cases to which I particularly desire to refer are: Fenner v. Blake [1900] 1 Q. B. 426, In re Wickham (1917) 34 T. L. R. 158, Re William Porter & Co., Ld. [1937] 2 All E. R. 361 and Buttery v. Pickard [1946] W. N. 25. As I have said they are not cases of estoppel in the strict sense. They are really promises - promises intended to be binding, intended to be acted on, and in fact acted on. Jorden v. Money (1854) 5 H. L. C. 185 can be distinguished, because there the promisor made it clear that she did not intend to be legally bound, whereas in the cases to which I refer the proper inference was that the promisor did intend to be bound. In each case the court held the promise to be binding on the party making it, even though under the old common law it might be difficult to find any consideration for it. The courts have not gone so far as to give a cause of action in damages for the breach of such a promise, but they have refused to allow the party making it to act inconsistently with it. It is in that sense, and that sense only, that such a promise gives rise to an estoppel. The decisions are a natural result of the fusion of law and equity: for the cases of Hughes v. Metropolitan Ry. Co. (1877) 2 App. Cas. 439, 448, Birmingham and District Land Co. v. London & North Western Ry. Co. (1888) 40 Ch. D. 268, 286 and Salisbury (Marquess) v. Gilmore [1942] 2 K. B. 38, 51, afford a sufficient basis for saying that a party would not be allowed in equity to go back on such a promise. In my opinion, the time has now come for the validity of such a promise to be recognized. The logical consequence, no doubt is that a promise to accept a smaller sum in discharge of a larger sum, if acted upon, is binding notwithstanding the absence of consideration: and if the fusion of law and equity leads to this result, so much the better. That aspect was not considered in Foakes v. Beer (1884) 9 App. Cas. 605. At this time of day however, when law and equity have been joined together for over seventy years, principles must be reconsidered in the light of their combined effect. It is to be noticed that in the Sixth Interim Report of the Law Revision Committee, pars. 35, 40, it is recommended that such a promise as that to which I have referred should be enforceable in law even though no consideration for it has been given by the promisee. It seems to me that, to the extent I have mentioned, that result has now been achieved by the decisions of the courts.

I am satisfied that a promise such as that to which I have referred is binding and the only question remaining for my consideration is the scope of the promise in the present case. I am satisfied on all the evidence that the promise here was that the ground rent should be reduced to £1,250 a year as a temporary expedient while the block of flats was not fully, or substantially fully let, owing to the conditions prevailing. That means that the reduction in the rent applied throughout the years down to the end of 1944, but early in 1945 it is plain that the flats were fully let, and, indeed the rents received from them (many of them not being affected by the Rent Restrictions Acts), were increased beyond the figure at which it was originally contemplated that they would be let. At all events the rent from them must have been very considerable. I find that the conditions prevailing at the time when the reduction in rent was made, had completely passed away by the early months of 1945. I am satisfied that the promise was understood by all parties only to apply under the conditions prevailing at the time when it was made, namely, when the flats were only partially let, and that it did not extend any further than that. When the flats became fully let, early in 1945, the reduction ceased to apply.

In those circumstances, under the law as I hold it, it seems to me that rent is payable at the full rate for the quarters ending 29 September and 25 December 1945.

If the case had been one of estoppel, it might be said that in any event the estoppel would cease when the conditions to which the representation applied came to an end, or it also might be said that it would only come to an end on notice. In either case it is only a way of ascertaining what is the scope of the representation. I prefer to apply the principle that a promise intended to be binding, intended to be acted on and in fact acted on, is binding so far as its terms properly apply. Here it was binding as covering the period down to the early part of 1945, and as from that time full rent is payable.

I therefore give judgment for the plaintiff company for the amount claimed.

== Significance ==
Advances have been made in promissory estoppel since its inception in High Trees to create a new inroad into the rule in Pinnel's case that an agreement to accept part payment of a debt in full satisfaction of it is unenforceable for want of consideration. Denning commented that such an agreement should now be enforceable under the doctrine of promissory estoppel, and indeed the plaintiff did not seek the full debt on the basis of what was fair and, perhaps, thought was the law. However, the courts were at first reluctant to overrule or distinguish cases like Pinnel's case and Foakes v Beer having formed part of the common law for so long. Lady Justice Arden in Collier v P & MJ Wright (Holdings) Ltd (2007) accepted in principle that High Trees could be used to extinguish a creditor's right to full payment of a debt in such circumstances.

In Amalgamated Investment Co v Texas Bank it was decided that proprietary estoppel can act as a sword and not merely as a shield (that is, it can be used as a cause of action rather than merely providing a defence to an action).

== See also ==
- Estoppel
- Promise
