= Baltic Shipping Company v Dillon =

Judgement of the High Court of Australia

- Court: High Court of Australia
- Decided: 10 February 1993
- Citations: [1993] HCA 4, (1993) 176 CLR 344

Case history
- Prior actions: Dillon v Baltic Shipping Co (1989) 21 NSWLR 614; Baltic Shipping Co v Dillon [1991] NSWCA 19, (1991) 22 NSWLR 1; Dillon v Baltic Shipping Co [1991] HCA 37 (security for costs)
- Subsequent action: Dillon v Baltic Shipping Co [No 2] [1993] NSWCA 83

Court membership
- Judges sitting: Mason CJ, Brennan, Deane, Dawson, Toohey, Gaudron, McHugh JJ

Keywords
- Exclusion clause, personal injury, breach of contract, non-pecuniary loss, restitutionary damages, total failure of consideration

Baltic Shipping Company v Dillon, the Mikhail Lermontov case, is a leading Australian contract law case, on the incorporation of exclusion clauses and damages for breach of contract or restitution for unjust enrichment.

== Facts ==
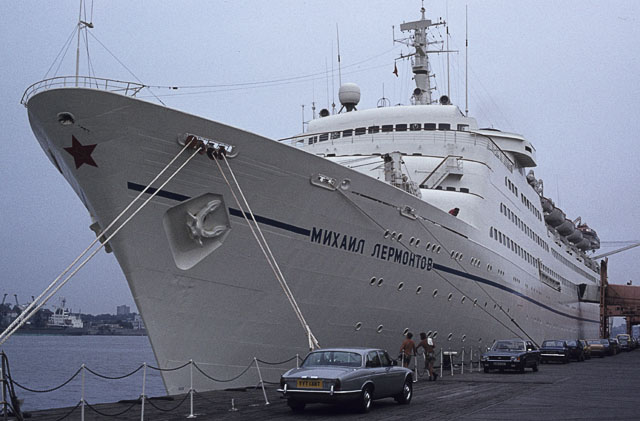
The Mikhail Lermontov at Tilbury

A widow, Mrs Joan Dillon, bought a cruise from a charterer's travel brochure on the cruise ship MS Mikhail Lermontov (named after the Russian poet, Mikhail Yuryevich Lermontov). She paid a deposit and on 6 December 1985 received a booking form that said the ticket would be issued subject to conditions. On 24 January 1986 she received the ticket, which limited liability for personal injury. The ship sank. Mrs Dillon was injured and lost some valuables. She was sent a loss form without reference to personal injuries. The company offered her an ex gratia sum to settle if she signed a release form. She accepted and signed. In 1987 the insurance company and Mrs Dillon sued to recover damages for personal injury and other losses.

== Judgment ==
=== Trial court ===
Carruthers J awarded Mrs Dillon (1) restitution of the sum paid for the cruise (2) damages for loss of valuables (3) compensation for disappointment and distress (4) damages for personal injury (5) interest, all totaling $51,000. Award (1) was, however, reversed in the High Court (below).

So far as incorporation of the exclusion clause went, he held that the contract was made on 6 December, so no new terms could be introduced when the balance of the cruise fare was paid. The terms were insufficiently notified. The Trade Practices Act 1974, s 74 applied to loss of luggage and s 68(1)(c) said the clauses limiting liability for its loss were void. By s 87, the widow was entitled to treat the release form as void ab initio because the company had intended to deceive and mislead the widow into thinking her rights under the contract of carriage were limited to the points under the loss form. The form was substantially and procedurally unfair and void ab initio under the Contracts Review Act 1980.

Carruthers J said this.

Or, looked at from another point of view, if there were no concluded contract until the ticket had been issued and accepted, it would follow that the defendant could at any time prior to the issue of the ticket, have ended what on its view, would have been no more than negotiations for a contract. Thus at virtually the last moment, the plaintiff's plans for a cruising holiday could have been unilaterally terminated although she had paid the full passage money. (The comments by Mr. Justice Brandon in The Dragon, to which I have referred above, are apposite in this regard.) Such an analysis of the transaction is wholly unacceptable. Furthermore, if it had been intended that no contract should come into existence before the issue and acceptance of the ticket, no consideration moved from the defendant to support the defendant's right (asserted in the booking form) to retain the fare if the passage is cancelled within 60 days of sailing. The comments by Mr. Justice Brennan Fay's case (at p 401) should be noted in this regard.

The question then arises whether the contract made on 6 Dec. 1985 contained the ticket terms and conditions. The booking form, in my opinion, formed part of the contract which was perfected on 6 Dec. 1985. I have already adverted to the fact that the booking form declared that it was "not a travel document"and provided that –

...contract of carriage for travel as set out herein will be made only at the time of the issuing of tickets and will be subject to the conditions and regulations printed on the tickets.

Although, as I have held the contract of carriage was made on 6 Dec. 1985 prior to the issue of the ticket, contrary to the assertions made in the booking form, it is necessary to consider whether the provisions of the booking form had the effect of introducing into the contract the ticket terms and conditions. There is now clear authority for the proposition that –

...where an exemption clause is contained in a ticket or other document intended by the carrier to contain the terms of carriage, yet the other party is not in fact aware when the contract is made that an exemption clause is intended to be a term of the contract, the carrier cannot rely on that clause unless at the time of the contract the carrier had done all that was reasonably necessary to bring the clause to the passenger's notice.

See Fay's case, per Mr. Justice Brennan (at p 402) and the cases there cited.

In the light of the decided cases, I do not consider that the conclusion is open on the facts of this case, that sufficient was done to bring to the notice of the plaintiff, before the fare was paid, the limitation clauses contained in the ticket terms and conditions. As Lord Denning MR, said in Thornton v Shoe Lane Parking Ltd [1971] 2 QB 163, at p 170:

It is no use telling the customer that the ticket is issued subject to some "conditions" or other, without more: for he may reasonably regard "conditions" in general as merely regulatory, and not as taking away his rights unless the exempting condition is drawn specifically to his attention.

I should specifically mention that I do not consider the statement in the booking form that-

These conditions and regulations are available to all passengers at any CTC Cruises offices... was sufficient to discharge the obligation which rested upon the defendant in this regard.See The Eagle.

For the sake of completeness reference should be made to the following statement in the brochure:

All bookings are subject to CTC Cruises' terms and conditions. Payment of your deposit to CTC Cruises or your travel agent constitutes your agreement to the terms and conditions. The terms and conditions are available on request and are contained in CTC Cruises' Passenger Tickets.

It has now been authoritatively established by Fay's case that a promotional brochure of this kind is not contractual in nature (per Messrs. Justices Wilson and Toohey at p. 393, with whom Mr. Justice Deane agreed). Even so, the statement in the brochure was insufficient, in my view, to bring to the attention of the plaintiff the limitation clauses contained in the ticket terms and conditions. See Fay per Mr. Justice Brennan at p. 402.

As I have said, I am of the view that the contract of carriage was concluded on 6 Dec. 1985. Thereupon the plaintiff was entitled to the production by the defendant of a ticket which would enable her to board the vessel. However, as the issue of such ticket was required by an antecedent contract, the defendant was not entitled to introduce new conditions of carriage by printing them on the ticket.

=== High Court ===
The Baltic Shipping Company's appeal to the High Court was unsuccessful, except that they were able to establish that the purchase price of the ticket did not need to be returned in full. There had been merely a "partial failure of consideration", not total, and therefore restitutionary damages were barred. Another important point was that Mrs Dillon was not allowed to recover the balance of the fare and damages for breach of contract at the same time. The restitutionary and compensatory damages, thought the Court, should be alternatives. Mason CJ's judgment on this point was as follows.

THE CLAIM FOR RESTITUTION OF THE FARE

Basis on which the claim is advanced

5. By cl.12 of her further amended writ of summons in personam, the respondent claimed: "return of the full fare in the sum of $2,205.00 as for a total failure of consideration". By cl.7 of the defence, the appellant simply denied that there had been a total failure of consideration. At trial, the respondent's claim was refined so as to extend only to the balance of the fare not already refunded by the appellant, that balance being $1,417.50.

6. Carruthers J. held that the contract of passage was an entire one, and said:

"In reality, the plaintiff got no benefit from this contract. It is true that she did have eight days cruising on the vessel and visited the Bay of Islands, Auckland, Tauranga, Wellington and Picton, but those benefits were entirely negated by the catastrophe which occurred upon departure from Picton. Thus, I would allow the amount claimed under this head."

In the Court of Appeal, the appellant challenged the finding that there was a total failure of consideration. The challenge was rejected. Kirby P, with whom Gleeson CJ agreed on this point, noted that the appellant had urged that there was no total failure of consideration as "(t)he respondent had had the benefit of eight of fourteen days of an idyllic cruise." He concluded that the contract of carriage was an entire one. Kirby P said:

"On this point it is my view that Carruthers J reached the right conclusion. The respondent did not contract with the appellant for an eight-day cruise, still less for an eight-day cruise interrupted by the disaster which befell the MS Mikhail Lermontov. What she contracted for was a relaxing holiday experience. It is this that she failed to secure. The contract of carriage was properly categorised as an entire contract. I agree with the judge that there is a good analogy to Sir George Jessel MR's statement in Re Hall and Barker: '...If a shoemaker agrees to make a pair of shoes, he cannot offer you one shoe, and ask you to pay one half of the price.'"

He then observed that, in order to avoid over-compensation, a claim for restitution of money paid on a total failure of consideration will succeed only if accompanied by counter-restitution of benefits bargained for and received by the claimant.

7. In the Court of Appeal, the appellant also relied upon cl.9 of the printed ticket terms and conditions. That clause incorporated a right to proportional return of the consideration in certain circumstances. Kirby P. held that the clause, while it could exclude the right to restitution in certain circumstances, was inapplicable for two reasons: first, the clause was not incorporated into the contract of carriage; secondly, by reason of the admission of negligence by the appellant, the reason for the impossibility of continuation of the voyage was not "beyond the control" of the appellant and, therefore, a precondition of its operation was not satisfied. Gleeson CJ agreed generally that the ticket terms and conditions were not incorporated.

However, he said that sufficient notice may have been given of some terms and conditions printed on the ticket so as to incorporate them. He did not consider cl.9 separately.

8. Accordingly, the Court of Appeal, by majority, held that the respondent was entitled to restitution of the balance of the fare.

9. In this Court, the appellant contends that the majority in the Court of Appeal erred in holding that the respondent was entitled to restitution of the whole of the fare. In support of this contention, the appellant submits that there was not a total failure of consideration arising from the fact that the contract of carriage was entire.

The appellant also submits that a plaintiff cannot pursue both a claim for restitution of the consideration paid under a contract and a claim for damages for breach of that contract. It seems that this argument was not presented to, or considered by, the courts below. The merits of this argument, which will be considered below, do not necessarily depend on the availability of damages for disappointment and distress. That is but one head of damages whose recoverability is in question. However, if restitution is available and such damages are recoverable, questions of double compensation arise.

Is the fare recoverable on the ground of total failure of consideration or otherwise?

10. An entire contract or, perhaps more accurately, an entire obligation is one in which the consideration for the payment of money or for the rendering of some other counter-performance is entire and indivisible. In Steele v Tardiani, Dixon J. cited the general proposition stated in Edward Vaughan Williams's Notes to Saunders:

"Where the consideration for the payment of money is entire and indivisible, as where the benefit expected by the defendant under the agreement is to result from the enjoyment of every part of the consideration jointly, so that the money payable is neither apportioned by the contract, nor capable of being apportioned by a jury, no action is maintainable, if any part of the consideration has failed; for, being entire, by failing partially, it fails altogether."

11. The concept of an entire contract is material when a court is called upon to decide whether complete performance by one party is a condition precedent to the other's liability to pay the stipulated price or to render an agreed counter-performance. If this were a case in which the appellant sought to enforce a promise to pay the cruise fare at the conclusion of the voyage the concept would have a part to play; then, if the appellant's obligations were entire, on the facts as I have stated them, the appellant's incomplete performance of its obligations would not entitle it to recover.

12. When, however, an innocent party seeks to recover money paid in advance under a contract in expectation of the entire performance by the contract-breaker of its obligations under the contract and the contract-breaker renders an incomplete performance, in general, the innocent party cannot recover unless there has been a total failure of consideration. If the incomplete performance results in the innocent party receiving and retaining any substantial part of the benefit expected under the contract, there will not be a total failure of consideration.

13. In the context of the recovery of money paid on the footing that there has been a total failure of consideration, it is the performance of the defendant's promise, not the promise itself, which is the relevant consideration. In that context, the receipt and retention by the plaintiff of any part of the bargained-for benefit will preclude recovery, unless the contract otherwise provides or the circumstances give rise to a fresh contract. So, in Whincup v Hughes, the plaintiff apprenticed his son to a watchmaker for six years for a premium which was paid. The watchmaker died after one year. No part of the premium could be recovered. That was because there was not a total failure of consideration.

A qualification to this general rule, more apparent than real, has been introduced in the case of contracts where a seller is bound to vest title to chattels or goods in a buyer and the buyer seeks to recover the price paid when it turns out that title has not been passed. Even if the buyer has had the use and enjoyment of chattels or goods purportedly supplied under the contract for a limited time, the use and enjoyment of the chattels or goods has been held not to amount to the receipt of part of the contractual consideration. Where the buyer is entitled under the contract to good title and lawful possession but receives only unlawful possession, he or she does not receive any part of what he or she bargained for. And thus, it is held, there is a total failure of consideration. As this Court stated in David Securities Pty Ltd v Commonwealth Bank:

"the notion of total failure of consideration now looks to the benefit bargained for by the plaintiff rather than any benefit which might have been received in fact".

14. An alternative basis for the recovery of money paid in advance pursuant to a contract in expectation of the receipt of the consideration to be provided by the defendant may arise when the defendant's right to retain the payment is conditional upon performance of his or her obligations under the contract. This basis of recovery has a superficial, but not a close, resemblance to the concept of an entire contract. In this class of case the plaintiff may be entitled to recover so long as the payment remains conditional.

15. So, in Dies v British and International Mining and Finance Corporation, the plaintiff bought arms for the price of 135,000 pounds, paying 100,000 pounds in advance. Though unwilling or unable to take delivery, the plaintiff succeeded in recovering the payment, notwithstanding that Stable J held that there was not a total failure of consideration.

There can be no such failure when the plaintiff's unwillingness or refusal to perform the contract on his or her part is the cause of the defendant's non-performance. The decision is explicable either on the ground that the seller accepted the plaintiff's repudiation and thus itself effected the discharge of the contract or on the ground that the payment was a mere part payment, the right to which depended upon performance of the contract and was thus conditional. Of the two explanations, the second is to be preferred because it is in closer accord with the judgment of Stable J. His Lordship said:

"(W)here the language used in a contract is neutral, the general rule is that the law confers on the purchaser the right to recover his money, and that to enable the seller to keep it he must be able to point to some language in the contract from which the inference to be drawn is that the parties intended and agreed that he should".

This statement in turn accords with the distinction drawn by Lord Denman C.J. (to which Stable J. referred) in Palmer v Temple between a deposit which was to be forfeited if the plaintiff should not perform the contract and a mere part payment the right to which depended upon performance of the contract. The statement also accords with the point made by Dixon J. in McDonald v Dennys Lascelles Ltd, where he said:

"When a contract stipulates for payment of part of the purchase money in advance, the purchaser relying only on the vendor's promise to give him a conveyance, the vendor is entitled to enforce payment before the time has arrived for conveying the land; yet his title to retain the money has been considered not to be absolute but conditional upon the subsequent completion of the contract."

16. The question whether an advance payment, not being a deposit or earnest of performance, is absolute or conditional is one of construction. In determining that question it is material to ascertain whether the payee is required by the contract to perform work and incur expense before completing this performance of his or her obligations under the contract. If the payee is so required then, unless the contract manifests a contrary intention, it would be unreasonable to hold that the payee's right to retain the payment is conditional upon performance of the contractual obligations.

17. I have come to the conclusion in the present case that the respondent is not entitled to recover the cruise fare on either of the grounds just discussed. The consequence of the respondent's enjoyment of the benefits provided under the contract during the first eight full days of the cruise is that the failure of consideration was partial, not total. I do not understand how, viewed from the perspective of failure of consideration, the enjoyment of those benefits was "entirely negated by the catastrophe which occurred upon departure from Picton", to repeat the words of the primary judge.

18. Nor is there any acceptable foundation for holding that the advance payment of the cruise fare created in the appellant no more than a right to retain the payment conditional upon its complete performance of its entire obligations under the contract. As the contract called for performance by the appellant of its contractual obligations from the very commencement of the voyage and continuously thereafter, the advance payment should be regarded as the provision of consideration for each and every substantial benefit expected under the contract. It would not be reasonable to treat the appellant's right to retain the fare as conditional upon complete performance when the appellant is under a liability to provide substantial benefits to the respondent during the course of the voyage. After all, the return of the respondent to Sydney at the end of the voyage, though an important element in the performance of the appellant's obligations, was but one of many elements.

In order to illustrate the magnitude of the step which the respondent asks the Court to take, it is sufficient to pose two questions, putting to one side cl.9 of the printed ticket terms and conditions. Would the respondent be entitled to a return of the fare if, owing to failure of the ship's engines, the ship was unable to proceed on the last leg of the cruise to Sydney and it became necessary to airlift the respondent to Sydney? Would the fare be recoverable if, owing to a hurricane, the ship was compelled to omit a visit to one of the scheduled ports of call? The answer in each case must be a resounding negative.

19. The respondent sought to derive support from authorities relating to the contracts for the carriage of goods by sea which hold that freight is due on the arrival of the goods at the agreed destination. More to the point is the principle that an advance by the shipper on account of the freight to be earned is, in the absence of any stipulation to the contrary, "an irrevocable payment at the risk of the shipper of the goods". The result of this rule is that an advance on account of freight may be retained, notwithstanding that, because of a failure to complete the voyage and to deliver the goods, the freight remains unearned and that a payment due as an advance on account of freight is recoverable (if not duly paid) even after frustration of the voyage.

This does not mean that freight is earned prior to delivery: it will be earned upon shipment only if the parties expressly so stipulate). This rule, although it has been said to be a stipulation introduced into such contracts by custom and not the result of applying some abstract principle, would certainly exclude a restitutionary claim on facts analogous to those in the present case.

The combination of a claim for restitution and a claim for damages

20. In view of my conclusion that the respondent cannot succeed in her restitutionary claim for recoupment of the fare, there is no necessity for me to consider whether the two claims can be maintained. However, as the question has been argued, I should record my view of the question. There is authority to suggest that the claims are alternative and not cumulative. But Lord Denning MR was clearly of the view that the claims may be concurrent. In Heywood v Wellers, he said:

"(The plaintiff) could recover the 175 pounds as money paid on a consideration which had wholly failed. She was, therefore, entitled to recover it as of right. And she is entitled to recover as well damages for negligence. Take this instance. If you engage a driver to take you to the station to catch a train for a day trip to the sea, you pay him 2 pounds – and then the car breaks down owing to his negligence. So that you miss your holiday. In that case you can recover not only your 2 pounds back but also damages for the disappointment, upset and mental distress which you suffered".

Lord Denning was speaking of negligence in the sense of breach of a contractual obligation of due care. He noted a qualification to the entitlement to maintain the two claims:

"Some reduction should be made for the fact that if the (defendants) had done their duty... it would have cost her something."

That reduction was accordingly made to the damages for breach of contract.

21. Similarly, in Millar's Machinery Company Limited v David Way and Son, the Court of Appeal dismissed an appeal from a decision of Branson J. in which such a dual award was made. The case concerned a contract for supply of machinery. It was held that there had been a total failure of consideration and that the purchasers were entitled to recover the amount paid on account. In addition, the purchasers were held to be entitled to damages, the proper measure of which was:

"the sum which the (purchasers) had to spend to put themselves in the position which they would have been if the (suppliers) had carried out their contract".

That amount was the difference between the contract price and the amount which they had to pay to another supplier for a similar machine.

22. And Treitel says in relation to claims for loss of bargain, reliance loss and restitution:

"There is sometimes said to be an inconsistency between combining the various types of claim... The true principle is not that there is any logical objection to combining the various types of claim, but that the plaintiff cannot combine them so as to recover more than once for the same loss ... The point has been well put by Corbin: 'full damages and complete restitution ... will not both be given for the same breach of contract'."

23. The action to recover money paid on a total failure of consideration is on a common money count for money had and received to the use of the plaintiff. To the extent that it is necessary to say so, this decision correctly reflects the law in Australia and, to the extent that it is inconsistent, should be preferred to the decision of this Court in In re Continental C and G Rubber Co Proprietary Ltd. The action evolved from the writ of indebitatus assumpsit. It is available only if the contract has been discharged, either for breach or following frustration, and if there has been a total, and not merely partial, failure of consideration. It is now clear that, in these cases, the discharge operates only prospectively, that is, it is not equivalent to rescission ab initio . Nor is rescission ab initio a precondition for recovery. Unconditionally accrued rights, including accrued rights to sue for damages for prior breach of the contract, are not affected by the discharge. Prepayments can, in general, be recovered, but the position of deposits or earnests is not entirely clear, the better view being that they are not recoverable if paid to provide a sanction against withdrawal.

24. In 1846, when Pollock CB held in Walstab v Spottiswoode that it was not possible to combine a claim for damages with one for restitution, the restitutionary action was brought on the writ of indebitatus assumpsit, was essentially a procedural development, simplifying recovery and providing a more convenient or more summary remedy). Subsequently, Lord Wright said in Fibrosa Spolka Akcyjna v Fairbairn Lawson Combe Barbour Ltd:

"The writ of indebitatus assumpsit involved at least two averments, the debt or obligation and the assumpsit . The former was the basis of the claim and was the real cause of action. The latter was merely fictitious and could not be traversed, but was necessary to enable the convenient and liberal form of action to be used in such cases."

The action was, as Lord Mansfield said in Moses v Macferlan, "quasi ex contractu" and founded on an obligation imposed by law and accommodated within the system of formal pleading by means of the fictitious assumpsit or promise. It was necessary to plead the fictitious assumpsit until the enactment of s.3 of the Common Law Procedure Act 1852 (Eng.). And even then its influence continued.

The abolition of the forms of action inspired an analysis of the sources of obligation in the common law in terms of a rigid dichotomy between contract and tort. In that context, there was little room for restitutionary obligation imposed by law except as a "quasi-contractual" appendix to the law of contract. As a result, until recently, restitutionary claims were disallowed when a promise could not be implied in fact. However, since Pavey and Matthews Pty Ltd v Paul, such an approach no longer represents the law in Australia.

25. But, in the circumstances prevailing in 1846, it is not difficult to see that a plaintiff would necessarily be put to an election between the real and fictitious promises. In cases of tort it is equally plain that there had to be a choice between an action on a fictitious assumpsit (waiving the tort) and seeking damages for the tort.

26. The decision in Walstab v Spottiswoode may also be seen as a consequence of two historical threads. The first is the competition in the latter part of the sixteenth century between the judges of the King's Bench and those of the Common Pleas as to the relationship between debt and assumpsit . The critical decision in the resolution of the conflict was Slade's Case. While the precise contemporary import of the decision is a matter of controversy, it was taken in the seventeenth century as deciding that indebitatus assumpsit lay as well as debt to recover sums due under a contract in the absence of an express subsequent promise to pay. The assumpsit or promise was founded "not upon any fiction of law, but upon an interpretation of facts by the court which led it to the genuine conclusion that the parties had actually agreed (to make the payment)".

27. The second is the decision at around the same time that indebitatus assumpsit lay in circumstances where the assumpsit was necessarily imputed rather than genuinely implied from the facts. Arris v Stukley is an example. In that case, the defendant, who had been granted by letters patent the office of comptroller of the customs at the port of Exeter, continued to pretend title to that office after its termination and grant to the plaintiff. The Court held that indebitatus assumpsit lay to recover the profits received by the defendant after the grant of the office to the plaintiff. In Holmes v Hall Holt CJ refused to nonsuit the plaintiff who sued on an indebitatus assumpsit to recover moneys he paid as executor to the defendant who held certain writings of the testator. The defendant failed to perform his promise to deliver up the writings.

28. But it was recognized early on that cases like Holmes v Hall were equally cases of breach of contract in which a special assumpsit lay, and the question was raised whether the plaintiff should be required to bring his or her action in that form. In Moses v Macferlan, Lord Mansfield said that the plaintiff would be permitted to proceed on an indebitatus assumpsit, although an action for damages in covenant or on a special assumpsit was available. He continued:

"If the plaintiff elects to proceed in this favourable way (on the indebitatus assumpsit ), it is a bar to his bringing another action upon the agreement; though he might recover more upon the agreement, than he can by this form of action."

He referred to Dutch v. Warren, where the general principles were re-stated as follows:

"(T)he defendant by a refusal to execute, or by a complete and selfevident inability to perform, or by a fraudulent execution he has given the plaintiff an option to disaffirm the contract, and recover the consideration he was paid for it in the same manner as if it had never existed ... But then the contract must be totally rescinded, and appear unexecuted in every part at the time of bringing the action; since otherwise, the contract is affirmed by the plaintiff's having received part of that equivalent for which he has paid his consideration, and it is then reduced to a mere question of damages proportionate to the extent to which it remains unperformed."

See also Greville v Da Costa.

29. This insistence on rescission or the non-existence of an "open" contract makes it easier to understand how the decision in Chandler v Webster. We now know the effect of discharge to be different and, as Fibrosa indicates, nothing more than that usual effect is necessary to ground the action to recover money paid on a total failure of consideration.

Conclusion: the respondent cannot recover the fare and damages for breach of contract

30. The old forms of action cannot provide the answer today. But, in my view, Walstab v Spottiswoode and the earlier cases support the view expressed by Corbin and Treitel that full damages and complete restitution will not be given for the same breach of contract. There are several reasons. First, restitution of the contractual consideration removes, at least notionally, the basis on which the plaintiff is entitled to call on the defendant to perform his or her contractual obligations. More particularly, the continued retention by the defendant is regarded, in the language of Lord Mansfield, as "against conscience" or, in the modern terminology, as an unjust enrichment of the defendant because the condition upon which it was paid, namely, performance by the defendant may not have occurred. But, equally, that performance, for deficiencies in which damages a re sought, was conditional on payment by the plaintiff. Recovery of the money paid destroys performance of that condition. Secondly, the plaintiff will almost always be protected by an award of damages for breach of contract, which in appropriate cases will include an amount for substitute performance or an amount representing the plaintiff's reliance loss. Nothing said here is inconsistent with McRae v Commonwealth Disposals Commission.

31. I would therefore conclude that, even if the respondent had an entitlement to recover the cruise fare, Carruthers J. and the majority of the Court of Appeal erred in allowing restitution of the balance of the fare along with damages for breach of contract. The consequences of this conclusion will be considered below in light of the conclusion to be reached with regard to the award of damages for disappointment and distress.

== Assessment ==
- K Barker, 'Restitution of Passenger Fare' [1994] LMCLQ 291, argues there is no logical inconsistency between recovering restitutionary damages and compensatory damages, provided there is no double recovery. Also, he argues the court should have addressed the point that although there was no total failure of consideration, restitution should be allowed for partial failure of consideration.

== See also ==
- Unfair Contract Terms Act 1977
- English contract law

== Notes ==
=== Bibliography ===
- Beatson (1991). The Use and Abuse of Unjust Enrichment.
- Birks (1989). An Introduction to the Law of Restitution.
- Birks, Peter; McLeod, Grant (1986). "The implied contract theory of quasi-contract: civilian opinion current in the century before Blackstone". Oxford Journal of Legal Studies. 6 (1): 46–85. doi:10.1093/ojls/6.1.46. JSTOR 764468.
- Goff; Jones (1986). The Law of Restitution (3rd ed.).
- Ibbetson, David (1984). "Sixteenth century contract law: Slade's case in context". Oxford Journal of Legal Studies. 4 (3): 295–317. doi:10.1093/ojls/4.3.295.
- Jackson (1936). The History of Quasi-Contract in English Law.
- Stoljar (1975). A History of Contract at Common Law.
- Winfield (1952). The Law of Quasi-Contracts.
