= Hussey v Palmer =

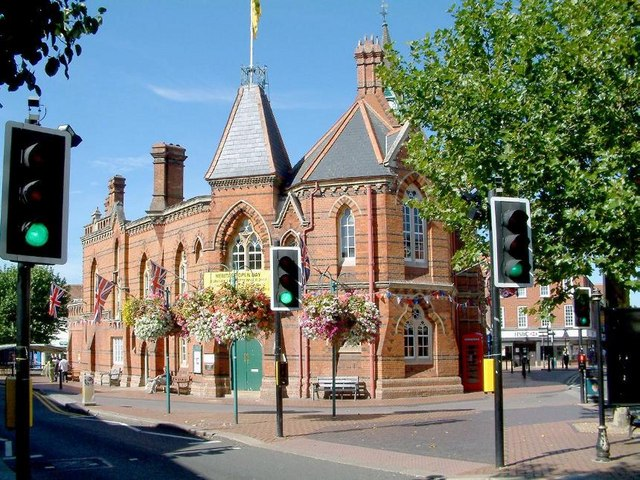
- Court: Court of Appeal of England and Wales
- Full case name: Mrs. Emily Hussey v P. Palmer (male)
- Decided: June 22, 1972
- Citations: [1972] EWCA Civ 1, [1972] 1 WLR 1286, [1972] 3 All ER 744, CA

Case opinions
- Lord Denning MR, Phillimore LJ, Cairns LJ (dissenting)

Keywords
- Constructive trust, resulting trust, equity

Hussey v Palmer [1972] EWCA Civ 1 is an English trusts law case of the Court of Appeal. It concerned the equitable remedy of constructive trusts. It invokes the equitable maxim, "equity regards the substance and not the form."

== Facts ==
A mother, Mrs Hussey, lived on the same property as her daughter at 9 Stanley Road, Wokingham. The mother spent £607 to build an extension to the house of her daughter and son-in-law. After they had a dispute, the mother left the house. The mother claimed that she had an interest in the property, and the daughter argued there was no proprietary right.

== Judgment ==
The Court of Appeal held by majority that a trust was created in favour of the plaintiff. The payment was not intended as a gift, and it would be unconscientious for the money to be retained without a proprietary right arising, in proportion to the money expended.

Lord Denning MR said the following.

If there was no loan, was there a resulting trust? and, if so, what were the terms of the trust?

Although the plaintiff alleged that there was a resulting trust, I should have thought that the trust in this case, if there was one, was more in the nature of a constructive trust: but this is more a matter of words than anything else. The two run together. By whatever name it is described, it is a trust imposed by law whenever justice and good conscience require it. It is a liberal process, founded upon large principles of equity, to be applied in cases where the legal owner cannot conscientiously keep the property for himself alone, but ought to allow another to have the property or the benefit of it or a share in it. The trust may arise at the outset when the property is acquired, or later on, as the circumstances may require. It is an equitable remedy by which the court can enable an aggrieved party to obtain restitution. It is comparable to the legal remedy of money had and received which, as Lord Mansfield said, is “very beneficial and therefore, much encouraged” [Moses v Macferlan (1760) 2 Burr 1005, 1012]. Thus we have repeatedly held that, when one person contributes towards the purchase price of a house, the owner holds it on a constructive trust for him, proportionate to his contribution, even though there is no agreement between them, and no declaration of trust to be found, and no evidence of any intention to create a trust. Instances are numerous where a wife has contributed money to the initial purchase of a house or property; or later on to the payment of mortgage instalments; or has helped in a business: see Falconer v Falconer [1970] 1 WLR 1333; Heseltine v Heseltine [1971] 1 W.L.R. 342 and In re Cummins [1972] Ch. 62. Similarly, when a mistress has contributed money, or money's worth, to the building of a house: Cooke v Head [1972] 1 WLR 518. Very recently we held that a purchaser, who bought a cottage subject to the rights of an occupier, held it on trust for her benefit: Binions v Evans [1972] Ch. 359. In all those cases it would have been quite inequitable for the legal owner to take the property for himself and exclude the other from it. So the law imputed or imposed a trust for his or her benefit.

The present case is well within the principles of those cases. Just as a person, who pays part of the purchase price, acquires an equitable interest in the house, so also he does when he pays for an extension to be added to it. Mr. Owen has done a lot of research and has found a case in 1858 to that very effect. It is Unity Joint Stock Mutual Banking Association v King (1858) 25 Beav. 72. A father had land on which he built a granary. His two sons built two other granaries on it at a cost of £1,200. Sir John Romilly M.R. held that the two sons had a lien or charge on the property as against the father, and any person claiming through him. The father had never promised to pay the sons £1,200. He was not indebted to them in that sum. He had never engaged or promised to make over the land to them or to give them a charge on it. Yet they had a lien or charge on the land. That case was approved by the Privy Council in Chalmers v Pardoe [1963] 1 WLR 677, 681–682, where it was said to be based on the “general equitable principle that… it would be against conscience” for the owner to take the land without repaying the sums expended on the buildings. To this I would add Inwards v Baker [1965] 2 QB 29, when a son built a bungalow on his father's land in the expectation that he would be allowed to stay there as his home, though there was no promise to that effect. After the father's death, his trustees sought to turn the son out. It was held that he had an equitable interest which was good against the trustees. In those cases it was emphasised that the court must look at the circumstances of each case to decide in what way the equity can be satisfied. In some by an equitable lien. In others by a constructive trust. But in either case it is because justice and good conscience so require.

In the present case Mrs. Hussey paid £607 to a builder for the erection of this extension. It may well be, as the defendant says, that there was no contract to repay it at all. It was not a loan to the son-in-law. She could not sue him for repayment. He could not have turned her out. If she had stayed there until she died, the extension would undoubtedly have belonged beneficially to the son-in-law. If, during her lifetime, he had sold the house, together with the extension, she would be entitled to be repaid the £607 out of the proceeds. He admits this himself. But he has not sold the house. She has left, and the son-in-law has the extension for his own benefit and could sell the whole if he so desired. It seems to me to be entirely against conscience that he should retain the whole house and not allow Mrs. Hussey any interest in it, or any charge upon it. The court should, and will, impose or impute a trust by which Mr. Palmer is to hold the property on terms under which, in the circumstances that have happened, she has an interest in the property proportionate to the £607 which she put into it. She is quite content if he repays her the £607. If he does not repay the £607, she can apply for an order for sale, so that the sum can be paid to her. But the simplest way for him would be to raise the £607 on mortgage and pay it to her. But, on the legal point raised, I have no doubt there was a resulting trust, or, more accurately, a constructive trust, for her, and I would so declare. I would allow the appeal, accordingly.

Phillimore LJ concurred with Lord Denning MR.

Cairns LJ dissented, and said the following.

It must be a common thing indeed for a parent or a parent-in-law to make a loan of money to a son or daughter or a son-in-law which both of them know is a loan, as to which it is obvious that there is no immediate prospect of repayment, but which in law is a loan repayable on demand. In my view that is the position here. As it was a loan, I think it is quite inconsistent with that to say that it could create a resulting trust at the same time. I accept as a correct statement of law the short passage in Underhill's Law of Trusts and Trustees, 12th ed. (1970), p. 210, in these words:

“Where the purchase money is provided by a third party at the request of and by way of loan to the person to whom the property is conveyed there is no resulting trust in favour of the third party, for the lender did not advance the purchase-money as purchaser… but merely as lender.”

And it seems to me that that proposition is equally applicable where it is not a matter of the property being purchased, but a matter of a builder being paid for an extension to a property which already belongs to the borrower of the money. For these reasons I consider that the plaintiff was certainly not entitled to succeed on the evidence which she had given. As the particulars of claim stood, the only doubt that I could have had about the matter, if my judgment had been decisive, would be as to whether she should simply have the appeal dismissed or whether at this late stage she should have been given an opportunity of amending her particulars of claim and having a re-trial. I should have been anxious that she should have that opportunity, because I think the strong probability is that one way or another she ought to have got this money back. So far as concerns the inconvenience of having a third hearing, I do not think that is owing to anything done or omitted on the defendant's side. However, in the circumstances it is unnecessary for me to arrive at any final opinion as to which would have been the right course.

== See also ==
- English trusts law
- Trusts
- Court of Equity
