= Pavey & Matthews Pty Ltd v Paul =

Judgement of the High Court of Australia

- Court: High Court of Australia
- Decided: 4 March 1987
- Citations: [1987] HCA 5, (1985) 162 CLR 221, 69 ALR 577, 61 ALJR 151

Case history
- Prior actions: Paul v Pavey & Matthews Pty Ltd (1985) 3 NSWLR 114
- Appealed from: NSW Court of Appeal

Case opinions
- Majority: Mason, Wilson, Deane & Dawson JJ
- Dissent: Brennan J

Keywords
- Restitution, work, building, oral contract

Pavey & Matthews Pty Ltd v Paul, is a leading Australian case concerning unjust enrichment, and an award for restitution based on quantum meruit.

== Facts ==
Pavey & Matthews renovated a cottage belonging to Mrs. Paul. Their contract was orally agreed, and at the end of the renovation Pavey & Mathews were paid a sum of $36,000—only a portion of what they claimed they were owed; Pavey & Matthews said the prevailing rate was $63,000, and were still owed $27,000. Because the contract was not in writing (as required by the Builders Licensing Act) it was considered unenforceable. Even though the contract was unenforceable, the question that the case needed to answer, was whether a quantum meruit claim could be independent of a contract and thus avoid the Licensing Act.

== Judgment ==
The High Court of Australia (Brennan J dissenting) held that the case was independent of the Act, and the extra $27,000 was awarded. The majority—Deane J, Mason J and Wilson J—rejected that the claim was based on an implied oral contract, falling foul of the Act. The basis was not Mrs Paul's promise to pay, but rather the work done and its acceptance by Mrs Paul. The Licensing Act was designed to allow building owners to withdraw from their oral commitments, not to enable them to pay nothing for work that they requested and approved. Pavey & Mathews would have received less restitution only if Mrs Paul had withdrawn her promise before the work had begun, but the builders had gone ahead anyway. Also, the quantum meruit (the amount rewarded) could be no higher than the objective market rate for the work, even if Mrs Paul's promise was for a higher price.

Deane J said the following:

unjust enrichment in the law of this country… constitutes a unifying legal concept which explains why the law recognises, in a variety of distinct categories of case, an obligation on the part of a defendant to make a fair and just restitution for a benefit derived at the expense of a plaintiff and which assists in the determination, by the ordinary processes of legal reasoning, of the question whether the law should, in justice, recognise such an obligation in a new or developing category of case…

The High Court's recognition of a principle of restitution based on unjust enrichment in this case has been historically significant for Australian private law.

== See also ==
- English unjust enrichment law
