= Money had and received =

An action for money had and received to the plaintiff's use is the name for a common law claim derived from the form of action known as indebitatus assumpsit. The action enabled one person to recover money which has been received by another: for example, where a plaintiff paid money to the defendant while labouring under a mistake of fact or where there was a total failure of consideration. The action was a personal action only available in respect of money, rather than other benefits. Where the benefit received by the defendant was services or goods, the appropriate action was a quantum meruit or a quantum valebant, respectively.

The action for money had and received formed a part of the law of quasi-contract. Although the forms of action were abolished in the mid-19th century, reference continues to be made to the action in modern pleading. The terminology of "quasi-contract" has been replaced by the more modern terminology of unjust enrichment in most common law jurisdictions.

== Case law ==
- Moses v Macferlan (1760) 2 Bur 1005; 97 Eng. Rep. 676 (King's Bench, England)
- Bingham v. Cabot, 3 U.S. (3 Dall.) 19 (1795) (Supreme Court of the United States)
- Kershaw v Kirkpatrick [1878] UKPC 4 (Privy Council, from Canada)
- Sinclair v Brougham [1914] AC 398 (House of Lords, England)
- Jackson v Horizon Holidays Ltd [1975] 1 WLR 1468 (Court of Appeal of England and Wales)
- Lipkin Gorman v Karpnale Ltd [1991] 2 AC 548 (House of Lords, England)
- The Mikhail Lermontov [1990] 1 Lloyd's Rep 579 (High Court of Australia)
- Westdeutsche Landesbank Girozentrale v Islington LBC [1996] UKHL 12 (House of Lords, England)
- Philip Collins Ltd v Davis [2000] 3 All ER 808 (High Court, England)

== See also ==
- Law of Restitution
