= Quasi-contract =

Fictional contract recognised by a court

A quasi-contract (or implied-in-law contract or constructive contract) is a fictional contract recognised by a court. The notion of a quasi-contract can be traced to Roman law and is still a concept used in some modern legal systems. Quasi contract laws have been deduced from the Latin statement "Nemo debet locupletari ex aliena jactura", which proclaims that no one should grow rich out of another person's loss. It was one of the central doctrines of Roman law.

== History ==
In common law jurisdictions, the law of quasi-contract can be traced to the medieval form of action known as indebitatus assumpsit. In essence, the plaintiff would recover a money sum from the defendant as if the defendant had promised to pay it: that is, as if there were a contract subsisting between the parties. The defendant's promise—their agreement to be bound by the "contract"—was implied by law. The law of quasi-contract was generally used to enforce restitutionary obligations.

The form of action known as indebitatus assumpsit came to include various sub-forms known as the common money counts. The most important of these for the later development of the law of quasi-contract included: (i) actions for money had and received to the plaintiff's use; (ii) actions for money paid to the defendant's use; (iii) quantum meruit; and (iv) quantum valebant.

Quasi-contractual actions were generally (but not exclusively) used to remedy what would now be called unjust enrichment. In most common law jurisdictions the law of quasi-contract has been superseded by the law of unjust enrichment.

== Quasi-contract and contract ==
A quasi-contract is distinct from a contract implied in fact and may be distinguished from an explicitly agreed contract. (Note: See for example Eighth Circuit Court of Appeals, Rambo v. South Tama County, 11 January 2008: "This is an action in contract and quasi-contract for services ... After a bench trial, the district court entered judgment for Rambo on its contract claim and denied recovery on the quasi-contract claim.")

- Contract implied in fact. A person's assent to be bound by an agreement can be expressed or implied. In the latter case, assuming the requisite formalities for a valid contract are met, there is a perfectly normal contract. The only distinction between a contract arising by express agreement between two people and a contract implied-in-fact is that the latter was recognized by a court drawing inferences from facts proved at trial. When the plaintiff sued on either sort of contract, he was suing in the law of contract in respect of a consensually assumed obligation and her remedy for the defendant's breach was damages.
- Quasi-contract. In contrast, quasi-contract refers to situations in which a defendant is bound as if there were a contract. When the plaintiff sued on such a 'contract' by bringing an action of indebitatus assumpsit, he was not enforcing some consensually assumed obligation, but rather an obligation imposed by law.

== See also ==
- Implied-in-fact contract
- Negotiorum gestio
- Promissory estoppel
- Restitution and unjust enrichment
  - Officious intermeddler
