= Legal wager =

Roman legal procedure

In the Roman litigation system, while the Legis Actiones procedure was in force during the early Republic, both parties had to lay down a legal wager at the preliminary hearing, probably to discourage frivolous litigation. In some cases, if the party lost, the wager went to the other party, to compensate him for his inconvenience, rather than to the court to cover costs.

== Legis actiones ==
There were three different types of legis actiones, and the wager differed in each one.

=== Sacramentum ===
The standard procedure for litigation under the legis actiones system, it was used whenever another procedure was not prescribed by statute. Both parties had to lay down a wager of 50 asses, 500 if the matter under dispute was worth 1000 or more. The wager of the winning party would be returned, but the loser's would be forfeited to the state. While the reasoning lay, in theory, in the idea of a sacrifice to the gods, its main effect was to discourage frivolous litigation since the sums laid down as wagers were substantial.

=== Ludicis arbitrive postulatio ===
This procedure (in full, "legis actio per iudicis arbitrive postulationem", "complaint before the judge or arbiter") was used only in some in personam cases laid down by statute. It did not require any wager at all and so was much less risky for the plaintiff.

=== Condictio ===
Used from around the 3rd century BC for the recovery of a specific thing or specific sum of money (such as from a debtor), it did not require a wager as such, but the parties exchanged promises to the effect that the loser would pay to the winner one third of the sum at issue. If the plaintiff won, he received four thirds of the sum, and the defendant received one third of the sum if he won.

== From 1911 Britannica ==
Wager (derived, through Fr. wagier, gagier, from Lat. vadium, a pledge), a bet or stake. Wagers in the ordinary sense of the term are dealt with under the headings Gaming and Betting; but the method of wagering - in principle the putting of a decision to the hazard - has had extended employment in various cases which may be noticed here. The determination of cases, civil and criminal, by means of wager or analogous forms of procedure, was a characteristic feature of ancient law. The legis actin sacramenti at Rome - at first a real, then a fictitious, wager - and the wagers "of battle" and "of law" in England, of the highest antiquity in their origin, survived up to a comparatively late period in the history of both legal systems. The form of the wager survived long after its reason had been forgotten. The general prevalence of the wager form of proceeding is perhaps to be attributed to the early conception of a judge as a mere referee who decided the dispute submitted to him, not as an executive officer of the state, but as an arbitrator casually called in (see Maine, Ancient Law, c. x.).

The procedure in a wager of law is traced by Blackstone to the Mosaic law, Ex. xxii. 10; but it seems historically to have been derived from the system of compurgation, introduced into England from Normandy, a system which is now thought to have had an appreciable effect on the development of the English jury. It also has some points of resemblance, perhaps some historical connexion, with the sponsao and the decisory oath of Roman law, and the reference to oath of Scots law (see Oath). The use of the oath instead of the real or feigned combat - real in English law, feigned in Roman law - no doubt represents an advance in legal development. The technical term sacramentum is the bond of union between the two stages of law. In the wager of law the defendant, with eleven compurgators, appeared in court, and the defendant swore that he did not owe the debt, or (in detinue) that he did not detain the plaintiff's chattel; while the compurgators swore that they believed that he spoke the truth. It was an eminently unsatisfactory way of arriving at the merits of a claim, and it is therefore not surprising to find that the policy of the law was in favour of its restriction rather than of its extension. Thus it was not permitted where the defendant was not a person of good character, where the king sued, where the defendant was the executor or administrator of the person alleged to have owed the debt, or in any form of action other than those named, even though the cause of action were the same. No wager of law was allowed in assumpsit, even though the cause of action were a simple debt. This led to the general adoption of assumpsit - proceeding originally upon a fictitious averment of a promise by the defendant - as a means of recovering debts. Where a penalty was created by statute, it became a common form to insert a proviso that no wager of law was to be allowed in an action for the penalty. Wager of law was finally abolished in 18 33 (3 & 4 William IV. c. 42).

Another form of judicial wager in use up to 1845 was the feigned issue, by which questions arising in the course of chancery proceedings were sent for trial by jury in a common law court. The plaintiff averred the laying of a wager of with the defendant that a certain event was as he alleged; the defendant admitted the wager, but disputed the allegation; on this issue was joined. This procedure was abolished by s. Iq of the Gaming Act 1845. (W. F. C.)

== See also ==
- Roman litigation
- Law of costs
- Wager of battle
