= Form of action =

The forms of action were the different procedures by which a legal claim could be made during much of the history of the English common law. Depending on the court, a plaintiff would purchase a writ in Chancery (or file a bill) which would set in motion a series of events eventually leading to a trial in one of the medieval common law courts. Each writ entailed a different set of procedures and remedies which together amounted to the "form of action".

The forms of action were abolished during the 19th century, but in the view of legal historian Frederic William Maitland their influence was still being felt in his time to the extent that they were said to "rule us from their graves".

== Forms of action ==
The substantive law lay buried beneath the various actions: medieval practitioners and judges thought procedurally, not substantively. Rights and duties which are today considered to be part of the law of property, tort, contract or unjust enrichment were not conceptualised as such.

In the early medieval period, English justice was administered at a local level, first through traditional Anglo-Saxon institutions such as the courts of the hundreds and the wapentakes, and later through the manorial courts. Following the Norman conquest of England in the 11th century, a system of centralized royal justice gradually began to take shape. The principal royal courts were King's Bench, Common Pleas, and Exchequer. These royal courts were initially only interested in matters relating to the feudal system: that is, to land law. Accordingly, many of the earliest writs dealt with real property. For example:

- Writ of right
- assize of novel disseisin
- assize of mort d'ancestor
- Writ of entry sur disseisin in the per and cui
- Writ of besaiel
- Writ of quare impedit
- Ejectment

Over time, the royal courts began to take notice of other cases. These early writs were in the praecipe form: they commanded that the defendant perform a certain act or else appear and explain why he had not done so. Examples include the writs of covenant, debt and account. Such writs demanded something as of right. The royal courts were initially only concerned with complaints of wrong if the wrong involved a forcible breach of the King's Peace. Such wrongs were enforced by a writ of trespass vi et armis contra pacem regis. During the 14th century the royal courts gradually allowed actions which did not involve breaches of the King's Peace. Instead, the plaintiff would set out his 'special case' in an extra clause, specifying the damage sustained which justified the bringing of an action. This was known as a trespass on the case. From the trespass on the case developed many other forms of action. Apart from the actions which dealt with real property, other significant forms of action include:

- Action of covenant
- Action of debt sur obligation ("Debt on an obligation")
- Action of debt sur contract ("Debt on a contract")
- Action of detinue
- Action of account
- Trespass vi et armis contra pacem regis ("Trespass with force and arms against the King's peace")
- Trespass sur la case ("Trespass on the case" or "action on the case")
  - Conversion
  - Nuisance
  - Negligence
  - Deceit
  - Action on the case for words (Defamation, Slander)
  - Assumpsit
    - Special assumpsit
    - Indebitatus assumpsit
      - Action for money had and received to the plaintiff's use
      - Action for money paid to the defendant's use
      - Quantum meruit
      - Quantum valebant

Many actions developed from the action on the case during the later history of the common law. The three most significant of these were:

- The action of assumpsit, the rapid expansion of which is traced to Slade's Case (1602). The medieval law of contract developed in a fractured way through the old actions of covenant, debt and account. In the 1500s litigants began to use the action on the case to enforce contractual agreements (with the exception of contracts under seal, for which debt sur obligation was required), a shift vindicated in Slade's Case. The modern law of contract then gradually began to take shape.
- The action of indebitatus assumpsit. Following the recognition in Slade's Case (1602) that assumpsit could be brought in lieu of debt sur contract, a form of action known as indebitatus assumpsit took shape. This action developed several sub-forms known as the common money counts. These actions were initially used to enforce what we would call contractual liability, but they rested on the court implying that a defendant had promised to pay a sum of money to the plaintiff. This promise initially reflected reality, but came to be used fictitiously. Thus where A mistakenly paid money to B, the law would imply a promise by B that B would repay the money: A could then bring an action for money had and received and recover the mistaken payment. The defendant's obligation was not consensually undertaken, but imposed by law. From such actions came the law of quasi-contract. This area of law is now known as the law of unjust enrichment.
- The action on the case for negligence, the rapid expansion of which is traced to Donoghue v Stevenson [1932]. The tort of negligence lies at the heart of the modern law of tort, which also includes obligations enforced via the old actions of trespass (to the person, to goods, and to land), actions on the case, conversion, deceit, and defamation.

== England ==
One of the reasons for the crystallisation of particular forms of action in English common law is the fact that actions in the royal courts were commenced by use of a writ purchased in Chancery. Initially, the clerks of the Chancery were permitted to devise new writs to deal with new situations. This freedom was drastically curtailed in 1258 by the Provisions of Oxford.

By the 14th century, the common law had begun to show some of its defects. First, different forms of action would result in different procedures, meaning that one's chance of success was strongly dependent upon the form of action which was used. The forms were mandatory: if the wrong form was used, a case would be dismissed with prejudice. Second, the common law had strict rules of evidence. For example, a deed was conclusive proof of a defendant's liability to pay. If a plaintiff brought a writ of debt sur obligation against the defendant, but the defendant had already paid the debt, the defendant would still be held liable to pay unless he could produce a deed of acquittance. Problems such as these prompted litigants to turn to the Court of Chancery, which had begun to develop judicial functions in the early 14th century.

=== Abolition of the forms ===
Because the forms of action remained largely static from the 13th century, English lawyers and judges formulated a number of legal fictions in order to fit new types of cases within the existing forms.

For example, in a writ of debt sur contract, the defendant could generally elect between having a jury trial or wager of law. The latter was a particularly undesired option for a plaintiff because the defendant could hire oath-helpers. This and other restrictions (for example, that the sum the plaintiff sued for had to be a fixed rather than an unliquidated sum) made debt sur contract undesirable for enforcing oral contracts. In the 16th century, litigants began to bring an action on the case instead: an action of assumpsit. The plaintiff would allege that, because the defendant was indebted to the plaintiff, the defendant had undertaken (assumpsit) to pay the money. The Court of King's Bench gradually accepted that the subsequent promise did not need to be proven: the defendant's alleged promise to pay the antecedent debt would be supplied by law. This view was vindicated in Slade's Case (1602).

The forms themselves remained unchallenged. The Court of Chancery eventually ceased to be the answer to the restrictive approach at common law. By the 16th century the intervention of the Lord Chancellor was increasingly said to depend on principles, rather than on some unbounded discretion. Chancery developed a stronger system of precedent and, in the words of Professor Sir John Baker, "hardened into a kind of law".

During the 19th century, Parliament passed several laws to simplify legal procedure, and the old forms of action were gradually swept away:

- For personal forms of action, the Uniformity of Process Act 1832 (2 & 3 Will. 4. c. 39) imposed a single uniform process. The older forms of writ were abolished and a new form of writ was to be used, although the writ had to state the form of action that was being used.
- The next year, most real and mixed actions were abolished, by section 36 of the Real Property Limitation Act 1833 (3 & 4 Will. 4. c. 27).
- There then followed the Common Law Procedure Act 1852 (15 & 16 Vict. c. 76), which dropped the requirement that any particular form of action should be mentioned within a writ.
- With the passage of the Supreme Court of Judicature Act 1873 (36 & 37 Vict. c. 66), most of the last vestiges of the forms of action were removed. The flexible bill procedure of Chancery was adopted by the common law courts. It was now only necessary to state the facts sufficient to give rise to one's cause of action.

The final vestige of the forms of action was abolished in 1980 by Chancellor Hailsham: the language of the original writs in which the sovereign commanded the defendant to appear in court and answer, or else. Lord Hailsham felt that "sending a command from the queen herself was too intimidating" for ordinary laypeople. The last original writ in the name of the queen was issued on 2 June 1980.

=== The substantive law ===
With the abolition of the forms of action, it became necessary (and for the first time truly possible) to perceive the substantive law beneath the various actions. In terms of the private law of obligations, the following points can be noted.

- Contract. The various writs by which agreements could be enforced became part of a modern law of contract, explicable in terms of consensually assumed obligation. But traces of the old forms of action remain. For example, it is not necessary to show that a claimant has provided consideration where she sues on a deed. This is because consideration was never a requirement in the action of debt sur obligation.
- Tort. The various writs which involved complaint of a civil wrong and a demand for a remedy came together in a law of tort.
- Unjust enrichment. At first, common law restitutionary obligations were appended to the law of contract and said to form a law of quasi-contract. Motivated by the writing of scholars from Oxford and Cambridge the courts gradually accepted that such obligations were of another kind, underpinned by the concept of unjust enrichment. In Lipkin Gorman v Karpnale Ltd [1991] the House of Lords explicitly recognised the independent existence of the law of unjust enrichment.

== South Australia ==
The Common Law Procedure Act 1852 (15 and 16 Vic., c. 76) was enacted prior to the promulgation of the Colonial Laws Validity Act 1865 and while it was repealed in England, continued to apply by paramount force in South Australia. The Supreme Court Act 1935 grants to the Supreme Court of South Australia the like jurisdiction exercised by both the common law and equity courts of England prior to the enactment of the Judiciary Acts which included the initiation of a personal jurisdiction over a person in a case by virtue of the issue of a writ of summons. The judges of the Court were given power to regulate the procedure of the Court within jurisdiction and preserved the Rules of Court extant in 1935, for cases not otherwise provided for. The writ of summons is the common originating process, but takes a form approved under the present rules.

== United States ==
The forms of action survived much longer in the United States. New York was the first to abolish them, by enacting a Code of Civil Procedure in 1850 at the suggestion of David Dudley Field II. Twenty-six other states eventually followed. Section 307 of the California Code of Civil Procedure is a typical example of how the forms of action were abolished in those states: "There is in this State but one form of civil actions for the enforcement or protection of private rights and the redress or prevention of private wrongs."

However, the forms of action persisted in the federal courts until 1938, when the Federal Rules of Civil Procedure were promulgated pursuant to the Rules Enabling Act. Rule 2, at that time, stated: "There shall be one form of action to be known as 'civil action'." Since 35 U.S. states now use versions of the FRCP in their state courts and the remaining 15 states are all "code pleading" states, the forms of action are now obsolete in the United States.

== See also ==
- Cause of action
- Writ
- Historians of English legal history:
  - Frederic William Maitland, Cambridge
  - Sir Frederick Pollock, 3rd Baronet, Oxford
  - James Barr Ames, Harvard
  - William Searle Holdsworth, Oxford
  - S. F. C. Milsom, Cambridge
  - John Baker (legal historian), Cambridge
  - David Ibbetson, Cambridge
  - A. W. B. Simpson, Oxford and Cambridge
