= Officious intermeddler =

Hypothetical role in common law doctrine

An officious intermeddler is a person who voluntarily, and without request or pre-existing legal duty, interjects themself into the affairs of another, and then seeks remuneration for services or reimbursement. Example: Person A leaves for vacation for two weeks during the summer. Person B mows A's lawn. B requests payment for this service. Under common law doctrine, B is not entitled to any payment from A beyond whatever A cares to give. If B tries to coerce payment, B is an officious intermeddler.

== Emergencies ==
An exception to this rule, however, is if a doctor gives medical treatment to an unconscious victim. Although the unconscious person did not request the doctor's services, a court may deem it reasonable for the doctor to presume that such services would be desired by the person, had they been conscious.

== Quasi-contracts ==
Another exception to this rule, in certain jurisdictions, is the existence of a quasi-contract. In general, in order for a contract to exist, there must be mutual consent among all parties. In the case of an intermeddler, be he officious or necessitous, this element of a contract is missing: consideration (goods or services) was provided by one party, but without the mutual consent of the receiving party. Therefore, no contract was made, and the intermeddler has no legal recourse to claim reimbursement. However, certain legal jurisdictions provide for an implied-in-law contract, called a quasi-contract, that exists solely for the purposes of remedying this unjust enrichment by giving a court legal means to enforce compensation. The distinction between an officious intermeddler and a necessitous or beneficial intervener operating under a quasi-contract, is that in the latter case the enriched party (accipiens) of the goods or services has knowingly accepted the goods or services, with the intention of benefiting from them without providing compensation.

== See also ==
- Quasi-contract
- Implied-in-fact contract
