= Harriton =

Harriton may refer to:

- The Harriton House, a historic house in Lower Merion Township, Pennsylvania
  - Harriton High School, the public high school serving Harrition, and a part of the Lower Merion School District
- Harriton v Stephens, a decision of the High Court of Australia
- People with the surname Harriton:
  - Abraham Harriton, Romanian-born American painter
  - Lisa Harriton, American singer-songwriter, keyboardist and sound designer
