= Harriton v Stephens =

Judgement of the High Court of Australia

- Court: High Court of Australia
- Full case name: Alexia Harriton (by her tutor George Harriton); Appellant v Paul Richard Stevens; Respondent
- Decided: 9 May 2006
- Citations: [2006] HCA 15, (2006) 226 CLR 52

Case history
- Prior actions: Harriton v Stephens [2004] NSWCA 93, (2004) 59 NSWLR 694, NSW Court of Appeal; Harriton v Stephens [2002] NSWSC 461, Supreme Court (NSW)

Court membership
- Judges sitting: Gleeson CJ, Gummow, Kirby, Hayne, Callinan, Heydon & Crennan JJ

Case opinions
- (5:1) The doctor did not owe the child a duty of care. (per Gleeson CJ, Gummow, Callinan, Heydon & Crennan JJ; Hayne J not deciding; Kirby J dissenting) (6:1) The common law test for damages for negligence is incapable of application to a situation where the comparison is between life with disabilities and a state of non-existence. (per Gleeson CJ, Gummow, Hayne, Callinan, Heydon & Crennan JJ; Kirby J dissenting)

Harriton v Stephens, was a decision of the High Court of Australia handed down on 9 May 2006, in which the court dismissed a "wrongful life" claim brought by a disabled woman seeking the right to compensation for being born after negligent medical advice that resulted in her mother's pregnancy not being terminated.

== Background ==
=== Facts ===
The appellant, Alexia Harriton, was a 25-year-old woman with severe congenital disabilities that had been caused by her mother's infection with the rubella virus while pregnant with her. These disabilities left Harriton unable to care for herself.

The defendant, Paul Richard Stephens, was the doctor of Harriton's mother while she was pregnant. After conducting and reviewing pathological tests, Dr Stephens advised the mother that she did not have the rubella virus. Harriton's mother claimed that she would have had her pregnancy terminated had she known of the chances of having a disabled child.

=== Litigation history ===
Harriton sued Dr Stephens in the Supreme Court of New South Wales, claiming that Dr Stephens failed to exercise reasonable care in his treatment of her mother, and but for that failure her mother would have terminated her pregnancy and Harriton would not have been born. The judge hearing the action, Justice Tim Studdert, dismissed the action as well as two other wrongful life cases brought at the same time.

Two of the three wrongful life cases dismissed by Justice Studdert (Harriton and Waller v James) were appealed to the New South Wales Court of Appeal (an appellate division of the Supreme Court). The Court of Appeal, by a majority of 2–1 dismissed both appeals. According to Chief Justice James Spigelman, the proposition that the duty of doctor to an unborn child extended to conduct that, properly performed, would lead to the termination of the pregnancy "should not be accepted as it does not reflect values generally, or even widely, held in the community."

== High Court appeal ==
On 29 April 2005, Harriton and Waller were granted special leave to appeal to the High Court. Their appeals were heard together on 10 November 2005. Bret Walker acted as senior counsel for Harriton instructed by Maurice Blackburn Cashman; Blake Dawson acted for Stephens with Stephen Gageler as senior counsel.

The High Court decided on 9 May 2006, by a 6–1 majority, to dismiss Harriton's appeal. Waller's appeal was dismissed on the same day with the majority in that judgment following the reasons in Harriton's appeal. The leading judgment was written by Justice Crennan, with whom Chief Justice Gleeson and Justices Gummow and Heydon concurred, giving her reasons majority support. Justices Callinan and Hayne wrote separate judgments agreeing to dismiss the appeal, while Justice Kirby dissented.

== Reaction to judgment ==
=== Press reaction ===
The High Court's judgment was reported in the media as a "landmark case". Richard Ackland, a journalist and lawyer, criticised the judgment in the Sydney Morning Herald, arguing:

What the majority position fails to accommodate is that there is a new modern order. Medical technology can detect abnormalities at very early stages of the development of a foetus. Good medical practice regularly results in the non-existence of human beings. What has been created by way of Alexia [Harriton] and Keeden [Waller] is precisely what the doctors were engaged to prevent being created.

=== Academic reaction ===
Margaret Fordham, a legal academic, wrote after the judgment that for wrongful life claims to gain acceptance, "the courts would have to undergo a complete change of heart with respect to the moral and ethical implications of such actions". Academics Evelyn Ellis and Brenda McGivern referred to the judgment as an emphatic rejection of claims for wrongful life and compared the judgment to similar rejections of wrongful life claims by courts in the United Kingdom.

The outcome of the judgment was criticised in the Sydney Law Review, which concluded:

Logic might have demanded the outcome reached by the High Court in Harriton, but fairness demands another.

Dean Stretton, a lawyer writing in the Melbourne University Law Review, claimed that the High Court's judgment "regressed", "depriving the plaintiffs of a legally justified remedy by resort to inconsistent logic and ill-considered policy".
