= Compurgation =

Mediaeval legal defence

Compurgation, also called trial by oath, wager of law, and oath-helping, was a defence used primarily in medieval law. A defendant could establish his innocence or nonliability by taking an oath and by getting a required number of persons (normally twelve) to swear that they believed the defendant's oath. The wager of law was essentially a character reference, initially by kin and later by neighbours (from the same region as the defendant), often 11 or 12 men, and it was a way to give credibility to the oath of a defendant at a time when a person's oath had more credibility than a written record. It can be compared to a legal wager, which is the provision of surety at the beginning of legal action to minimize frivolous litigation.

Compurgation was found in early Germanic law, in early French law (très ancienne coutume de Bretagne), in Welsh law, and in the English ecclesiastical courts until the seventeenth century. In common law it was substantially abolished as a defence in felonies by the Constitutions of Clarendon in 1164. The defence was still permitted in civil actions for debt and vestiges of it survived until its statutory repeal at various times in common law countries: in England in 1833, and Queensland, Australia at some point before the Queensland Common Practice Act of 1867 which makes direct reference to the abolition of wager of law.

== Etymology ==
The word compurgation is composed of Latin, com "with" and purgare "to make clean, cleanse, excuse". Latin com- is also an intensifier and turns a word into the superlative form, so compurgation, by etymology, means "to thoroughly clean or excuse", and is cognate with purge.

== Origins ==
The procedure in a wager of law is traced by Blackstone to the Mosaic law, Exodus 22:10–15; but it seems historically to have been derived from the system of compurgation, introduced into England from Normandy, a system which is now thought to have had an appreciable effect on the development of the English jury. It also has some points of resemblance, perhaps some historical connection, with the sponsio and the decisory oath of Roman law, and the reference to oath of Scottish law.

[Compurgation] had originated in Anglo-Saxon England in the ties of kinship that bound people together in the period before the year 1000, a time when each man was responsible for the acts of his blood relatives. Later, kinship gave way to a more tribal affiliation and a loyalty to the place of one's birth. When disputes more often than not led to violence, it seemed natural that neighbors would band together. They aligned themselves with a neighbour who was accused in court and swore that in good conscience they believed he was telling the truth. The number of oath-helpers required depended on the defendant's rank and the character of the lawsuit. Eventually it became standard practice to bring eleven neighbours into court to swear for the defendant. The oath-helpers were called compurgators, and the wager of law was called compurgation.

== The method of adjudication ==
After the defendant have taken an oath of innocence, their guilt or innocence is determined by a means named "trial by ordeal".

Supervised by a priest, the defendant is asked to hold a red-hot iron bar in his or her hand, or to take a stone out of a boiling boiler. If the defendant's hand recovers normally, he or she is innocent; if it does not, he or she is guilty.

== Wager of law, wager of battle and trial by ordeal ==
The wager of law, also called compurgation, is an old legal practice, dating to Saxon and feudal times, which was contemporaneous to the appeal to God to prove fact by trial by battle (wager of battle, trial by combat, or judicial duel), and of trial by ordeal.

The use of the oath instead of the real or feigned combat – real in English law, feigned in Roman law – no doubt represents an advance in legal development. The technical term sacramentum is the bond of union between the two stages of law. In the wager of law, the defendant, with eleven compurgators, appeared in court, and the defendant swore that he did not owe the debt, or (in detinue) that he did not detain the plaintiff's chattel; while the compurgators swore that they believed that he spoke the truth.

== Surety ==
A variation was for the defendant to give gage, or sureties, in an action of debt, and "that at a certain day assigned he would take a law, or oath, in open court, that he did not owe the debt, and at the same time bring with him eleven neighbors (called compurgators), who should avow upon their oaths that they believed in their consciences that he spoke the truth" (see the Tractatus of Glanvill, c. 1188).

== Determining fact ==
Wager of law was replaced by jury, from early times, to determine fact, at a time when judges managed legal procedure and did not determine fact. Trial "by lawful Judgment of his Peers, or by the Law of the Land (legus terrae)" Cap. 29 of Magna Carta 1215 to 1297.

Wager of law was practised in England (and English American colonies) until the 16th century, in criminal matters, and the 19th century, in civil matters.

== Supporting defendant's oath ==
A defendant who elected to "make his law" was permitted to make a statement before the court, swear an oath that it was true, and present one or more individuals, often 12, who swore that they believed he had told the truth under oath. The predominant form of defense in the feudal courts, it persisted for a time in the common-law courts. The individuals "did not testify about the fact itself and, indeed, might have no personal knowledge concerning it. The value of a man’s oath might vary with his status; sometimes it was necessary for a defendant to meet a charge by assembling oaths of a prescribed monetary value. Because oath making often had religious implications for those who served as oath helpers and because there was also a possibility of legal sanctions (penalties), individuals might refuse to give oaths for persons with bad reputations. One reason for the long survival of the practice was that 'wagers in law' were often considered better evidence than account books in cases of debt."

Welsh law allowed for a form of compurgation called assach, which required not 12 but 300 compurgators. A statute from 1413 (1 Hen. 5. c. 6), refers to the then late rebellion in Wales and complains that the Welshmen are still taking revenge for the deaths of their kinsmen against the king's faithful lieges. Some of such lieges they keep in prison until they paid ransom, or until they purged themselves of the death of the said rebels.

== Abolition ==
As the kings consolidated their power, suppressing violence and increasing the authority of the courts, the wager of law lost some of its ancient power and became a nuisance to litigants, who suspected that it frequently opened the door to false swearing. Different forms of action developed that did not permit the wager of law as a defense, and plaintiffs used them as much as possible. The procedure of wager of law had long since been obsolete when it was abolished during the reign of Henry IV (1399–1413).

The taking of oaths was an eminently unsatisfactory way of arriving at the merits of a claim, and it is therefore the policy of the law was in favour of its restriction rather than of its extension. Thus it was not permitted where the defendant was not a person of good character, where the king sued, where the defendant was the executor or administrator of the person alleged to have owed the debt, or in any form of action other than those named, even though the cause of action were the same.

The Lateran Council of 1215 effectively abolished trial by ordeal in Catholic countries (which England was at the time) by forbidding priests from taking part, thus eliminating its legitimacy. Trial by battle was abolished in 1819 and wager of law was abolished in 1833, although both had fallen into disuse before their formal abolition.

Wager of law was used as late as 1829, when the Rev. Fearon Jenkinson of Gnosall, Staffordshire used it against a Stafford ironmonger who claimed he was owed money by him. Jenkinson and his compurgators did not appear on the date.

Wager of law survived to recent centuries and in many jurisdictions it has been abolished by statute. It was abolished in New South Wales, Australia in 1841 by the Advancement of Justice Act 1841 (both Victoria, Australia and Queensland were still part of New South Wales at this time). This was re-enacted after separation of Queensland from New South Wales in the Queensland Common Law Practice Act 1867, but was strictly unnecessary, given its earlier abolition in 1841 which makes direct reference to the abolition of wager of law.

No wager of law was allowed in assumpsit, even though the cause of action were a simple debt. This led to the general adoption of assumpsit – proceeding originally upon a fictitious averment of a promise by the defendant – as a means of recovering debts. Where a penalty was created by statute, it became a common form to insert a proviso that no wager of law was to be allowed in an action for the penalty. Wager of law was finally abolished in 1833 (3 & 4 William IV. c. 42).

== In Islamic law ==
The practice of compurgation (known as qasāma) was a part of the customary penal law in pre-Islamic Arabia, and became a part of early Islamic jurisprudence. If the body of a murdered person was found on occupied lands or a village, fifty inhabitants were required to take an oath that they did not cause the person's death, nor did they have knowledge of who did. If fewer than fifty persons were available, the people present had to swear more than once until fifty oaths had been obtained. This freed the people at the scene of criminal liability, but they were bound to pay blood money to the agnates of the decedent.

== See also ==
- Anglo-Saxon law
- Slade's Case
- Trial by combat
- Trial by ordeal

== Bibliography ==
- Baker, J. H. (2002). An Introduction to English Legal History (4th ed.). London, England: Butterworths. pp. 5–6. ISBN 0-406-93053-8.
