= Roman litigation =

Overview of Roman law systems

The history of Roman law can be divided into three systems of procedure: that of legis actiones, the formulary system, and cognitio extra ordinem. Though the periods in which these systems were in use overlapped one another and did not have definitive breaks, the legis actio system prevailed from the time of the Twelve Tables (c. 450 BC) until about the end of the 2nd century BC, the formulary procedure was primarily used from the last century of the Republic until the end of the classical period (c. AD 200), and cognitio extra ordinem was in use in post-classical times.

== Legis actiones ==
The remarkable aspect of a trial of an action under the legis actio procedure (and also later under the formulary system) was characterized by the division of the proceedings into two stages, the first of which took place before a magistrate, under whose supervision all the preliminaries were arranged, the second, in which the issue was actually decided, was held before a judge. The magistrate in question taking part in the preliminary stage was typically the consul or military tribune, almost exclusively the praetor upon the creation of this office. The judge was neither a magistrate nor a private lawyer, but an individual agreed upon by both parties.

=== Summons ===
Summons under the legis actiones system were in the form of in ius vocatio, conducted by voice. The plaintiff would request, with reasons, that the defendant come to court. If he failed to appear, the plaintiff could call reasons and have him dragged to court. If the defendant could not be brought to court, he would be regarded as indefensus, and the plaintiff could, with the authorization of the praetor, seize his property. The defendant may elect a representative to appear in his place, or seek a vadimonium – a promise to appear on a certain day with a threat of pecuniary penalty if he failed to appear.

=== Preliminary hearing ===
At the first stage of the case, a hearing took place before the praetor, in order to agree the issue and appoint a judge. This was conducted through exchanges of ritual words, the two different types being known as the declarative which were the legis actio sacramento (which could be in rem or in personam), legis actio per iudicis arbitrive postulationem and legis actio per condictionem and the executive type legis actio per pignoris capionem and legis actio per manus iniectionem. All of these involved, essentially, statements of claim by both parties, and the laying down of a wager by the plaintiff. Then, a judge was appointed who was agreeable to both parties, the praetor making a decision in the event of a disagreement. Judges were chosen from a list called the album iudicum, consisting of senators, and in the later Republic, men of equestrian rank.

=== Full trial ===
Once the judge had been appointed, the full trial could begin. This was fairly informal compared to the preliminary hearing, and was supposed under the Twelve Tables to take place in public (the Forum Romanum was frequently used). While the witnesses could not be subpoenaed, the dishonorable status of intestabilis would be conferred on a witness who refused to appear. There were few rules of evidence (and both oral and written evidence were permitted, although the former was preferred) aside from the plaintiff having the burden of proof. The trial consisted of alternating speeches by the two advocates, after which the judge gave his decision.

=== Execution ===
Unlike in the modern legal systems, victorious parties had to enforce the verdict of the court themselves. However, they were entitled to seize the debtor and imprison him until he repaid the debt. After sixty days of imprisonment, the creditor was entitled to dismember the debtor or sell him into slavery, although after the Lex Poetelia Papiria of 326 BC, the creditor could take no action other than continued imprisonment of the debtor.

== Formulary system ==
Due to the faults of the legis actiones system, namely its excessive formality, archaic nature, and limited effectiveness, a new system was introduced. This was known as the formulary system. The formula was a written document by which a civil trial authorization was given to a judge to either condemn the defendant if certain factual or legal circumstances appeared to be proved, or to absolve him if this was not the case.

=== Origins ===
The formulary system was originally used by the peregrine praetor (who was responsible for the affairs of foreigners in Rome) to deal with cases involving foreigners, which often involved substantial sums of money. This allowed the use of formulae, standardized written pleadings, to speed up cases. This was soon, by popular demand, adopted by the urban praetor for use by all Roman citizens. The lex Aebutia, of an uncertain date but somewhere between 199 BC and 126 BC, is connected with the reform of civil procedure, and it can be stated that it abolished the legis actiones and introduced the formulary procedure. The reform was completed by two statutes of Augustus under the name of leges Iuliae iudiciariae.

=== Summons ===
Defendants were summoned under the formulary system in a similar manner to under the legis actiones. The defendant was still summoned orally, but had an extra option; rather than immediately going to court, he could make a vadimonium, or promise, to appear in court on a certain day, on pain of a pecuniary forfeit. Although the plaintiff could still physically drag his opponent to court, this was scarcely used. Instead, the plaintiff could be given permission by the praetor to take possession of the defendant's estate, with a possible right of sale.

=== Preliminary hearing ===
Just like in the old legis actiones system, this took place before the praetor. During the hearing, a formula was agreed on. It consisted of up to six parts: the nominatio, intentio, condemnatio, demonstratio, exceptio, and praescriptio.

==== Nominatio ====
This part appointed a judge, in a similar matter to before, with the plaintiff suggesting names from the official list until the defendant agreed. If there was no agreement, the praetor would decide.

==== Intentio ====
This was the plaintiff's statement of claim, where he stated the allegation on which his claim was based. An example of an intentio could be, "If it appears that the property which is disputed belongs to Aulus Agerius at civil law,".

==== Condemnatio ====
The condemnatio gave the judge authority to condemn the defendant to a certain sum or to absolve him. An example of a condemnatio could be, "[If it appears that he is guilty], Condemn Numerius Negidius to Aulus Agerius for 200 denarii; otherwise absolve him."

==== Demonstratio ====
The demonstratio was used only in unliquidated, in personam claims, and stated the facts out of which the claim arose.

==== Exceptio and replicatio ====
If the defendant wished to raise a specific defense (such as self-defence), he would do so in an exceptio. However, if the plaintiff was desirous of refuting the defence, he could file a replicatio, explaining why the defence was not valid. The defendant could then file another exceptio, and so on. The last of these to be proved on the facts "won".

==== Praescriptio ====
This somewhat legalistic clause limited the issue to the matter in hand, avoiding litis contestatio, where the plaintiff was prevented from bringing another case against the same defendant on a similar issue.

=== Oath-taking ===
The case could sometimes be settled entirely through the preliminary hearing. The plaintiff could challenge the defendant to take an oath supporting his case. If the defendant was willing to swear the oath, he won, and, if not, lost. However, he had a third option - he could tender the oath back to the plaintiff, who similarly won if he took the oath and lost if he did not (he could not return the oath to the defendant). Justinian had this to say about the taking of oaths:

"(1) Where a party is sued in any kind of an action, if he makes oath it will be a benefit to him..." Source: Digesta of Justinian, Book 12, Title 2.

A solemn oath before the Gods was regarded by the Romans as a serious matter, and even a rogue would be unwilling to perjure himself in such a fashion, and the penalties for perjury were severe.

=== Full trial ===
Full trials under the formulary system were essentially the same as under legis actiones.

=== Execution ===
While the creditor was still essentially responsible for executing the judgement, there was now a remedy he could look to. This was called bonorum vendito. Thirty days after the judgement, the creditor would apply for an actio iudicati, giving the debtor a last chance to pay. If he failed to meet the debt, the creditor could apply to the praetor for missio in possessionem ("sending into possession"). He would then publicise the bankruptcy, giving other creditors a chance to come forward, thirty days after which the creditors would meet to appoint an executor.

This executor would prepare an inventory of the debtor's estate, and then hold a public auction, with the entire estate going to the bidder who was prepared to meet the greatest proportion of the debt. However, the debtor remained liable for any portion of the debt which was not met. The reason for this was probably that the bonorum vendito remedy could be used as a threat to encourage a debtor to pay up.

== Cognitio ==
The cognitio system was introduced some time after the Republic was replaced by the Empire. The main philosophical difference between the cognitio systems and those that had gone before was that, whereas the previous two essentially consisted of the State providing a system under which the two parties could resolve disputes between themselves – the basis of the case was agreed, but the case was then handed over to a private judge, and no judgement in default was available. In the cognitio, however, the State basically resolved the entire case, in the same manner as virtually all modern systems.

=== Summons ===
As in modern legal systems, the summons was served upon the defendant by the court. The plaintiff could not physically force the defendant to appear. Instead, he would lodge a libellus conventionis (a statement of claim), which would be served on the defendant by a court official, who could arrest him if he failed to appear. If he was unable to be brought to court on three separate occasions, a judgement-in-default could be entered against him. This highlights the philosophical difference between the cognitio and earlier systems—whereas before a trial required the consent of both parties, it could now be imposed by the state.

=== Trial ===
In the cognitio system, the trial took place before a magistrate, rather than a lay judge. The process tended to be less adversarial than before, as the magistrate had sole control over the case, and could admit whatever evidence he pleased. Documentary evidence was now considered to be of vital importance (indeed, a rule was introduced to the effect that a document could not be defeated by oral testimony alone). The magistrate's decision was read out in court and given in writing to both parties. As he was not bound by a formula, the magistrate could hand down a more discretionary ruling than was possible before.

=== Enforcement ===
Whereas before the victor was responsible for enforcing payment himself, he could now ask the court bailiffs to seize the defendant's property to be sold at auction.

=== Appeals ===
Under the cognitio system, an appeals procedure was available for the parties. The appeals process was extremely complex, but essentially consisted of the progression of the case through higher and higher courts, possibly culminating in the Emperor himself.

== Notes ==
- Berger, Adolph (September 1953). Encyclopedic Dictionary of Roman Law. The American Philosophical Society.
- Borkowski & du Plessis (2005). Textbook on Roman Law. Oxford University Press. ISBN 0-19-927607-2.
- Jolowicz, H. F. (1967). Historical Introduction to the Study of Roman Law. Cambridge University Press.
- Metzger, Ernest (2005). Litigation in Roman Law. Oxford University Press. ISBN 978-0-19-829855-7.
