= Bret Walker =

Australian lawyer

Bret Walker AO FAAL SC
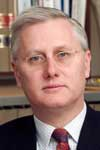
- Walker in October 2009
- Born: 1954 (age 71–72)
- Education: The King's School, Parramatta, University of Sydney (BA, LLB),
- Occupation: Barrister
- Years active: 1979–present

Bret William Walker AO FAAL SC (born 1954) is an Australian barrister.

== Family ==
Walker is the son of an Anglican minister. He is married to the Honourable Justice Sarah Pritchard, a judge of the Land and Environment Court of New South Wales.

== Education ==
Walker was educated at Concord West Public School and The King's School, Parramatta. He graduated with degrees in arts and law from the University of Sydney.

== Career ==
Walker was admitted to the New South Wales bar in 1979 and was appointed senior counsel in 1993. He was president of the New South Wales Bar Association from November 2001 to November 2003, having been vice-president from 1996 to 2001.

Walker is a member of the Council of Law Reporting for New South Wales, and was the editor of the NSW Law Reports from 2006 to 2018. He is a patron of the State Library of New South Wales as a foundation senior fellow and has been a member of the NSW Health Clinical Ethics Advisory Panel since 2003. He was governor of the Law Foundation of NSW from 1996 to 2007, and Special Commissioner of Inquiry for the NSW government into Sydney Ferries in 2007. He was a foundation member and has been director of the Australian Academy of Law since 2007.

He was a leading legal counsel representing tobacco companies in their unsuccessful fight against the Australian government's plain packaging legislation.

In April 2011 Walker was appointed as the Independent National Security Legislation Monitor. In 2015 Walker said that a proposed change to Australia's citizenship laws to give the Minister for Immigration the power to strip citizenship from people who support terrorism was unconstitutional. He said this was a misquote of the INSLM 2014 report by Prime Minister Tony Abbott. In a 2015 interview with Lateline, Walker noted the Australian "habit of seeing a problem and passing a law about it".

In 2018–19 Walker oversaw the South Australian Royal Commission into the Murray-Darling Basin. The report was damning of the maladministration that characterised the overseeing Murray-Darling Basin Authority, describing their decision-making as “incomprehensible” and “indefensible”.

In 2019 Walker successfully acted in the appeal to the High Court of Australia of Cardinal George Pell, whose child sex abuse convictions were overturned on 7 April 2020.

In April 2020 Walker was appointed to a Special Commission of Inquiry to "investigate all matters and agencies involved with the Ruby Princess' departure and its return to Circular Quay on March 19".

In 2021 Walker had the most appearances in the High Court of Australia, appearing 35 times; that was more than twice the number of hearings as the next busiest, Solicitor-General Stephen Donaghue KC.

== High Court appearances ==
Bell Lawyers Pty Ltd v Pentelow [2019] HCA 29

Pell v The Queen [2020] HCA 12

Workpac Pty Ltd v Rossato [2021] HCA 23

Schokman v CCIG Investments Pty Ltd [2023] HCA 21

Ravbar v Commonwealth of Australia [2025] HCA 25

Gray v Lavan (A Firm) [2025] HCA 42

(note: list may not be exhaustive)
