= Council of Law Reporting for New South Wales =

Body for the reporting of court decisions in New South Wales

The Council of Law Reporting for New South Wales publishes the NSW Law Reports, the official reports of the courts of New South Wales. Its offices are located in Pitt Street, Sydney.

The statutory body was defined under the New South Wales legislation titled the Council of Law Reporting Act 1969 No 59. The Minister responsible is the Attorney General of New South Wales. According to the legislation the Council of Law Reporting for New South Wales is to consist of the Attorney General, Solicitor General, the President of the Council of the New South Wales Bar Association, President of the Law Society of New South Wales as well as seven people appointed by the Governor of New South Wales.

The main function of the body is to report on judicial decisions. These reports are then used by the legal profession and the judiciary. Reports are to be as accurate as possible, collated efficiently as well as produced in a timely and cost-effective manner.
