= Henry Phillimore =

English judge

Sir Henry Josceline Phillimore, OBE, PC (25 December 1910 – 4 June 1974) was an English barrister and judge, who served as a Lord Justice of Appeal from 1968 to 1974.

== Biography ==
Henry Phillimore was the son of Charles Augustus Phillimore, a partner at Coutts Bank. His father's cousin was the prominent judge Walter Phillimore, 1st Baron Phillimore, himself the son of the judge Sir Robert Phillimore, 1st Baronet and grandson of the lawyer Joseph Phillimore. He was educated at Eton College, where he was an Oppidan, and Christ Church, Oxford, where he took second-class honours in Greats. He was called to the bar by the Middle Temple in 1934. He was the pupil of Edward Pearce, and after his pupillage joined his chambers. He joined the Western circuit and acquired a varied practice.

He joined the Territorial Army as a gunner in July 1939, and was commissioned in December the same year. After serving in the Norwegian Campaign in 1940, he joined the Prisoner of War Department at the War Office. He attended the Yalta Conference in 1944. The following year, he was promoted colonel and was appointed continental secretary of the British War Crimes Executive. He then served as leading junior counsel of the British prosecution team at the Nuremberg Trials in 1945–46. He was appointed OBE in 1946.

After the Nuremberg Trials, Phillimore returned to his old chambers. He was Recorder of Poole between 1946–54 and Recorder of Winchester between 1954 and 1959. He took silk in 1952.

In 1959, Phillimore was appointed a Justice of the High Court and assigned to the Probate, Divorce and Admiralty Division, receiving the customary knighthood. In 1962 he was transferred to the Queen's Bench Division on the retirement of Mr Justice Hilbery. In 1968, he was promoted to the Court of Appeal, on the elevation of Lord Justice Diplock to the House of Lords, and was sworn of the Privy Council. He retired in April 1974 and died two months later.

Phillimore was a member of the Royal Commission on Assizes and Quarter Sessions, which recommended their abolition, between 1967 and 1969, and was chairman of the Committee on Contempt of Court from 1971 to 1974. The report of the committee, sometimes known as the Phillimore Report, led to the Contempt of Court Act 1981.

== Family ==
Phillimore married Katharine Mary, daughter of Lieutenant-Commander L. C. Maude-Roxby, in 1938; they had two daughters.
