= Restitution and unjust enrichment =

Legal remedy taking away a benefit wrongfully obtained

Restitution and unjust enrichment is the field of law relating to gains-based recovery. In contrast with damages (the law of compensation), restitution is a claim or remedy requiring a defendant to give up benefits wrongfully obtained. Liability for restitution is primarily governed by the "principle of unjust enrichment": A person who has been unjustly enriched at the expense of another is required to make restitution.

Where an individual is unjustly enriched, modern common law imposes an obligation upon the recipient to make restitution, subject to defences such as change of position and the protection of bona fide purchasers from contrary equitable title. Liability for an unjust enrichment arises irrespective of wrongdoing on the part of the recipient, though it may affect available remedies. Restitution can also be ordered for wrongs (also called "waiver of tort" because election of remedies historically occurred when first filing a suit). This may be treated as a distinct basis for restitution, or it may be treated as a subset of unjust enrichment.

Unjust enrichment is not to be confused with illicit enrichment, which is a legal concept referring to the enjoyment of an amount of wealth by a person that is not justified by reference to their lawful income.

== History ==
=== Roman law ===
This principle derives from late Roman law, as stated in the Latin maxim attributed to Sextus Pomponius, Jure naturae aequum est neminem cum alterius detrimentum et injuria fieri locupletiorem ("By natural law it is just that no one should be enriched by another's loss or injury"). In civil law systems, it is also referred to as enrichment without cause or unjustified enrichment.

Its history can be traced back to the Corpus Iuris Civilis. While the concept was unknown in classical Roman law, Roman legal compilers eventually enunciated the principle of unjustified enrichment based on two actions of the classical Roman period—the condictio and the actio de in rem verso.

The condictio authorized recovery by the plaintiff of a certain object or money in the hands of the defendant, where the property had been given mistakenly, illegally, or for a frustrated or otherwise invalid reason. Under the condictio, the plaintiff was regarded as a borrower charged with returning the object or money. For the actio de in rem verso, the plaintiff bore the burden of specifying the cause for his demand, namely, demanding the restitution of assets that had exited the plaintiff's patrimony and entered the defendant’s patrimony through the acts of the defendant’s servants.

The actio de in rem verso gradually expanded to cover instances in which third parties were enriched at the expense of the impoverished obligee, and unjustified enrichment was recognized as a source of obligations under the heading of "quasi-contract".

=== Civil law ===
The modern French and German law on unjustified enrichment is based on the Roman law principles, particularly their interpretation by the French jurist Jean Domat and the German jurist Friedrich Carl von Savigny. Domat developed the French unjustified enrichment principles based on the actio de in rem verso and the Roman concept of causa (cause), such that quasi-contracts became actionable even when they are not normally recognized under Roman law. In German civil law, the concept of unjustified enrichment is considerably broader and addresses issues of restitution and restoration for failed juridical acts.

==== Spain ====
For the School of Salamanca members, like Tomás de Mercado, the prohibition of unjustified enrichment finds directly its source in natural law and the principle of commutative justice. As such, it applied to the entire law of property and contract.

=== Common law ===
The medieval predecessors to the contemporary common law concept of unjust and enrichment were the claims brought in assumpsit and for money had and received. The seminal case was Lord Mansfield's decision in Moses v Macferlan (1760), which imported into the common law notions of equity or conscience from English chancery. Blackstone's Commentaries also endorsed this approach, citing Moses.

In the late 19th century, a group of scholars at Harvard Law School began to revise and critique the common law of unjust enrichment, believing the doctrine to be inconsistent and incoherent. The word 'restitution', as used to describe the concept, was popularised by the American Law Institute's Restatement of Restitution (1931), and by the 1970s, United States law had developed a doctrine of restitution separate from contract and tort. In the United Kingdom, however, academic and judicial treatment of restitution did not become popular until the mid-1980s. The publication of Peter Birks' An Introduction to the Law of Restitution (1985), and his related seminar in the Bachelor of Civil Law degree at the University of Oxford, were hugely influential in the development of English unjust enrichment law. By that time, however, interest in restitution within the United States had largely died out.

== Common law ==
=== England and Commonwealth ===
The principle said to underlie these actions was eventually recognized as unjust enrichment. Subsequent scholarship has sought to expand the explanatory power of the principle of unjust enrichment and it is now often said (albeit not without controversy) to encompass both common law and equitable claims.

In Australian law, actions derived from the common money counts continue to generate only personal remedies. The doctrinal basis of subrogation is not unsettled: it has nothing to do with unjust enrichment.

In Attorney General v Blake, an English court found itself faced with the following claim. The defendant had made a profit somewhere in the region of £60,000 as a direct result of breaching his contract with the claimant. The claimant was undoubtedly entitled to claim compensatory damages but had suffered little or no identifiable loss. It therefore decided to seek restitution for the wrong of breach of contract. The claimant won the case and the defendant was ordered to pay over his profits to the claimant. However, the court was careful to point out that the normal legal response to a breach of contract is to award compensation. An order to make restitution was said to be available only in exceptional circumstances.

==== Australia ====
Whether there is a distinct body of law in Australia known as the law of unjust enrichment is a highly controversial question. In Pavey & Mathews v Paul (1987) 162 CLR 221 the concept of unjust enrichment was expressly endorsed by the High Court of Australia. This was subsequently followed in numerous first instance and appellate decisions, as well as by the High Court itself.

Considerable skepticism about the utility of the concept of unjust enrichment has been expressed in recent years. The equitable basis for the action for money had and received has instead been emphasised and in Australian Financial v Hills [2014] HCA 14 the plurality held that the concept of unjust enrichment was effectively 'inconsistent' with the law of restitution as it had developed in Australia. It is worth noting that the analytic framework had been expressly endorsed by the High Court just two years before in Equuscorp v Haxton [2012] HCA 7. For the moment, the concept of unjust enrichment appears to serve only a taxonomical function.

==== Canada ====
The doctrine of unjust enrichment was definitively established as a fully fledged course of action in Canada in Pettkus v. Becker, 1980 CanLII 22 (SCC), [1980] 2 SCR 834

To establish unjust enrichment, the Plaintiff needs to show: (i) enrichment; (ii) deprivation; (iii) causal connection between enrichment and deprivation; and (iv) absence of juristic justification for the enrichment.

The concept of deprivation and enrichment are extremely broad. Deprivation refers to any loss of money or money's worth in the form of contribution while A is enriched if B contributes to the acquisition of assets in A's name. The causal connection between enrichment and deprivation must be "substantial and direct". The absence of juristic reason is satisfied if a Plaintiff establishes a reason why the benefit ought not be retained, or if the Defendant demonstrates a convincing argument in favour of retention of the property. Remedy for unjust enrichment is frequently an imposition of constructive trust over the property unjustly retained.

=== United States ===
The Restatement (Third) of Restitution and Unjust Enrichment (2011) (“R3RUE”) states that unjust enrichment is a body of legal obligations under the common law and equity – but separate from tort and contract law – that is available to take away an enrichment that lacks an adequate legal basis. A claim of restitution for unjust enrichment “results from a transaction that the law treats as ineffective to work a conclusive alteration in ownership rights.” The restatements of restitution advocate for treating restitution as a unified and cohesive body of law, rather than comprising a variety of miscellaneous legal and equitable claims, remedies, and doctrines such as quantum meruit, quantum valebant, account of profits, quasi-contract, constructive trust, and money had and received.

The enactment of the Federal Rules of Civil Procedure in 1938 merged procedures for law and equity and replaced the common-law forms of action with a single civil action. This has, to some extent, blurred differences between legal and equitable restitution, and obscured awareness of legal restitution's origin in the action of assumpsit.

==== Books on American restitution ====
- Restatement (Third) of Restitution and Unjust Enrichment. St. Paul, MN: American Law Institute. 2011.
- Kull, Andrew; Farnsworth, Ward (2018). Restitution and Unjust Enrichment: Cases and Notes. New York: Wolters Kluwer. ISBN 978-1-5438-0090-6.
- Farnsworth, Ward (2014). Restitution: Liability for Unjust Enrichment. University of Chicago Press. ISBN 978-0-226-14402-3.
- Palmer, George E. (1978). The Law of Restitution. Boston: Little, Brown & Co.
- Restatement of Restitution. St. Paul, MN: American Law Institute. 1937.
- Keener, William A. (1893). A Treatise on the Law of Quasi-Contracts. New York: Baker, Voorhis & Co.

=== Comparative law ===
The common law of restitution and unjust enrichment in the American and Anglo-Commonwealth traditions differ significantly for historical, political, and jurisprudential reasons. Whereas the leading source of law on restitution in the United States is the American Law Institute's Restatement, the leading texts in England and Wales are the textbooks of analytical legal scholars from the University of Oxford, including Peter Birks, Gareth Jones, Robert Goff, Ewan McKendrick, Andrew Burrows, and Robert Stevens.

In Birks's conceptual analysis of the English law of obligations, bases of liability and remedy can be distinguished based on "causative events": the basis of contract is the consent of parties; tort and other legal wrongs (e.g. in some constructive trust and disgorgement cases), breaches of duty; and restitution, unjust enrichment. Birks also argues that restitutionary remedies can be logically divided into proprietary (in rem) and personal (in personam) categories, with the former being governed by more rigid rules than the latter. In contrast, American jurisprudence in the late 20th century, dominated by legal realism, abandoned the private-public law distinction, eroded the relevance of proprietary and personal rights in adjudication, and distrusted the use of analytic legal reasoning and doctrinal categorisation. Rather, the paradigm of judicial reasoning in US academic scholarship centred around extra-legal factors, such as economic efficiency, morality, and political theory.

== Civil law ==
=== Belgium ===
The reception of unjust enrichment into Belgian law has been upheld multiple times by the Court of Cassation, which has ruled that unjust enrichment is a general principle of law. The Court has stated that the legal basis for unjust enrichment is equity (ius aequum).

According to the Court, five elements constitute unjust enrichment:

1. an enrichment;
2. an impoverishment;
3. a connection between the enrichment and the impoverishment;
4. an absence of a basis (sine causa) of the enrichment;
5. a person alleging unjust enrichment may not simultaneously do so for benevolent intervention (negotiorum gestio) or undue payment (solutio indebiti).

=== Scotland ===
The law of unjust enrichment in England rapidly developed during the second half of the 20th century. It has been heavily influenced by the writings of legal scholars from the universities of Oxford and Cambridge.

In Scotland, the law developed in a piecemeal fashion through the twentieth century, culminating in three pivotal cases in the late 1990s. The most crucial of these was Shilliday v Smith, in which Lord Roger essentially laid the bedrock for what is now considered modern Scots unjustified enrichment law, bringing together the fragmented law into one framework, drawing from the principles of Roman Law upon which Scots Law as a whole is based (note the term "unjustified" is preferred to "unjust" in Scotland). Unjustified enrichment is more established as a fundamental part of the Scots law of obligations than unjust enrichment is in English law.

== See also ==
- Indebitatus assumpsit, the historical form of action for asserting a quasi-contract in common law, especially by asserting the "common counts," such as:
  - Money had and received
  - Quantum meruit
  - Quantum valebant
- Equitable remedies for restitution include:
  - Account of profits
  - Constructive trust
  - Equitable tracing
- Leading scholars on the English law of unjust enrichment:
  - Robert Goff, Baron Goff of Chieveley
  - Professor Gareth Jones
  - Professor Peter Birks
  - Professor Andrew Burrows
  - Professor Graham Virgo
  - Professor Charles Mitchell
- Suspended sentence
- Transformative justice
- Property restitution in Latvia

== Sources ==
- Decock, Wim (2013). Theologians and Contract Law: The Moral Transformation of the Ius commune (ca. 1500-1650). Leiden/Boston: Martinus Nijhoff Publishers. ISBN 978-90-04-23285-3.
- Saiman, Chaim (2008-03-01). "Restitution in America: Why the US Refuses to Join the Global Restitution Party". Oxford Journal of Legal Studies. 28 (1): 99–126. doi:10.1093/ojls/gqn003. ISSN 0143-6503.
