= Slade's Case =

Case in English contract law that ran from 1596 to 1602

Slade's case
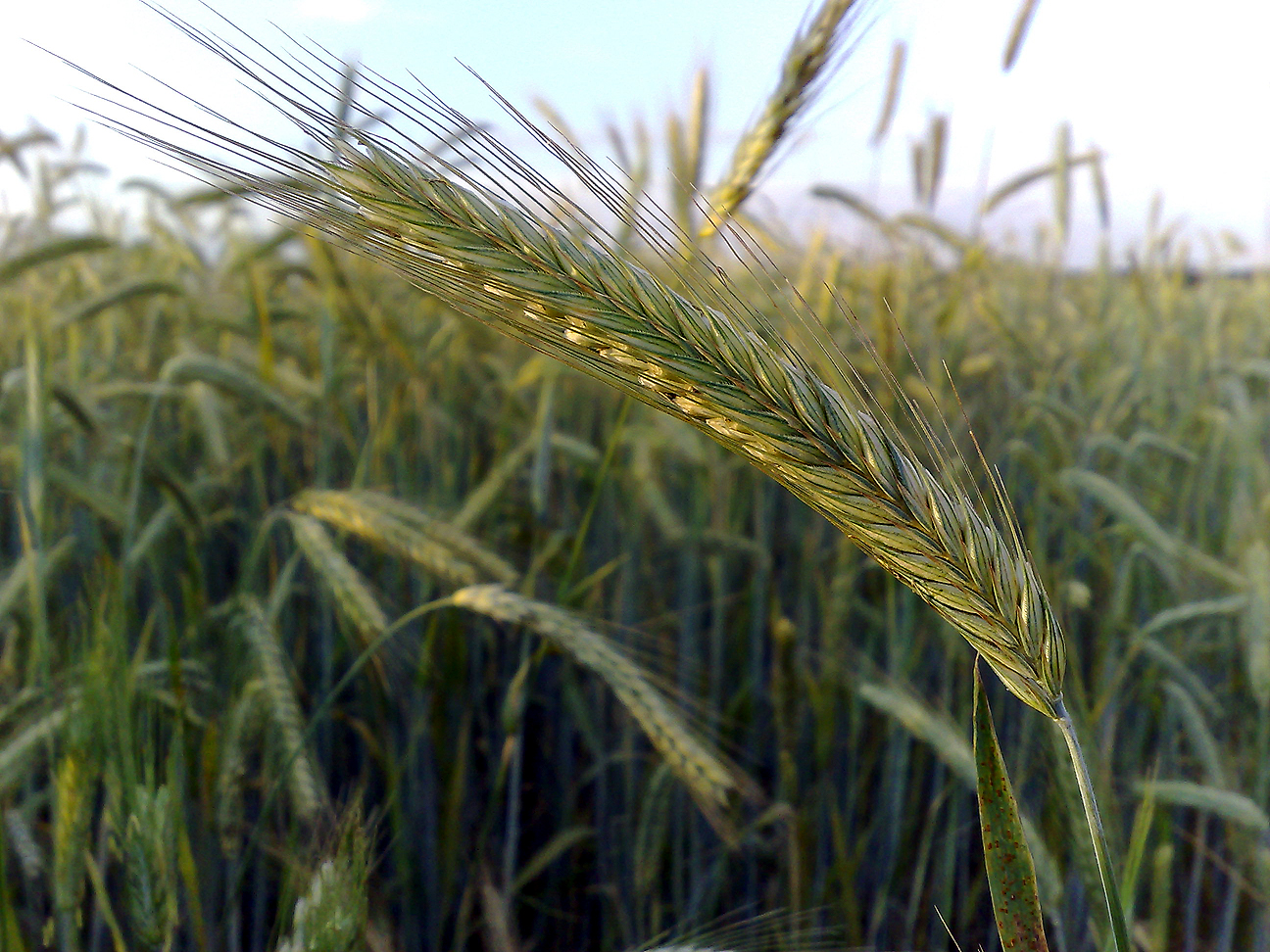
- Court: Court of Exchequer Chamber
- Full case name: Slade v Morley
- Decided: Trinity term, 1602
- Citations: Slade's case (1598) 4 Co Rep 92b, 76 ER 1074 (1602); Slade v Morley (1792) Yelv 21, 80 ER 15; Slade v Morley (1688) MooKB 433, 72 ER 677

Case opinions
- Lord Popham CJ

Keywords
- Assumpsit, contract, action for debt

Slade's Case (or Slade v. Morley) was a case in English contract law that ran from 1596 to 1602. Under the medieval common law, claims seeking the repayment of a debt or other matters could only be pursued through a writ of debt in the Court of Common Pleas, a problematic and archaic process. By 1558 the lawyers had succeeded in creating another method, enforced by the Court of King's Bench, through the action of assumpsit, which was technically for deceit. The legal fiction used was that by failing to pay after promising to do so, a defendant had committed deceit, and was liable to the plaintiff. The conservative Common Pleas, through the appellate court the Court of Exchequer Chamber, began to overrule decisions made by the King's Bench on assumpsit, causing friction between the courts.

In Slade's Case, a case under assumpsit, which was brought between judges of the Common Pleas and King's Bench, was transferred to the Court of Exchequer Chamber where the King's Bench judges were allowed to vote. The case dragged on for five years, with the judgment finally being delivered in 1602 by the Chief Justice of the King's Bench, John Popham. Popham ruled that assumpsit claims were valid, a decision called a "watershed" moment in English law, with archaic and outdated principles being overwritten by the modern and effective assumpsit, which soon became the main cause of action in contract cases. This is also seen as an example of judicial legislation, with the courts making a revolutionary decision Parliament had failed to make.

== Background ==
Under the medieval common law, there was only one way to resolve a dispute seeking the repayment of money or other contract matters; a writ of debt, which only the Court of Common Pleas could hear. This was archaic, did not work against the executors of a will and involved precise pleading; a minor flaw in the documents put to the court could see the case thrown out. By the middle of the 16th century, lawyers had attempted to devise an alternative using the action of assumpsit, which was technically a type of trespass due to deceit. The argument was based on the idea that there was an inherent promise in a contract to pay the money, and that by failing to pay the defendant had deceived the plaintiff. By 1558 the lawyers had succeeded, with the Court of King's Bench agreeing to hear cases under this piece of legal fiction. The judges of the Common Pleas, however, a more traditional group, rejected this argument and only accepted cases where an actual promise had been made in addition to the contract.

The action of assumpsit had several advantages over a writ of debt; the plaintiff could count on always having a jury, while in writs of debt the defendant could rely on wager of law, where he produced twelve people to swear he did not owe the plaintiff money and had the case dismissed. In addition, it worked for executory agreements, not just normal contracts. In 1585 a new form of the Court of Exchequer Chamber was set up, an appellate court where the Common Pleas judges held a majority, and regularly began to reverse King's Bench judgments which were based on assumpsit. This, and the conflict between the King's Bench and the Common Pleas as a whole, was problematic; a plaintiff at assizes could not be sure which sort of judge his case would come before, lending uncertainty to the law. Boyer suggests that, in this environment, the Chief Justice of the King's Bench John Popham deliberately provoked the Common Pleas to resolve the matter, and did so through Slade's Case.

== Facts ==
John Slade was a grain merchant, who claimed that Humphrey Morley had agreed to buy a crop of wheat and rye from him, paying £16, and had reneged on the agreement. He brought the case before the assizes in 1596, where it was heard by two judges; one of the Common Pleas, and one of the King's Bench. It was heard under assumpsit, and the jury found that Morley indeed owed Slade money. Before a judgment could be issued, Popham had the case transferred to an older version of the Court of Exchequer Chamber, which, sitting in Serjeant's Inn, allowed the King's Bench judges to sit.

Edward Coke was counsel for Slade, arguing that the King's Bench had the power to hear assumpsit actions, along with Laurence Tanfield, while Francis Bacon and John Doddridge represented Morley. The quality of legal argument was high; Bacon was a "skillful, subtle intellect" capable of distinguishing the precedent brought up by Coke, while Doddridge, a member of the Society of Antiquaries, knew the records even better than Coke did. Coke, rather than directly confronting opposing counsel, made a twofold argument; firstly, that the fact that the King's Bench had been allowed to hear assumpsit actions for so long meant that it was acceptable, based on institutional inertia, and second that, on the subject of assumpsit being used for breaches of promise, that the original agreement included an implied promise to make payment.

The case continued for five years; at one point, the judges let the matter continue for three years because they could not reach a decision. Eventually, in November 1602, Popham issued a judgment on behalf of the court which stated "Firstly, that every contract executory implies in itself a promise or assumpsit. Secondly, that although upon such a contract an action of debt lies, the plaintiff may well have an action in the case upon the assumpsit." Coke, in his report of the case (published in 1604) reports that the judgment was unanimous, while more modern commentators such as Boyer assert that it was narrow, most likely 6 to 5, with the dividing line being between the King's Bench judges and Common Pleas.

== Judgment ==
Lord Popham CJ held that Slade could sue, and was successful. He said the following.

3. It was resolved, that every contract executory imports in itself an assumpsit, for when one agrees to pay money, or to deliver anything, thereby he promises to pay, or deliver it; and therefore when one sells any goods to another, and agrees to deliver them at a day to come, and the other in consideration thereof promises to pay so much money to the other, in this case both parties may have an action of debt, or an action upon the case on assumpsit, for the mutual executory agreement of both parties imports in it self reciprocal action upon the case, as well as action of debt, and therewith agrees the judgment in Reade and Norwoods Case, Pl. Comm. 128.
4. It was resolved, that the plaintiff in this action upon the case upon assumpsit shall not recover only damages for the special loss (if any be) which he has, but also for the whole debt, so that recovery or barre in this action shall be a good bar in an action of debt brought upon the same contract; so vice versa, a recovery or bar in an action of debt is a good bar in an action upon the case upon assumpsit.

== Significance ==
The impact of the case was immediate and overwhelming. Ibbetson considers Slade's Case to be a "watershed" moment, in which the archaic and conservative form of law was overwritten by a modern, more efficient method. Assumpsit became the dominant form of contract cases, with the door "opened wide" to plaintiffs; Boyer suggests this was perhaps "too wide". In his Commentaries on the Laws of England, William Blackstone explained that this was the reason why the Statute of Frauds was subsequently passed in 1677:

Some agreements indeed, though ever so expressly made, are deemed to be of so important a nature, that they ought not to rest in verbal promise only, which cannot be proved but by the memory (which sometimes will induce the perjury) of witnesses.

The case is particularly notable as an example of judicial legislation, with the judges significantly modernising the law and moving it forward in a way Parliament had not considered. As a side impact, Coke's arguments were the first to define consideration. The conservative outlook of the Common Pleas soon changed; after the death of Edmund Anderson, the more activist Francis Gawdy became Chief Justice of the Common Pleas, and other Common Pleas judges, many of whom were uncertain but had followed Anderson's lead in the case, changed their minds.

== Bibliography ==
- Blackstone, William (1771). "9: Of injuries to personal property". Commentaries on the Laws of England. Vol. III. Dublin: J. Exshaw, etc. pp. 144–166. OCLC 04178791.
- Boyer, Allen D. (2003). Sir Edward Coke and the Elizabethan Age. Stanford University Press. ISBN 0-8047-4809-8.
- Coke, Edward (1777). "Slade's Case". The Reports of Sir Edward Coke. Vol. IV. London: George Wilson. pp. 93–96.
- Ibbetson, David (1984). "Sixteenth Century Contract Law: Slade's Case in Context". Oxford Journal of Legal Studies. 4 (3). Oxford University Press: 295–317. doi:10.1093/ojls/4.3.295. ISSN 0143-6503.(subscription required)
- Sacks, David Harris (2001). "The promise and the contract in early modern England: Slade's case in perspective". In Kahn, Victoria Ann; Hutson, Lorna (eds.). Rhetoric and law in early modern Europe. Yale University Press. ISBN 0-300-08485-4.
- Simpson, A.W.B. (2004). "The Place of Slade's Case in the History of Contract". In Allen D. Boyer (ed.). Law, Liberty and Parliament: Selected Essays on the Writings of Sir Edward Coke. Liberty Fund. ISBN 0-86597-426-8.
