= Quantum valebant =

Quantum valebant is a Latin phrase meaning "as much as they were worth". It is sometimes used in its singular form, quantum valebat, meaning “as much as it was worth". It is a common count at law very similar to quantum meruit. The two legal actions differ only in that quantum meruit is used to recover the reasonable value of services rendered, while quantum valebant is used to recover the reasonable value of goods sold and delivered. This count is considered a type of assumpsit.

== Case law ==
The Supreme Court of California has held:

Although such an action is one at law, it is governed by principles of equity. It may be brought 'wherever one person has received money which belongs to another, and which "in equity and good conscience," or in other words, in justice and right, should be returned. ... The plaintiff's right to recover is governed by principles of equity, although the action is one at law.

An illustration of a case in which quantum valebant was allowed is In re Monitor Prods. Co.. In that case, the United States Navy had entered into a contract to buy 160 electronic oscillator units at a specified price. The Navy later decided that it wanted 40 more units. Monitor, the subcontractor, told the Navy's project engineer that it needed substantial price increase for the additional 40 units as well as reimbursement for cost overruns which it was incurring in producing the initial 160 units; otherwise it would have to cease production. No additional formal contract was signed, but the project went ahead and Monitor provided the 200 units. The Navy declined to pay any additional amount, although Monitor insisted that it was induced to incur the additional costs by a representative of the Navy (the project engineer), who appeared to have the authority to commit the Government.

The Comptroller General of the United States held that

the courts and our Office have recognized that in appropriate circumstances payment may be made for services rendered on a quantum meruit basis (the reasonable value of work or labor), or for goods furnished on a quantum valebat basis (the reasonable value of goods sold and delivered).

According to the ruling, the Navy ratified an agreement for the extra units and cost overrun. Therefore, "Monitor's claim may be paid to the extent that the value of the items furnished exceeds any compensation which Monitor may have received from" the prime contractor for the work.
