= NSW Law Reports =

Law Reports of Australia

The New South Wales Law Reports (NSWLR) are the authorised reports of the superior courts of New South Wales, Australia. The reports are published by the Council of Law Reporting for New South Wales.

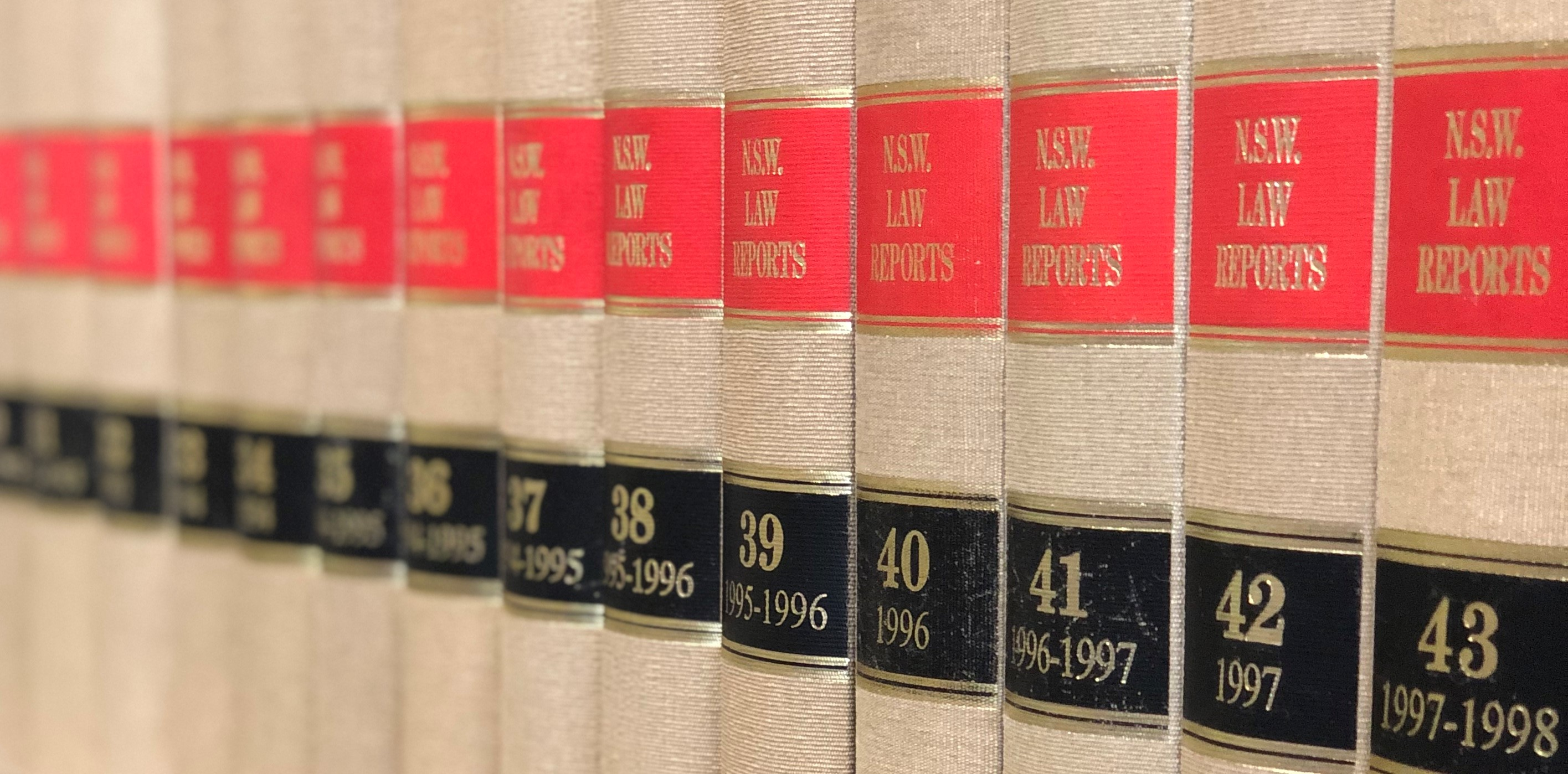
Bound volumes of the NSWLRs.

Cases reported in the NSWLR are selected by the Editor on the basis of their significance in relation to the interpretation, development or application of the law in New South Wales. Of the thousands of judgments delivered each year by the Supreme Court of New South Wales (including the Court of Appeal and Court of Criminal Appeal) only a fraction are selected for reporting.

Every report contains a headnote drafted by a practising barrister or solicitor, reviewed by an Assistant Editor and approved by the relevant court. Counsel involved in a case are also asked for comment. Each headnote includes catchwords, appearances, a summary of facts and holdings. The catchwords give a summary classification of the matters dealt with in the case. The holdings are the grounds for decision. All citations, quotations and references in the text of a judgment are checked, and corrected if necessary, and the text conformed to the council's own style guide by the council's editorial staff.

As a result of the careful selection of only significant cases for reporting, the preparation of concise and accurate headnotes, and the careful proofing of judgments, the NSWLR are a very valuable resource. They are quite different from collections of the vast number of unreported decisions that are made freely available by New South Wales courts.

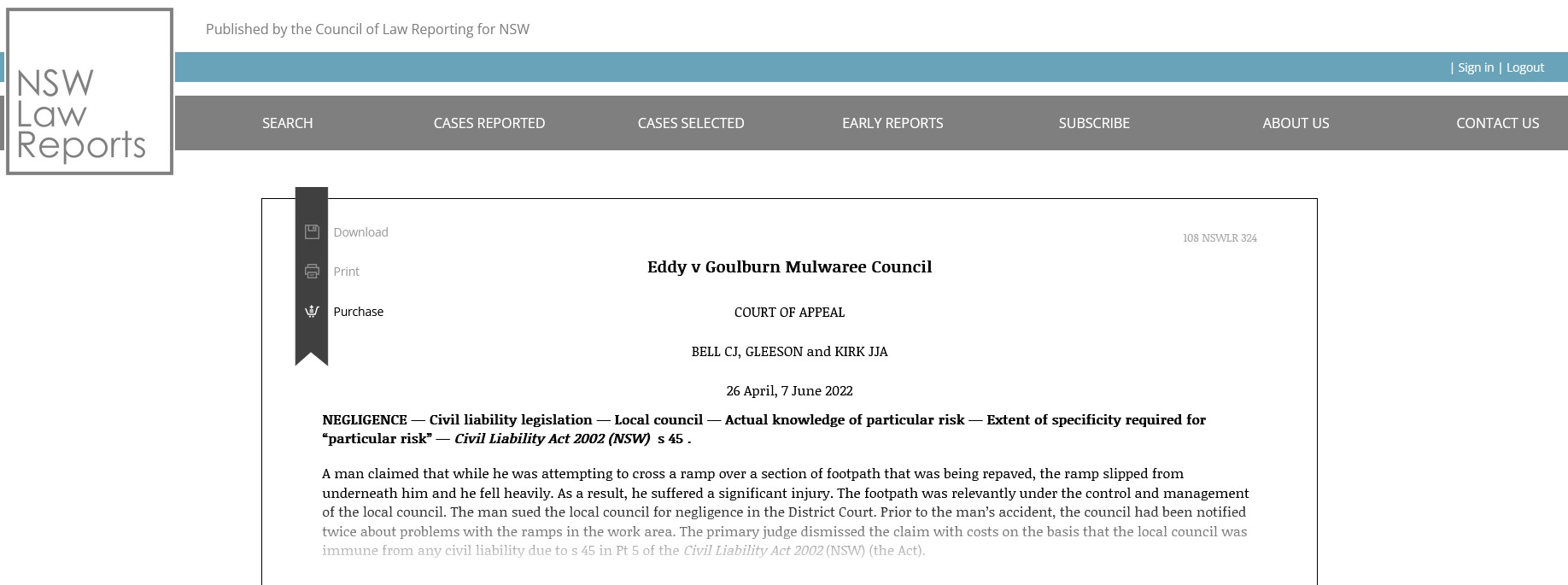
A report on the NSWLR website.

The NSWLR are published in hard copy and electronically. The hard copies take the form of 12 soft cover parts and 3 bound volumes per year (with 4 parts per volume). They are available as an annual print subscription from the council. Electronic copies of single cases are available for purchase from the NSWLR website on a pay-per-view basis for a modest fee. In addition, the whole of the NSWLR series is licensed to LexisNexis and Thomson Reuters for publication as part of their online platforms in Australia. The council offers online subscriptions to international subscribers.

The NSWLR began in 1970, following the establishment of the Council of Law Reporting by the Council of Law Reporting Act 1969 (NSW). They replaced the State Reports, New South Wales (which began in 1901) as the authorised reports in New South Wales.

The current Editor of the NSWLR is Perry Herzfeld SC who has held the position since 2022. Previous editors have been:

- Francis Hutley QC (1971 to 1972);
- Kenneth Gee QC (1972 to 1974);
- Robert Howell QC (1974 to 1979);
- Dyson Heydon KC (1980 to 2000);
- Naida Haxton (2000 to 2006);
- Bret Walker SC (2006 to 2018); and
- Dr Elisabeth Peden SC (2018 to 2022).

== See also ==
- List of Law Reports in Australia
- Australian legal system
