= Assumpsit =

Form of action at common law

Assumpsit ("he has undertaken", from Latin, assumere), or more fully, action in assumpsit, was a form of action at common law used to enforce what are now called obligations arising in tort and contract; and in some common law jurisdictions, unjust enrichment. The origins of the action can be traced to the 14th century, when litigants seeking justice in the royal courts turned from the writs of covenant and debt to the trespass on the case.

== History ==
=== Fragmentation of actions for breach of agreement ===
In the early days of the English common law, agreements were enforced in local courts. Where one wished to enforce an agreement in the royal courts, it was necessary to fit one's claim within a form of action. In the 13th and 14th centuries the forms of action for the enforcement of agreements were covenant, debt, detinue, and account. These were all writs in the praecipe form, meaning that they commanded the defendant to perform an act: for example, to keep a promise; to yield up a sum of money or chattel unjustly withheld; or to render accounts.

These actions were subject to various limitations. For example, by the middle of the 14th century at the latest, it was necessary for a plaintiff in an action of covenant to have a deed. In an action of debt sur contract, a deed was not necessary, but a defendant was able to wage his law and the sum claimed had to be a sum certain fixed at the date of contract. Such rules could easily work hardship. What if a promisor (A) orally agreed to supply grain to a promisee (B), but failed to do so? In such a case, B would be unable to bring a writ of covenant due to the absence of a deed. B would instead bring debt sur contract, bringing a number of transaction witnesses. But what if A elected wager of law and simply hired his eleven oath-helpers?

=== Emergence of assumpsit ===
Litigants began to turn from the praecipe writs of covenant and debt to the ostensurus quare writ of trespass. By the middle of the 14th century, the royal courts were recognising that a writ of trespass would lie even without an allegation that the defendant had acted vi et armis contra pacem regis (with force and arms against the King's Peace). This action became known as trespass on the case.

To bring the claim within trespass on the case, the plaintiff would characterise the defendant's breach of agreement as a wrong. During the 15th century, the received learning was that an action on the case did not lie for mere inaction ("nonfeasance"). By the beginning of this 16th century, this was no longer the case. Provided a plaintiff could show that the defendant was guilty of misfeasance, deceit, or the plaintiff had made a pre-payment, the plaintiff could bring assumpsit for nonfeasance.

By the beginning of the 16th century, lawyers recognised a distinct species of action on the case known as assumpsit, which had become the typical phrase in the pleadings.

=== Assumpsit in lieu of debt ===
The question that arose in the 16th century was whether assumpsit could be brought in lieu of debt. For a plaintiff, assumpsit was the more desirable course: the defendant would not be able to elect to wage his law as he would in debt sur contract.

In order to bring assumpsit, the plaintiff would plead that, the defendant being indebted to the plaintiff, the defendant had later promised to pay the debt. In short, the plaintiff would separate the existence of the debt (which generated an action of debt sur contract) from a promise to pay the debt (which would generate an assumpsit for nonfeasance). This form of pleading gave rise to the name of the action: indebitatus assumpsit.

The practice of the King's Bench and the Court of Common Pleas differed during the course of the 16th century. In the King's Bench, it was not necessary for the plaintiff to prove the subsequent promise. The Common Pleas disagreed. Matters came to a head in Slade's Case in 1602. The case effectively established that assumpsit could be used in lieu of debt: the law would imply a promise to pay the debt from the existence of the debt itself.

Slade's Case effectively put an end to the use of debt sur contract, and with it wager of law. Of course, it was not possible to bring assumpsit where the proper action was debt sur obligation (that is, debt on a deed or bond).

=== Common counts ===
Claims in actions of assumpsit can be divided into:

- (a) common or indebitatus assumpsit, brought usually on an implied promise, and
- (b) special or express assumpsit, founded on an express promise.

Where a plaintiff brought assumpsit in lieu of debt sur contract, it was necessary for the plaintiff to specify how the antecedent debt had arisen. It was insufficient for the plaintiff to merely allege that, being indebted, the defendant promised to pay. This gave rise to the "common counts": common ways of pleading how the debt arose. Where assumpsit was brought in lieu of debt, the plaintiff's action was for a liquidated sum. In contrast, where a plaintiff brought special assumpsit, the action was for an unliquidated sum assessed by the civil jury.

Examples of the common counts include:

- For goods sold ("quantum valebant");
- For work done ("quantum meruit");
- For money lent;
- For money due on an account stated;
- For money laid out to the use of the defendant; and
- For money had and received to the plaintiff's use.

By the 18th and 19th centuries, the action of assumpsit was used to enforce both contractual and quasi-contractual claims. The recognition in Slade's Case that the law would import or imply a promise to pay the debt paved the way for other implications.

- In some cases, such as actions for a reasonable remuneration for services provided to the defendant at the defendant's request (a quantum meruit), the implication might be a true reflection of reality. If so, in modern terms, this is simply an action in contract for breach of an implied term.
- In other cases, however, the implication of a promise to pay was wholly fictitious. For example, where A mistakenly paid money to B, A would bring an action for money had and received to the plaintiff's use. In such a case, the law would imply a promise by B to pay the debt. In modern terms, this is an action in unjust enrichment: B is enriched by the receipt of money at the expense of A in circumstances which are 'unjust' (viz., that A's intention to benefit B is vitiated by the mistake).

== Abolition of the forms of action ==
The Common Law Procedure Act 1852 abolished the common law forms of action in England and Wales. Furthermore, assumpsit as a form of action became obsolete in the United Kingdom after the passing of the Judicature Acts of 1873 and 1875.

In the United States, assumpsit, like the other forms of action, became obsolete in the federal courts after the adoption of the Federal Rules of Civil Procedure in 1938. Thirty-five states have moved to rules similar to the FRCP (see Civil procedure in the United States), which have replaced the various forms of action with the civil action. However, many states continue to recognize assumpsit as a common law or statutory cause of action or allow the use of the old "common counts" as causes of action. For example, California has a special "common counts" cause of action form (to be attached to an optional form complaint) based directly on the old common counts that were pleaded in assumpsit.

== Modern significance ==
The traces of the law relating to assumpsit are still felt today, particularly in the law of contract and unjust enrichment. For example, consideration is only necessary in relation to simple contracts. Where a claimant brings an action in contract for non-performance of a promise contained in a deed, there is no need to show that the claimant supplied consideration for the promise. The reason for this is historical: where there was no deed, the correct action was assumpsit for nonfeasance; in the latter, in debt sur obligation. These were two distinct forms of action with their own distinct procedural requirements.

In the law of unjust enrichment, reference is still made to actions for money had and received and quantum meruit. The practice is often deprecated by English unjust enrichment scholars but is frequently encountered in Australia.
