= Estovers =

Allowance out of an estate

In English law, an estover is an allowance made to a person out of an estate, or other thing, for their support. The word estover can also mean specifically an allowance of wood that a tenant is allowed to take from the commons, for life or a period of years, for the implements of husbandry, hedges and fences, and for firewood.

== History ==
The word derives from the French estover, estovoir, a verb used as a substantive meaning "that which is necessary". This word is of disputed origin; it has been referred to the Latin stare, to stand, or studere, to desire.

The Old English word for estover was bote or boot, also spelled bot or bót, (literally meaning 'good' or 'profit' and cognate with the word better). The various kinds of estovers were known as house-bote, cart or plough-bote, hedge or hay-bote, and fire-bote. Anglo-Saxon law also imposed "bot" fines in the modern sense of compensation. These rights might be restricted by express covenants. Copyholders had similar rights over the land they occupied and over the waste of the manor, in which case the rights are known as Commons of estovers.

Burrill in his dated A law dictionary and glossary published in New York (1871) states:

ESTOVER. L. Fr. and Eng. [L. Lat estoverium.] An allowance made to a person. See Estoverium. The plural only (estovers) is now used. See Estovers.

...

ESTOVERS. L.Fr. and Eng. [L. Lat. estoveria and more anciently estoverium; from Fr. estouver, estover, or estoffer, to furnish, supply or maintain.]

An allowance made to a person out of an estate, or other thing for their support, as for food and raiment, (in victu et vestitu). Stat, Gloc. c. 4. See Estover, Estoverium. An allowance (more commonly called alimony,) granted to a woman divorced a mensa et thoro, for her support out of her husband's estate. 1 Bl Com. 441.

An allowance of wood made to a tenant for life or years; a liberty of taking necessary wood for the use or furniture of his house or farm from off the land demised to him. 2 Bl Com. 35. 1 Steph. Com. 241, 260. 2 Crabb's Real Prop. 76, § 1044. Bisset on Estates, 276, 277. 4 Kenf's Com. 73. This is the ordinary meaning of the word estovers which are also called in law botes embracing the various kinds of house-bote fire-bote plough-bote and hay-bote See Botes. Estovers are sometimes erroneously confounded with common of estavers (q. v.) and the distinction is not clearly made by Britton in his 60th chapter, De renables estovers.

== See also ==
- Condonation
- Collegatary
- Contorts
- Maronage
