= History of English contract law =

The history of English contract law traces back to its roots in civil law, the lex mercatoria and the Industrial Revolution. Modern English contract law is composed primarily of case law decided by the English courts following the Judicature Acts and supplemented by statutory reform. However, a significant number of legal principles were inherited from recording decisions reaching back to the aftermath of the Norman Invasion.

== Civil law ==
- Plato, The Laws
- Roman law and pacta sunt servanda
- Corpus Juris Civilis

== Norman England ==
- Common law
- Courts of Chancery
- Forms of action

== The Lex Mercatoria's reception ==
- Slade's case (1598) 4 Co Rep 92b, 76 ER 1074 (1602) - Assumpsit
- Bret against JS and his Wife (1653) Cro Eliz 756, 78 ER 987 (1600) - Assumption of responsibility
- Sir Edward Coke
- Lex mercatoria and the Hanseatic League
- Sir John Holt (Chief Justice 1689 to 1710) and Lord Mansfield
- William Blackstone, Commentaries on the Laws of England
- Jeremy Bentham

== Freedom of contract ==
- Laissez faire
- Faust and Christopher Marlowe, The Tragicall History of the Life and Death of Doctor Faustus (1604)
- Robert Browning Pied Piper of Hamelin (1842)
- Indian Contract Act 1872 (c 9)
- Chitty on Contracts by Joseph Chitty, the younger (1796–1838) and called A Practical Treatise on the Law of Contracts not under Seal (1st edn 1826)
- Sir William Anson and Sir Frederick Pollock
- Oliver Wendell Holmes, The Common Law
- Samuel Williston

== Covenant ==
Furrer v Snelling, 1 Rolle 335, 3 Bulstrode 155, Jenk 324, case 38, Michalmass 13 Jac B R, is a contracts and property case, in English law. The case established the ratio that in covenant only damages are recoverable. A tenant entered a covenant for payment of rent of £20 per annum, for 4½ years. However, the case was brought for non-payment of £100 which the plaintiff claimed for the rent. The judge found that "in covenant damages only are to be recovered and this surplus in miscomputing shall be abated", and "where more is demanded than is due... the debt only, is to be recovered".

== Modern regulation ==
- Sidney Webb and Beatrice Webb
- Benjamin N. Cardozo and Arthur Linton Corbin
- Contract of adhesion
- Standard form contract
- Grant Gilmore, The Death of Contract (1974)
- PS Atiyah and Guenter Treitel
- European Communities Act 1972 (UK)
- Unfair Contract Terms Act 1977
- Office of Fair Trading
- European civil code

== See also ==
- English contract law
- History of contract law
