= After-acquired property =

Several concepts in law

After-acquired property has multiple meanings in law.

== Real property ==
In real property law, after-acquired property refers to any interest in land or real estate obtained by a grantor after a deed has already been executed and delivered to a grantee. Under the doctrine of estoppel by deed, if a grantor conveys property they do not yet own and later acquires title to that property, the title automatically passes to the grantee by operation of law. This principle protects buyers and grantees from sellers who attempt to convey more title than they currently hold at the time of the transaction.

== In other areas of law ==
The term "after-acquired property" also arises in the context of bankruptcy, secured transactions, and the law of wills. In this context, "after-acquired property" is simply property which is acquired by a borrower after a security agreement is signed, by a debtor after a bankruptcy case is commenced, or by a testator after a will is made.

In the case of secured transactions, whether the after acquired property becomes part of the collateral pledged by the borrower is dependent upon both the language of the security agreement and § 9-204 of the Uniform Commercial Code.

== See also ==
- After acquired property clause
