= Contortion (disambiguation) =

Contortion is an act of twisting and deforming. Contortion may also refer to:

- Contortion, a performance art
- Contorsion, a concept in differential geometry described by the Contorsion tensor
- an old term for complicated geological folds

Contortions may also refer to:

- James Chance and the Contortions, a musical group

Contort may additionally refer to:

- Contort (law), an informal legal term combining "contract" and "tort"
- Contort, a botanical term for a type of aestivation

== See also ==
- Contortion Spur, a glacier spur in Antarctica
