= Sanctity (disambiguation) =

Sanctity is the condition of being considered sacred.

Sanctity may also refer to:

- Sanctity of life, the idea that life is sacred
- Sanctity (band), a heavy metal band from Asheville, North Carolina
- Madame Sanctity, a Marvel Comics character
- Contract sanctity
