= After acquired property clause =

Provision in a legal contract

An after acquired property clause is a provision in a legal contract that allows the agreement to cover property that may be acquired after the contract has been signed.

== Examples of uses ==
In a mortgage (of real property) or security agreement (of personal property), an after acquired property clause provides that any additional property acquired by the borrower after the mortgage or security agreement is signed will be additional collateral for the obligation. While such provisions can help give these obligations a good rating, they make it difficult to finance growth through new borrowing.

In the insurance industry, an after acquired property clause allows insurance coverage for property the insured obtains after ratification of the policy or contract. This clause may operate only for a temporary period of time during which the insured must notify the insurer of the property so that the insurer can adjust the premiums accordingly. An example is the purchase of a new vehicle; the clause allows the vehicle to be covered for a short period of time until the owner can notify the insurance company of the purchase and provide the vehicle information (along with any vehicles that were traded in and thus to be removed from the policy).

== See also ==
- After-acquired property
- Contract law
- Prenuptial agreement
- Insurance law
- Mortgage law
