= Notcutt v Universal Equipment Co (London) Ltd =

English contract law and UK labour law case

Notcutt v Universal Equipment Co Ltd
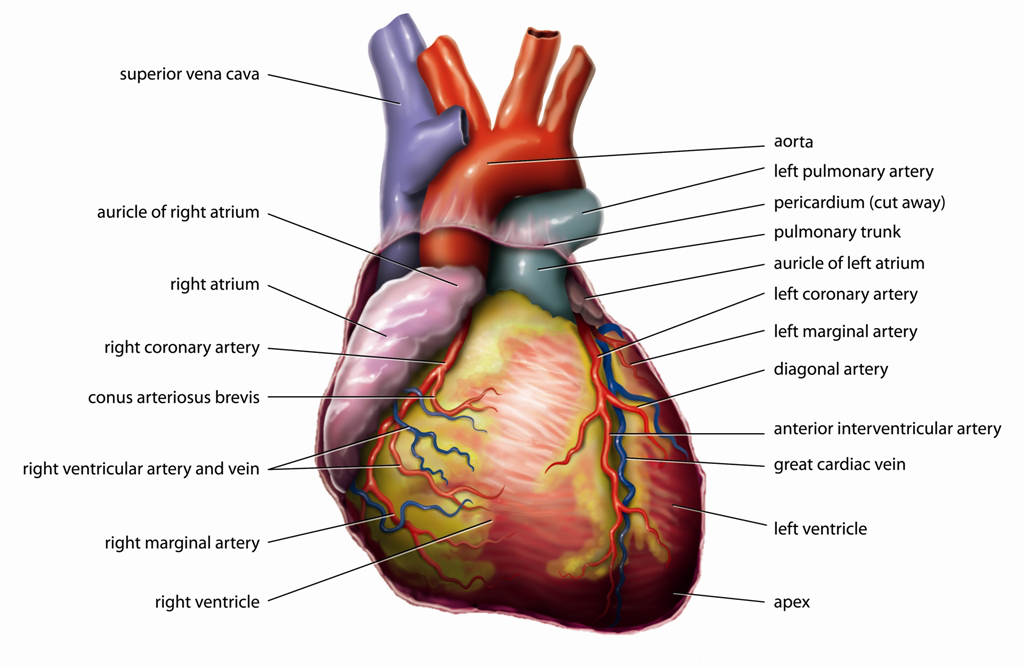
- Court: Court of Appeal
- Citation: [1986] ICR 414

Case opinions
- Dillon LJ

Keywords
- Frustration

Notcutt v Universal Equipment Co (London) Ltd [1986] ICR 414 is an English contract law and UK labour law case, concerning the frustration of an agreement.

== Facts ==
Mr Notcutt had a heart attack. The doctor said it was unlikely he would ever work again. His employers gave the statutory 12-week notice to terminate his contract, but made no payment of wages on the ground that the employee was not entitled to sick pay. Mr Notcutt sued under Employment Protection (Consolidation) Act 1978 section 88(1)(b) which says that normal wages must be paid in the period of notice if an employee is incapable of work due to sickness. Then the employer argued the contract was frustrated.

== Judgment ==
Dillon LJ held the contract was frustrated. He referred to Hare v Murphy Brothers Ltd where Lord Denning MR held a contract was frustrated when a man was sentenced to 12 months prison, on a supposed analogy with someone that was grievously injured an incapacitated in a road accident.

when more than six months later the doctor made his report, both parties appreciated, on the judge’s findings, that he was not going to work again. He was totally incapacitated from performing the contract. That was a situation which, in my judgment, was outside the scope of the contract properly construed. To put it another way, the coronary which left him unable to work again was an unexpected occurrence which made his performance of his contractual obligation – to work – impossible and brought about such a change in the significance of the mutual obligations that the contract, if performed, would be a different thing from that contracted for... Accordingly though I feel much sympathy with the employee in that his working life has been cut short by illness or incapacity, I would dismiss the appeal.

== See also ==
- English contract law
- Frustration in English law
- Igbo v Johnson, Matthey Chemicals Ltd [1986] ICR 505
