= Maritime National Fish Ltd v Ocean Trawlers Ltd =

1935 Judicial Committee of the Privy Council case

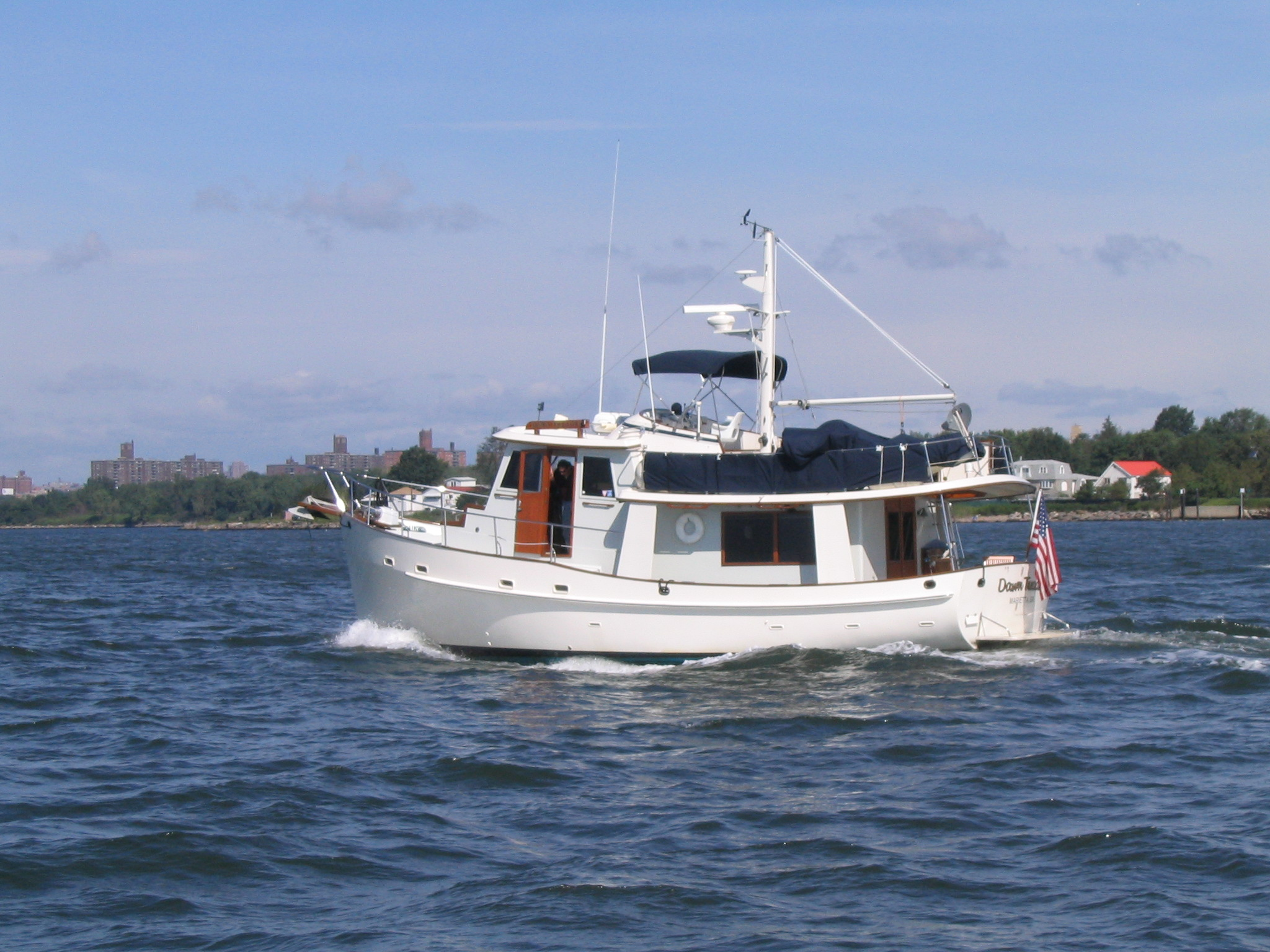
- Court: Judicial Committee of the Privy Council
- Full case name: Maritime National Fish Ltd v Ocean Trawlers Ltd
- Decided: 12 April 1935
- Citations: [1935] UKPC 1, [1935] AC 524; (1935) 51 Ll L Rep 299

Case history
- Appealed from: Supreme Court of Nova Scotia

Court membership
- Judges sitting: Lord Atkin, Lord Tomlin, Lord Macmillan, Lord Wright

Case opinions
- Decision by: Lord Wright

Keywords
- frustration of purpose, foreseeable or self-induced frustration

Maritime National Fish Ltd v Ocean Trawlers Ltd [1935] UKPC 1, is a case on the subject of frustration of purpose, specifically establishing that foreseeable or self-induced frustration will not render a contract frustrated.

== Facts ==
In October 1932, Maritime National Fish contracted to hire St. Cuthbert, a steam trawler fitted with an otter trawl, from Ocean Trawlers Ltd. The hire was to last for twelve months. Both parties knew that the use of such a vessel without a license from the Minister was illegal, under the Fisheries Act (c. 73 Revised Statutes of Canada) 1927. Subsequently, Maritime National Fish applied for five licenses from the Canadian government, for the five trawlers they were using. However, only three were granted. Maritime National Fish did not name the St. Cuthbert from Ocean Trawlers as one of the licensed vessels, and refused to go through with the hire, on the grounds the contract was frustrated. At first instance, Maritime National Fish prevailed, the trial judge holding that it was "not unreasonable to imply a condition to the effect that if the law prohibits the operation of this boat as a trawler the obligation to pay hire will cease".

== Judgment ==
The reversal of this judgment was subsequently upheld by the Privy Council. Maritime National Fish had not been bound not to select the hired trawler, they had merely chosen not to in lieu of only receiving three of the five licenses they had expected:

It is immaterial to speculate why they preferred to put forward for licences the three trawlers which they actually selected. Nor is it material, as between the appellants and the respondents, that the appellants were operating other trawlers to three of which they gave the preference. What matters is that they could have got a licence for the St. Cuthbert if they had so minded. If the case be figured as one in which the St. Cuthbert was removed from the category of privileged trawlers, it was by the appellants' hand that she was so removed, because it was their hand that guided the hand of the Minister in placing the licences where he did and thereby excluding the St. Cuthbert. The essence of "frustration" is that it should not be due to the act or election of the party. There does not appear to be any authority which has been decided directly on this point. There is, however, a reference to the question in the speech of Lord Sumner in Bank Line, Ltd. v. Arthur Capel & Co. What he says is: "One matter I mention only to get rid of it. When the shipowners were first applied to by the Admiralty for a ship they named three, of which the Quito was one and intimated that she was the one they preferred to give up. I think it is now well settled that the principle of frustration of an adventure assumes that the frustration arises without blame or fault on either side."

This establishes clearly that frustration must be the fault of neither party; any supervening event must be unforeseeable and vitiated by entirely external factors.

== See also ==
- Frustration in English law
