= Metropolitan Water Board v Dick, Kerr & Co Ltd =

1918 English contract law

Metropolitan Water Board v Dick Kerr and Co Ltd
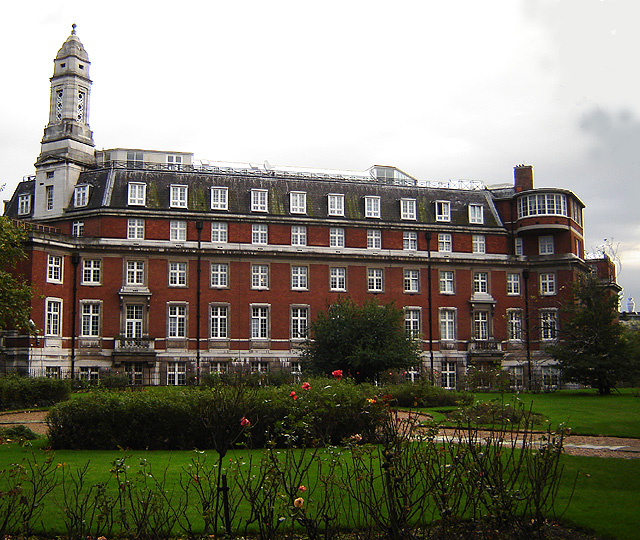
- Court: House of Lords
- Decided: 26 November 1917
- Citation: [1918] AC 119
- Transcript

Court membership
- Judges sitting: Lord Atkinson, Lord Dunedin, Lord Parmoor, Lord Finlay

Keywords
- Frustration

Metropolitan Water Board v Dick Kerr and Co Ltd [1918] AC 119 is an English contract law case, concerning the frustration of an agreement.

== Facts ==
In July 1914, Dick, Kerr & Co agreed to build a reservoir in six years for the Metropolitan Water Board (London). The contract said that Dick, Kerr & Co should apply to the engineer for an extension of time in the event of delay "whatsoever and howsoever occasioned".

Two years later on 21 February 1916, due to the war, the Ministry of Munitions ordered Dick, Kerr & Co to stop work and sell their plant. The MWB subsequently sued Dick Kerr to complete the reservoir.

== Judgment ==
The House of Lords held that the contract was frustrated, because the delay clause was intended to cover temporary difficulties, and not such fundamental changes in the contract's nature.

== See also ==
- English contract law
- Frustration in English law
