= Contorts =

Informal phrase used in contract law

Contorts (arguably) is a portmanteau, or a combination of "contracts" and "torts" originated by Grant Gilmore in his book The Death of Contract. The generally informal term refers to the continual or persistent "tortification" of contract law. In other words, in recent years, principles from tort law increasingly have been applied to contract disputes and incorporated into the general body of contract law.

The basis for "contorts" includes the widespread application of promissory estoppel (as a substitute for consideration) and the awarding of punitive damages in breach of contract claims. At least in certain aspects, strict and rigid conceptions of contract law and contractual relationships have thus been eroded or deemphasized in common law and popular culture.

Alternatively, "contorts" may simply refer to a fusion of contracts and torts law, rather than a process in which one area of the law erodes or overtakes another.

== See also ==
- Collegatary
- Allonge
- Condonation
