= Secured party creditor =

Secured party creditor can refer to:

- Secured transactions in the United States, the use of personal property as loan collateral
- A fraudulent debt-payment scheme promoted in the sovereign citizen/redemption movement
