= Condonation =

Legal defense

Within the legal profession, condonation (or a condonance) is a defence argument sometimes made when an accuser has previously forgiven or chosen to ignore an act about which they are now legally complaining. In some legal jurisdictions, and for certain behaviors, it may prevent the accuser from prevailing. It is most frequently presented during divorce proceedings, though it is also used in other legal contexts.

Condonation is irrelevant to some acts. For example, some jurisdictions prohibit consensual combat (other than in specially-sanctioned sports, such as boxing). In such a jurisdiction, the people arrested for brawling cannot avoid prosecution by condoning one another's assaults.

== Common law ==
In the civil law of the common law legal systems, if a creditor states that they forgive a certain debt, they might be blocked (or estopped) from attempting to collect that same debt at a later date. Condonation would not prevent the creditor from collecting any subsequent or other debts, however.

=== Divorce law ===
Prior to the advent of no-fault divorce statutes, condonation was frequently asserted as a defense to divorce. Although one spouse may have committed an act that justified the other in obtaining a divorce, the other spouse might be deemed to have forgiven the conduct and thus waived the right to sue for divorce. The most typical way in which condonation occurred is if the wronged spouse, with knowledge of the act, voluntarily engaged in sexual relations with the wrongdoer. Critics of the doctrine contended that it discouraged spouses from attempting reconciliation, as one act of sexual intercourse would deprive the wronged spouse of any relief if the spouses were unable to resolve their differences.

== Military law ==
Condonation has historically been a defense to some military crimes, such as desertion, holding that by permitting a soldier to continue or resume their service their commander has constructively pardoned them.

The principle of condonation in military law appears in the "Memorandum on Corporal Punishment" issued by the Duke of Wellington on 4 March 1832:

"The performance of a duty of honour or of trust, after the knowledge of an offence committed by a soldier, ought to convey a pardon for the offence."

== See also ==
- Allonge
- Collegatary
- Contorts
