= Davis Contractors Ltd v Fareham UDC =

English contract law case

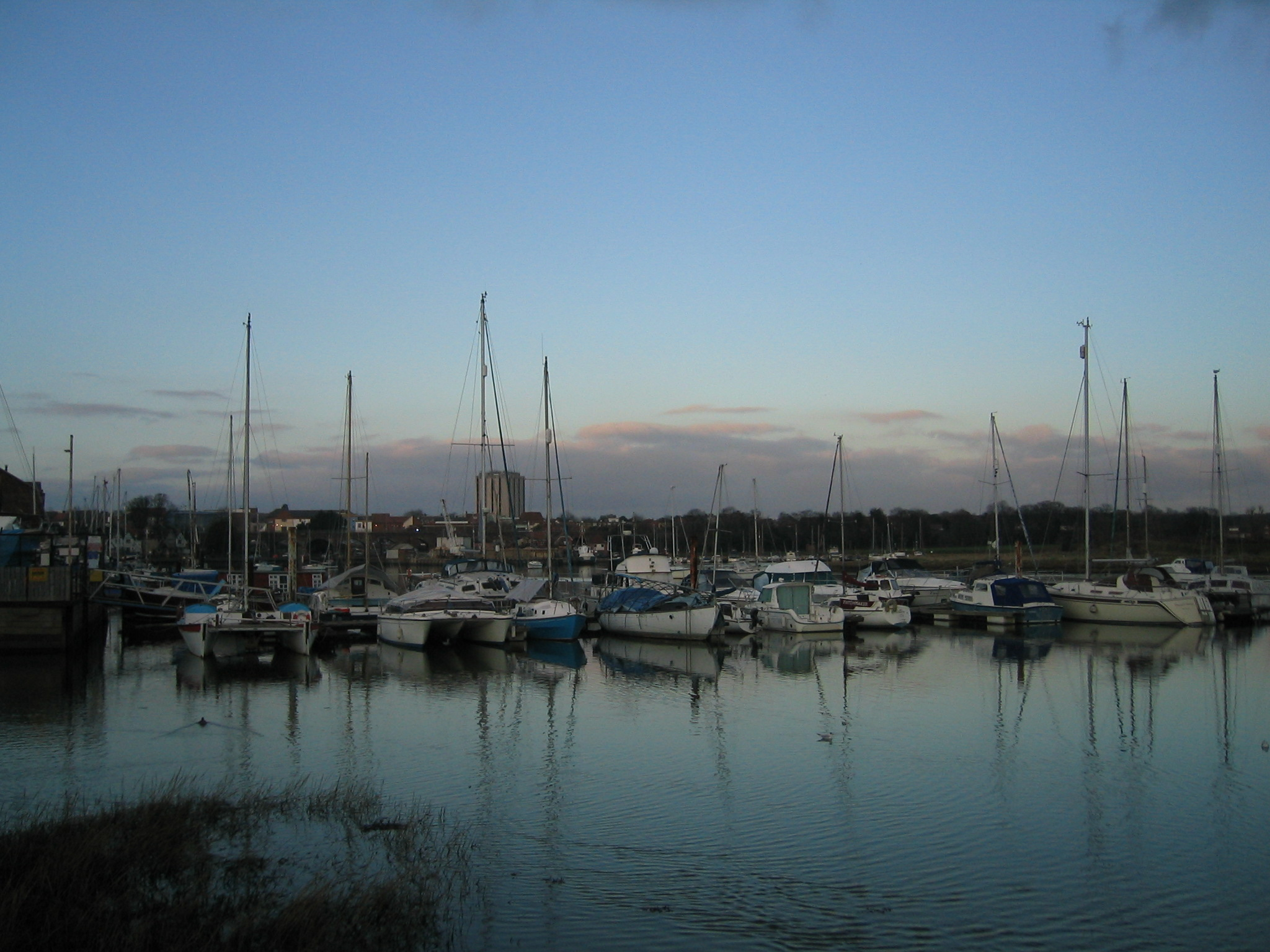
- Court: House of Lords
- Full case name: Davis Contractors Limited v Fareham Urban District Council
- Decided: 19 April 1956
- Citations: [1956] UKHL 3, [1956] AC 696

Court membership
- Judges sitting: Viscount Simonds, Lord Morton, Lord Reid, Lord Radcliffe, Lord Somervell

Case opinions
- Lord Reid

Keywords
- Frustration

Davis Contractors Ltd v Fareham Urban District Council [1956] UKHL 3 is an English contract law case concerned with the alleged frustration of an agreement.

== Facts ==
Davis Contractors agreed with Fareham UDC to build 78 houses over eight months for £92,425. It ended up taking 22 months because Davis was short of labour and materials and cost £115,223. Davis submitted that the contract was frustrated and void and therefore they were entitled to payment on a quantum meruit basis for the value of work done.

== Judgment ==
The arbitrator who first dealt with Davis Contractors' claim held that "the footing of the contract was removed" and therefore the original contract had come to an end.

On referral to the House of Lords, the Lords held that although the performance of the contract had become more onerous, it was not frustrated. Lord Reid referred to the "artificiality" involved in saying that frustration was an implied term, because people do not anticipate unforeseeable events. Instead, he wrote the following:

In my view, the proper approach to this case is to take... all facts which throw light on the nature of the contract, or which can properly be held to be extrinsic evidence relevant to assist in its construction and then, as a matter of law, to construe the contract and to determine whether the ultimate situation... is or is not within the scope of the contract so construe... appears to me that frustration depends, at least in most cases, not on adding any implied term but on the true construction of the terms which are, in the contract, read in light of the nature of the contract and of the relevant surrounding circumstances when the contract was made.

Lord Radcliffe concurred with the result:

There is, however, no uncertainty as to the materials upon which the court must proceed.... [On the "officious bystander" test] it might seem that the parties themselves have become so far disembodied spirits that their actual persons should be allowed to rest in peace. In their place there rises the figure of the fair and reasonable man. And the spokesman of the fair and reasonable man, who represents after all no more than the anthropomorphic conception of justice, is, and must be, the court itself. So, perhaps, it would be simpler to say at the outset that frustration occurs whenever the law recognises that, without the default of either party, a contractual obligation has become incapable of being performed because the circumstance in which performance is called for would render it a thing radically different from that which was undertaken by the contract. Non haec in foedera veni. It was not this that I promised to do.

Another argument which failed was that an express term was incorporated that the agreed price was binding only if there were in fact adequate supplies of labour and materials. Viscount Simonds noted that the contractors' initial proposal had included a statement to this effect but that subsequent negotiations and the resulting formal agreement did not retain this wording.

== Australian law ==
Lord Radcliffe's test was approved by the High Court of Australia in Codelfa Construction Pty Ltd v State Rail Authority of NSW.

== See also ==
- English contract law
- Frustration in English law
