= The Eugenia =

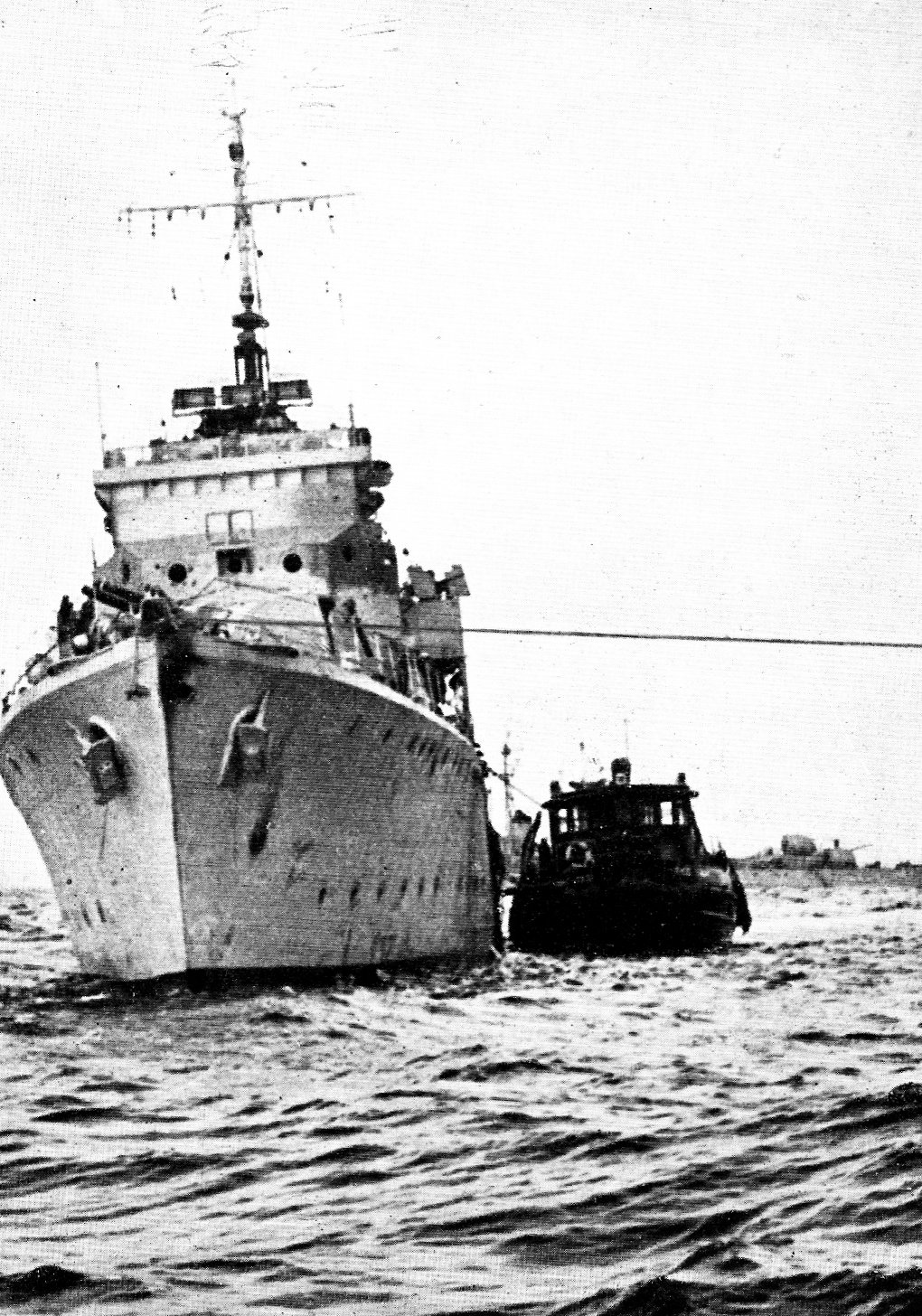
- Court: Court of Appeal
- Citation: [1964] 2 QB 226, [1964] 1 All ER 161

Case opinions
- Lord Denning MR

Keywords
- Frustration

The Eugenia (or Ocean Tramp Tankers Corp v V/O Sovfracht) [1964] 2 QB 226 is an English contract law case, concerning the frustration of an agreement.

== Facts ==
The Suez Canal became a "dangerous zone" as The Eugenia, carrying iron and steel, sailed towards it on the way to India from Odessa (but starting in Genoa). The charterers, in breach of a "general war clause" in the contract saying dangerous zones should be avoided, sailed into Port Said, thinking they could make it through the canal in time. The alternative was to sail around the Cape of Good Hope, which would have taken a long time. The ship was impounded as the canal was closed. The charterers then abandoned the contract and claimed it was frustrated. The claimant owners of the iron and steel claimed it was breach of contract.

== Judgment ==
Lord Denning MR held that there was no frustration of the contract. First, that the charterers could not rely on any self-induced frustration (sailing into the canal) as a ground for arguing the contract was frustrated. If they had not tried the Suez canal, they would have had to sail around the Cape, but this would not have rendered the contract radically different.

This means that, once again, we have had to consider the authorities on this vexed topic of frustration. But I think that the position is now reasonably clear. It is simply this: If it should happen, in the course of carrying out a contract, that a fundamentally different situation arises for which the parties made no provision – so much so that it would not be just in the new situation to hold them bound to its terms – then the contract is at an end ... the theory of an implied term has now been discarded by everyone, or nearly everyone, for the simple reason that it does not represent the truth. The parties would not have said: "It is all over between us". They would have differed about what was to happen. ... So here, the parties foresaw that the canal might become impassable. It was the very thing that they feared. But they made no provision for it. So the doctrine may still apply, if it be a proper case for it.

He said if the contract says something, "the contract must govern. There is no frustration." But if the contract says nothing, onerous or more expensive is not enough; "It must be positively unjust to hold the parties bound. It is often difficult to draw the line. But it must be done, and it is the courts to do it as a matter of law: see Tsakiroglou." He said that the material factors were that the difference in time was 108 days from Genoa via the Suez and 138 days via the Cape. The goods would not be adversely affected. The only trouble was it took longer. He firmly rejected, however, that frustration can only apply where the event is unforeseen or unexpected.

== See also ==
- English contract law
- Frustration in English law
