= Frustration in English law =

Doctrine in English contract law

Frustration is an English contract law doctrine that acts as a device to set aside contracts where an unforeseen event either renders contractual obligations impossible, or radically changes the party's principal purpose for entering into the contract. Historically, there had been no way of setting aside an impossible contract after formation; it was not until 1863, and the case of Taylor v Caldwell, that the beginnings of the doctrine of frustration were established. Whilst the doctrine has seen expansion from its inception, it is still narrow in application; Lord Roskill stated that "the doctrine is not lightly to be invoked to relieve contracting parties of the normal consequences of imprudent commercial bargains."

== Development of the doctrine ==
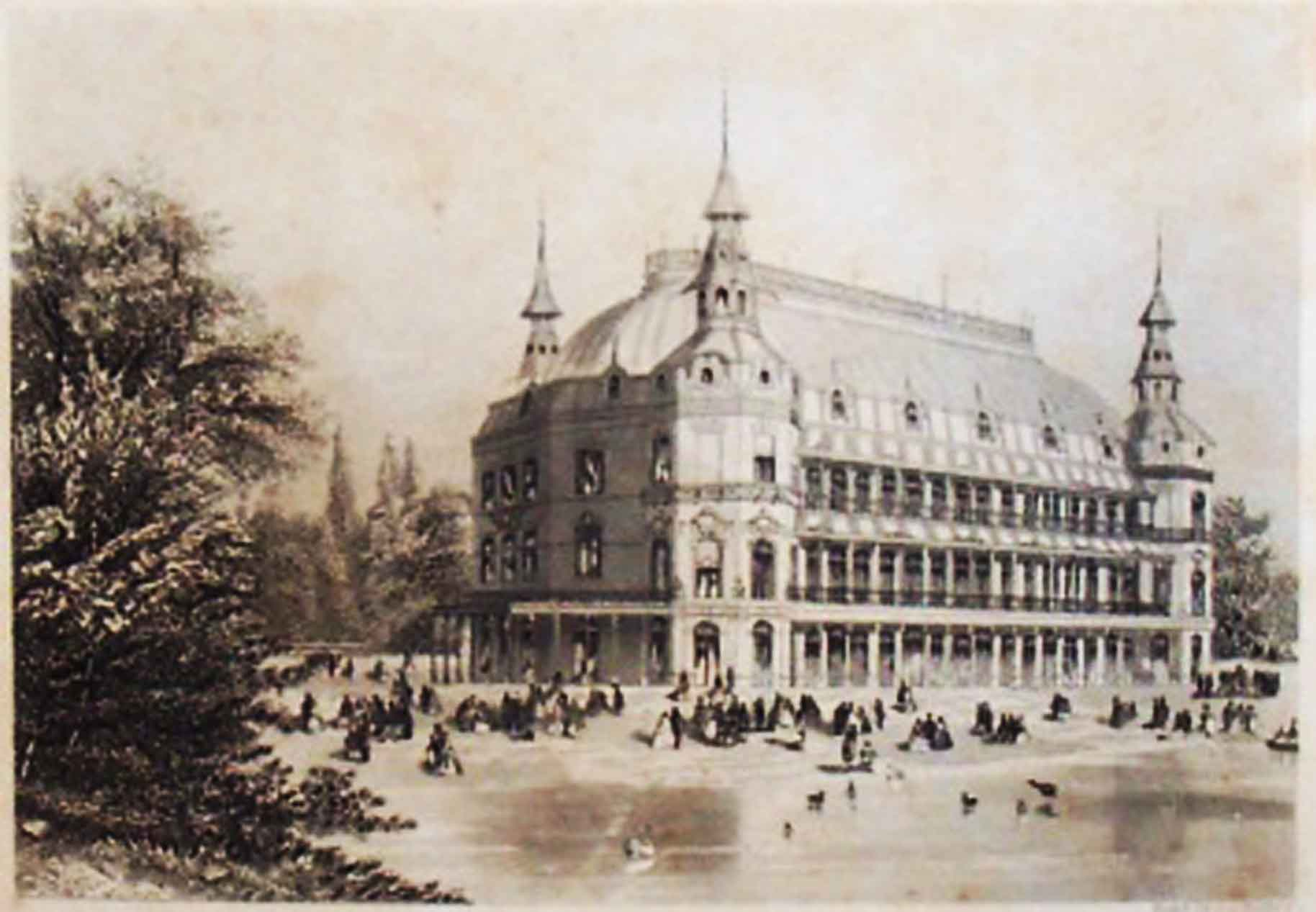
The burning down of the Surrey music hall in Taylor v Caldwell deemed a contract for its hire frustrated

Early cases such as Paradine v Jane (1647) show the historical line that the courts took toward a frustration of purpose in contract; here, the courts held that where land under lease to the defendant had been invaded by Royalist forces, he was still under obligation to pay rent to the land owner. It was not until the case of Taylor v Caldwell that a doctrine of frustration was formally recognised, alleviating the potential harshness of previous decisions. Here, two parties contracted on the hire of a music hall, for the performance of concerts. Subsequent to contracting, but prior to the dates of hire, the music hall burned down. It was held the contract was impossible to perform; Judge Blackburn stated that the absolute liability set forth in Paradine v Jane would not apply in the instant case, as there was an implied condition that the music hall would be in existence at the date of the planned concerts. This had the effect of excusing the parties from the contract. The implied term test was explained by Lord Loreburn:

In most of the cases it is said that there was an implied condition in the contract which operated to release the parties from performing it, and in all of them I think that was at bottom the principle upon which the court proceeded.

Subsequent development occurred in the case of Krell v Henry, a case arising out of the coronation of King Edward VII. The defendant here agreed by contract to rent a flat located at Pall Mall from the plaintiff, for the purpose of watching the coronation procession of Edward VII scheduled for 26 and 27 June. Despite the fact that there was no mention of the coronation ceremony in any of the parties' written correspondence, the court held the contract frustrated in purpose by the cancellation of the coronation. It could be inferred from the dealings of the parties that the principal aim of the hiring was the witnessing of the coronation. This result can be contrasted with that of Herne Bay Steamboat Co v Hutton, another coronation case. In this case, an individual hired a steamboat for the purposes of travelling to Spithead to cruise round an assembled fleet, and to witness the naval review of King Edward's coronation. The courts subsequently held that following the cancellation of the coronation, the entire purpose of the contract had not been frustrated, as the cruise was still possible.

The test used in these two cases – finding a radical change in the intentions of contracting parties – has found favour over the implied term test, which has been criticised to the extent of being called a "grave threat to the sanctity of contract". A common objection to this test was that it was 'artificial'; in many cases, such as Davis Contractors v Fareham UDC, it would not be true to say that both parties would intend for an implied term to cover particular situations. Thus an implication of a term to discharge a contract may run contrary to the intentions of the contracting parties. As a result, a test of contractual purpose is preferred, as laid out in Davis Contractors v Fareham UDC, in the judgement of Lord Reid:

The question is whether the contract which they did make is, on its true construction, wide enough to apply to the new situation: if it is not, then it is at an end.

== Frustrating events ==
=== Destruction of the subject matter ===
Where an item or building essential to the contract – which has been expressly identified – is destroyed, through no fault of either party, it can be set aside as impossible to perform, as established in Taylor v Caldwell. Such principles differ however when considering the sale of goods. The agreement of the parties is important when considering whether it has been frustrated. If it is agreed that goods from a specific source will be provided, the contract falls under Section 7 of the Sale of Goods Act 1979:

Where there is an agreement to sell specific goods and subsequently the goods, without any fault on the part of the seller or buyer, perish before the risk passes to the buyer, the agreement is avoided.

However, where a contract does not provide 'specific' goods, as required for the Act to operate, it will fall under common law rules. A contract will not be frustrated if generic goods are destroyed or rendered commercially non-viable. The risk is assumed to pass with the seller.

=== Supervening illegality ===
Where a law subsequent to contracting is passed, which renders the fundamental principle of contracting illegal, the contract will be found to be frustrated. There are several situations in which this may occur. Events such as war may render certain trading or actions illegal, as was the case in Denny, Mott & Dickinson v James Fraser and Ertel Bieber and Co v Rio Tinto Co Ltd [1918] AC 260. If the law changes prohibit performance after the contract was made, the contract may be frustrated. Changes in the law may render building work illegal, or the use of certain materials illegal. In the First World War-era case Metropolitan Water Board v Dick, Kerr & Co Ltd, a contract for the construction of a reservoir was held to be frustrated following wartime building regulations.

Such principles apply equally where contractual obligations become illegal in foreign countries, if this is where they are to occur.

=== Incapacity or death ===
A contract may become frustrated where a person or group under contract become unavailable (such as through death or illness). This generally occurs only for the performance of personal services, and not for generic commercial services such as building work, which could be performed by numerous individuals. Robinson v Davison involved a piano player who became ill prior to a concert he was contracted to play in; the contract was held to be frustrated. A similar result can be seen in Condor v The Baron Knights.

There has been more difficulty for the courts in deciding when contracts for employment may be frustrated. Notcutt v Universal Equipment Co shows that the inability of an employee to perform contractual duties – due to, in this case, a heart attack – frustrates his contract of employment. Such a principle terminates a contract for employment immediately; the employee is not entitled to the same protection under employment protection legislation, as demonstrated in Notcutt, where Mr Notcutt was not allowed to pursue sick pay under the Employment Protection (Consolidation) Act 1978.

=== Delay ===
If an event occurs which causes an excessive delay in the performance of the contract, frustration may be held. However, it must be a serious delay which affects the intended purpose of the contract. Whether the delay is sufficient to frustrate the contract depends on the time when the event that gave rise to the delay occurred; see Bank Line Ltd v Arthur Capel and Co [1919] AC 435.

== Limits of the doctrine ==
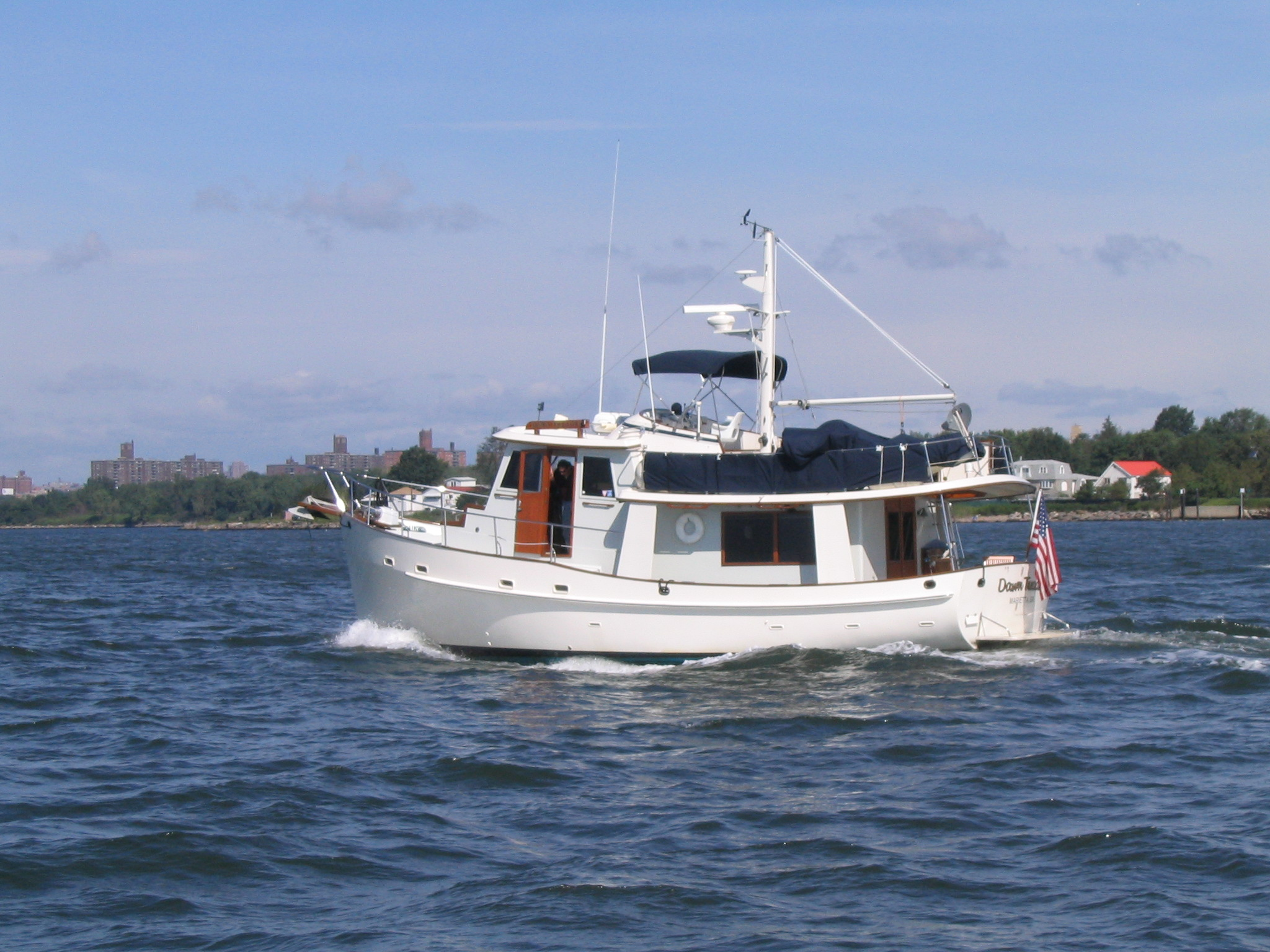
The case of Maritime National Fish Ltd v Ocean Trawlers Ltd demonstrates that a frustrating event cannot be in any way self-induced

The courts have imposed several limits on where contracts will be frustrated, so as – in the interests of certainty – not to release parties from their contractual obligations too easily. An important limitation is that economic hardship, or a 'bad bargain', will not render a contract frustrated. Thus, in Davis Contractors v Fareham UDC, the courts declined to render a contract for building work frustrated purely because the price of labour and materials had increased. Lord Reid explained the distinction between a contract becoming more onerous, and being of a different kind:

In a contract of this kind the contractor undertakes to do the work for a definite sum and he takes the risk of the cost being greater or less than he expected. If delays occur through no one's fault that may be in the contemplation of the contract, and there may be provision for extra time being given: to that extent the other party takes the risk of delay. But he does not take the risk of the cost being increased by such delay. It may be that delay could be of a character so different from anything contemplated that the contract was at an end, but in this case, in my opinion, the most that could be said is that the delay was greater in degree than was to be expected. It was not caused by any new and unforeseeable factor or event: the job proved to be more onerous but it never became a job of a different kind from that contemplated in the contract.

Of importance in deciding whether a contract is frustrated is that the event cannot have been in any way induced by either of the parties. For example, a claim of frustration was denied in Ocean Tramp Tankers Corporation v V/O Sovfracht, where a charterer for a ship allowed it to travel through the Suez Canal, and subsequently become stuck (following the closure of the canal during wartime). Additionally, where a frustrating event is foreseeably induced, a claim of frustration may be denied. Maritime National Fish Ltd v Ocean Trawlers Ltd exemplifies this principle. Maritime National Fish contracted to hire a steam trawler fitted with an otter trawl, from Ocean Trawlers Ltd. Both parties knew that the use of such a vessel without a licence was illegal. Subsequently, Maritime National Fish applied for five licences from the Canadian government, but only three were granted. Maritime National Fish did not name the hired vessel from Ocean Trawlers as one of the licensed vessels, and refused to go through with the hire, on the grounds the contract was frustrated. Their appeal was rejected on the grounds that they themselves had taken on the risk that some licences may be denied, and by thereby not allocating a licence to their chartered steam trawler, the frustration was self-induced.

== Apportionment of losses ==
A contract rendered frustrated ends obligations following the frustrating event. Under previous common law rules, this had the effect of producing potentially inequitable results, for example if a pre-payment was paid by one party to the other, it could not be recovered. Such a rule was generally agreed to be contrary to the principles of equity. Chandler v Webster [1904] 1 KB 493 demonstrates a classical establishment of this, where recovery of a pre-payment for the hiring of a flat under contract (which was subsequently deemed impossible) was unrecoverable. The influence of Scots law, and behind it, of the civil (Roman) law can be seen in the later House of Lords judgements in Cantiere San Rocco v Clyde Shipbuilding and Engineering Co. (1924) AC 226 pointing out that English law was an outlier in developed legal systems in denying recovery in a situation like Chandler. The position was not reconsidered in English law until Fibrosa Spolka Akcyjna v Fairbairn Lawson Combe Barbour Ltd [1942] AC 32, where the House of Lords ruled that payments made in return for no consideration should be recoverable:

It is clear that any civilized system of law is bound to provide remedies for cases of what has been called unjust enrichment or unjust benefit, that is to prevent a man from retaining the money of or some benefit derived from another which it is against conscience that he should keep.

This judgment was not, however, a complete solution to the problem. A remaining problem could be found in Whincup v Hughes (1870–71) LR 6 CP 78, where a watch maker died after performing one year of his contractual obligations. None of the £25 paid could be recovered, despite just a small portion of the contractual obligations being fulfilled.

== Law Reform (Frustrated Contracts) Act 1943 ==
The issue of financial obligation and recovery of pre-payments was effectively put to rest with the enactment of the Law Reform (Frustrated Contracts) Act 1943, a result of the Law Reform Commission's Seventh Interim Report. Under the act, payments can be recovered in full or in part, in a manner which the courts deem equitable. Additionally, as demonstrated in BP Exploration Co (Libya) Ltd v Hunt (No. 2), where a party has had a considerable benefit conferred upon them prior to the frustrating event, the courts can apportion some or all of this benefit to the other party, again where it is deemed equitable.

== See also ==
- Paradine v Jane
- Taylor v Caldwell
- Krell v Henry
- Cooper v Phibbs
- Law Reform (Frustrated Contracts) Act 1943
- English contract law
