= Codelfa Construction Pty Ltd v State Rail Authority of NSW =

Judgement of the High Court of Australia

- Court: High Court of Australia
- Decided: 11 May 1982
- Citations: [1982] HCA 24, (1982) 149 CLR 337

Case history
- Appealed from: New South Wales Court of Appeal
- Subsequent actions: [1982] HCA 51, (1982) 150 CLR 29

Case opinions
- (5:0) There was no implied term dealing with restraint by injunction (4:1) The contract was frustrated because of the injunction (Brennan J dissenting)
- Majority: Mason, Stephen, Aickin & Wilson JJ
- Concur/dissent: Brennan J

Codelfa Construction Pty Ltd v State Rail Authority of New South Wales, ("Codelfa") is a widely cited Australian contract law case, which serves as authority for the modern approach to contractual construction. The case greatly influenced the development of the Eastern Suburbs railway line. In terms of contract law, the case addresses questions of frustration, construction and the parol evidence rule. The case diverged from the well established English approach regarding the use of extrinsic evidence in contractual interpretation.

== Background ==
The State Rail Authority engaged Codelfa Construction under a contract for services to excavate tunnels in the Eastern Suburbs allowing for the development of the Eastern Suburbs railway line. The works were to include "the excavation of two single track tunnels commencing at Edgecliff and running through Woollahra to Bondi Junction, an open cut excavation at the site of the Woollahra station, and an underground excavation at the site of the Bondi Junction station." The State Rail Authority issued Codelfa Construction with a notice to proceed on 7 March 1972. From this date, Codelfa was bound to complete all works within 130 weeks. On the basis of legal advice the contracting parties were led to believe that the work would be exempt from injunction as it was authorised by s 11 of the City and Suburban Electric Railways (Amendment) Act 1967 (NSW), supposedly providing crown immunity. In 1972 Codelfa Construction commenced the work in three shifts each day for seven days a week. However, the noise generated by their underground drilling led several local residents and Council to apply for an injunction. On 28 June 1972, the Supreme Court of New South Wales granted an injunction, significantly restricting the work that could be performed after 10 pm and on Sunday. Codelfa Construction incurred additional costs to complete the required work within the agreed-upon timeframe.

=== Procedural history ===
Pursuant to an arbitration clause, within the contract, the parties started arbitration proceedings in 1976 to establish whether Codelfa Construction could recover the additional costs by reason of an implied term or alternatively if the contract was frustrated to recover the reasonable value of the services provided (quantum meruit). As the arbitration proceedings had no jurisdiction with regard to frustration of the contract, they dealt principally with the issue of an implied term in the contract. The arbitrator found that a term could be implied into the contract to the effect that the deadline could be extended if workable hours varied. Both parties issued summons in the Supreme Court of NSW to reach a determination on a number of questions raised in the proceedings. Codelfa Construction alleged that the contract had been frustrated and further alleged that an implied provision of the contract, to pay a reasonable sum for work performed, had not been met. The State Rail Authority's allegations were to the effect that Codelfa Construction was bound to complete the works. Following the arbitrator's decision, a case was commenced in the Supreme Court of New South Wales. In his judgment Justice Ash found that the contract had not been frustrated, instead he extended the implied term found by the arbitrator to also account for the understanding that work's could not continue where an injunction was granted. On appeal, Justices Reynolds, Glass and Samuels of the Court of Appeal varied Justice Ash's implied term but reached the same conclusion that an implied term could be found in the contract but that the contract was not frustrated.

Codelfa Construction then appealed to the High Court challenging the finding regarding the action in frustration. The State Rail Authority cross-appealed on a number of grounds centrally challenging the court's assertion that a term could be implied into the contract.

== The High Court decision ==
=== Construction ===
According to the parol evidence rule, it can be said that where a contract is wholly in writing "verbal evidence is not allowed to be given of what passed between the parties, either before the written document was made, or during the time that it was in a state of preparation, so as to add to or subtract from, or in any manner to vary or qualify the written contract." In order to ascertain whether the contract is wholly or partly in writing the court will consider the oral statements which parties claim forms part of the final contract. On this point the law is uniform in Australia and the United Kingdom.

The rationale behind contractual construction, as explained by J.W. Carter, is not to infer the subjective intentions of the parties or give meaning to a term of a contract consistent with those subjective understandings. Instead, the goal is to give meaning to the contract that is consistent with what a reasonable person in the position of the contracting party would have understood the term to mean.

In implementing this principle, British and Australian courts have diverged in their allowance of extrinsic evidence which is said to form part of the "surrounding circumstances" of a contract when determining the meaning and effect of contractual terms. In English law courts may consider the "matrix of fact" surrounding the formation of the contract. The "matrix of fact" extends to the words and conduct of the contractual parties, common industry knowledge and any other factor which may have affected the reasonable person's understanding of the language of the contract. The Court will interpret the meaning of the contract in light of these circumstances.

In Australian law however the High Court deviated from the English rule of contractual construction and instead held that Australian courts should follow the 'true rule' of contractual construction.

==== The 'true rule' ====
Justice Mason held that:

The true rule is that evidence of surrounding circumstances is admissible to assist in the interpretation of the contract if the language is ambiguous or susceptible of more than one meaning. But it is not admissible to contradict the language of the contract when it has a plain meaning.

Under this rule extrinsic evidence of the surrounding circumstances and commercial objectives of a contract may only be referred to where the Court has established that a term of a contract is ambiguous. However, Justice Mason did not define the kind of ambiguity required to meet the requirements of the 'true rule'.

=== Implied term ===
The court considered whether a term could be implied into the contract allowing for a reasonable extension of time to complete the works given the delays caused by the injunction. The High Court rejected that a term could be implied, holding that it was impossible to formulate a term with appropriate clarity and precision. Further, even if it could be established that such a term would be necessary to give business efficacy it could not be held "so obvious that it went without saying" that the contracting parties intended for such a term to form part of their contractual relationship.

=== Frustration ===
However, the Codelfa Construction succeeded on the second ground of appeal, with the majority finding that the contract was frustrated. In coming to this determination, the court followed the definition of frustration laid out in Davis Contractors Ltd v Fareham Urban District Council. That is that "frustration occurs whenever the law recognises that without default of either party a contractual obligation has become incapable of being performed because the circumstances in which performance called for would render it a thing radically different from that which was undertaken by the contract". Therefore, the critical issue which the court had to determine was whether the situation resulting from the grant of an injunction rendered the situation "radically different" from that which was contemplated at the time of contractual formation. On this point, Justice Aickin said:

“It is a different situation from that in which one party has been prevented from completing the contract work within a specific time because of a shortage of materials or labour…the injunction made it impossible to complete the work being done in a manner of time, which, from the outset, both parties knew were essential…’

== Consequences ==
A number of decisions made by the High Court following Codelfa contradicted the 'true rule' including Maggbury Pty Ltd v Hafele Australia Pty Ltd, Pacific Carriers Ltd v BNP Paribas, and Toll (FGCT) Pty Ltd v Alphapharm Pty Ltd. Following this apparent shift in judicial opinion, numerous intermediate appellate courts and lower courts followed the principles established by Investors Compensation Scheme Ltd v West Bromwich Building Society. The 'true rule' was understood by many courts to have lapsed in favour of the English approach to contractual construction.

However, in other High Court cases the 'true rule' was affirmed as the correct approach to contractual construction. In Royal Botanic Gardens and Domain Trust v South Sydney City Council, the court indicated that the decision remained good law in Australia. In that case, the High Court noted that ambiguity must first be established before referring to extrinsic evidence. The court held that the use of the term "may" introduced ambiguity into the contract, and could refer to an exhaustive or inexhaustive number of considerations. This has attracted criticism from many academics, who have found that the term "may" was not open to ambiguity. Further, they argue that this demonstrates the difficulty of applying the "true rule" and determining which contextual factors are truly extrinsic to the language of the contract.

Furthermore, an application for special leave for a case to be heard in the High Court in Western Export Services Inc v Jireh International Pty Ltd, the bench stated that Codelfa remained good law in Australia. Justices Gummow, Bell and Heydon noted that primary judges and intermediate appellate courts are ‘bound to follow that precedent' until the High Court holds otherwise.

As an application for special leave is a procedural motion rather than a substantive hearing the statements of the bench did not establish a binding precedent. However, this application for special leave is notable for being published in the Australian Law Reports and representing the unambiguous judicial opinion of three justices of the High Court. Yet in Mount Bruce Mining Pty Ltd v Wright Prospecting Pty Ltd, Chief Justice French, as well as Justices Nettle and Gordon made clear that lower courts had been incorrect in identifying Western Export Services Inc v Jireh International Pty Ltd, as an authoritative statement on the correct approach to contractual construction, as a procedural motion in itself is not binding in Australian law.

Decisions such as Electricity Generation Corporation v Woodside Energy Ltd, and Mount Bruce Mining Pty Ltd v Wright Prospecting Pty Ltd, have involved the High Court applying the approach set out in Investors Compensation Scheme Ltd v West Bromwich Building Society, despite affirming the 'true rule' in Western Export Services Inc v Jireh International Pty Ltd. This suggests that Codelfa may no longer be good law in Australia. The New South Wales Supreme Court has taken the view that Codelfa no longer represents the view of the court and as such has moved towards accepting the English approach laid out in Investors Compensation Scheme Ltd v West Bromwich Building Society.

As the authority of the Codelfa decision remains an unsettled point in Australian law many issues have arisen in contractual construction at lower level courts. One common practice used to circumvent this issue has been the use of recitals at the start of the contract, per Adventure Golf Systems Australia Pty Ltd v Belgravia Health & Leisure Group Pty Ltd. This allows the contract to be read in light of circumstances that both parties agreed at the time of formation were relevant to the interpretation of terms. Legal scholars have noted that this is a significant area of law, in which a binding decision in favour of Investors Compensation Scheme Ltd v West Bromwich Building Society, or in favour of Justice Mason's 'true rule' would have significant implications for contractual disputes.

=== Lower courts ===
At present contractual construction in Australian law is not consistent and uniform between different states and territories, with lower courts and intermediate appellate courts adopting different positions in relation to Codelfa. The Supreme Court of NSW in Mainteck Services Pty Ltd v Stein Heurtey SA, supported the conclusion that Investors Compensation Scheme Ltd v West Bromwich Building Society, had been accepted in Australian law, therefore, ambiguity did not have to be pointed to before referring to 'surrounding circumstances'. This position was supported by the Full Court of the Federal Court of Australia in Stratton Finance Pty Ltd v Webb. However, the Western Australian Supreme Court has stated that Codelfa remains good law in Australia in Technomin Australia Pty Ltd v Xstrata Nickel Australia Operations.
