= Paradine v Jane =

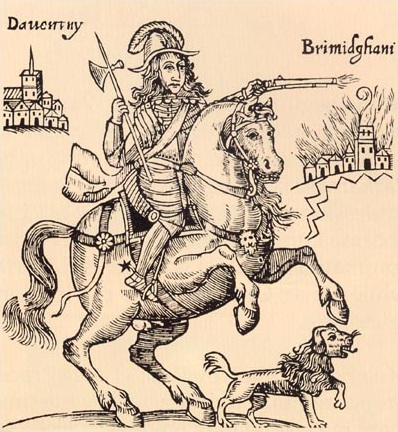
- Court: King’s Bench
- Decided: 26 March 1647
- Citations: [1647] EWHC KB J5, (1647) Aleyn 26, 82 ER 897, Mich. 23 Car. Banco Regis., Hil. 22 Car. Rot. 1178, & 1179

Keywords
- Frustration

Paradine v Jane [1647] EWHC KB J5 is an English contract law case which established absolute liability for contractual debts.

== Facts ==
This action grew out of the English Civil War. Prince Rupert was commander of the armies of his uncle, King Charles I. Forces on both sides often looted the estates of the nobles for the purpose of gaining supplies. On July 19, 1643, the English Royalist forces, known as the Cavaliers, took possession of land owned by the plaintiff, Paradine, which was under lease to the defendant, Jane. The Royalists held the land for three years, finally relinquishing it in 1646 after the remaining Royalist resistance collapsed.

Paradine brought suit against Jane to recover for breach of the lease:

In debt the plaintiff declares upon a lease for years rendering rent at the four usual feasts; and for rent behind for three years, ending at the Feast of the Annunciation, 21 Car. [1646] brings his action; the defendant pleads, that a certain German prince, by name Prince Rupert, an alien born, enemy to the King and his kingdom, had invaded the realm with an hostile army of men; and with the same force did enter upon the defendant’s possession, and him expelled, and held out of possession from the 19 of July 18 Car. [1642] till the Feast of the Annunciation, 21 Car. whereby he could not take the profits; whereupon the plaintiff demurred, and the plea was resolved insufficient.

== Judgment ==
The justices of the King's Bench Division stated that even though in previous cases they would not allow a lessor to proceed against a lessee in time of war, Jane was still liable for the rent.

It was resolved, that the matter of the plea was insufficient; for though the whole army had been alien enemies, yet he ought to pay his rent. And this difference was taken, that where the law creates a duty or charge, and the party is disabled to perform it without any default in him, and hath no remedy over, there the law will excuse him. As in the case of waste, if a house be destroyed by tempest, or by enemies, the lessee is excused. Dyer, 33. a. Inst. 53. d. 283. a. 12 H. 4. 6. so of an escape. Co. 4. 84. b. 33 H. 6. 1. So in 9 E. 3. 16. a supersedeas was awarded to the justices, that they should not proceed in a cessavit upon a cesser during the war, but when the party by his own contract creates a duty or charge upon himself, he is bound to make it good, if he may, notwithstanding any accident by inevitable necessity, because he might have provided against it by his contract. And therefore if the lessee covenant to repair a house, though it be burnt by lightning, or thrown down by enemies, yet he ought to repair it. Dyer 33. a. 40 E. 3. 6. h. Now the rent is a duty created by the parties upon the reservation, and had there been a covenant to pay it, there had been no question but the lessee must have made it good, notwithstanding the interruption by enemies, for the law would not protect him beyond his own agreement, no more than in the case of reparations; this reservation then being a covenant in law, and whereupon an action of covenant hath been maintained (as Roll said) it is all one as if there had been an actual covenant. Another reason was added, that as the lessee is to have the advantage of casual profits, so he must run the hazard of casual losses, and not lay the whole burthen of them upon his lessor; and Dyer 56. 6. was cited for this purpose, that though the land be surrounded, or gained by the sea, or made barren by wildfire, yet the lessor shall have his whole rent: and judgment was given for the plaintiff.

== Criticism ==
In his book The Death of Contract, American law professor Grant Gilmore suggests that both English and American judges broadened the principle set forth in Paradine v. Jane unnecessarily. He argues that no legal system consistently held parties absolutely liable for the contracts they made, and that the holding of Paradine itself is limited to its own circumstances, meaning that either the defendant could not counterclaim his own plea against the landlord’s action for rent, or that the court considered the leasehold to be a fully executed transaction.
