= Denny, Mott & Dickson Ltd v James B Fraser & Co Ltd =

English contract law case

- Court: House of Lords
- Citation: [1944] AC 265
- Transcript: judgment

Case opinions
- Lord Wright

Keywords
- Frustration

Denny, Mott & Dickson Ltd v James B Fraser & Co Ltd [1944] AC 265 is an English contract law case concerned with the frustration of an agreement.

== Facts ==
James B Fraser & Co Ltd were timber merchants. An agreement with Denny, Mott & Dickson Ltd in 1929 said that they would buy wood from Denny, and lease a timber yard with the option to buy it or take a long lease on certain terms. The contract's first four clauses concerned the timber. Clause 5 provided for the contract's termination on notice by either party. Clause 6 provided for the letting of the timber yard "to enable the foresaid trading agreement to be carried out". Clause 8 gave Denny, "in the event of the foregoing trading agreement being terminated by either party as aforesaid, ... the right as at the date of the termination of the said agreement" to purchase the timber yard at a certain price or to take a lease of it at a certain rent. Because of the Control of Timber (No. 4) Order 1939, further transactions between the parties became impossible from the end of September 1939. Denny continued to occupy the timber yard. In July 1941 James sent a letter purporting to give notice to terminate the agreement and also of their intention to exercise the option to purchase the yard.

== Judgment ==
The House of Lords held that the contract had become frustrated, and so the option could not be exercised because it only arose after notice in accordance with clause 5. Lord Wright said the following:

The data for decision are, on the one hand, the terms and construction of the contract, read in the light of the then existing circumstances, and on the other hand the events which have occurred. ... The parties did not anticipate fully and completely, if at all, or provide for what actually happened. It is not possible to my mind to say that, if they had thought of it, they would have said, 'Well if that happens, all is over between us'. On the contrary they would almost certainly on the one side or the other have sought to introduce reservations or qualifications or compensations ...

== See also ==
- English contract law
- Frustration in English law
