= Security agreement =

A security agreement, in the law of the United States, is a contract that governs the relationship between the parties to a kind of financial transaction known as a secured transaction. In a secured transaction, the Grantor (typically a borrower but possibly a guarantor or surety) assigns, grants and pledges to the grantee (typically the lender) a security interest in personal property which is referred to as the collateral. Examples of typical collateral are shares of stock, livestock, and vehicles. A security agreement is not used to transfer any interest in real property (land/real estate), only personal property. The document used by lenders to obtain a lien on real property is a mortgage or deed of trust.

The security agreement sets out the various rights the grantee will have with respect to the collateral, which are in addition to all other rights which the lender may have by law, such as those rights contained in Article 9 of the Uniform Commercial Code which has been adopted in some form by each state in the United States. The Security Agreement also addresses issues such as permitted sales or other transactions with the collateral in the ordinary course of the grantor's business and notices that may be required to be given by the grantee to the grantor if certain actions are taken. There are many forms available for purchase from legal supply and banker supply companies, in addition to software that will produce a security agreement according to specific user input.

A security agreement may be oral if the secured party (the lender) has actual physical possession of the collateral. Where the collateral remains in the physical possession of the borrower, or where the collateral is intangible (such as a patent., accounts receivable, or a promissory note), the security agreement must be in writing in order to satisfy the statute of frauds. The security agreement must be authenticated by the debtor, meaning that it must either bear the debtor's signature, or it must be electronically marked. It must contain a reasonable description of the collateral, and must use words showing an intent to create a security interest (the right to seek repayment of the loan by foreclosing on the collateral). In order for the security agreement to be valid, the borrower must usually have rights in the collateral at the time the agreement is executed. If a borrower pledges as collateral a car owned by a neighbor, and the neighbor does not know of and endorse this pledge, then the security agreement is ineffective. However, a security agreement may specify that it includes after-acquired property. If such a specification is included, then a pledge of "all automobiles owned by borrower" would include the neighbor's car if the borrower were to buy that car from the neighbor.

In order for a security interest to attach to the collateral in the possession of subsequent purchasers, it must be perfected. If the security agreement is for a purchase money security interest in consumer goods, perfection is automatic. Otherwise, the lender must record either the agreement itself, or a UCC-1 financing statement, in an appropriate public venue (usually the state secretary of state or a state business commission under that person's authority). Perfecting the interest creates constructive notice, which is deemed legally sufficient to inform the rest of the world of the lender's rights in the collateral. Where a borrower has used the same property as collateral with respect to multiple security agreements made with different lenders, the first lender to record the interest has the strongest claim to that property.

== See also ==
- Secured transactions in the United States
