= Hughes v Metropolitan Railway Co =

1877 UK House of Lords case

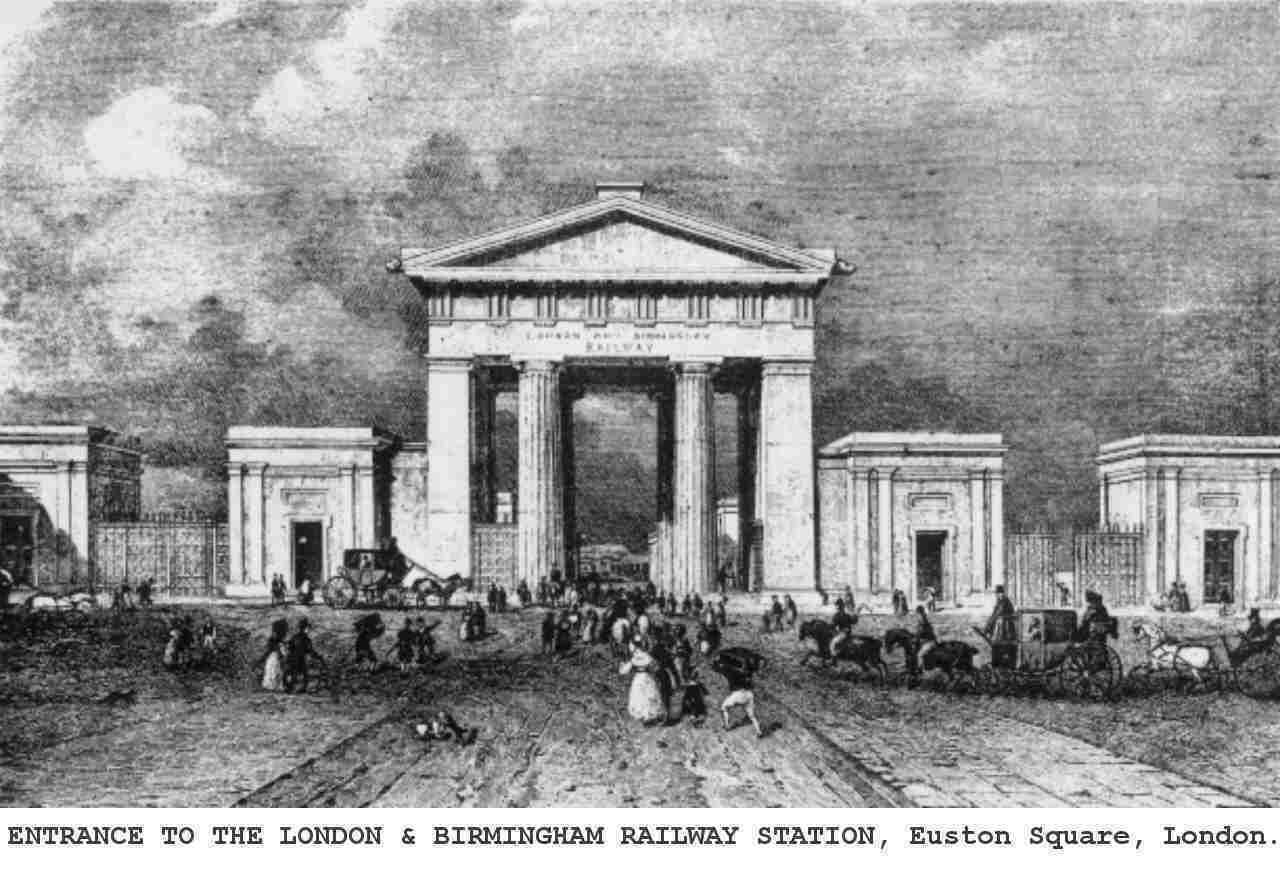
- Court: House of Lords
- Full case name: THOMAS HUGHES APPELLANT v THE DIRECTORS, & C., OF THE METROPOLITAN RAILWAY COMPANY RESPONDENTS
- Decided: 5 June 1877
- Citations: [1877] UKHL 1, [1877] 2 AC 439

Court membership
- Judges sitting: Lord Cairns LC, Lord O'Hagan, LORD SELBORNE, LORD BLACKBURN, LORD GORDON

Case opinions
- Lord Cairns LC

Hughes v Metropolitan Railway Co [1877] is a House of Lords case considered unremarkable for many years until it was resurrected in 1947 by Denning J in the case of Central London Property Trust Ltd v High Trees House Ltd in his development of the doctrine of promissory estoppel. The case was the first known instance of the concept of promissory estoppel.

== Facts ==
Thomas Hughes owned property leased to the Railway Company at 216 Euston Road. Under the lease, Hughes was entitled to compel the tenant to repair the building within six months of notice. Notice was given on 22 October 1874 from which the tenants had until 22 April to finish the repairs. On 28 November, the tenant railway company sent a letter proposing that Hughes purchase the tenant's leasehold interest. Negotiations began but later broke down, at which point the landlord demanded the repair of the building from 6 months since the original notice. The tenant claimed he should have had 6 months from the time the negotiations broke down, based on promissory estoppel.

== Judgment ==
=== Court of Common Pleas ===
The Court of Common Pleas held in favour of the landlord, Mr Hughes. Metropolitan appealed. Lord Coleridge CJ delivered the leading judgment, with which Brett J and Lindley J concurred.

=== Court of Appeal ===
The Court of Appeal (1875–76) LR 1 CPD 120 reversed the decision of Court of Common Pleas. James LJ, Mellish LJ, Baggallay JA, Mellor J, and Cleasby B gave judgments.

=== House of Lords ===
The House of Lords affirmed the Court of Appeal. It ruled that with the initiation of the negotiations there was an implied promise by the landlord not to enforce their strict legal rights with respect to the time limit on the repairs, and the tenant acted on this promise to their detriment. Lord Cairns LC gave the lead judgment, with which Lords O'Hagan, Selborne, Blackburn and Gordon concurred.

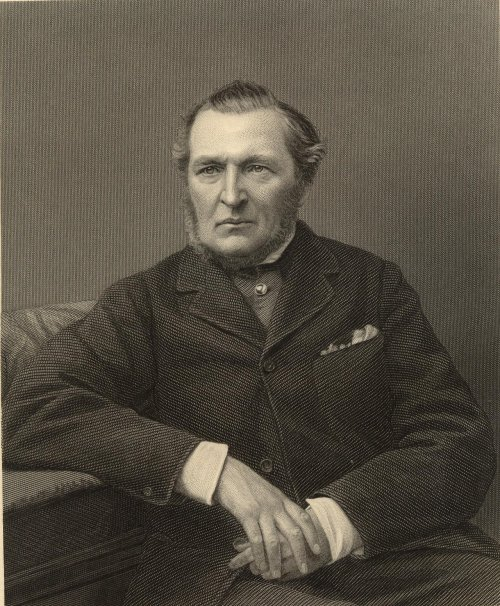
Hugh Cairns, 1st Earl Cairns gave the leading judgment.

My Lords, it is upon those grounds that I am of opinion that the decision of the Court below is correct. It was not argued at your Lordships' Bar, and it could not be argued, that there was any right of a Court of Equity, or any practice of a Court of Equity, to give relief in cases of this kind, by way of mercy, or by way merely of saving property from forfeiture, but it is the first principle upon which all Courts of Equity proceed, that if parties who have entered into definite and distinct terms involving certain legal results—certain penalties or legal forfeiture—afterwards by their own act or with their own consent enter upon a course of negotiation which has the effect of leading one of the parties to suppose that the strict rights arising under the contract will not be enforced, or will be kept in suspense, or held in abeyance, the person who otherwise might have enforced those rights will not be allowed to enforce them where it would be inequitable having regard to the dealings which have thus taken place between the parties. My Lords, I repeat that I attribute to the Appellant no intention here to take advantage of, to lay a trap for, or to lull into false security those with whom he was dealing; but it appears to me that both parties by entering upon the negotiation which they entered upon, made it an inequitable thing that the exact period of six months dating from the month of October should afterwards be measured out as against the Respondents as the period during which the repairs must be executed.

In this instance the rights of the landlord were suspended only temporarily, allowing the tenant more time to repair.

== See also ==
- Consideration in English law
