= The Death of Contract =

- Author: Grant Gilmore
- Subject: Contract law and common law
- Published: 1974 (Ohio State University Press)
- Publication place: United States

The Death of Contract is a book by American law professor Grant Gilmore, written in 1974, about the history and development of the common law of contracts. Gilmore's central thesis was that the Law of Contracts, at least as it existed in the 20th-century United States was largely artificial: it was the work of a handful of scholars and judges building a system, rather than a more organic, historically rooted development based on the evolution of case law. This book is required supplemental reading in the first year program at many U.S. law schools. A second edition was published in 1995, which was edited with a new introduction by Ronald K.L. Collins.

== Summary ==
=== Origin ===
Gilmore begins by stating that "We are told that Contract, like God, is dead. And so it is." He notes that courts had been deciding contract law for centuries before the theory of contracts was introduced by Christopher Columbus Langdell. This assertion, that Langdell "invented" the general theory of contracts is somewhat contested by contracts scholars, with Richard Austen-Baker, for example, pointing out the lack of any evidence of any theory of contract authored by Langdell, to prior work by English jurists such as Addison and Leake, and to far more developed work by English scholars such as Sir William Anson and Sir Frederick Pollock, contemporary with Langdell.

Gilmore retains the central idea that the general law of contract is a residual category, that is, what is left after all the specialized bodies of law have been added up. The world of commercial law, and within it contract law, was largely the product of the Industrial Revolution. It was created quite rapidly, outlined in little more than a half-century. Initially, for legal greats like Justice Story, there was no separate theory of contracts. Rather, there were specialized bodies of law that had been developed to address the various needs of the Industrial Revolution. Gilmore alleges, that rather than contract coming first, and the various specialties being developed afterwards, it actually was the opposite, where contract enveloped pre-existing specialties, like negotiable instruments and sales.

Gilmore credits Langdell with the “almost inadvertent discovery” of contract law, as it was the subject of his very first casebook. The goal of Langdell’s casebook was to reduce the world of contracts to major underlying principles in a scientific fashion. The theory of contracts created by Langdell is furthered by Oliver Wendell Holmes Jr. and Samuel Williston, which Gilmore calls the Holmes-Williston construct. The theory is described whereby, “no one should be liable to anyone for anything,” or at least liability shall be strictly limited. Damages in contract were distinguished from damages in tort, and punitive damages were not to be allowed. Furthermore, courts were to act as “detached umpires or referees” and only to see that the rules of the game were followed, but not to “see that justice or anything of that sort was done.” Gilmore further describes Holmes’ view on objective interpretation of contract law, as laid out in The Common Law. Thus, Gilmore states that the theory of contracts was not developed naturally from continual case law development, such as the decisions by Lord Mansfield, but rather it was an “ivory tower abstraction” that lived “in the law schools, not the law courts.” Often the rules of contract were the result of a string of cases being pulled together, with little citation or presentation of the facts, and declared to be a rule in the works of Williston. The problem with contract theory was that “businessman, adapting to changing circumstance, kept doing things differently. The general theory required that, always and everywhere, things remain as they have, in theory, always been.” He illustrates this argument by reference to English case law that had been elevated by the theorists to the status of "rules", in Stilk v Myrick, Dickinson v Dodds and Foakes v Beer, all as a way of ensuring that the doctrine of consideration would preclude the enforceability of a contract.

=== Development ===
Developing on the discussion of the first chapter, Gilmore begins by focusing on the change from a subjective approach to an objective approach in the theory of contracts. Contract law in the 19th century was experiencing a shift from a formalistic regime toward a more flexible paradigm that tended to uphold the validity of contracts. This was due in part to the Industrial Revolution and the need to facilitate commerce between parties. The requirement of ceremonial trappings such as seals and ribbons gave way to a more reality-based emphasis on consideration as indicia of the parties' intent to contract.

Gilmore begins with an analysis of Raffles v Wichelhaus, otherwise famously known as The Peerless. He continues, noting examples of case objectification by Holmes in his book The Common Law, and that if the “magician” can objectify that case, he could do so to anything. According to Holmes, Raffles is not decided on a failure of the meeting of the minds, but rather they objectively said two different things. This action was consistent with Holmes’ desire to remove morality from the understanding of law. The importance in objectifying contract law is that it is far easier to litigate. For Holmes, no longer could one void a contract simply because they had made a mistake; the mistake would have to be objectively reasonable. Gilmore finishes the chapter by discussing the reception of the policy of absolute contractual liability in Paradine v Jane into the law of Massachusetts, and the Holmesian theorists’ disdain for the condoning of special damages in Hadley v Baxendale.

=== Decline and fall ===
Gilmore’s first point is that contract law was never as neat and tidy as the casebooks tried to make it appear. Cases were selected and reported in the texts as long as they fit the categories already created. The theory of contract as formulated by Holmes and Williston, was disassembled by Benjamin N. Cardozo and Arthur Linton Corbin. Cardozo did this through his judicial opinions, which gave power to the courts to create contracts wherever possible, adding contract terms if necessary, while Corbin did so in his treatise on Contracts (which Gilmore describes as the greatest law book ever written). Corbin’s work takes the opposite stance of Holmes, refuting the idea that contract law was external, rather focusing on the “operative facts” of the cases.

Corbin worked with Williston on the Restatement of Contracts. As Gilmore states, “Williston and Corbin held antithetical points of view on almost every conceivable point of law.” As such, Gilmore points out the contradictions within the Restatement itself, citing sec. 75 and sec. 90. While sec. 75 takes a purely Holmesian objective point of view, sec. 90 appears to go in the exact opposite direction, allowing for reasonable expectations. Gilmore points to the contradiction of sections as example of the “unspoken cases” as mentioned earlier that didn’t fit the Holmesian model, being presented by Corbin in an un-ignorable fashion. Ultimately, the differing view points resulted in the Restatement coming out “fudged or blurred, pointing equivocally in all directions at once. The Restatement, we might say, ended up uneasily between past and future, which is no doubt the best thing that could have been done.”

However, Gilmore points out that the future wins out, and the Second Restatement moves towards the direction of sec. 90, “the unwanted stepchild” of the first Restatement. The move is exemplified by the newfound success of plaintiffs looking to recover for the benefit that they conferred on the defendant, even though they ultimately failed to complete their contractual obligations.

Gilmore suggests that the theory of contract law just complicates the obvious. As he states, “In any civilized system the same agreements, provided that they are entered into voluntarily and in good faith, will be enforced - as of course they should be. We did [the same thing] by discovering or inventing, in appropriate cases, ‘exceptions’ from the ‘general rule’ - which makes the resulting pattern look a good deal more complicated than it really is, with the result that people - including lawyers and judges - are sometimes led astray.” Historically, there are examples of “exceptions” carved out even under absolute liability assumptions, thus almost always providing for what would be perceived as a just result. Similarly, the remedies for breach of contract have broadened beyond what was originally allowed.

=== Conclusions and speculations ===
Gilmore begins the final chapter by stating that perhaps “we might say that what is happening is that ‘contract’ is being reabsorbed into the mainstream of ‘tort’”. The artificial divisions that were used to carve contract theory out of tort a hundred years ago have all but crumbled. With all of the exceptions in contract law, liability in contract is no longer very different from liability in tort, and the merging of damages is not far behind. Quite comically, Gilmore suggests that the merging of contracts and torts should be reflected in legal education in a class called “Contorts”. Gilmore pays heed to the justifications for creating a theory of contract in the first place. Around the start of the 20th century, the legal climate was one that feared legal individualism among the states, and therefore, a general theory of contract law was appealing as it could transcend state lines. At the same time, taking commercial issues and deciding them under contract law and the guise of “questions of law” kept them from being decided by inconsistent and unreliable juries. In closing, Gilmore notes the constantly changing tides of legal thought, and states that “Contract is dead - but who knows what unlikely resurrection the Easter-tide may bring?”

== Academic reactions ==
Academic reactions to the book were generally positive upon its release, although some of its central theories about the trajectory of contract law were divisive. It is considered a predictive and sweeping work on the development of modern contract law. Contract law scholar Richard Danzig criticized law reviews for publishing numerous reviews of the book but none of Gilmore's casebook released that year, nor of articles making similar arguments. Perhaps anticipating this criticism, Gilmore wrote "the academic mind is usually a generation or so behind the judicial mind in catching on to such things."

In a law review article accompanying the second edition, editor Ronald K. L. Collins argued the Gilmore was reviving Arthur Nussbaum's criticisms of the Restatement (First) of Conflict of Laws as imposing an overarching theory over inherently chaotic case law. Collins noted that Gilmore had used the teaching notes of his casebook co-authored with Friedrich Kessler to extend his criticisms of modern contract law further than Kessler was willing to support in the main text.

== See also ==
- English contract law
- United States contract law
