= Igbo v Johnson, Matthey Chemicals Ltd =

- Court: Court of Appeal of England and Wales
- Citation: [1986] ICR 505

Keywords
- Unfair dismissal

Igbo v Johnson, Matthey Chemicals Ltd [1986] ICR 505 is a UK labour law case, concerning unfair dismissal, now governed by the Employment Rights Act 1996.

== Facts ==
Ms Igbo was granted three extra days holiday for signing an agreement that if she failed to return on a set date ‘your contract of employment will automatically terminate’. She was ill, and sent in a medical note, but her job was still terminated.

== Judgment ==
Parker LJ held that agreed terminations are very often still dismissals, as under the Employment Rights Act 1996 section 95(1)(b) where fixed term contracts expire, or where there is notice under section 95(1)(a). Here the provision for automatic termination had the effect, if valid, of limiting the operation of the sections. It was therefore void by virtue of section 203.

== See also ==
- UK labour law
