= Taylor v Caldwell =

Landmark English contract law case

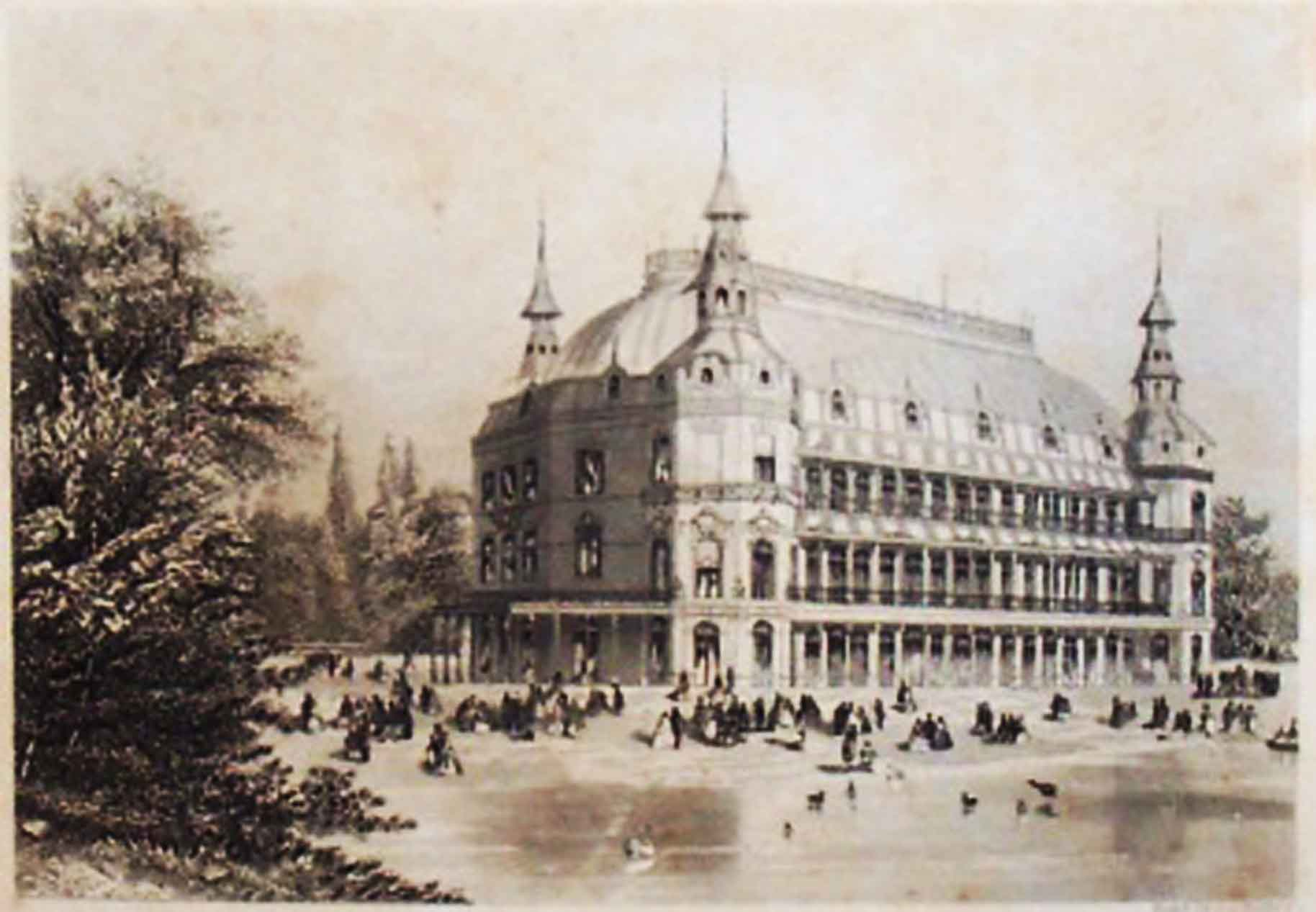
- Court: Court of Queen's Bench
- Decided: 6 May 1863
- Citations: [1863] EWHC QB J1, (1863) 3 B & S 826, 122 ER 309
- Transcript: EWHC QB J1

Case opinions
- Blackburn J

Taylor v Caldwell is a landmark English contract law case, with an opinion delivered by Mr Justice Blackburn which established the doctrine of common law impossibility.

== Facts ==
Caldwell & Bishop owned Surrey Gardens & Music Hall, and agreed to rent it out to Taylor & Lewis for £100 a day. Taylor had planned to use the music hall for four concerts and day and evening fetes on Monday 17 June, Monday 15 July, Monday 5 August, and Monday 19 August 1861. They were going to provide a variety of extravagant entertainments including a singing performance by Sims Reeves, a thirty-five to forty-piece military and quadrille band, al fresco entertainments, minstrels, fireworks and full illuminations, a ballet or divertissement, a wizard and Grecian statues, tight rope performances, rifle galleries, air gun shooting, Chinese and Parisian games, boats on the lake, and aquatic sports.

According to the contract the parties had signed, the defendants were to provide most of the British performers. Taylor & Lewis agreed to pay one hundred pounds sterling in the evening of the day of each concert by a crossed cheque, and also to find and provide, at their own cost, all the necessary artistes for the concerts, including Mr. Sims Reeves. Then, on 11 June 1861, a week before the first concert was to be given, the music hall burned to the ground. The plaintiffs sued the music hall owners for breach of contract for failing to rent out the music hall to them and to recover the advertising costs. There was no clause within the contract itself which allocated the risk to the underlying facilities, except for the phrase "God's will permitting" at the end of the contract.

== Judgment ==
Mr Justice Blackburn began his judgement by finding that the agreement between the parties was a contract, despite their use of the term "lease". Under the common law of property in England at the time, under a lease the lessee would obtain legal possession of the premises during the lease period, while the "lease" at issue in this case specified that legal possession would remain with the defendants.

Blackburn J reasoned that the rule of absolute liability only applied to positive, definite contracts, not to those in which there was an express or implied condition underlying the contract. He further reasoned that the continued existence of the Music Hall in Surrey Gardens was an implied condition essential for the fulfilment of the contract. The destruction of the music hall was the fault of neither party and rendered the performance of the contract by either party impossible. Blackburn J cited the civil code of France and the Roman law for the proposition that when the existence of a particular thing is essential to a contract, and the thing is destroyed by no fault of the party selling it, the parties are freed from obligation to deliver the thing. He further analogized to a situation in which a contract requiring personal performance is made, and the party to perform dies, when under English common law the party's executors are not held liable. Blackburn J thus held that both parties were excused from their obligations under their contract.

== Importance ==
Until this case, parties to a contract were held to be absolutely bound and a failure to perform was not excused by radically changed circumstances. Instead, the contract was breached, and that gave rise to a claim for damages. This ruling, although quite narrow, opened the door for the modern doctrine of contract avoidance by frustration.

== See also ==
- Frustration in English law
- Impossibility of performance
