= Collegatary =

In civil law, a collegatary is a person to whom is left a legacy, as imparted by a will, in common with one or more other individuals; so called as being a joint legatary, or co-legatee.

== See also ==
- Barratry
- Condonation
- Allonge
