= The Common Law (book) =

1881 book by Oliver Wendell Holmes Jr

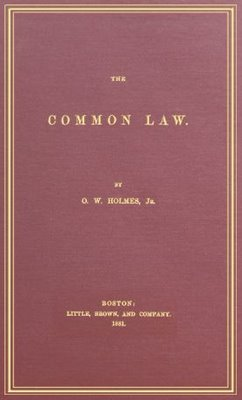
- Cover of the first edition of The Common Law.
- Author: Oliver Wendell Holmes Jr.
- Language: English
- Publication date: 1881
- Publication place: United States
- Media type: Paper
- Pages: 480
- ISBN: 978-0486267463

The Common Law is a book written by Oliver Wendell Holmes Jr. in 1881, 21 years before Holmes became an Associate Justice of the Supreme Court of the United States.

The book is about common law in the United States, including torts, property, contracts, and crime. It is written as a series of lectures. It has gone out of copyright and is available in full on the web at Project Gutenberg.

A famous aphorism appears on the first page of the book: "The life of the law has not been logic: it has been experience." Holmes's pronouncement is a qualification of a dictum by the famous seventeenth-century English jurist Sir Edward Coke: "Reason is the life of the law."
