= Allonge =

Legal term

An allonge (from French allonger, "to draw out") is a slip of paper affixed to a negotiable instrument, as a bill of exchange, for the purpose of receiving additional endorsements for which there may not be sufficient space on the bill itself. An endorsement written on the allonge is deemed to be written on the bill itself. An allonge is more usually met with in countries using the Napoleonic Code, as the code requires every endorsement to express the consideration. Under English law, the simple signature of the endorser on the bill, without additional words, is sufficient to operate as a negotiation and so an allonge is seldom necessary.

== See also ==
- Apostille
- Collegatary
- Rider (politics)
