= Colin Blackburn, Baron Blackburn =

Scottish judge (1813–1896)

The Right Honourable The Lord Blackburn PC
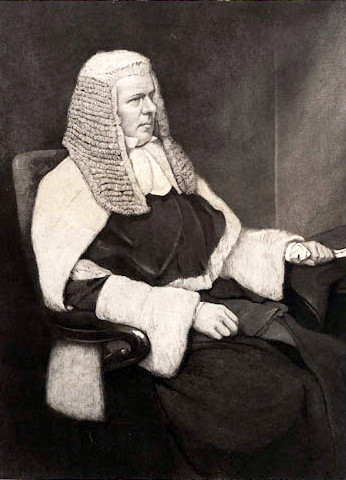

Lord of Appeal in Ordinary
- In office 10 October 1876 – 1887

Justice of the High Court
- In office 1 November 1875 – 1876

Justice of the Queen's Bench
- In office 27 June 1859 – 1 November 1875

Personal details
- Born: 18 May 1813
- Died: 8 January 1896 (aged 82) Doonholm, Ayrshire
- Relations: Peter Blackburn (brother); Hugh Blackburn (brother)
- Parent(s): John Blackburn; Rebecca Louise Gillies
- Education: University of Cambridge

Colin Blackburn, Baron Blackburn, PC (18 May 1813 – 8 January 1896) was a British lawyer and judge. The son of a Scottish clergyman, he was educated in Scotland and England, before joining the English bar. He was little known to the legal world before he was elevated from the junior bar to a puisne judgeship in the Court of Queen's Bench by Lord Campbell in 1859, a position he held until 1876, when he was appointed to the Court of Appeal. In October of that year, he was the first person to be appointed as a law lord under the provisions of the newly enacted Appellate Jurisdiction Act. He retired in 1886 and died ten years later.

== Life ==
Colin Blackburn was the second son of John Blackburn of Killearn, Stirlingshire, and Rebecca, daughter of the Rev. Colin Gillies. He was born on 18 May 1813. His elder brother, Peter Blackburn, represented Stirlingshire as a Conservative Member of Parliament from 1859 to 1865. Additionally, his younger brother was the renowned mathematician Hugh Blackburn.

Blackburn began his education at the Edinburgh Academy, followed by Eton and Trinity College, Cambridge. At the university, he earned his B.A. (eighth wrangler) in 1835 and later, his M.A. in 1838. In 1870, he received the honorary degree of LL.D. from the University of Edinburgh. He commenced his legal studies on 20 April 1835, as a student at Lincoln's Inn. Later, he migrated to the Inner Temple, where he was called to the bar on 23 November 1838, and elected an honorary bencher on 13 April 1877.

For some years after his call, he went the northern circuit in a briefless or almost briefless condition. He had no professional connection, no turn for politics, no political interest, and none of the advantages of person and address which make for success in advocacy. During this period employed himself in reporting and editing, with T. F. Ellis, eight volumes of the respected Ellis and Blackburn reports. Though his repute as a legal author led to his occasional employment in weighty mercantile cases, he was still a stuff gownsman, and better known in the courts as a reporter than as a pleader, when on the transference of Sir William Erle from the Court of Queen's Bench to the Chief Justice of the Common Pleas, Lord Chancellor Lord Campbell startled the profession by selecting him for the vacant puisne judgeship. He was appointed Justice of the Queen's Bench on 27 June 1859, and on 2 November following was invested with the coif. He was knighted on 24 April 1860.

== Judge ==
Few controversial issues came before him during his seventeen-year tenure of office as judge of first instance, but the dignity and impartiality with which he presided at the trial of the Manchester Fenians on 28 October 1867 were worthy of a more respected occasion, and his charge to the grand jury of Middlesex on the bill of indictment against the late governor of Jamaica, Edward John Eyre on 2 June 1868.

The consolidation of the courts effected by the Supreme Court of Judicature Act 1873 and the Supreme Court of Judicature Act 1875 gave Blackburn the status of Justice of the High Court, which numbered among its members no judge of more tried ability when the Appellate Jurisdiction Act 1876 authorized the reinforcement of the House of Lords by the creation of two judicial life peers, designated "Lords of appeal in ordinary".

He was raised to the life peerage on 10 October 1876, by the title of Baron Blackburn, of Killearn in the County of Stirlingshire, and took his seat in the House of Lords and was sworn of the Privy Council in the following month. He retired in December 1886. He died, unmarried, at his country seat, Doonholm, Ayrshire, on 8 January 1896.

== Career ==
Blackburn was a member of the royal commissions on the courts of law (1867) and the stock exchange (1877), and presided over the royal commission on the draft criminal code (1878). He was the author of a masterly Treatise on the Effect of the Contract of Sale on the Legal Rights of Property and Possession in Goods. Wares, and Merchandise, London, 1845, 8vo, which held its own as the standard textbook on the subject until displaced by the more comprehensive work of Judah P. Benjamin. A new edition, revised by J. C. Graham, appeared in 1885. As a reporter Blackburn collaborated with Thomas Flower Ellis.

Though greatly respected, he does not appear to have been popular. According to a well-known story, he informed a colleague that he intended to retire in vacation to avoid the trouble of a retirement dinner – the colleague cheerfully replied that this was quite unnecessary since no one would have turned up to the dinner anyway.

He was the author of a valuable work on the Law of Sales.

== Judgments ==
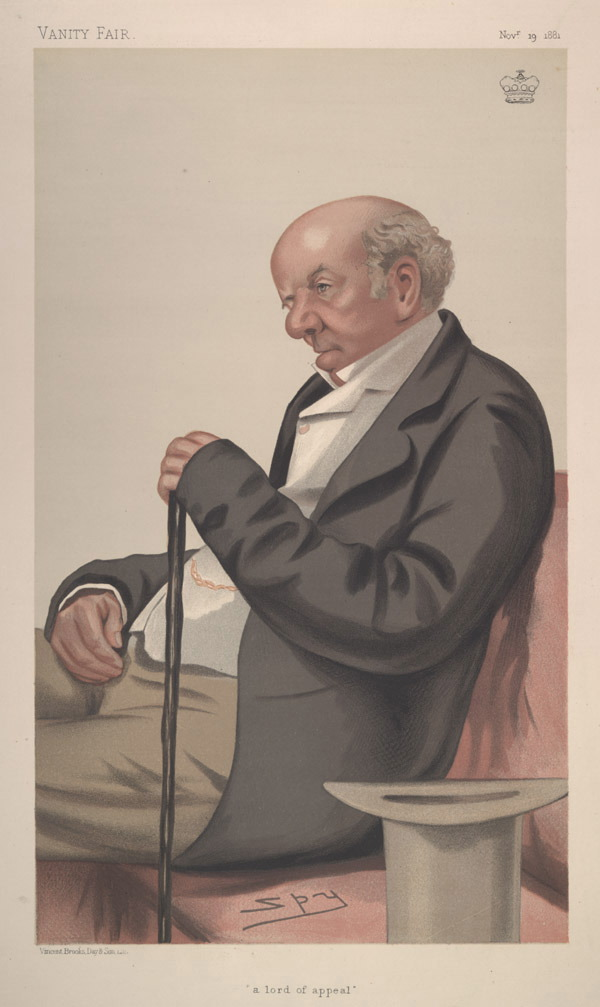
"a lord of appeal". Caricature by Spy published in Vanity Fair in 1881.

The following is a list of some of the cases in which Lord Blackburn gave judgment:

=== Queen's Bench ===
- Tweddle v Atkinson (1861) 1 B&S 393, 121 ER 762, privity and consideration
- Taylor v Caldwell (1863) 3 B & S 826, frustration
- R v Nelson and Brand (1867)
- Rylands v Fletcher [1868] UKHL 1, seminal strict liability case
- Smith v Hughes (1871) LR 6 QB 597, objective interpretation of conduct in contracts and mistakes
- Harris v Nickerson (1873) LR 8 QB 286, offer and acceptance at auctions
- R v Negus (1873) LR 2 CP 34, definition of control of worker
- Jackson v Union Marine Insurance (1874) 10 Common Pleas 125, contractual termination
- Ashbury Railway Carriage and Iron Co Ltd v Riche (1875) LR 7 HL 653, company objects clauses
- Poussard v Spiers and Pond (1876) 1 QBD 410, contractual termination and wrongful dismissal

=== House of Lords ===
- Brogden v Metropolitan Railway Company (1876–77) LR 2 App Cas 666
- Hughes v Metropolitan Railway Co (1877) 2 AC 439, promissory estoppel
- Orr-Ewing v Colquhoun (1877)
- Erlanger v New Sombrero Phosphate Co (1878) 3 App Cas 1218
- Pharmaceutical Society v London and Provincial Supply Association (1880)
- Speight v Gaunt (1883–84) LR 9 App Cas 1
- Foakes v Beer [1884] UKHL 1, [1881-85] All ER Rep 106, (1884) 9 App Cas 605; 54 LJQB 130; 51 LT 833; 33 WR 233 – a leading case on the legal concept of consideration involving part payment of debt as consideration.

Other notable cases in which Lord Blackburn delivered judgment:

- Glyn Mills & Co v East and West India Dock Co (1882) 7 App. Cas. 591

== Arms ==
Coat of arms of Colin Blackburn, Baron Blackburn
Crest A Stag's Head erased as in the Arms Escutcheon Argent on a Pale Sable three Stags' Heads erased Argent
