= Grant Gilmore =

American legal scholar

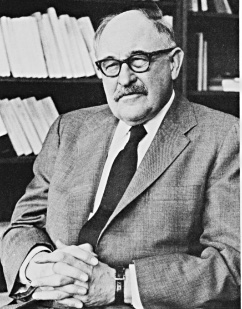
- Born: September 2, 1913; Boston, Massachusetts, U.S.
- Died: May 1, 1982 (aged 72); Norwich, Vermont, U.S.
- Occupation: Law professor
- Awards: Guggenheim Fellowship (1971); Sterling Professor (1973)

Academic background
- Education: Yale University (PhD, LLB)

Academic work
- Discipline: Constitutional law
- Institutions: Yale University; University of Chicago; Ohio State University; Vermont Law School

Grant Gilmore (April 8, 1910 – May 1, 1982) was an American law professor who taught at Yale Law School, the University of Chicago Law School, the College of Law (now Moritz College of Law) at the Ohio State University, and Vermont Law School. He was a scholar of commercial law and one of the principal drafters of Article 9 of the Uniform Commercial Code.

== Early life ==
Gilmore attended Boston Latin School and then went on to Yale University. He earned a PhD in Romance languages from Yale in 1936, with a doctoral dissertation about the 19th century French symbolist poet Mallarmé entitled "Stéphane Mallarmé: A Biography and Interpretation." He taught French for four years, at Lehigh University and then at Yale, before entering law school.

Gilmore obtained his LL.B. degree from Yale Law School in 1942. After John C. Jaqua was forced to resign as editor-in-chief of The Yale Law Journal upon being drafted for World War II, Gilmore took over for the remainder of academic year.

== Career ==
After working briefly at a Wall Street law firm, Gilmore entered the U.S. Navy, where he served in the Office of General Counsel. When released from the Navy in 1946, he began teaching at Yale Law School.

Gilmore was hired by Karl Llewellyn to assist in drafting Article 9 of the Uniform Commercial Code, which deals with secured transactions, contracts in which payment obligations are backed by a security taken against a party's personal property (that is, property other than real estate). Applying his criticism that no overarching theory can explain contract law, Gilmore recognized that Article 9 would be applied to more formal contracts than Article 2 agreements for the sale of goods, so he wrote rigid provisions.

In 1965, Gilmore left Yale Law School amid a dispute with Dean Eugene V. Rostow, beginning eight years of teaching at the University of Chicago Law School. That school was the birthplace of the law and economics approach to the study of law. During his eight years there Gilmore became increasingly disenchanted with the law school and with the right wing economists he said ran it, leading him to return to Yale in 1973.

He authored a number of books on various areas of commercial law, including secured transactions, admiralty law, and contract law. His most famous work is his survey and criticism of contract law, The Death of Contract, a book based on four lectures he gave at Ohio State University in 1970. Gilmore is also well known for the following passage from his 1977 book, The Ages of American Law:

Law reflects, but in no sense determines the moral worth of a society…. The better the society, the less law there will be. In Heaven, there will be no law, and the lion will lie down with the lamb…. The worse the society, the more law there will be. In Hell, there will be nothing but law, and due process will be meticulously observed.

== Personal life ==
Gilmore was the son of Ernest Augustus and Louise (Beerbohm) Gilmore. He married Helen Richter, a psychiatrist and member of the Yale medical school faculty, on March 26, 1934, and they had two children.

== Selected publications ==
- Gilmore, Grant. Security Interests in Personal Property (2 Volumes). 1st edition, Little, Brown & Company, 1965; 2nd edition, The Lawbook Exchange, 1999. ISBN 1-886363-81-1
- Gilmore, Grant. The Death of Contract. The Ohio State University Press, 1974, 2nd edition 1995, Ronald K.L. Collins, editor: ISBN 0-8142-0676-X
- Gilmore, Grant & Black, Charles. The Law of Admiralty. Foundation Press, 1975. OCLC 1228473.
- Gilmore, Grant (1977). The Ages of American Law. Storers Lecture Series. New Haven, Connecticut: Yale University Press. ISBN 0300023529. (second edition, with new foreword and final chapter by Philip Bobbitt, Yale University Press, 2014. ISBN 9780300189919)
