= Contract sanctity =

Contract sanctity is the concept that U.S. agricultural products already contracted to be exported should not be subject to government cancellation because of short supply, national security, or foreign policy reasons. The 1990 farm bill (P.L. 101–624) provides for contract sanctity by prohibiting the President from restricting the export of any agricultural commodity already under contract to be delivered within 270 days from the date an embargo is imposed, except during national emergency or war.
