= Secured transactions in the United States =

Secured transactions in the United States are an important part of the law and economy of the country. By enabling lenders to take a security interest in collateral (that is, the assets of debtors), the law of secured transactions provides lenders with assurance of legal relief in case of default by the borrower. The availability of such remedies encourages lenders to lend capital at lower interest rates, which in turn facilitates the free flow of credit and stimulates economic growth.

Article 9 of the Uniform Commercial Code (UCC), as adopted by all fifty states, generally governs secured transactions where security interests are taken in personal property. ^{1} It regulates creation and enforcement of security interests in movable property, intangible property, and fixtures. UCC Article 9 replaced a wildly diverse array of security devices that had evolved in the various states during the 19th and early 20th centuries, in response to the reluctance of U.S. courts to enforce general nonpossessory security interests as either against public policy or because they were perceived as fraudulent conveyances. The drafters of UCC Article 9, particularly Grant Gilmore, successfully argued that since historical experience showed that disfavoring such security interests would not prevent creditors from requesting them or debtors from trying to give them by any means necessary, and because they were clearly economically useful, the better path was to develop a unified, simplified law of security interests.

Transactions where security interests are taken in real property are regulated not by Article 9, but by real property laws that vary among jurisdictions. However, the assignment or conveyance of a contract secured by real property may be regulated by Article 3 to the extent that the contract is a negotiable instrument. Both must be distinguished from a secured interest in a promissory note that is secured by a mortgage or deed of trust on real property, which is regulated by Article 9. This latter distinction is important in the context of the sale and purchase of promissory notes secured by real property.

There are a variety of situations in which this distinction is important. For example, a non-depository mortgage lender may fund their operations with a warehouse line of credit, while a distressed loan workout specialist may obtain a line of credit. The first makes loans for the purchase of real property; the second will acquire nonperforming loans at a discount from their face value (and then will either renegotiate them or foreclose on the underlying collateral). In either situation, the mortgage lender or workout specialist's interest in underlying real property collateral will be secured under state real property law. But their lender's interest in the notes secured by the underlying collateral will be secured under Article 9.

Security interests are particularly valuable in bankruptcy, because creditors who have security interests in a bankrupt debtor's estate take priority over creditors who lack such interests (unsecured creditors) in the distribution of the debtor's assets.

== Attachment and perfection ==
A security interest becomes enforceable against the collateral as soon as it attaches. Attachment requires three things: (i) that the debtor have rights in the collateral or the power to convey rights; (ii) that value be given; and (iii) in most cases, that the debtor have authenticated a security agreement that adequately describes the collateral. See U.C.C. § 9-203. Subject to some minor restrictions relating to consumer goods and commercial tort claims, a security interest can encumber after-acquired property—that is, it can attach to property the debtor acquires after authentication of the security agreement. See U.C.C. § 9-204. Value can include a new loan or an old debt. See U.C.C. § 1-204.

Attachment of a security interest does not ensure that the secured party's interest in the collateral will be superior to the interest of other lienors or subsequent buyers, lessees, or licensee. In general, to obtain priority over such other claimants, the security interest must be "perfected." Although some security interests are perfected automatically upon attachment, see U.C.C. § 9-309, for most perfection must be achieved through compliance with statutory procedure designed to give the world notice that the collateral is encumbered. The most common method of perfection is through filing a financing statement (often referred to by its form number: UCC-1) in the appropriate state office (usually the office of the Secretary of State) in the U.S. state in which the debtor is located. See U.C.C. §§ 9-301, 9-310. For real property, the creditor records a security instrument such as a mortgage or deed of trust in the county where the real property is located.

== Notes ==
- ^1 Even Louisiana, much of whose commercial law is based on Continental civil law, and not on the Anglo-American common law from which the UCC ultimately derives, has adopted Article 9 to govern its secured transactions. See La. Rev. Stat. Ann. tit. 10, §§ 9-101 to -710 (West 2004).
