= Coronation cases =

UK legal cases regarding contracts

The Coronation cases were a group of appellate opinions in English law cases, all arising out of contracts that had been made for accommodation for viewing the celebrations surrounding the coronation of King Edward VII and Queen Alexandra, originally scheduled for 26 June 1902. Many owners of buildings along the coronation procession route had rented their front rooms to others who hoped to guarantee themselves a view of the procession, or rented out boats from which to watch the associated naval review. The king fell ill with an abscess of the abdominal wall two days before the planned coronation and it was postponed until 9 August. The renters were not inclined to pay top prices—or pay at all—for rooms on an ordinary day.

In general, the contracts were voided on the ground of frustration of purpose. Certain contracts which did not mention that the purpose was to view the coronation festivities were upheld, however.

== List of cases ==
The cases included:

- Krell v Henry [1903] 2 K.B. 740 (contract voidable on the basis of a frustrated purpose that was implied into the contract from extrinsic factors)
- Chandler v Webster [1904] 1 KB 493 (neither an advance fee already paid nor the balance to be paid after the coronation were recoverable; overruled by the Law Reform (Frustrated Contracts) Act 1943)
- Herne Bay Steamboat Co v Hutton [1903] 2 K.B. 683 (frustration of one purpose did not void a contract also made for a different, non-frustrated purpose)
- Hobson v Pattenden & Co (1903) 19 TLR 186
- Clark v Lindsay (1903) 19 TLR 202
- Griffith v Brymer (1903) 19 TLR 434 – In this matter, the parties entered into the contract after the decision had been made (but not publicized) to operate on the king. The contract was ruled to be void, not under the doctrine of frustration of purpose as in other Coronation cases, but on the grounds of mistake. The crucial difference is that, unlike the other coronation cases where a later event made the contract fundamentally different, in this case the parties entered into the contract under the mistaken assumption of fact that the coronation would take place.
