= Krell v Henry =

Precedent in English contract law

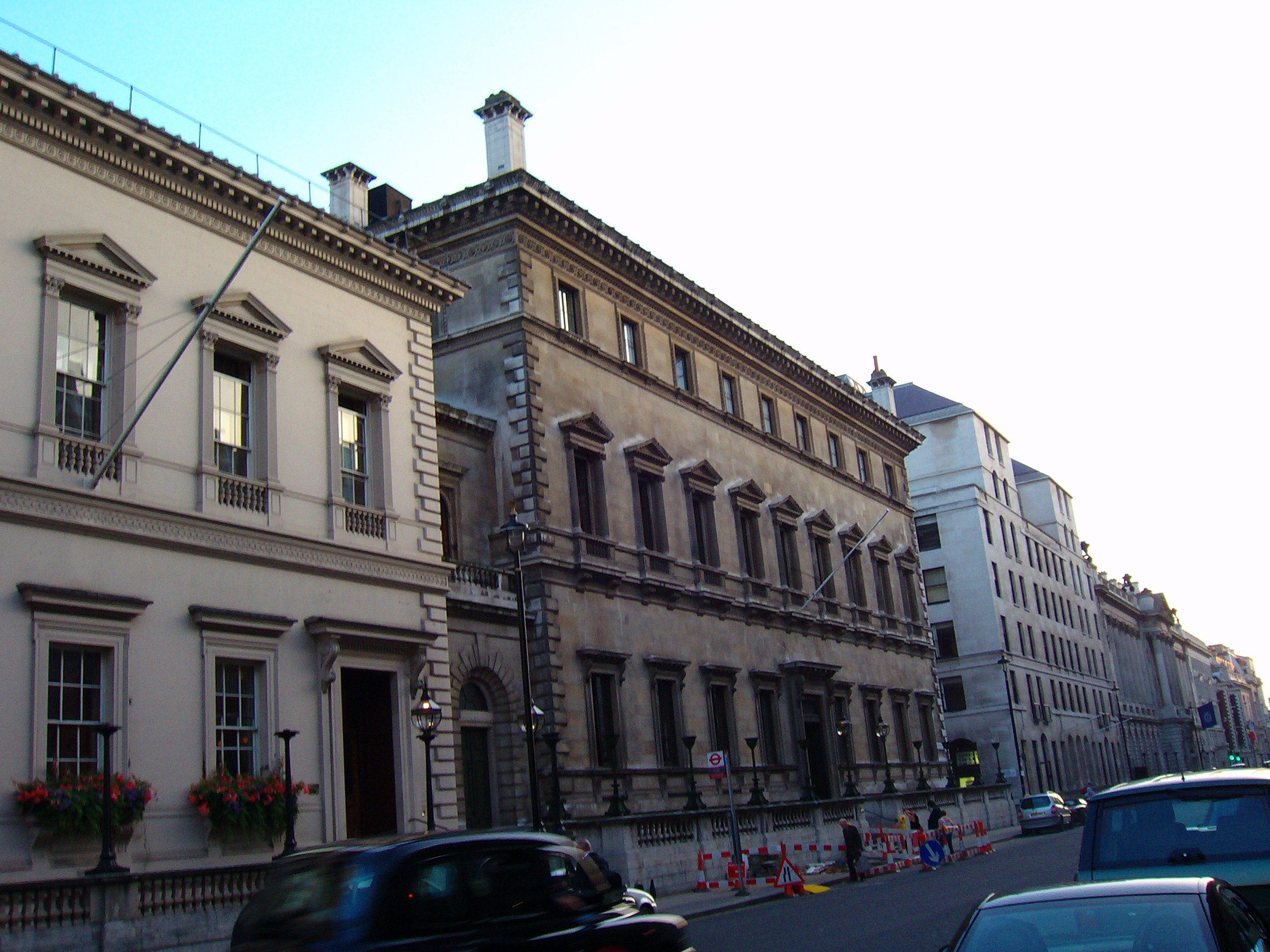
- Court: Court of Appeal
- Full case name: Paul Krell v CS Henry
- Citation: [1903] 2 KB 740

Case history
- Prior action: Appeal from Darling J

Court membership
- Judges sitting: Vaughan Williams LJ, Romer LJ and Stirling LJ

Keywords
- Frustration

Krell v Henry [1903] 2 KB 740 is an English case which sets forth the doctrine of frustration of purpose in contract law. It is one of a group of cases, known as the "coronation cases", which arose from events surrounding the coronation of Edward VII and Alexandra in 1902.

== Facts ==
The defendant, CS Henry, agreed by contract on 20 June 1902, to rent a flat at 56A Pall Mall from the plaintiff, Paul Krell, for the purpose of watching the coronation procession of Edward VII scheduled for 26 and 27 June. The housekeeper of the premises had informed Henry that he would have an excellent view of the procession from the room.

Desiring to secure the rental of Krell's flat for the purpose of observing the coronation procession, Henry wrote the following letter to Krell's solicitor:

I am in receipt of yours of the 18th instant, inclosing form of agreement for the suite of chambers on the third floor at 56A, Pall Mall, which I have agreed to take for the two days, the 26th and 27th instant, for the sum of 75l. For reasons given you I cannot enter into the agreement, but as arranged over the telephone I inclose herewith cheque for 25l. as deposit, and will thank you to confirm to me that I shall have the entire use of these rooms during the days (not the nights) of the 26th and 27th instant. You may rely that every care will be taken of the premises and their contents. On the 24th inst. I will pay the balance, viz., 50l., to complete the 75l. agreed upon.

The defendant received the following reply from the plaintiff's solicitor:

I am in receipt of your letter of to-day's date inclosing cheque for 25l. deposit on your agreeing to take Mr. Krell's chambers on the third floor at 56A, Pall Mall for the two days, the 26th and 27th June, and I confirm the agreement that you are to have the entire use of these rooms during the days (but not the nights), the balance, 50l., to be paid to me on Tuesday next the 24th instant.

The parties agreed on a price of £75, but nowhere in their written correspondence mentioned the coronation ceremony explicitly. Henry paid a deposit of £25 to Krell for the use of the flat, but when the procession did not take place on the days originally set, on the grounds of the King's illness, Henry refused to pay the remaining £50. Krell brought suit against Henry to recover the remaining balance of £50, and Henry countersued to recover his deposit in the amount of £25.

== Judgment ==
Darling held in the initial case that there was an implied condition in the contract, using Taylor v. Caldwell and The Moorcock, and gave judgment for the defendant on both the claim and the counterclaim.

The Court of Appeal dismissed the plaintiff's appeal. Lord Justice Vaughan Williams framed the legal question in this case as whether there was an implied condition to the contract: whether or not while the contract was made, the two parties knew that the reason behind the contract was for Henry to watch the coronation procession.

The principle that an implied condition that ceases to exist voids the contract stems from the case of Taylor v Caldwell, which, in turn, was borrowed from Roman law. The principle was extended, in later cases, to situations in which an underlying condition that was essential to the performance of the contract, rather than simply being a necessary condition, ceases to exist.

Vaughan Williams LJ held that such a condition (here, the timely occurrence of the coronation proceeding) need not be explicitly mentioned in the contract itself but rather may be inferred from the extrinsic circumstances surrounding the contract. Thus, the parol evidence rule was inapplicable here.

Firstly, he examined the substance of the contract, and then determined whether the contract was founded on the assumption of the existence of a particular state of affairs.

He then determined that given the affidavits of the parties, Krell had granted Henry a licence to use the rooms for a particular purpose: watching the coronation. He analogized the situation to one in which a man hired a taxicab to take him to a race. If the race did not occur on the particular day the passenger had thought, he would not be discharged from paying the driver. However, unlike the situation in the case, the cab did not have any special qualification, as the room did, its view of the street. Furthermore, the cancellation of the coronation could not reasonably have been anticipated by the parties at the time the contract was made.

Romer LJ said,

With some doubt I have also come to the conclusion that this case is governed by the principle on which Taylor v Caldwell was decided, and accordingly that the appeal must be dismissed. The doubt I have felt was whether the parties to the contract now before us could be said, under the circumstances, not to have had at all in their contemplation the risk that for some reason or other the coronation processions might not take place on the days fixed, or, if the processions took place, might not pass so as to be capable of being viewed from the rooms mentioned in the contract; and whether, under this contract, that risk was not undertaken by the defendant. But on the question of fact as to what was in the contemplation of the parties at the time, I do not think it right to differ from the conclusion arrived at by Vaughan Williams L.J., and (as I gather) also arrived at by my brother Stirling. This being so, I concur in the conclusions arrived at by Vaughan Williams L.J. in his judgment, and I do not desire to add anything to what he has said so fully and completely.

Stirling LJ concurred.

== See also ==
- The Moorcock
- Herne Bay Steamboat Co v Hutton
- Chandler v Webster
- Frustration in English law
