= Hirachand Punumchand v Temple =

- Court: Court of Appeal of England and Wales
- Full case name: Hirachand Punumchand -v- Richard Durand Temple
- Decided: 1911
- Citation: [1911] 2 KB 330

Court membership
- Judges sitting: Fletcher Moulton LJ, Vaughan Williams LJ

Keywords
- accord and satisfaction

Hirachand Punamchand v Temple [1911] 2 KB 330 is often cited as one of the exceptions to the accord and satisfaction rule laid out in Foakes v Beer. In that case, it is held that an agreement to accept part payment of a debt cannot validly discharge the entire debt. In Hirachand Punamchand v Temple, part payment of a debt is held to be valid because it is supplied by a third party and not the debtor (originally established in Cook v Lister (1863) 13 CBNS 543).

== Background ==
The defendant, Lieutenant Temple had gotten indebted to money lenders (plaintiffs) issuing them a promissory note; after no money was forthcoming from Lieutenant Temple, the plaintiffs approached his father, Sir Richard Carnac Temple, 2nd Baronet, and asked him to pay the debt for him. Sir Richard in reply, got his solicitors to send the moneylender a cheque for 1,500 rupees, which was less than the full amount owed, with a letter attached that this was tendered as a "full settlement of his son’s account".

The money lenders cashed the cheque but then proceeded to sue the debtor (Lieutenant Temple) for the outstanding balance.

== Held ==
The Court of Appeal ruled that the defendant was not liable for the remaining balance owed to the moneylender.

Fletcher Moulton LJ said in the ruling:

But in the present case we are dealing with the question of the effect of money paid by a third person [and not by the debtor]. In such a case there is no difference between payment of the total amount and payment of a portion of it only, so long as it is paid in settlement of the debt. If a third person steps in and gives a consideration for the discharge of the debtor, it does not matter whether he does it in meal or in malt, or what proportion the amount given bears to the amount of the debt. Here the money was paid by a third person, and I have no doubt that, upon the acceptance of that money by the plaintiffs with full knowledge of the terms on which it was offered, the debt was absolutely extinguished.

The net effect of the father's intervention was to essentially extinguish the original credit note; in the words of Vaughan Williams LJ:

the document had ceased to be a negotiable instrument quite as much as if there had been on the acceptance of the draft by the plaintiffs an erasure of the writing of the signature of the note

He had previously said (regarding the draft):

They not only kept it, but they cashed it, and if they changed their minds afterwards, it was too late.

Thus arriving at an essentially similar position to that of Willes J in Cook v Lister (1863) 13 CBNS 543 (in which he expressed the view that the "effect of such as agreement between a creditor and a third party with regard to the debt is to render it impossible for the creditor afterwards to sue the debtor for it") but by virtue of rather different reasoning.
