= Re Atkinson =

- Court: Court of Appeal
- Full case name: Re Atkinson, Barbers' Company v Grose-Smith
- Decided: 1 June 1904
- Citation: [1904] 2 Ch 160

Court membership
- Judges sitting: Vaughan Williams LJ; Romer LJ; Cozens-Hardy LJ

Keywords
- trusts, apportionment between beneficiaries, remainderman

Re Atkinson, Barbers' Company v Grose-Smith [1904] 2 Ch 160 is an English trusts law case, which lays down a rule of equity relating to the disposition by the trustees of an authorised mortgage security where the security forms part of a trust fund, and the beneficiaries of the trust fund include a tenant for life and a remainderman. Where the security is sold and the proceeds are insufficient to satisfy the principal and interest in full, it is necessary to determine the way in which the loss shall be shared as between the tenant for life and the remainderman. The sum realised by the sale must be apportioned between the life tenant and the remainderman in the proportion that the amount due for the arrears of interest bears to the amount due in respect of principal.

The rule also applies to debenture stock, but not to dividends or arrears of dividends on preference shares.

== Facts ==
By his will dated 30 August 1858 John Atkinson gave his residuary estate upon trust whereby the income would be distributed to his eleven nephews and nieces for life, and after they were deceased, the capital was to be paid over to the Barbers' Company upon certain charitable trusts. Atkinson died on 8 November 1861.

The estate was worth approximately £29,000 and was invested in a mortgage loan secured over three farms at 5 per cent. In January 1889 the mortgage fell into arrears and in May of that year the trustees went into possession. It was anticipated that upon the sale of the farms, the purchase price would not be sufficient to pay all of the accrued interest as well as the outstanding capital amounts. Accordingly, the Barbers' Company brought a summons in March 1892 to determine whether or not the mortgage ought to be foreclosed in this manner. The court ordered that the farms be sold. The first farm was sold for £4,600, and in 1903 the nieces and nephews as life tenants took out a further summons to determine (amongst other things) the entitlement as between the life tenants (entitled to the income) and the remainderman (entitled to the capital) in relation to those proceeds of sale.

The case came before Kekewich J, who followed his earlier decision in Re Alston [1901] 2 Ch 584. The Barbers' Company appealed to the Court of Appeal.

== Judgment ==
The Court of Appeal unanimously agreed that the appeal should be dismissed, and the decision and reasoning of Kekewich J upheld.

Vaughan Williams LJ gave the first judgment. He considered the matter of apportioning the 4,600 pounds from the sale of the first farm as between the life tenants (who were entitled to interest arising) and the remainderman (who was entitled to the capital, after the last of the life tenants had died). He acknowledged that the adjustment could not be made at this time, but that the Court could specify all the factors which were necessary to take account of when making that apportionment. He concluded that the loss should be borne with "rateable equality" between the two classes of beneficiaries. He approved the statement in Re Moore (1885) 54 LJ Ch 432 at 434:

The apportionment of [the sum to be dealt with] will be in the proportions which [the amount due for capital] and [the amount due to the tenant for life for arrears of interest] bear to one another.

Romer LJ gave a concurring judgment, in which he also summarised the relevant legal authorities and agreed with the ultimate conclusion of Vaughan Williams LJ.

Cozens-Hardy LJ confined himself to indicating he agreed with the earlier judgments and those principles.

== Subsequent cases ==
The case is treated as binding precedent, and is often referred to as the rule in Re Atkinson. The rule has been held to apply to debenture stock, but not to dividends or arrears of dividends on preference shares.

== See also ==
- General duties of trustees
- Meinhard v Salmon
