= Fibrosa Spolka Akcyjna v Fairbairn Lawson Combe Barbour Ltd =

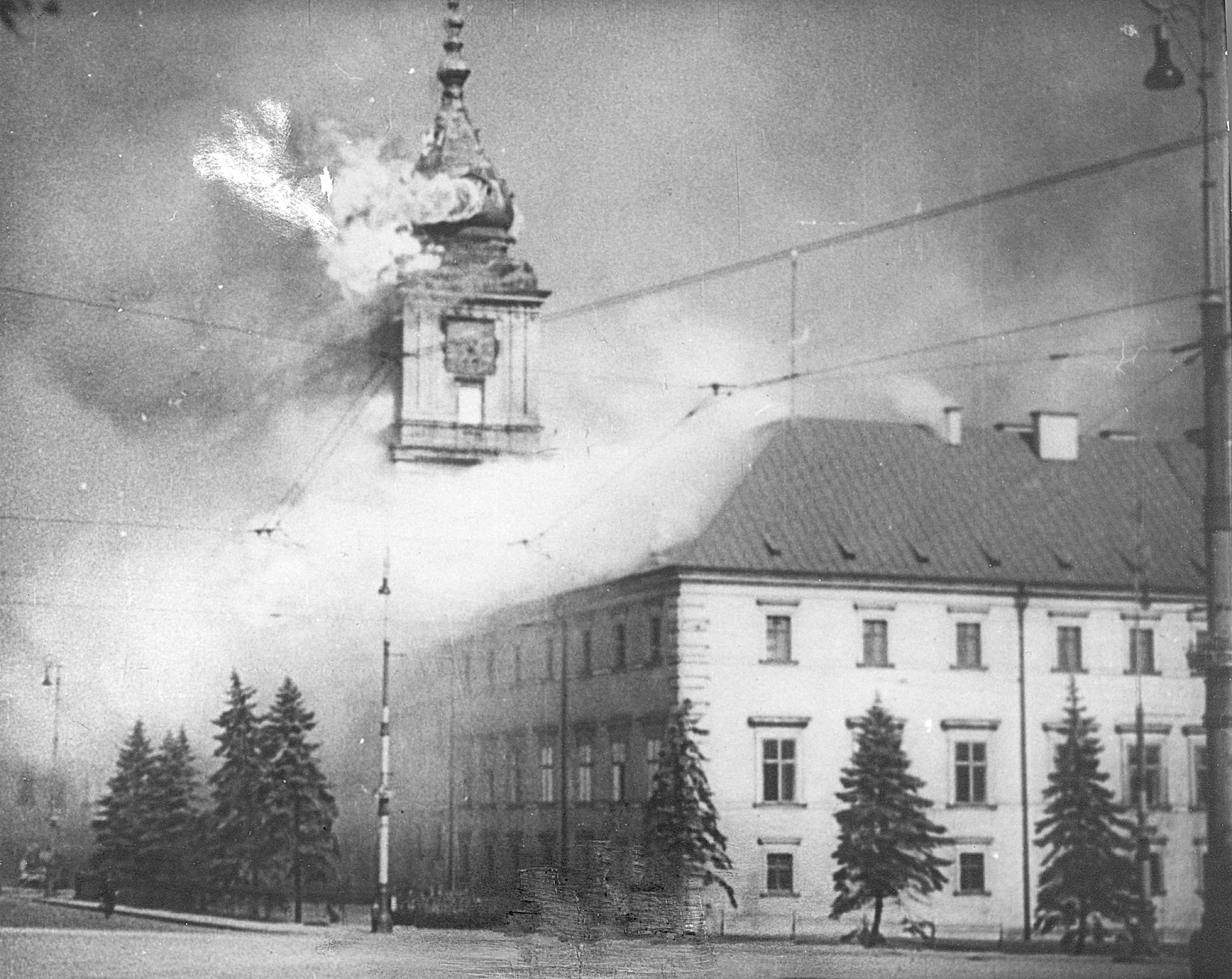
- The Invasion of Poland 1939
- Court: House of Lords
- Decided: 15 June 1942
- Citations: [1942] UKHL 4, [1943] AC 32, [1942] 2 All ER 122

Court membership
- Judges sitting: Lord Atkin LC, Lord Russell of Killowen, Lord Macmillan, Lord Wright, Lord Roche, Lord Porter

Case opinions
- Lord Wright

Keywords
- Frustration

Fibrosa Spolka Akcyjna v Fairbairn Lawson Combe Barbour Ltd [1942] UKHL 4 is a leading House of Lords decision on the doctrine of frustration in English contract law.

== Facts ==
Fibrosa was a textile company based in Wilno, then in Poland (today Vilnius, capital of Lithuania). In July 1939, it entered into a contract with Fairbairn Lawson Combe Barbour Ltd, a British firm, to buy industrial machinery for its plant in Gdynia for £4,800. The contract was signed on 12 July 1939 and, the following week, Fibrosa made an advanced payment of £1,000. The machines were expected to arrive within three to four months.

On 1 September 1939, Poland was invaded by Nazi Germany. The United Kingdom declared war on Germany on 3 September, entering World War II. The following week, Fibrosa's agents in the UK contacted Fairbairn to request that the initial £1,000 payment be refunded, as "it is now quite evident that the delivery of the machines on order for Poland cannot take place". Fairbairn refused. On 1 May 1940, Fibrosa's agents initiated legal proceedings.

The lower courts sided with Fairbairn, based on the authority of Chandler v Webster (1904). This held that, where a contract had been frustrated by a supervening event, "the loss lies where it falls". As a result, sums paid or rights accrued under the contract before the frustrating event occurs cannot be reclaimed but that all obligations falling due after it are discharged. Consequently, the lower courts rejected Fibrosa's claim to recover the £1,000.

== Judgment ==
The House of Lords found in favour of Fibrosa. Viscount Simon was critical of the Chandler case and found that it would apply only where there has been no failure of the consideration. However, in the circumstances, there was a failure of the consideration as Fibrosa had received none of the machinery ordered. This frustrated contract would not be subject to the rule in the Chandler decision, and so Fibrosa would succeed.

Lord Wright said the claim was based on unjust enrichment.

My Lords, the claim in the action was to recover a prepayment of 1000l. made on account of the price under a contract which had been frustrated. The claim was for money paid for a consideration which had failed. It is clear that any civilized system of law is bound to provide remedies for cases of what has been called unjust enrichment or unjust benefit, that is to prevent a man from retaining the money of or some benefit derived from another which it is against conscience that he should keep. Such remedies in English law are generically different from remedies in contract or in tort, and are now recognized to fall within a third category of the common law which has been called quasi-contract or restitution. The root idea was stated by three Lords of Appeal, Lord Shaw, Lord Sumner and Lord Carson, in R. E. Jones, Ld. v. Waring & Gillow, Ld, which dealt with a particular species of the category, namely, money paid under a mistake of fact. Lord Sumner referring to Kelly v Solari, where money had been paid by an insurance company under the mistaken impression that it was due to an executrix under a policy which had in fact been cancelled, said: "There was no real intention on the company's part to enrich her." Payment under a mistake of fact is only one head of this category of the law. Another class is where, as in this case, there is prepayment on account of money to be paid as consideration for the performance of a contract which in the event becomes abortive and is not performed, so that the money never becomes due. There was in such circumstances no intention to enrich the payee. This is the class of claims for the recovery of money paid for a consideration which has failed. Such causes of action have long been familiar and were assumed to be common-place by Holt CJ in Holmes v Hall in 1704. Holt C.J. was there concerned only about the proper form of action and took the cause of the action as beyond question. He said: "If A give money to B to pay to C upon C's giving writings, etc., and C will not do it, indebit will lie for A against B for so much money received to his use. And many such actions have been maintained for earnests in bargains, when the bargainor would not perform, and for premiums for insurance, when the ship, etc., did not go the voyage." The Chief Justice is there using earnest as meaning a prepayment on account of the price, not in the modern sense of an irrevocable payment to bind the bargain, and he is recognizing that the indebitatus assumpsit had by that time been accepted as the appropriate form of action in place of the procedure which had been used in earlier times to enforce these claims such as debt, account or case.

By 1760 actions for money had and received had increased in number and variety. Lord Mansfield C.J., in a familiar passage in Moses v Macferlan, sought to rationalise the action for money had and received, and illustrated it by some typical instances. "It lies," he said, "for money paid by mistake; or upon a consideration which happens to fail; or for money got through imposition (express, or implied;) or extortion; or oppression; or an undue advantage taken of the plaintiff's situation, contrary to laws made for the protection of persons under those circumstances. In one word, the gist of this kind of action is, that the defendant, upon the circumstances of the case, is obliged by the ties of natural justice and equity to refund the money." Lord Mansfield prefaced this pronouncement by observations 136 which are to be noted. "If the defendant be under an obligation from the ties of natural justice, to refund; the law implies a debt and gives this action [sc. indebitatus assumpsit] founded in the equity of the plaintiff's case, as it were, upon a contract ('quasi ex contractu' as the Roman law expresses it)." Lord Mansfield does not say that the law implies a promise. The law implies a debt or obligation which is a different thing. In fact, he denies that there is a contract; the obligation is as efficacious as if it were upon a contract. The obligation is a creation of the law, just as much as an obligation in tort. The obligation belongs to a third class, distinct from either contract or tort, though it resembles contract rather than tort. This statement of Lord Mansfield has been the basis of the modern law of quasi-contract, notwithstanding the criticisms which have been launched against it. Like all large generalizations, it has needed and received qualifications in practice. There is, for *63 instance, the qualification that an action for money had and received does not lie for money paid under an erroneous judgment or for moneys paid under an illegal or excessive distress. The law has provided other remedies as being more convenient. The standard of what is against conscience in this context has become more or less canalized or defined, but in substance the juristic concept remains as Lord Mansfield left it.

The gist of the action is a debt or obligation implied, or, more accurately, imposed, by law in much the same way as the law enforces as a debt the obligation to pay a statutory or customary impost. This is important because some confusion seems to have arisen though perhaps only in recent times when the true nature of the forms of action have become obscured by want of user. If I may borrow from another context the elegant phrase of Viscount Simon L.C. in United Australia Ltd v Barclays Bank Ltd, there has sometimes been, as it seems to me, "a misreading of technical rules, now happily swept away." The writ of indebitatus assumpsit involved at least two averments, the debt or obligation and the assumpsit. The former was the basis of the claim and was the real cause of action. The latter was merely fictitious and could not be traversed, but was necessary to enable the convenient and liberal form of action to be used in such cases. This fictitious assumpsit or promise was wiped out by the Common Law Procedure Act 1852. As Bullen and Leake (Precedents of Pleading, 3rd ed., p. 36) points out, this Act, by s. 3, provided that the plaintiff was no longer required to specify the particular form of action in which he sued, and by s. 49 that (inter alia) the statement of promises in indebitatus counts which there was no need to prove were to be omitted; "the action of indebitatus assumpsit," the authors add, "is [that is by 1868] virtually become obsolete." Lord Atkin in the United Australia case 138, after instancing the case of the blackmailer, says: "The man has my money which I have not delivered to him with any real intention of passing to him the property. I sue him because he has the actual property taken." He adds: "These fantastic resemblances of contracts invented in order to meet requirements of the law as to forms of action which have now disappeared should not in these days be allowed to affect actual rights." Yet the ghosts of the forms of action have been allowed at times to intrude in the ways of the living and impede vital functions of the law. Thus in Sinclair v Brougham, Lord Sumner stated that "all these causes of action [sc. for money had and received] are common species of the genus assumpsit. All now rest, and long have rested, upon a notional or imputed promise to repay." This observation, which was not necessary for the decision of the case, obviously does not mean that there is an actual promise of the party. The phrase "notional or implied promise" is only a way of describing a debt or obligation arising by construction of law. The claim for money had and received always rested on a debt or obligation which the law implied or more accurately imposed, whether the procedure actually in vogue at any time was debt or account or case or indebitatus assumpsit. Even the fictitious assumpsit disappeared after the Act of 1852. I prefer Lord Sumner's explanation of the cause of action in Jones's case. This agrees with the words of Lord Atkin which I have just quoted, yet serious legal writers have seemed to say that these words of the great judge in Sinclair v Brougham closed the door to any theory of unjust enrichment in English law. I do not understand why or how. It would indeed be a reductio ad absurdum of the doctrine of precedents. In fact, the common law still employs the action for money had and received as a practical and useful, if not complete or ideally perfect, instrument to prevent unjust enrichment, aided by the various methods of technical equity which are also available, as they were found to be in Sinclair v Brougham.

Must, then, the court stay its hand in what would otherwise appear to be an ordinary case for the repayment of money paid in advance on account of the purchase price under a contract for the sale of goods merely because the contract has become impossible of performance and the consideration has failed for that reason? The defendant has the plaintiff's money. There was no intention to enrich him in the events which happened. No doubt, when money is paid under a contract it can only be claimed back as for failure of consideration where the contract is terminated as to the future. Characteristic instances are where it is dissolved by frustration or impossibility or by the contract becoming abortive for any reason not involving fault on the part of the plaintiff where the consideration, if entire, has entirely failed, or where, if it is severable, it has entirely failed as to the severable residue, as in Rugg v Minett. The claim for repayment is not based on the contract which is dissolved on the frustration but on the fact that the defendant has received the money and has on the events which have supervened no right to keep it.

== Commentary ==
In essence, having decided that the contract was frustrated (as to continue would have been treasonable), the court held that the entire deposit was recoverable by Fibrosa, given the total absence of consideration from the English supplier. However, this decision raised more questions: "What if some machinery had been delivered? What if Fairbain had invested heavily in plant and materials prior to the contract?". The UK Parliament recognised that this war against the Nazis would give rise to numerous similar claims so, with admirable speed, they enacted the Law Reform (Frustrated Contracts) Act 1943 (6 & 7 Geo. 6. c. 40), which provided that:

- Monies paid out before frustration are recoverable afterwards.
- Monies due before frustration are no longer due afterwards.
- A party who has obtained a valuable benefit under the contract may have to pay for it if the court considers it just.
- A party who has incurred expenses in respect of the contract before the frustrating event may recover such expenses from the other party if the court considers it just.

== See also ==
- Chandler v Webster
- Frustration in English law
