= HBF Dalgety Ltd v Morton =

- Court: High Court of New Zealand
- Full case name: HBF Dalgety Limited v John Gilbert Morton & Eleanor Dianne Morton
- Decided: 26 June 1987
- Citation: [1987] 1 NZLR 411
- Transcript: High Court judgment

Court membership
- Judges sitting: Hillyer, J

Keywords
- accord and satisfaction

HBF Dalgety Ltd v Morton [1987] 1 NZLR 411 is a leading case in New Zealand regarding accord and satisfaction; it reinforces the English case of Foakes v Beer in New Zealand.

== Facts ==
HBF Dalgety, a real estate agency, sold on behalf of Mr Morton his farm, for which he was later charged the standard fee of $9,768.98. Two weeks after being invoiced this amount, Mr Morton sent back the invoice with the note attached of "my estimate of costs on a 'work done' basis, $2,450", and attached a cheque for $2,450, which was duly banked. HBF Dalgety then wrote a letter to Mr Morton saying they had not accepted his cheque as full settlement, and demanded he pay the balance of its fee of $7,318.98 ($13,645 in 2011 adjusted for inflation), which Mr Morton subsequently refused to pay, claiming accord and satisfaction.

== Decision ==
As the court ruled that there was no genuine dispute on this debt, there was neither any "accord" nor any "satisfaction" and so Mr Morton was ordered to pay the full amount claimed. Hillyer J said

It seems to me as a matter of ordinary common sense, that if at the time a person receives a cheque he writes a letter saying that he is not accepting the cheque in full settlement, it would be hard to hold that he was behaving in such a way as to make people believe that he was
