= Chandler v Webster =

1904 English contract law case

- Court: Court of Appeal
- Citation: [1904] 1 KB 493

Court membership
- Judges sitting: Lord Collins MR, Romer LJ and Mathew LJ

Keywords
- Frustration

Chandler v Webster [1904], 1 KB 493 is an English contract law case concerning frustration. It is one of several coronation cases which appeared in the courts after King Edward VII fell ill and his coronation was postponed.

== Facts ==
Mr Webster agreed to let Mr Chandler a room on Pall Mall to watch the king's coronation on 26 June 1902 for £141 15s (equivalent to £14,900 in 2025). It was understood between the parties that the money for the room should be paid before the procession. Mr Chandler hired the room with the intention of erecting a stand and selling tickets.

On 10 June Mr Chandler wrote to Mr Webster saying:

I beg to confirm my purchase of the first-floor room of the Electric Lighting Board at 7, Pall Mall, to view the procession on Thursday, June 26, for the sum of £141, 15s., which amount is now due. I shall be obliged if you will take the room on sale, and I authorize you to sell separate seats in the room, for which I will erect a stand. If the seats thus sold in the ordinary way of business do not realize the above amount by June 26, I agree to pay you the balance to make up such amount of £141, 15s.

Mr Chandler paid £100 on 19 June but then the king fell ill. The question was whether the £100 could be recovered by Mr Chandler, or whether Mr Webster could demand the balance.

== Judgment ==
=== High Court ===
Wright J held that the plaintiff was not entitled to recover the £100 which he had paid, and that, on the construction of the letter of 10 June, it appeared that the balance was not payable until after the procession, and consequently the defendant was not entitled to recover on the counter-claim.

=== Court of Appeal ===
Lord Collins MR, Romer LJ and Mathew LJ held that Mr Chandler was not entitled to recover his damages before the procession became impossible.

== Reform ==
The Law Reform (Frustrated Contracts) Act 1943 provided, among other things, that monies provided in advance of performance of a contract are recoverable in the event of performance being frustrated.

== See also ==
- Frustration in English law
- Fibrosa Spolka Akcyjna v Fairbairn Lawson Combe Barbour Ltd [1943] AC 32
- Krell v Henry
- Herne Bay Steamboat Co v Hutton
