= Accord and satisfaction =

Concept in contract law

Accord and satisfaction is a contract law concept about the purchase of the release from a debt obligation. It is one of the methods by which parties to a contract may terminate their agreement. The release is completed by the transfer of valuable consideration that must not be the actual performance of the obligation itself. The accord is the agreement to discharge the obligation and the satisfaction is the legal "consideration" which binds the parties to the agreement. A valid accord does not discharge the prior contract; instead it suspends the right to enforce it in accordance with the terms of the accord contract, in which satisfaction, or performance of the contract will discharge both contracts (the original and the accord). If the creditor breaches the accord, then the debtor will be able to bring up the existence of the accord in order to enjoin any action against him.

If a person is sued over an alleged debt, that person bears the burden of proving the affirmative defense of accord and satisfaction.

== Illustration ==
Accord and satisfaction is a settlement of an unliquidated debt. For example, a builder is contracted to build a homeowner a garage for $35,000. The contract called for $17,500 prior to starting construction, to disburse $10,000 during various stages of construction, and to make a final payment of $7,500 at completion. At completion, the homeowner complained about inferior work quality and refused to make the final payment. After a mutual settlement agreement, the builder accepted $4,000 as full payment. Thereby, a new contract was formed by offer, acceptance, and consideration. The consideration is that for a $3,500 savings, the homeowner gives up that which he is entitled, a well-constructed garage. The builder gives up his right to full price to avoid suit for inferior performance. When accord and satisfaction has occurred, the homeowner has given up his right to sue for inferior performance, and the builder has given up his right to sue for the full $7,500 due under the original contract.

Another example would be where a lender agrees to lend $100,000 at 5.0% interest for 30 years, and at the closing the loan documents are all drawn up for a loan with a 6.0% interest rate. If the lender agrees to reduce the closing costs by an extra $1000 and the borrowers agree, then there has been an accord and satisfaction. If the borrowers later sue for breach of contract, the settlement (offer and acceptance of the $1000) constitutes an accord and satisfaction and is a valid defense to the borrower's lawsuit.

The accord agreement must be transacted on a new agreement. It must therefore have the essential terms of a contract, (parties, subject matter, time for performance, and consideration). If there is a breach of the accord there will be no "satisfaction" which will give rise to a breach of accord. In this instance the non-offending party has the right to sue under either the original contract or the accord agreement.

== Consideration ==
In an accord contract it is typical (though not legally necessary) that the consideration supplied is less than bargained for in the original contract. Some accord contracts also substitute payment in cash for payment in kind (e.g. rather than paying a cash sum, the debtor gives the creditor something of value, such as a car, boat, real estate, stocks, etc.)

== See also ==
- Foakes v Beer - an old leading case on the exception of accord and satisfaction where the debt was not in dispute
- D & C Builders Ltd v Rees - where the creditor accepted the offer under duress
- Pinnel's Case - where the payment of a lesser amount was to be paid before the debt fell due
- Hirachand Punumchand v Temple - where the offeree was a 3rd party (the debtor's father)
- Part performance - related legal concept
- Jacob & Young, Inc. v. Kent, 230 N.Y. 239, (N.Y. App. 1921).
- HBF Dalgety Ltd v Morton, an unsuccessful attempt to invoke accord and satisfaction
