= Herne Bay Steamboat Co v Hutton =

- Court: Court of Appeal
- Citation: [1903] 2 KB 683

Keywords
- Frustration

Herne Bay Steamboat Co v Hutton [1903] 2 KB 683 is a case on the subject of frustration of purpose. It is one of a group of cases arising out of the same event, known as the coronation cases.

== Facts ==
The defendant, Mr Hutton, contracted to hire a steamship, named Cynthia, on 28 and 29 June 1902. This was following a public announcement that a Royal naval review was to take place at Spithead on that day. The contract was "for the purpose of viewing the naval review and for a day's cruise round the fleet". Following the cancellation of the coronation, and of the naval review, the defendants refused payment, stating the contract was frustrated in purpose.

== Judgment ==
Whilst at first instance the defendant succeeded in this argument, it was reversed by the Court of Appeal, who deemed the contract was not frustrated, and the balance in full was due to the plaintiff. At first this may seem contradictory to Krell v Henry. However, it can be explained by reference to the agreement the parties reached; the hiring was not merely to witness the naval review, but also for a cruise around the fleet. This purpose was still entirely possible, as explained by Stirling LJ:

It is said that, by reason of the reference in the contract to the "naval review", the existence of the review formed the basis of the contract, and that as the review failed to take place the parties became discharged from the further performance of the contract, in accordance with the doctrine of Taylor v Caldwell. I am unable to arrive at that conclusion. It seems to me that the reference in the contract to the naval review is easily explained; it was inserted in order to define more exactly the nature of the voyage, and I am unable to treat it as being such a reference as to constitute the naval review the foundation of the contract so as to entitle either party to the benefit of the doctrine in Taylor v. Caldwell. I come to this conclusion the more readily because the object of the voyage is not limited to the naval review, but also extends to a cruise round the fleet. The fleet was there, and passengers might have been found willing to go round it. It is true that in the event which happened the object of the voyage became limited, but, in my opinion, that was the risk of the defendant whose venture the taking the passengers was.

It has also been suggested that the different attitudes of the court in both cases partially stemmed from the fact that Hutton was acting in a purely personal capacity, whereas Henry was acting in a business capacity.

== See also ==
- Krell v Henry
- Chandler v Webster
- Frustration in English law
