= Roland Vaughan Williams =

English lawyer and judge

The Right Honourable Sir Roland Vaughan Williams
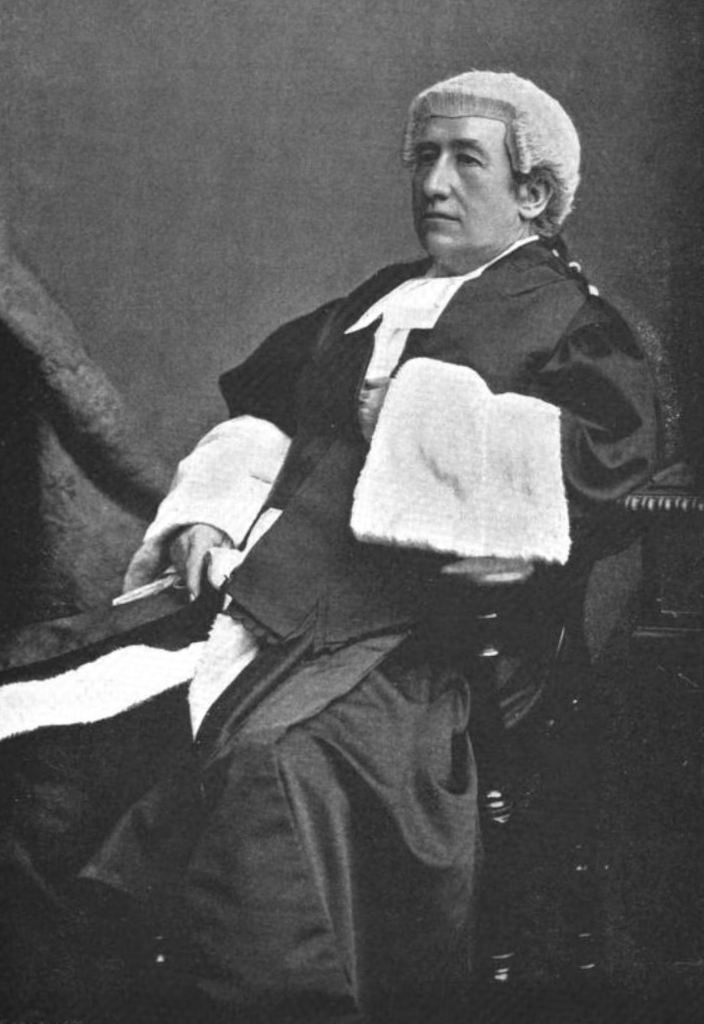
- In The Sketch, 5 August 1896

Lord Justice of Appeal
- In office 1897–1914

Justice of the High Court
- In office 1890–1897

Personal details
- Born: Roland Bowdler Vaughan Williams; 31 December 1838 Bloomsbury, London
- Died: 8 December 1916 (aged 77) Abinger, Surrey
- Spouse: Laura Susannah Lomax
- Children: 3
- Relatives: Edward Vaughan Williams (father); Ralph Vaughan Williams (nephew)
- Education: Westminster School
- Alma mater: Christ Church, Oxford

Sir Roland Bowdler Lomax Vaughan Williams (31 December 1838 – 8 December 1916) was an English lawyer and judge. From 1897 to 1914 he was a Lord Justice of the Court of Appeal. He was an authority on the laws of bankruptcy, and wrote a book that remained the standard English work on the subject for many years.

== Life and career ==
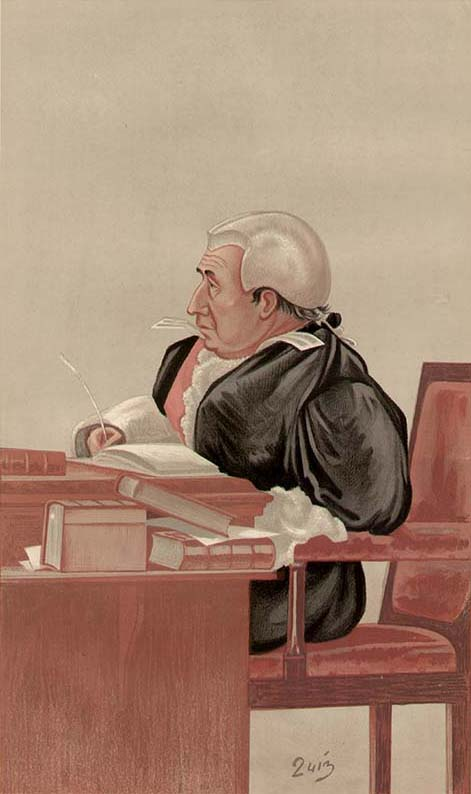
Caricature in Vanity Fair

Vaughan Williams was born in Kensington, London, the fifth son of the judge Sir Edward Vaughan Williams and his wife, Jane Margaret, née Bagot. Among his brothers was Arthur, who became a clergyman and was the father of the composer Ralph Vaughan Williams. He was educated at the Westminster School and Christ Church, Oxford, graduating in the year 1860.

Vaughan Williams was called to the bar in 1861 and was a barrister of Lincoln's Inn. In 1870 he published The Law and Practice of Bankruptcy, a work that was for many years the standard English authority on the subject. He became a Queen's Counsel in 1889.

The following year he was raised to the bench as a Judge of the Queen's Bench Division, from which he was promoted to be a Lord Justice of the Court of Appeal in 1897; he was appointed to the Privy Council at the same time. In 1906 he was appointed chairman of the Royal Commission on the disestablishment of the Church in Wales; the success of the commission and the smooth implementation of its recommendations were largely attributable to him.

Vaughan Williams' conduct in the Court of Appeal was said to have driven a fellow Lord Justice, Sir Robert Romer, into retirement.

In 1865 he married Laura Susannah, daughter of Edmund Lomax of Surrey after which he added her surname to his own. They had one son who survived to adulthood and two who did not.

Vaughan Williams died at his home in Abinger, Surrey, at the age of 77.

== Notable cases ==
=== High Court ===
- Re Anglo-Austrian Printing & Publishing Union [1895] 2 Ch 891, concerning recovery of assets under a misfeasance action

=== Court of Appeal ===
- Re Peveril Gold Mines Ltd [1898] 1 Ch 122, regarding the power of a shareholder to wind-up an insolvent company
- Allen v Gold Reefs of West Africa Ltd [1900] 1 Ch 656 (dissenting), on amendments to the articles of association which were not in the interests of the company as a whole
- Krell v Henry [1903] 2 KB 740, one of the "Coronation cases" relating to frustration of purpose under contract law
- Re Yorkshire Woolcombers Association Ltd [1903] 2 Ch 295, arguably his most famous judicial contribution, formulating the description of a floating charge
- Re Atkinson [1904] 2 Ch 160, on apportioning entitlements between a life tenant and remainderman in a trust
- Hirachand Punumchand v Temple [1911] 2 KB 330, relating to part payment of debts
- Chaplin v Hicks [1911] 2 KB 786, on damages for loss of chance
