= Re Peveril Gold Mines Ltd =

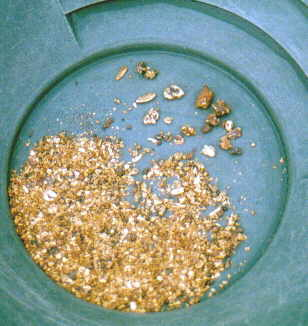
- Court: Court of Appeal
- Citation: [1898] 1 Ch 122

Court membership
- Judges sitting: Lord Lindley MR; Chitty LJ; Vaughan Williams LJ

Case opinions
- Lord Lindley MR

Keywords
- Liquidation

Re Peveril Gold Mines Ltd [1898] 1 Ch 122 is a UK insolvency law case concerning liquidation when a company is unable to repay its debts. It held that a member cannot be prevented by a company constitution from bringing a winding up petition. It is, however, possible for a member to make a shareholder agreement and thus contract out of the right to bring a winding up petition outside of the company.

== Facts ==
The articles of association of Peveril Gold Mines Ltd said no member should petition for winding up unless two directors had consented or the general meeting had resolved or a petitioner held at least 20% of issued capital. A member asked for winding up without satisfying any of these conditions.

== Judgment ==
Lord Lindley MR held that the member was entitled to do so. He said ‘these registered limited companies are incorporated on certain conditions; they continue to exist on certain conditions; and they are liable to be dissolved on certain conditions.’ He pointed to the predecessors of Insolvency Act 1986 sections 122 and sections 124 and said they set out circumstance when a company can be dissolved by the court and who can petition. A member could not be restricted.

I will begin by reading the following passage from the speech of Lord Macnaghten in Welton v Saffery [1897] AC 324: “These companies are the creature of statute, and by the statute to which they owe their being they must be bound in regard to shareholders as well as in regard to creditors in all matters coming within the conditions of the memorandum of association. Shareholders in these companies require protection just as much as creditors—perhaps even more; shareholders are not partners for all purposes; they have not all the rights of partners; they have practically no voice in the management of the concern. Their security in a great measure depends on the directors adhering to the requirements of the Act.” Any one who is familiar with the Companies Acts knows perfectly well that these registered limited companies are incorporated on certain conditions; they continue to exist on certain conditions; and they are liable to be dissolved on certain conditions. The important sections of the Act of 1862, with regard to dissolution, are ss. 79 and 82. Sect. 79 states the circumstances under which such a company may be dissolved by the Court, and s. 82 states the persons who may petition for a dissolution. Any article contrary to these sections—any article which says that the company is formed on the condition that its life shall not be terminated when any of the circumstances mentioned in s. 79 exist, or which limits the right of a contributory under s. 82 to petition for a winding-up, would be an attempt to enforce on all the shareholders that which is at variance with the statutory conditions, and is invalid. It is no answer to say that the right to petition may be waived by any contributory personally. I do not intend to decide whether a valid contract may or may not be made between the company and an individual shareholder that he shall not petition for the winding up of the company. That point does not arise now. But to say that a company is formed on the condition that its existence shall not be terminated under the circumstances, or on the application of the persons, mentioned in the Act is to say that it is formed contrary to the provisions of the Act, and upon conditions which the Court is bound to ignore. The view taken by Byrne J. was right, and the appeal must be dismissed.

Chitty LJ and Vaughan Williams LJ concurred.

== See also ==
- UK insolvency law
