= BP Exploration Co (Libya) Ltd v Hunt (No 2) =

BP Exploration Co (Libya) v Hunt (No 2)
- Court: House of Lords
- Decided: 4 February 1982
- Citation: [1983] 2 AC 352
- Transcript: judgment

Case history
- Prior action: [1983] 1 WLR 232, [1982] 1 All ER 925 (Court of Appeal) [1979] 1 WLR 783 (High Court)

Court membership
- Judges sitting: Lord Wilberforce, Lord Diplock, Lord Keith of Kinkel, Lord Scarman, Lord Brandon of Oakbrook

Keywords
- Frustration, Law Reform (Frustrated Contracts) Act 1943

BP Exploration Co (Libya) v Hunt (No 2) [1983] 2 AC 352 is an English contract and unjust enrichment case, concerning the frustration of an agreement.

== Facts ==
In 1957 Nelson Bunker Hunt obtained an oil concession for the Sarir field in Libya. In 1960, he contracted with BP to exploit the oil. The contract said (1) Hunt would transfer BP half the concession (2) BP would transfer Hunt 'farm in' contributions in cash and oil (3) BP would explore for and develop the oil (4) BP provided all funds until the oil was found, and (5) the profits would be shared, but 3/8 of Hunt's share would go to BP until 125% of the farm in contributions and half the costs of BP were covered. A massive oil reserve was found in 1967. However, in 1971, 2 years after the Libyan government was overthrown and replaced by Muammar Gaddafi, it nationalised BP's half share. BP had already covered half its costs. Two years later in 1973, the Libyan government also expropriated Hunt from his share. BP claimed the contract was frustrated, and claimed for a just sum of money to be awarded under the Law Reform (Frustrated Contracts) Act 1943, section 1(3).

== Judgment ==
=== High Court ===
Robert Goff J held the contract was frustrated in 1971 and under the Law Reform (Frustrated Contracts) Act 1943, section 1(3) awarded BP $35.4m plus interest. He held there are two steps in a section 1(3) claim. First, identify the value of the benefit, which could be the value of the services performed or the end product of the services. Regard can be had to the value of services when no end product results or where the end product has no objective value, but where the end product is destroyed by fire, there is no claim under section 1(3) because the value has been reduced to zero by the frustrating event. The effect, therefore, was to lead to the same result as in Appleby. The second step is to assess what is a ‘just sum’. Robert Goff J said it was the sum that would lead to ‘the prevention of the unjust enrichment of the defendant at the plaintiff’s expense’

Money has the peculiar character of a universal medium of exchange. By its receipt, the recipient is inevitably benefited; and (subject to problems arising from such matters as inflation, change of position and the time value of money) the loss suffered by the plaintiff is generally equal to the defendant’s gain, so that no difficulty arises concerning the amount to be repaid. The same cannot be said of other benefits, such as goods or services... ...the basic measure of recovery in restitution is the reasonable value of the plaintiff’s performance – in a case of services, a quantum meruit or reasonable remuneration, and in a case of goods, a quantum valebat or reasonable price. Such cases are to be contrasted with cases where such a benefit has not been requested by the defendant. In the latter class of case, recovery is rare in restitution; but if the sole basis of recovery was that the defendant had been incontrovertibly benefited, it might be legitimate to limit recovery to the defendant’s actual benefit...

=== Court of Appeal ===
The Court of Appeal upheld the decision of Robert Goff J. Lawton LJ said that judges under the Act have complete discretion to award what they think is fair, and found he got 'no help from the use of words which are not in the statute', such as "unjust enrichment".

=== House of Lords ===
A more limited appeal on the wording of section 2(3) was dismissed.

== See also ==
- English contract law
- Frustration in English law
