= Coronation of Edward VII and Alexandra =

1902 coronation in the United Kingdom

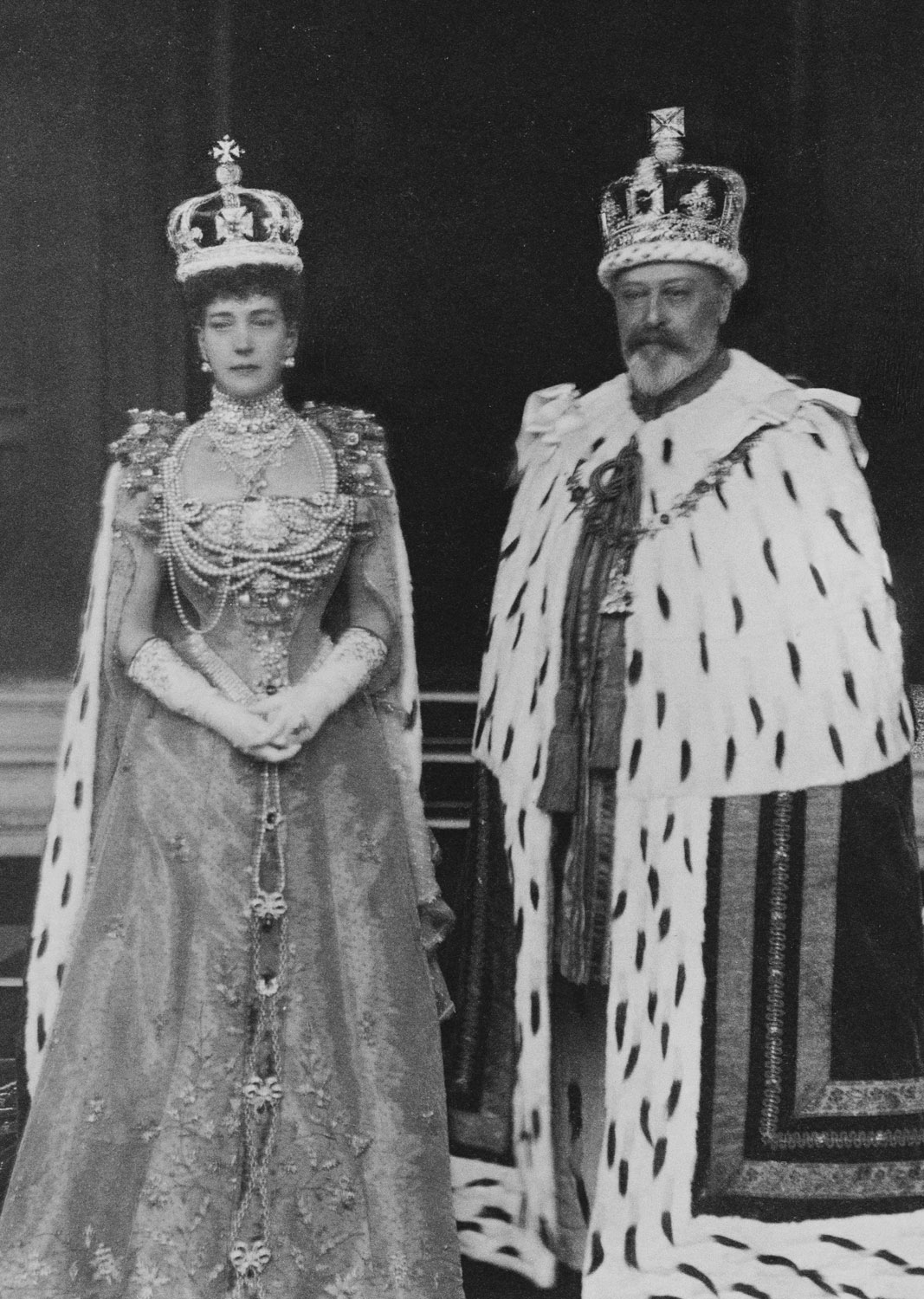
- The King and Queen in their coronation robes
- Date: 9 August 1902; 123 years ago
- Location: Westminster Abbey, London, England
- Participants: King Edward VII; Queen Alexandra; Great Officers of State; Archbishops and Bishops Assistant of the Church of England; Garter Principal King of Arms; Peers of the Realm; Mistress of the Robes

The coronation of Edward VII and his wife, Alexandra, as king and queen of the United Kingdom and the British Dominions took place at Westminster Abbey, London, on 9 August 1902. Originally scheduled for 26 June of that year, the ceremony had been postponed at very short notice, because the King had been taken ill with an abdominal abscess that required immediate surgery. In contrast to the coronation of Queen Victoria, Edward's mother and predecessor, some 64 years earlier, Edward and Alexandra's coronation had been carefully planned as a spectacle reflecting the influence and culture of the British Empire, then at the height of its power, but also as a meaningful religious occasion.

== Preparations ==
The 1838 coronation of Queen Victoria, Edward VII's mother and predecessor, had been an unrehearsed and somewhat lacklustre event in the Abbey, though the newly extended street procession and celebrations around the country had been a great success. Victoria's Golden and Diamond Jubilees had created the expectation that Edward's coronation equally would be an expression of the nation's status as a great imperial power. In December 1901, an Executive Coronation Committee was formed, whose leading member, Viscount Esher, worked closely with the King to set the agenda for the event. Esher had been responsible for organising the Diamond Jubilee in 1897 and was one of the driving forces behind the renewed enthusiasm for royal ceremonial. The position of Director of Music was given to Sir Frederick Bridge, the organist and choirmaster at Westminster Abbey; the first Abbey organist since Henry Purcell to be given that role. Bridge had successfully transformed the quality of music at the Abbey and had directed the music at the Golden Jubilee, for which he had been made a Member of the Royal Victorian Order.

Lady Curzon, wife of Lord Curzon of Kedleston, Viceroy of India, contributed the design of the Queen's coronation gown. Alexandra had personally asked Curzon to help her with the design in July 1901. Curzon was given a free hand to decide on the gown's design, with Alexandra stipulating only that the motifs should include the floral emblems of England, Scotland, and Ireland, being the English Tudor rose, the Scots' thistle, and the Irish shamrock. As Alexandra was to wear a heavy velvet and ermine mantle, it was decided that the gown itself should be made of lightweight gold net with metallic embroidery, the Zari of India of which Lady Curzon was an admirer. Parisian fashion house Morin Blossier designed the gown, sewn with thousands of tiny gold spangles. Forty needle-workers in Delhi spent five months embroidering the gown's gold net, before it was sent to Paris to be laid over cloth of gold and made into the final gown. A gown made of the same material, and bearing motifs relevant to India, was made for Lady Curzon (whose husband was Viceroy of India at the time) to wear at the event held in Delhi to mark the coronation. Work on stitching Queen Alexandra's gown began in October 1901 and finished in February 1902, with final alterations made by the House of Worth of Paris.

== Illness and postponement ==
By the time of his accession, the 59-year-old Edward was overweight and fond of large meals and cigars. He launched himself into his new role, but his first busy months on the throne were bedevilled by a succession of illnesses and injuries. On 23 June 1902, three days before the date set for the coronation, Edward and his wife, Alexandra, returned from Windsor Castle to Buckingham Palace in preparation. Foreign journalists noted that he appeared "worn and pale" and was leaning heavily on his cane. That evening, the King and Queen hosted a formal dinner for seventy British and overseas royal guests.

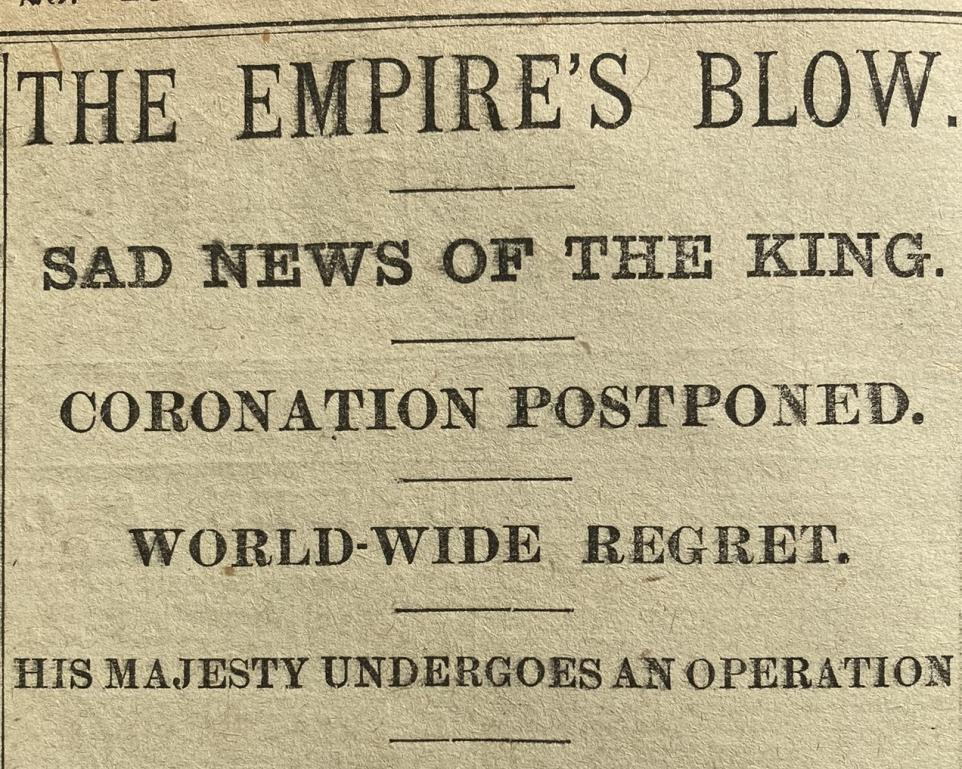
Headline in The Northern Echo of 25 June 1902, announcing the postponement of the coronation.

The following day at noon, a telegram marked "OFFICIAL" was dispatched around the Empire, with the news that the coronation was postponed and that the King was undergoing an operation. Shortly afterward, a bulletin was released from Edward's medical team, stating that "The King is suffering from perityphlitis. The condition on Saturday was so satisfactory that it was hoped that with care His Majesty would be able to go through the Coronation ceremonies. On Monday evening a recrudescence became manifest, rendering a surgical operation necessary today". It was undersigned by, among others, Lord Lister and Sir Frederick Treves, who actually carried out the operation on a table in the Music Room at Buckingham Palace, to drain his abdominal cyst.

On 26 June itself, a "solemn service of intercession" was held at St Paul's Cathedral, which was attended by many of the British and foreign dignitaries who were in London for the coronation. Although workmen immediately received instructions to begin dismantling the wooden stands that had been erected along the route of the procession, Edward was insistent that regional celebrations and a planned "Coronation Dinner for the Poor of London" should go ahead. Organised by Sir Thomas Lipton, 500,000 dinners were served to Londoners on 5 July at 800 locations around the capital. The King personally contributed £30,000 toward the cost and there were donations by commercial companies and wealthy individuals. The confectionery maker Rowntree's provided each diner with a tin of chocolate and a rather better one for the 60,000 people who had acted as stewards on the grounds that they would "be of greater influence socially than the poor".

Many people had intended to watch the coronation procession, and rooms along the planned route had been rented out at high rates for the expected day of the coronation. The postponement of the coronation led to many demands for refunds on the rental contracts, resulting in the "Coronation cases", which set an important precedent in the doctrine of frustration of purpose in the English common law of contract. Edward also wrote a letter addressed to his people which was published on the eve of the coronation by the press.

== The service ==
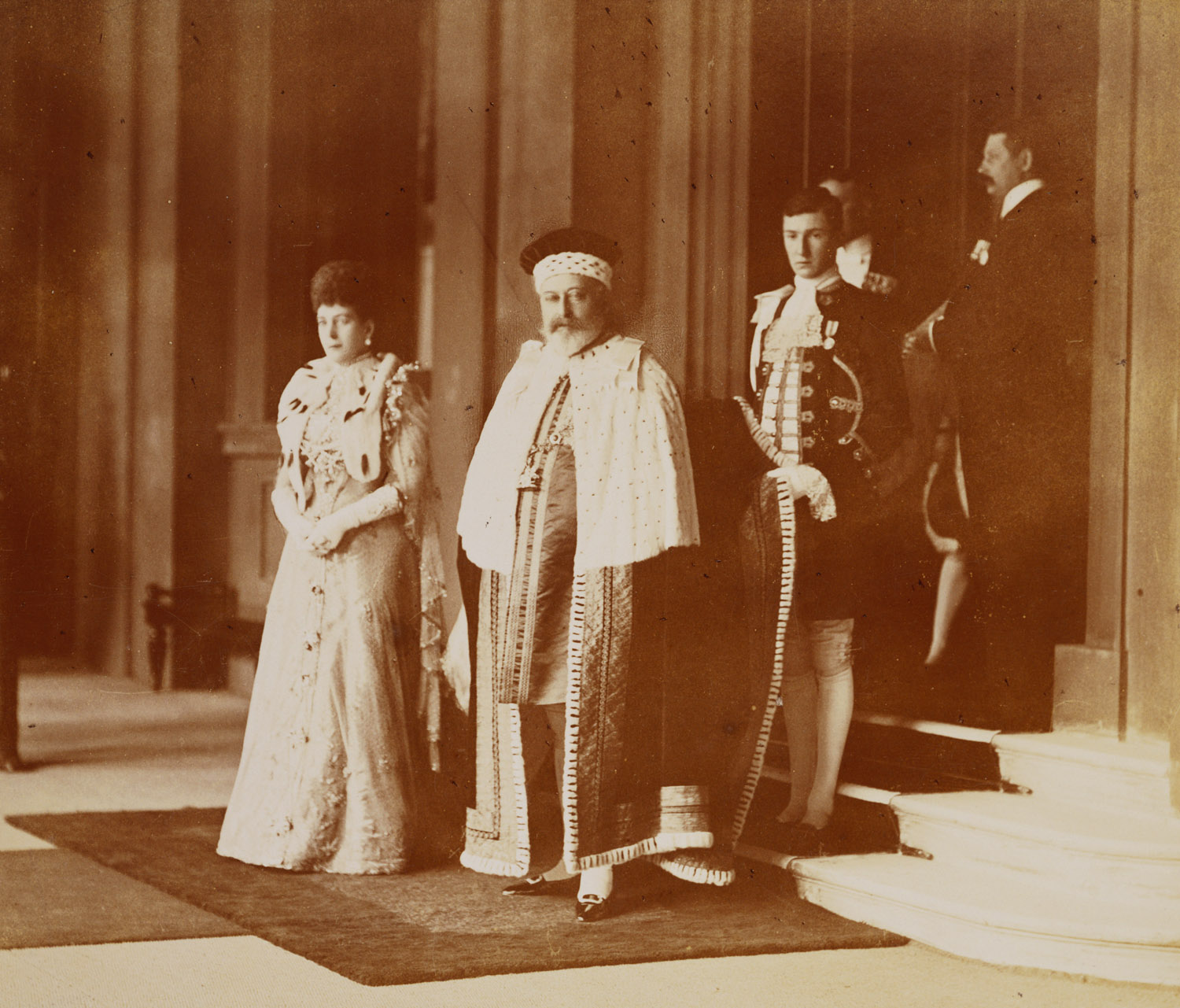
The King and Queen leaving for their coronation from Buckingham Palace

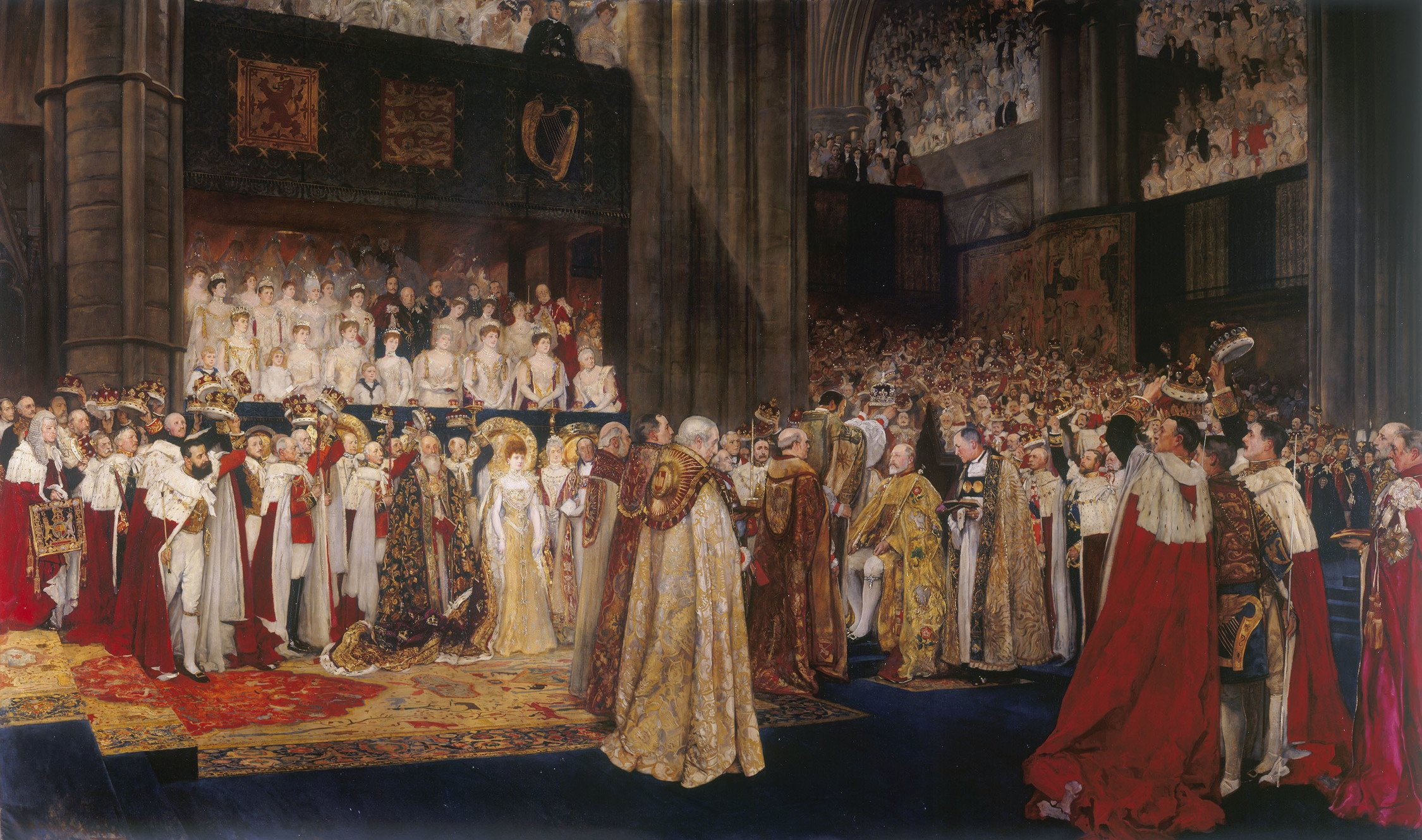
The moment of crowning in the coronation service; painting by Edwin Austin Abbey

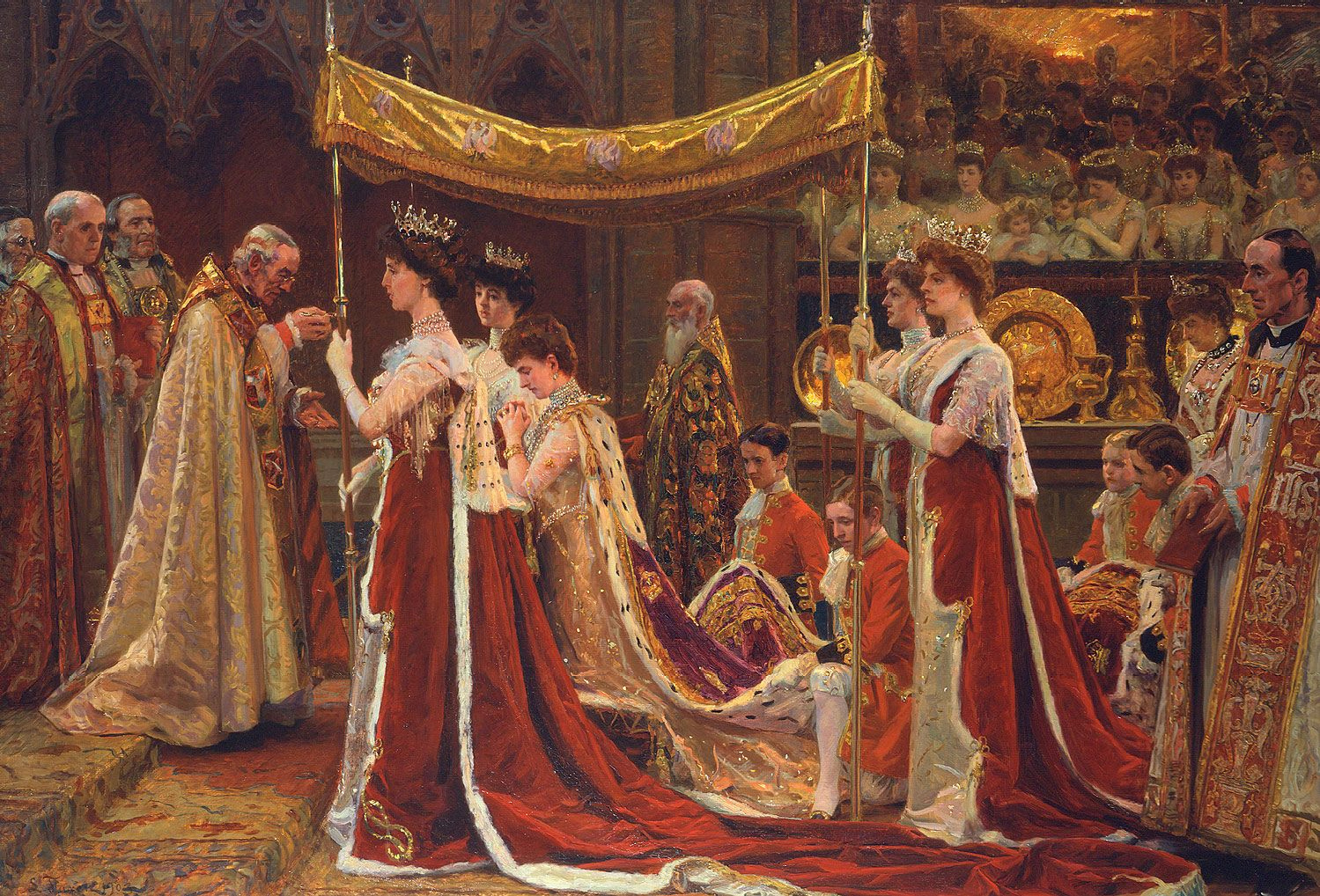
The anointing of Queen Alexandra; painting by Laurits Tuxen

One effect of the postponement was the departure of the foreign delegations, which did not return for the rescheduled ceremony, leaving their countries to be represented by their ambassadors. This made the coronation "a domestic celebration of the British race united by the influence of the Imperial Crown" according to J. E. C. Bodley, the official historian of the event. Among the 8,000 guests at the Abbey were the prime ministers of the British Dominions, thirty-one rulers of the Indian princely states, the Sultan of Perak and the Litunga of Barotseland. The Times enthused that "King Edward is the first of our kings to be attended in his Coronation by an illustrious group of statesmen from our self-governing colonies, as he is the first to be accompanied by a number of the great feudatory Princes of India... They are bound to preserve the fabric of British polity and of British civilisation."

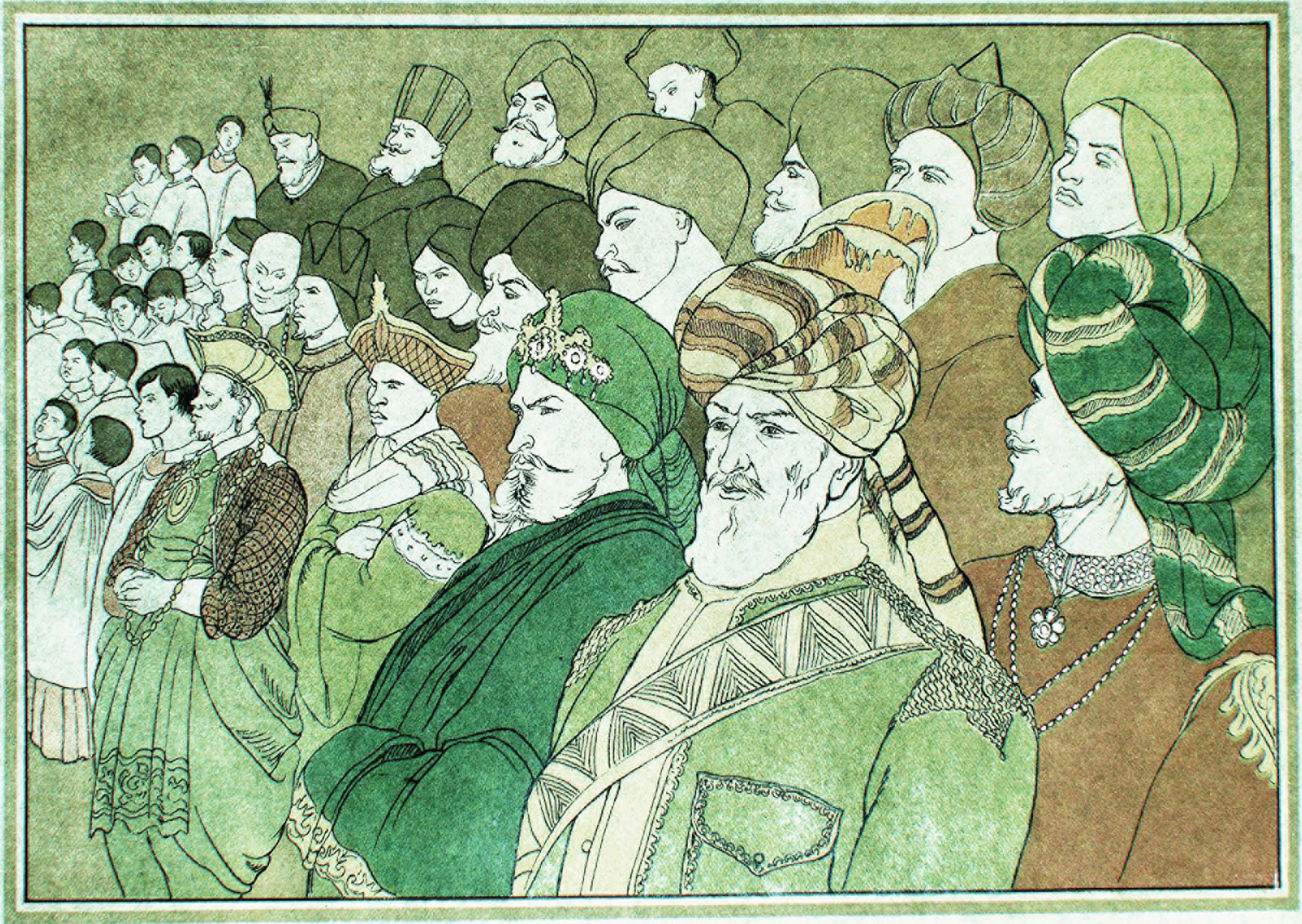
An impression by Edith Harwood (1866–1926) of the colonial princes at Edward's coronation, from The Masque of the Edwards of England published in 1902

The contents of the service itself had been carefully selected to ensure that its spiritual character was maintained, while keeping the ceremony as brief as possible. The draft was mainly the work of Randall Davidson, the Bishop of Winchester.

The service was conducted by the elderly and infirm Archbishop of Canterbury, Frederick Temple, who died before the end of the year. He steadfastly refused to delegate any part of his duties and had to be supported throughout by two other bishops. Because of his failing eyesight, the text of the service had to be printed in gigantic type onto rolls of paper called "prompt scrolls"; they are preserved in the Lambeth Palace Library. Archbishop Temple provided most of the upsets in an otherwise splendid ceremony; he was unable to rise after kneeling to pay homage and had to be helped up by the King himself and several bishops, he placed the crown back-to-front on the King's head, and when a colleague enquired after his well-being, he was told to "go away!" in a loud voice that was plainly heard by the congregation. The King also deviated from the order of service; when the Prince of Wales touched the Crown and kissed his father's left cheek in the traditional gesture of homage, the King rose to his feet and threw his arms around his son's neck in an unusual display of affection. Another disruption came from the King's sister, Princess Beatrice, who accidentally (but noisily) dropped her service book from the royal gallery onto a gold-plate table.

Because he was still convalescing, Edward had been crowned with the Imperial State Crown instead of the heavier St Edward's Crown. Alexandra was crowned immediately after her husband by William Dalrymple Maclagan, Archbishop of York, with a new crown containing the Koh-i-Noor diamond.

=== Music ===
On receiving his commission as Director of Music, it was made clear to Frederick Bridge that the coronation needed music of sufficient majesty and grandeur to make the event unparalleled in history. He was assisted by Sir Walter Parratt, the Master of the King's Music, who had the influence at court that Bridge lacked. Bridge decided to make the coronation a celebration of four hundred years of English music. Settings of the coronation texts composed by Thomas Tallis, Orlando Gibbons and Henry Purcell were included alongside works by contemporary composers such as Arthur Sullivan, Charles Villiers Stanford and John Stainer. New work commissioned for the occasion famously included Hubert Parry's setting of Psalm 122, I was glad which skilfully incorporated the traditional acclamation of "Vivat Rex" by the King's Scholars of Westminster School on the entrance of the sovereign. It has been used at all coronations since. French composer Camille Saint-Saëns was also commissioned to write a work for the occasion, his Marche du Couronnement, opus 117, which, together with pieces by Tchaikovsky, Wagner and Gounod, was played as introductory music before the arrival of the king and was the only music by foreign composers.

The music was performed by a choir of 430, a 65-piece orchestra and 10 State Trumpeters. At the 1838 coronation, the organist had attempted to play the instrument and conduct at the same time, with the result that neither function was satisfactory. Bridge not only delegated the organ to Walter Alcock, but also used two sub-conductors, and furthermore alternated with Parratt in conducting from the top of the organ screen. The only real musical error was that Bridge misjudged the timing of I Was Glad and had finished the anthem before the King had arrived, having to repeat it when the right moment came. Bridge was saved by the organist, who improvised in the interim.

== Coronation cases ==
The postponement of the coronation also led to litigation in the form of the Coronation cases. The Coronation cases were a group of appellate opinions in English law cases, all arising out of contracts that had been made for accommodation for viewing the celebrations surrounding the coronation originally scheduled for 26 June 1902. Many owners of buildings along the coronation procession route had rented their front rooms to others who hoped to guarantee themselves a view of the procession, or rented out boats from which to watch the associated naval review. When the planned coronation was postponed until 9 August, the renters were not inclined to pay top prices—or pay at all—for rooms on an ordinary day (26 June).

In general, the contracts were voided on the ground of frustration of purpose. Certain contracts which did not mention that the purpose was to view the coronation festivities were upheld.

== Procession ==
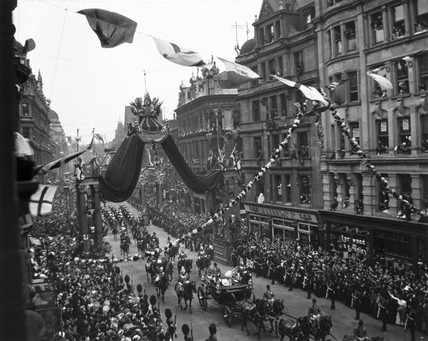
The Procession in State passes through the London streets

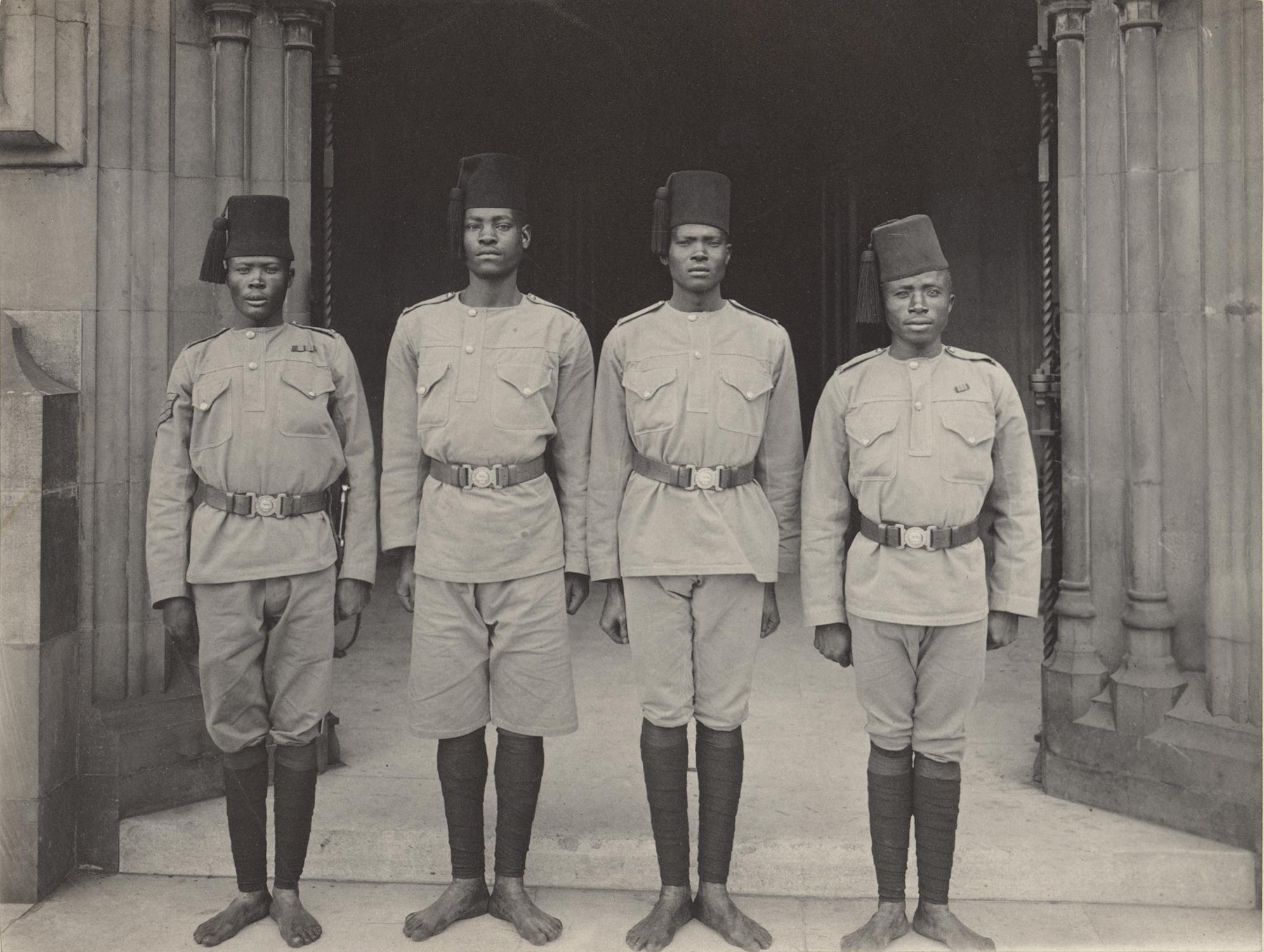
A contingent of the King's African Rifles, photographed by John Benjamin Stone

The Procession in State was originally to have included military contingents from Germany, Austria-Hungary, Denmark, Russia and Portugal. However, following the postponement, these returned home, leaving the parade a wholly British and Imperial affair. Out of a total of 30,000 men marching or lining the route, over 2,000 were representatives of colonial, Dominion or Indian forces. The remainder represented every corps and regiment of the British Army, the Royal Navy and the Royal Marines. A procession of carriages carried British and overseas dignitaries and was followed by the King's equerries, aides-de-camp and eminent commanders including Lord Kitchener, Lord Roberts and Lord Wolseley.

The route of the procession, watched by a crowd estimated at one million, went from Parliament Square along Whitehall to Trafalgar Square, then along Pall Mall, St James's Street and Piccadilly to Hyde Park Corner, and finally down Constitution Hill. On their return to Buckingham Palace, the King and Queen appeared on the balcony to greet the crowds, which set a precedent for later coronations.

A second procession, which had been planned for the day after the coronation service to tour the City of London and Southwark, was postponed until 25 October because of the King's health.

== Coronation Review of the Fleet ==
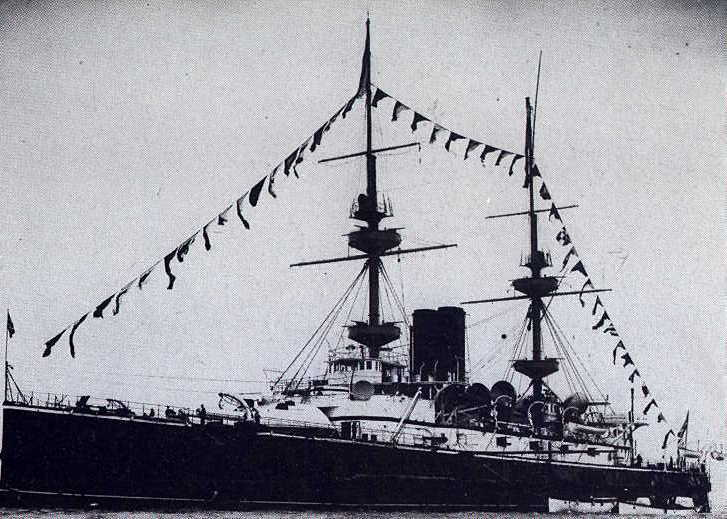
The battleship HMS Mars dressed overall at the Coronation Fleet Review

Aside from the postponed procession, the final coronation event was the Review of the Fleet on 16 August at Spithead off the coast at Portsmouth. Without bringing a single warship back from any overseas station, the Royal Navy was able to muster 20 battleships, 24 cruisers and 47 destroyers. A number of foreign warships were invited to participate. An estimated crowd of 100,000 watched from the shore or from pleasure steamers and small boats at sea. Although there had been no less than seventeen fleet reviews during Victoria's reign, this was the first to be associated with a coronation.

On the morning of the review, the King had an audience aboard the royal yacht with three Boer commanders; Louis Botha, Christiaan de Wet and Koos de la Rey. This is remarkable because the Treaty of Vereeniging ending the bitterly fought Second Boer War had only been concluded on 31 May that year. On the following day, the King was well enough to watch fleet exercises at sea.

== Royal guests ==
=== British royal family ===
- The Prince and Princess of Wales, the King and Queen's son and daughter-in-law
  - Prince Edward of Wales, the King and Queen's grandson
  - Prince Albert of Wales, the King and Queen's grandson
- The Princess Louise, Duchess of Fife and the Duke of Fife, the King and Queen's daughter and son-in-law
  - Lady Alexandra Duff, the King and Queen's granddaughter
- The Princess Victoria, the King and Queen's daughter
- Princess and Prince Charles of Denmark, the King and Queen's daughter and son-in-law
- Grand Duchess Alice of Hesse and by Rhine's family:
  - Princess Louis of Battenberg, the King's niece
    - Princess Alice of Battenberg, the King's great-niece
- The Prince Alfred, Duke of Saxe-Coburg and Gotha's family:
  - (Kingdom of Romania) The Crown Princess and Crown Prince of Romania, the King's niece and nephew-in-law (also second cousin once removed) (representing his uncle, the King of the Romanians)
  - Princess Beatrice of Saxe-Coburg and Gotha, the King's niece
- Princess and Prince Christian of Schleswig-Holstein, the King's sister and brother-in-law
  - Prince Albert of Schleswig-Holstein, the King's nephew
  - Princess Helena Victoria of Schleswig-Holstein, the king's niece
  - Princess Marie Louise of Schleswig-Holstein, the king's niece
- The Princess Louise, Duchess of Argyll and the Duke of Argyll, the King's sister and brother-in-law
- The Duke and Duchess of Connaught and Strathearn, the King's brother and sister-in-law
  - Princess Margaret of Connaught, the King's niece
  - Prince Arthur of Connaught, the king's nephew
  - Princess Patricia of Connaught, the king's niece
- The Duchess of Albany, the King's sister-in-law
  - Princess Alice of Albany, the King's niece
  - The Duke of Saxe-Coburg and Gotha (Duke of Albany), the King's nephew
- Princess Henry of Battenberg, the King's sister
  - Prince Alexander of Battenberg, the King's nephew
  - Princess Victoria Eugenie of Battenberg, the King's niece
  - Prince Leopold of Battenberg, the King's nephew
  - Prince Maurice of Battenberg, the King's nephew
- Princess Victor of Hohenlohe-Langenburg, widow of the King's half-first cousin
  - Countess Feodora Gleichen,the King's half-first cousin once removed
  - Count Edward Gleichen, the King's half-first cousin once removed
  - Countess Valda Gleichen, the King's half-first cousin once removed
  - Countess Helena Gleichen, the King's half-first cousin once removed

Other descendants of the King's maternal great-grandfather King George III and their families:

- Princess Frederica of Hanover and Baron Alphons von Pawel-Rammingen, the King's second cousin and her husband
- The Duke of Cambridge, the King's first cousin once removed
  - Adolphus FitzGeorge, the King's second cousin
  - Augustus FitzGeorge, the King's second cousin
- (Grand Duchy of Mecklenburg-Strelitz) The Grand Duchess of Mecklenburg-Strelitz, the King's first cousin once removed
  - (Grand Duchy of Mecklenburg-Strelitz) Duke Adolphus Frederick of Mecklenburg-Strelitz, the king's second cousin once removed (representing his grandfather, the Grand Duke of Mecklenburg-Strelitz)
- The Duke and Duchess of Teck, the King's second cousin and his wife
- Prince Francis of Teck, the King's second cousin
- Prince Alexander of Teck, the King's second cousin
- The Earl of Munster, the King's second cousin once removed

=== Foreign royals ===
- (Grand Duchy of Hesse) The Grand Duke of Hesse and by Rhine, the King's nephew
- (Kingdom of Prussia) Prince and Princess Henry of Prussia, the King's nephew and niece (representing his brother, the German Emperor)
- The Crown Prince of Denmark, the Queen's brother (representing his father, the King of Denmark)
- (Kingdom of Greece) The Duke and Duchess of Sparta, the Queen's nephew and the King's niece (representing his father, the King of the Hellenes)
- (Kingdom of Greece) Prince George of Greece and Denmark, the Queen's nephew
- (Kingdom of Greece) Prince Andrew of Greece and Denmark, the Queen's nephew
- The Prince of Leiningen, the King's half-first cousin
- Albert von Mensdorff-Pouilly-Dietrichstein, the king's second cousin
- (Ethiopian Empire) Ras Makonnen Wolde Mikael (representing his cousin, the Emperor of Ethiopia)
- Prince and Princess Edward of Saxe-Weimar (representing his cousin, the Grand Duke of Saxe-Weimar-Eisenach)
- (Russian Empire) Grand Duke Michael Mikhailovich of Russia and Countess de Torby
- The Maharaja of Kolhapur
- The Maharaja of Bikaner
- The Maharaja of Cooch Behar
- The Maharaja of Idar
- The Maharaja of Gwalior
- The Aga Khan
- The King of Barotseland
- The Sultan of Perak
- Prince and Princess Victor Duleep Singh
- Prince Frederick Duleep Singh
- Princess Bamba Duleep Singh
- Princess Catherine Duleep Singh
- Princess Sophia Duleep Singh
- Raja Sir Harnam Singh Ahluwalia, representing the Christians of India

=== Guests at the service of intercession ===
The following guests who were due to attend the coronation in June before its postponement attended the intercession service on the same day but not the coronation in August:

- (Russian Empire) Grand Duke Michael Alexandrovich of Russia, the Queen's nephew (representing his brother, the Russian Emperor)
- The Hereditary Grand Duke of Luxembourg, the Queen's first cousin once removed (representing his father, the Grand Duke of Luxembourg)
- Prince Albert of Belgium, the King's second cousin (representing his uncle, the King of the Belgians)
- (Grand Duchy of Mecklenburg-Strelitz) The Hereditary Grand Duke of Mecklenburg-Strelitz, the King's second cousin (representing his father, the Grand Duke of Mecklenburg-Strelitz)
- The Crown Prince of Montenegro, husband of the late King's second cousin once removed (representing his father, the Prince of Montenegro)
- Prince Philipp of Saxe-Coburg and Gotha, the King's second cousin
- (Kingdom of Württemberg) Duke Robert of Württemberg, the King's second cousin once removed (representing his cousin, the King of Württemberg)
- (Kingdom of Saxony) Prince Johann Georg of Saxony, the King's second cousin once removed (representing his uncle, the King of Saxony)
- (Kingdom of Portugal) The Prince Royal of Portugal, the King's second cousin twice removed (representing his father, the King of Portugal)
- The Crown Prince of Sweden and Norway, the king's third cousin twice removed (representing his father, the King of Sweden and Norway)
- (Austria-Hungary) Archduke Franz Ferdinand of Austria (representing his uncle, the Emperor of Austria)
- Prince Leopold of Bavaria (representing his father, the Prince Regent of Bavaria)
- (Qing dynasty) Prince Zaizhen of China (representing his cousin, the Emperor of China)
- (Khedivate of Egypt) Prince Mohammed Ali of Egypt (representing his brother, the Khedive of Egypt and Sudan)
- (Kingdom of Italy) The Duke and Duchess of Aosta (representing his first cousin, the King of Italy)
- (Empire of Japan) Prince Komatsu Akihito (representing his cousin, the Emperor of Japan)
- (Korean Empire) Prince Yi Kang (representing his father, the Emperor of Korea)
- The Hereditary Prince of Monaco (representing his father, the Prince of Monaco)
- (Qajar Iran) Prince Mass'oud Mirza of Persia (representing his brother, the Shah of Persia)
- (Thailand) The Crown Prince of Siam (representing his father, the King of Siam)
- Infante Carlos of Spain (representing his brother-in-law, the King of Spain)
- (Sultanate of Zanzibar) Prince Said Ali (representing the Sultan of Zanzibar)

== See also ==
- Coronation Ode, composed by Edward Elgar with words by A. C. Benson.
- List of British coronations
- The Coronation of Edward VII, a film reenacting the ceremony
- King Edward VII Coronation Medal
- King Edward VII Police Coronation Medal
- Canadian Coronation Contingent
- Hokitika Clock Tower
