= Law Reform (Frustrated Contracts) Act 1943 =

Act of the Parliament of the United Kingdom

Law Reform (Frustrated Contracts) Act 1943 (Note: Section 3(1).)
- Act of Parliament
- Parliament of the United Kingdom
- Long title: An Act to amend the law relating to the frustration of contracts.
- Citation: 6 & 7 Geo. 6. c. 40
- Territorial extent: United Kingdom

Dates
- Royal assent: 5 August 1943
- Commencement: 5 August 1943 (Note: The Acts of Parliament (Commencement) Act 1793.)
Other legislation
Amended by	Sale of Goods Act 1979

Status: Amended

Text of statute as originally enacted

Revised text of statute as amended

Text of the Law Reform (Frustrated Contracts) Act 1943 as in force today (including any amendments) within the United Kingdom, from legislation.gov.uk.

The Law Reform (Frustrated Contracts) Act 1943 (6 & 7 Geo. 6. c. 40) is an act of the Parliament of the United Kingdom which establishes the rights and liabilities of parties involved in frustrated contracts. It amends previous common law rules on the complete or partial return of pre-payments, where a contract is deemed to be frustrated. It additionally introduces the concept that valuable benefits, other than financial benefits, may be returned upon frustration. It applies only to contracts governed by English law.

== Background ==
In English contract law, a contract which is found to be frustrated – that is, one that is rendered impossible to perform or whose purpose is thwarted through no fault of the contracting parties – will halt all performance of duties thereafter, and end all contractual obligations. Such a result could bring about inequitable results for parties making pre-payments or deposits. An example can be found in the case of Chandler v Webster. Mr Webster contracted to rent a room to Mr Chandler, for the purpose of witnessing Edward VII's coronation, with the understanding that the money for the room would be paid before the procession. Mr Chandler paid £100 (equivalent to £10,500 in 2025) prior to the procession, and subsequently the king fell ill. The Court of Appeal not only struck out Mr Chandler's claim to recover the pre-payment, but decided that Mr Webster was entitled to the remainder of the balance (£41 15s, equivalent to £4,400 in 2025). This common law position was not improved upon until Fibrosa Spolka Akcyjna v Fairbairn Lawson Combe Barbour Ltd, where the House of Lords, overruling Chandler v Webster, decided that pre-payments could be recoverable where that had been a 'total failure' of consideration from the recipient of such a payment (where nothing had been given in return for the payment, prior to the frustrating event).

This result was unsatisfactory however, in that the common law could still produce inequitable results in several instances. For example, where there had indeed been some form of consideration given in return for a pre-payment, or even a complete payment, none would be recoverable following a frustrating event. This principle is exemplified in Whincup v Hughes, where Brett J explained the common law position:

By the contract a specific sum is paid to the testator in respect of a continuing consideration, viz., a personal duty to be performed for six years if both parties should live so long. There is no express stipulation for any return of the premium or any part of it. The death of the testator is no breach of the contract, and the question therefore is, whether, there being no breach on his part, his executors can be made to return the premium or any part of it. Now the case cannot be brought within the rule of law relating to total failure of consideration, or mutual rescission of a contract. It comes within the rule that where a sum of money has been paid for an entire consideration, and there is only a partial failure of consideration, neither the whole nor any part of such sum can be recovered.

== Formation of the act ==
Whilst the common law rules on pre-payments and their retrieval were generally considered to be unjust, the rule of Chandler v Webster stood for over thirty years before it was addressed by the Law Revision Committee, in their Seventh Interim Report. The suggestions of the committee are reflected in the construction and ambit of the act:

A less arbitrary rule should be adopted, whereby the payer should be entitled to return of all monies paid under the contract less the whole of any direct losses incurred by the payee. Where part of a contract could be considered severable, the rule should only apply to the remaining part. No account should be taken of amounts recoverable under insurance, and the law of freight pro rata itineris or of advance freight should remain unaffected except where a frustrated contract was established.

Following this proposal, a bill was introduced, and received royal assent on 5 August 1943. In essence, this act provides:

- Monies paid out before frustration are recoverable afterwards.
- Monies due before frustration are no longer due afterwards.
- A party who has obtained a valuable benefit under the contract may have to pay for it if the court considers it just.
- A party who has incurred expenses in respect of the contract before the frustrating event may recover such expenses from the other party if the court considers it just.

== Provisions ==
=== Section 1: Adjustment of rights and liabilities of parties to frustrated contracts ===
The first section of the act changes the rights of parties, subject to frustrated contracts, to claim payments or damages. Section 1(1) states that the Act applies, subject to following subsections, as follows.

Where a contract governed by English law has become impossible of performance or been otherwise frustrated, and the parties thereto have for that reason been discharged from the further performance of the contract...

It therefore does not modify any previous common law developments on when contracts are frustrated, merely the legal consequences that may follow.

Section 1(2) of the act regards two situations: payments already made; and financial obligations which fell before the frustrating event. Pre-payments can be returned in part, or in full, where it is deemed "just to do so having regard to all the circumstances". It is not mandatory for the courts to award any remuneration for expenses or other payments. The provision differs from the previous system of reimbursement established in Fibrosa Spolka Akcyjna v Fairbairn Lawson Combe Barbour Ltd, where pre-payments could only be recovered where that had been a total lack of consideration. With regard to the second situation, any financial obligation due (as in Chandler v Webster) is excused, subject to where expenses have been incurred by the payee. In this instance, the courts may award an amount up to what was payable prior to the frustrating event.

The case of Gamerco SA v ICM/Fair Warning (Agency) Ltd. demonstrates the application of this section. Here, a large pre-payment of $412,500 was returned to Gamerco SA, where they had incurred expenses prior to a frustrated contract for a series of concerts, despite both sides having begun performance (in the form of advertising). The courts interpreted the section as giving courts broad discretion as to an award, considering the extent of harshness an award imposes upon either party.

Section 1(3) covers instances where one party has obtained a "valuable benefit", other than a payment of money, prior to a frustrating event. The Act in such a situation provides that some, or even all of such a benefit can be recovered from the benefited party, where it is considered just. An example of proceedings involving this section can be found in BP Exploration Co (Libya) Ltd v Hunt (No. 2). Mr Hunt had entered into an agreement with BP Exploration to exploit an oil concession in Libya; BP agreed to fund exploration and development, in order to establish an oil field. In exchange for this, they would receive reimbursement payments – in oil – from Hunt. Prior to the repayment of such reimbursement in full, a new Libyan government assumed total control over the field. Noting that Hunt had gained valuable benefits, from the farmed oil, Robert Goff J identified several steps to be taken in applying the section.

The first steps are to identify and value the benefit. In the instant case, this was the end product received by Hunt, in the form of oil. In any case, there must be a tangible benefit; the situation of Appleby v Myers, where any benefit was destroyed by fire, would not give rise to recovery under this subsection. When valuing the benefit, the influence of the claimant upon the benefit received is of importance; Robert Goff J stated that the principal purpose of the subsection was to prevent the unjust enrichment of one party at another's expense. Following evaluation and identification of any conferred benefit, it is at the discretion of the courts to fix a 'just' sum. Factors such as apportionment of risk and expenses are important in concluding such a sum.

=== Section 2: Provision as to application of this act ===
The second section of the act provides for various instances where the active provisions may be applied differently, or not at all.

Section 2(3) establishes that parties may contract out of the Act, and that if under a true construction of the contract, this is the case, then the section may only apply if it is consistent with such a construction. Robert Goff J however commented that:

Where there is no clear indication that the parties did intend the clause to be applicable in the event of frustration, the court has to be very careful before it draws the inference that the clause was intended to be applicable in such radically changed circumstances.

Section 2(4) deals with the issue of severing parts of frustrated contracts. Where a contract contains multiple obligations, the Act does not apply to obligations which were completed prior to a frustrating event, only to those still in performance.

Section 2(5) excludes certain types of contract from being subject to the act. Charter contracts – except a time charter – or carriage of goods by sea; contracts for insurance; contracts involving Section 7 of the Sale of Goods Act 1979 applies (regarding the perishing of goods).

=== Section 3 ===
Section 3 provides for the short title of the act and the meaning of the word "court".

== See also ==
- Frustration in English law
- Chandler v Webster
- Fibrosa Spolka Akcyjna v Fairbairn Lawson Combe Barbour Ltd
- BP Exploration Co (Libya) Ltd v Hunt (No. 2)

== Bibliography ==
- Chen-Wishart, Mindy (2007). Contract Law. Oxford University Press. ISBN 0-19-920716-X.
- Halson, Roger (2001). Contract Law. Longman. ISBN 0-582-08647-7.
- Koffman, Laurence; Macdonald, Elizabeth (2007). The Law of Contract. Oxford University Press. ISBN 0-19-920715-1.
- McElroy, R; Williams, Glanville (1941). "The Coronation Cases. II". The Modern Law Review. 5 (1). Blackwell Publishing.
- Williams, G L (1944). "The Law Reform (Frustrated Contracts) Act, 1943". The Modern Law Review. 7 (1/2). Blackwell Publishing.
