= United States contract law =

Branch of law in the US

Contract law regulates the obligations established by agreement, whether express or implied, between private parties in the United States. The law of contracts varies from state to state; there is nationwide federal contract law in certain areas, such as contracts entered into pursuant to Federal Reclamation Law.

The law governing transactions involving the sale of goods has become highly standardized nationwide through widespread adoption of the Uniform Commercial Code. There remains significant diversity in the interpretation of other kinds of contracts, depending upon the extent to which a given state has codified its common law of contracts or adopted portions of the Restatement (Second) of Contracts.

== Formation ==
A contract is an agreement between two or more parties creating reciprocal obligations enforceable at law. The elements of a contract are mutual consent, offer and acceptance, consideration, and legal purpose.

=== Agreement ===
Mutual consent, also known as ratification and meeting of the minds, is typically established through the process of offer and acceptance. However, contracts can also be implied in fact, as discussed below. At common law, the terms of a purported acceptance must be the "mirror image" of the terms of the offer. Any variation thereof constitutes a counteroffer.

An offer is a display of willingness by a promissor to be legally bound by terms they specify, made in a way that would lead a reasonable person in the promisee's position to understand that an acceptance is being sought and, if made, results in an enforceable contract. Ordinarily, an offeror is permitted to revoke their offer at any time prior to a valid acceptance. This is partially due to the maxim that an offeror is the "master of his offer."

In the case of options, the general rule stated above applies even when the offeror promises to hold the offer open for a certain period of time. For example, Alice says to Bob, "I'll sell you my watch for $10, and you can have a week to decide." Alice is free to revoke her offer during the week, as long as Bob has not accepted the offer.

However, if the offeree gives some separate consideration (discussed below) to keep the offer open for a certain period of time, the offeror is not permitted to revoke during that period. For example, Alice offers to sell Bob her watch for $10. Bob gives Alice $1 to keep the offer open for a week. Alice is not permitted to revoke during the week.

A counteroffer is a new offer that varies the terms of the original offer. Therefore, it is simultaneously a rejection of the original offer. For example, Alan says to Betty, "I'll sell you my watch for $10." At this point Betty has the power of acceptance. But Betty responds, "I'll only pay $8." Betty's response is a rejection of Alan's offer but gives Alan a new power of acceptance. It is possible to phrase what appears to be a counteroffer so that it does not destroy the original power of acceptance. For example, Alan says to Betty, "I'll sell you my watch for $10." Betty responds, "I wonder whether you would take $8." Betty retains her original power of acceptance (unless Alan revokes), but she does not give Alan a new power of acceptance, as she is not making an offer of her own. Therefore, she is not making a counteroffer either. As such, mere inquiries are not counteroffers.

An acceptance is an agreement, by express act or implied from conduct, to the terms of an offer, including the prescribed manner of acceptance, so that an enforceable contract is formed.

In what is known as a battle of the forms, when the process of offer and acceptance is not followed, it is still possible to have an enforceable contract, as mentioned above with respect to contracts implied in fact.

==== Uniform Commercial Code ====
The Uniform Commercial Code ("UCC") dispenses with the mirror image rule in § 2-207. UCC § 2-207(1) provides that a "definite and seasonable expression of acceptance...operates as" an acceptance, even though it varies the terms of the original offer. Such an expression is typically interpreted as an acceptance when it purports to accept and agrees on the following terms of the original offer: subject matter, quantity, and price. However, such an expression is not interpreted as an acceptance if it is "expressly conditional" on the original offeror's assent to the varied terms, discussed below. This language is known as the proviso. When the proviso is not used, the terms of the contract are determined by subsection 2. When the proviso is used, but there is no assent by the original offeror to the offeree's varied terms, yet the parties go ahead and perform (act like they have a contract, hence a contract implied in fact), the terms of the contract are determined by subsection 3. So, the terms of a contract under 2-207 are never determined by a combination of subsections 2 and 3.

UCC § 2-207(2) of the statute tells what to do with additional terms. It does not explicitly address what to do with different terms. A minority of states, led by California, infer that this was a typographical error by the drafters. As such, those states treat different terms in the same manner as additional terms. The majority rule, however, is that different terms do not become part of the contract; rather, both of the conflicting terms—from both parties—are removed from the contract. This is known as the knockout rule. Any "gaps" resulting from the removal of these terms are "filled" by Article 2's "gap-fillers."

A term in a purported acceptance is different if it directly contradicts the subject matter of a term present in the original offer. A term in a purported acceptance is additional if it contemplates a subject matter not present at all in the original offer. As already mentioned, subsection 2 does tell what to do with additional terms. They do not become part of the contract if either party is not a merchant.

A merchant is defined elsewhere in the UCC as a party that regularly "deals in goods of the kind" or otherwise gives an impression of knowledge or skill regarding the subject matter of the transaction. If both parties are merchants then additional terms in a purported acceptance do become part of the contract unless any of three exceptions apply.

The exceptions are (out of order): objection by the original offeror in advance; objection by the original offeror within a reasonable time after notice; and material alteration of the contract. The third exception, whether the additional terms materially alter the contract, is the most difficult to apply. Typically, to show it, the merchant must be subjected to undue hardship and/or surprise as a result of the varied term, as measured by the industry involved. It is well established that disclaimer of warranty, indemnification, and arbitration are all clauses that do constitute material alterations.

UCC § 2-207(3) only applies when the proviso language from subsection 1 is used. When the proviso is used, there is no contract formed at that time unless the original offeror assents to the terms that the party purporting to accept has made "expressly conditional."

For example, a buyer sends a purchase order with its own terms. The seller sends an acknowledgement with additional and/or different terms and uses the proviso. The buyer must accept the seller's additional and/or different terms, or else no contract is formed at that time.

Frequently, however, the buyer in such a situation does not accept the seller's terms, typically through silence, that is, not signing and returning the form to the seller. Subsection 3 is designed to deal with this situation.

When the parties begin to perform the contract, they form a contract implied in fact. The terms of that contract are determined by this subsection. They consist of those terms both forms agree on. Any pertinent term upon the forms do not agree are not part of the contract but instead are supplied by the Code's gap fillers.

Note that whether the parties are merchants is irrelevant for this subsection. However, private parties do not typically send and receive purchase orders or invoices, so in hypotheticals, the parties typically are merchants.

For example, the Brown Company (buyer) sends a purchase order to the Smith Company (seller) for 100 widgets. Brown's terms are silent as to arbitration. Smith sends an acknowledgement, making its acceptance of Brown's offer "expressly conditional" on Brown's assent to Smith's additional term that any dispute arising from the transaction be resolved by arbitration. Brown does not sign and return Smith's form, but Smith goes ahead and fulfills the order. Brown receives the widgets and pays for them. The forms do not agree as to the term of arbitration. Therefore, if a dispute arises, the arbitration clause is not part of the contract. Instead, a UCC gap-filling provision is used. Since the Code does not supply arbitration, Brown is able to avoid Smith's term and bring an action in court.

==== Examples ====
- Laidlaw v. Organ, 15 U.S. 178 (1817) the seller of tobacco was not entitled to get out of a contract to sell a load at a low price when it transpired that the War of 1812 had ended, and so that prices would rise (because a navy embargo was lifted). Even though the buyer stayed silent about the peace treaty that had just been agreed when he was asked if prices might rise, he was entitled to enforce the contract.
- Pando v. Fernandez, 127 Misc.2d 224 (N.Y. Sup. Ct. 1984) it was held that it was not impossible to prove that a boy had agreed with the winner of $2.8m in a lottery that she would share the winnings with him
- ProCD, Inc. v. Zeidenberg, 86 F.3d 1447 (7th Cir. 1996) the click of a button accepting a license's terms on software counts as agreement
- Specht v. Netscape, 306 F.3d 17 (2d Cir. 2002) simply clicking a download button does not indicate agreement to the terms of a contract if those terms were not conspicuous
- Seixas v. Woods 2 Cai. R. 48 (N.Y. Sup. Ct. 1804) a contract was binding despite making a mistake

=== Consideration and estoppel ===
Consideration is something of value given by a promissor to a promisee in exchange for something of value given by a promisee to a promissor. Typical examples of things of value are acts, forbearances, and/or promises to do so. The latter referring to those things that a party has a legal privilege to do in the first place. So, promising to refrain from committing a tort or crime is not considered valuable for purposes of consideration, but paying someone in exchange for a promise not to smoke would be consideration. This is known as the bargain theory of consideration and requires that the promises to exchange the things be reciprocally induced. This is especially important for the discussion of past consideration, below.

Consideration must be sufficient, but courts do not weigh the adequacy of consideration, partially because in a capitalistic society private parties are entitled and expected to determine the value of things for themselves. In other words, the things being exchanged must have some value in the eyes of the law, but the general rule is that courts do not care how much. Love and affection, for example, would not constitute sufficient consideration, but a penny would. However, sufficient consideration that is grossly inadequate may be deemed unconscionable, discussed below.

Moreover, things that ordinarily constitute sufficient consideration may be deemed insufficient when they are being exchanged for fungible things. For example, $1 is ordinarily sufficient consideration, and $100 is ordinarily sufficient consideration. However, if Alan and Betty agree to exchange $1 for $100, it would not be an enforceable contract for lack of consideration. An exception to this exception is when there is special significance to the $1 bill itself, such as if it was the first dollar a person made in business and carries tremendous sentimental value, similar to the peppercorn rule. Fungible things do not have to be money, though. They can be grains stored in a silo, for example. One bushel of grain being exchanged for 100 bushels of the same grain would not be sufficient consideration.

Past acts cannot constitute consideration. For example, an employer lays off an employee but promises to give him a pension in exchange for his long and faithful service to the company. It is impossible for the employee to presently promise to have worked all those years for the pension. He worked for the paychecks that the company promised in the past, not knowing whether a pension lay in the future. He might have hoped to one day receive a pension, but the company did not promise one until his layoff. Note, in this situation, the employee may be able to prevail on a claim of promissory restitution, but there is no contract for lack of consideration.

Promissory estoppel is a separate cause of action to breach of contract, requiring separate elements to be shown. It has the effect that in many contract like situations, the requirement of consideration need not be present.

The elements of promissory estoppel are:

- an express or implied promise;
- detrimental reliance by the promisee foreseeable to a reasonable person in the promissor's position;
- actual detrimental reliance by the promisee (worsening of their position); and
- for specific performance (as opposed to reliance damages), injustice can only be avoided by enforcing the promise.

==== Examples ====
- Angel v. Murray, 322 A.2d 630 (RI 1974) modification of a contract does not require consideration if the change is made in good faith and agreed by both parties.
- Hamer v. Sidway, 124 N.Y. 538, 27 N.E. 256 (N.Y. 1891) promising to not behave anti-socially amounted to valid consideration for a contract, in this case payment of money by an uncle to a nephew to not swear, drink, gamble and smoke.
- Kirksey v. Kirksey, Ala. Sup. 8 Ala. 131 (1845) is a case standing for the principle that a gratuitous gift or a conditional gift is not valid consideration. A woman had to visit a home to receive a gift, which is not consideration.
- Lingenfelder v. Wainwright Brewing Co., 15 S.W. 844 (1891) promising not to sue did not amount to valid consideration
- McMichael v. Price, 58 P.2d 549 (OK 1936) mutuality of obligation, and an illusory promise. It was not illusory to promise to buy all sand from one supplier, even though there was no contractual obligation to buy any sand at all. This meant there was sufficient mutuality of obligation.
- Wood v. Lucy, Lady Duff-Gordon, 222 N.Y. 88, 118 N.E. 214 (1917) articulates the idea that a promise may be lacking explicitly in a contract, but the whole writing may still create the obligation. Thus, a promise to use reasonable efforts to create profits for another is valid consideration and creates a contract.
- Salsbury v. Northwestern Bell Telephone Co., 221 N.W.2d 609 (IA 1974) charitable subscriptions can be enforced without consideration or detrimental reliance.

=== Formality ===
Ordinarily, contracts do not have to be in writing to be enforceable. However, certain types of contracts do have to be reduced to writing to be enforceable, to prevent frauds and perjuries, hence the name statute of frauds, which also makes it not a misnomer (fraud need not be present to implicate the statute of frauds).

Typically the following types of contracts implicate the statute of frauds:

- Land, including leases over a year and easements
- Suretyships (promises to answer for the debts, defaults, or miscarriages of another)
- Consideration of marriage (not to actually get married but to give a dowry, for example)
- Goods over a certain amount of money (usually $500, as in the UCC)
- Contracts that cannot be performed within one year

For example, a two-year employment contract naturally cannot be performed within one year.

In many states lifetime contracts are not considered to fall within the Statute of Frauds reasoning that life can end at any time, certainly within one year from the time of execution. In other states, notably Illinois, contracts requiring performance for a lifetime are covered by the Statute.

The statute of frauds requires the signature of the party against whom enforcement is sought (the party to be sued for failure to perform). For example, Bob contracts with the Smith Company for two years of employment. The employer would need to sign the writing.

Moreover, the writing for purposes of satisfying the statute of frauds does not need to be the actual contract. It might be a letter, memorializing and formalizing an oral arrangement already made over the phone. Therefore, the signed writing does not need to contain all of the terms that the parties agreed to. At common law, only the essential terms were required in the signed writing. Under the UCC, the only term that must be present in the writing is the quantity. The writing also does not need to be one document, but if there are multiple documents, they must all obviously refer to the same transaction, and they all must be signed. The signature itself does not need to be a full name. Any mark made with the intent to authenticate the writing is satisfactory, such as initials or even such as an X by an illiterate party.

A contract that may otherwise be unenforceable under the statute of frauds may become enforceable under the doctrine of part performance. If the party seeking enforcement of the contract has partially or fulfilled its duties under the contract without objection from the other party, the performing party may be able to use its performance to hold the other party to the terms of the contract.

No writing is required when:

- Goods have been received and accepted;
- Payment has been made and accepted;
- Goods are specially manufactured (there is no market for them); or
- under the UCC, the party against whom enforcement is being sought admits a certain quantity of goods.

The last exception applies up to the quantity admitted, which may include the entire contract. This reversed the rule at common law that permitted a defendant to testify that he indeed contracted with the plaintiff but refuses to perform because it is not in writing.

=== Privity ===
Under the principle of privity, a person may not reap the benefits or be required to suffer the burdens of a contract to which they were not a party.

== Breach of contract ==
=== Performance ===
- Jacob & Youngs, Inc. v. Kent, 230 N.Y. 239 (1921) is a case about a builder who used the wrong kind of piping in the construction of a house and the homeowner refused to pay. The court held that the builder was entitled to payment, as he had substantially performed the work, but the builder was subject to a deduction in payment for the difference in the value of the home with the wrong piping.

=== Damages ===
The primary remedy for breach of contract is expectation damages, or "benefit of the bargain." At law, this is monetary compensation. At equity, it can be specific performance or an injunction, among other things. For example, Dan and Pam have an enforceable contract for the sale of Dan's watch. The price they agreed to was $10. The actual value of the watch is $15. Pam would be able to successfully pursue a claim for $5. She might elect this route if she did not want to keep the watch but sell it to a third party for a profit. Alternatively, Pam could successfully pursue a claim whereby the court would order Dan to sell the watch for the original price. She might elect this route if she actually wanted the watch for herself.

The remedy for quasi-contracts (contracts implied in law) is quantum meruit, the reasonable or "fair market" value of goods or services rendered. The remedy for promissory estoppel is reliance damages.

==== Examples ====
- Hawkins v. McGee, 84 N.H. 114, 146 A. 641 (N.H. 1929) the plaintiff's hand was injured by electrical wiring, and the doctor promised surgery to give him a 100% good hand. The operation failed, and the plaintiff won damages to the value of what he expected to get, compared to what he had. However, he received no extra compensation for pain and suffering.
- United States Naval Institute v. Charter Communications, Inc., 936 F.2d 692 (Second Cir. 1991) is a case discussing the extent and nature of contract damages. Damages for breach of contract are generally to provide damages for the injured party's loss; an injured party is not awarded damages based on the breaching party's gain.
- Snepp v. United States 444 U.S. 507 (1980) restitution damages

=== Specific performance ===
Specific performance occurs when a court orders a party to perform a specific act. In the context of a contract, specific performance requires that a party in breach fulfill its duties under the contract.

=== Arbitration ===
Parties are permitted to agree to arbitrate disputes arising from their contracts. Under the Federal Arbitration Act (which has been interpreted to cover all contracts arising under federal or state law), arbitration clauses are generally enforceable unless the party resisting arbitration can show unconscionability, fraud or something else that undermines the entire contract.

== Quasi-contract ==
The terms quasi-contract and contract implied in law are synonymous. There are two types of quasi-contract. One is an action in restitution. The other is unjust enrichment. Note, therefore, that it is improper to say that quasi-contract, implied in law contract, and unjust enrichment are all synonymous, because unjust enrichment is only one type of the broader category of quasi-contracts (contracts implied in law).

Contracts implied in law differ from contracts implied in fact in that contracts implied in law are not true contracts. Contracts implied in fact are ones that the parties involved presumably intended. In contracts implied in law, one party may have been completely unwilling to participate, as shown below, especially for an action in restitution. There has been no mutual assent, in other words, but public policy essentially requires a remedy.

=== Unjust Enrichment ===
The elements of this cause of action are:

- conferral of a benefit on another;
- the other's knowledge of the benefit;
- the other's acceptance or retention of the benefit;
- circumstances requiring the other to pay the fair value for the benefit to avoid inequity.
- Britton v. Turner, 6 N.H. 481 (1834) an employee who left work on a farm after nine months, but had contracted to be paid $120 at the end of one year, was entitled to receive some payment ($95) even though the contract was not completed.

=== Restitution ===
The full name of this cause of action is "restitution for actions required to preserve another's life or health." It is available when a party supplies goods or services to someone else, even though the recipient is unaware or does not consent. Unawareness and non-consent can both be due to unconsciousness, but the latter also includes incapacity, which in turn refers to mental incompetence and/or infancy (minority).

The elements of this cause of action are:

- the supplier acts "unofficiously", that is, isn't interfering in the affairs of the recipient for no reason;
- the supplier acts with the intent to charge money for doing so;
- the goods or services are necessary to prevent the recipient from suffering serious bodily injury or pain;
- the recipient is unable to consent;
- the supplier has no reason to know that the recipient would not consent if they could; and,
- if the recipient is "extremely" mentally incompetent or young and objects, the non-consent is immaterial.

== Construction ==
- Uniform Commercial Code §2-301
- Restatement §201(1)
- Uniform Commercial Code §2-313(1)(b)
- Frigaliment Importing Company v BNS International Sales Corp, 190 FSupp 116 (SDNY 1960)

=== Express terms ===
- Henningsen v. Bloomfield Motors, on warranties
- Restatement §213, parol evidence rule: a written agreement that is completely integrated discharges prior oral agreements in its scope.
- Mitchill v Lath 247 NY 377 (1928)
- Masterson v Sine 68 Cal 2d 222 (1968) Traynor J
- Restatement §203, trade usage non-excluded by parol evidence rules
- Columbia Nitrogen Corp v Royster Co, 451 F 2d 3 (4th 1971) 31,000 tons of phosphate a year for $50 a ton. The buyer could rely on custom of adjusting prices in the fertilizer industry despite the contract's express price, when the market fell.
- Southern Concrete Services v Mableton Contractors, Inc, 407 F Supp 581 (ND Ga 1975)

=== Implied terms ===
- Restatement §223, courts can supply a missing term by resorting to trade usage or course of dealing "which is fairly to be regarded as establishing a common basis of understanding"
- UCC §1-205 and 2-208
- Wood v. Lucy, Lady Duff-Gordon, 118 NE 214 (1917) Cardozo J, promise to use reasonable efforts to generate license revenues properly implied in the contract. "The law has outgrown its primitive stage of formalism when the precise word was the sovereign talisman, and every slip was fatal.... A promise may be lacking, and yet the whole writing may be 'instinct with and obligation,' imperfectly expressed...." UCC 2-306(2)
- Bloor v Falstaff Brewing Corp 601 F2d 609 (2nd 1979) Friendly J, breach of best efforts covenant
- Uniform Commercial Code §315
- Kellogg Bridge Company v. Hamilton, 110 U.S. 108 (1884) there was an implied warranty of fitness for the Kellog Co to build a bridge for a railway company.
- Kirke La Shelle Company v. The Paul Armstrong Company et al, 263 NY 79 (1933) "In every contract there is an implied covenant that neither party shall do anything, which will have the effect of destroying or injuring the right of the other party, to receive the fruits of the contract, which means that in every contract there exists an implied covenant of good faith and fair dealing."

=== Unconscionable terms ===
Interpretation

- Uniform Commercial Code §2-302, 2-314, 2-316, 2-719
- Moscatiello v Pittsburgh Contractors Equipment Co
- Pierce v Catalina Yachts, Inc
- Restatement (Second) of Contracts §211
- Darner Motor Sales v Universal Underwriters
- Gordinier v Aetna Casualty & Surety Co
- Farm Bureau Mutual insurance Co v Sandbulte
- Max True Plastering Co v United States Fidelty & Guaranty Co

Substance

- Restatement (Second) of Contracts §208
- Post v Jones
- Williams v. Walker-Thomas Furniture Co., 350 F2d 445 (DC 1965) procedural unconscionability
- Pittsley v Houser
- People v Two Wheel Corp
- Maxwell v Fidelity Financial Services, Inc
- Kansas City Wholesale Grocery Co. v. Weber Packing Corp., 93 Utah 414 (1937) a contract clause limiting the time for allowing complaints about the delivery of a shipment of ketchup was unconscionable
- Buchwald v. Paramount, Cal. App. LEXIS 634 (1990) Paramount's contract stipulating it would only pay for work if a $288m film earned a net profit was unconscionable.
- Harris v. Blockbuster, Inc., 622 F.Supp.2d 396 (2009)
- Henningsen v. Bloomfield Motors, Inc., 161 A2d 69 (1960)

=== Consumer protection ===
- Wall Street Reform and Consumer Protection Act 2010
- Fair Debt Collection Practices Act
- Fair Credit Reporting Act
- Truth in Lending Act
- Fair Credit Billing Act
- Gramm-Leach-Bliley Act
- Federal Trade Commission
- U.S. Department of Justice

== Defenses and grounds for avoidance ==
=== Mistake ===
Unilateral mistakes

- Donovan v. RRL Corp., 109 Cal.Rptr.2d 807 (2001).
- Restatement, Second, Contracts §§153-154
- Speckel v Perkins

Mutual mistakes, shared assumptions

- Restatement, Second, Contracts §§151-152 and 154
- Sherwood v. Walker 66 Mich 568, 33 NW 919 (1887)
- Nester v Michigan Land & Iron Co
- Griffith v Brymer
- Wood v Boynton
- Firestone & Parson, Inc v Union League of Philadelphia
- Everett v Estate of Sumstad
- Lenawee County Board of Health v. Messerly, 331 N.W.2d 203 (1982) it transpired an illegal septic system had contaminated the ground.
- Beachcomber Coins, Inc v Boskett
- Uniform Commercial Code §§2-312 to 2-315

Transcription mistakes

- Restatement, Second, Contracts §§155
- Chimart Associates v Paul

=== Duress and undue influence ===
- Duress

=== Misrepresentation ===
- United States v. Spearin, 248 U.S. 132 (1918) superior knowledge of US government
- Helene Curtis Industries, Inc. v. United States (160 Ct. Cl. 437, 312 F.2d 774 (1963) the superior knowledge doctrine gives the US government a duty of disclosure
- Laidlaw v. Organ 15 U.S. 178 (1817), on caveat emptor
- Obde v. Schlemeyer 56 Wash 2d 449, 353 P2d 672 (Supreme Court of Washington, 1960) termite infested house not revealed to buyers. Even though no questions asked, seller still liable for failure to disclose.
- Smith v. Bolles, 132 U.S. 125 (1889) damages for misrepresentation of share sale did not entitle the buyer to get money as if the representation were true

=== Illegality ===
- ProCD v. Zeidenberg, copyrights
- SCO v. DaimlerChrysler, license agreements
- Stoddard v. Martin 1 R.I. 1 (1828) a contract to bet on the outcome of a Senate election was void, because it was contrary to public policy to gamble.

== See also ==
- Restatement (Second) of Contracts 1962-1979
- Uniform Commercial Code
- Uniform Commercial Code adoption
- English contract law
- United States tort law
- Civil Procedure in the United States
- Contract theory
