= Kirksey =

Kirksey may refer to:

== People ==
- Christian Kirksey (born 1992), American football linebacker
- Dianne Kirksey (1950–2020), American filmmaker
- Ivy Kirksey (1902–????), American baseball player
- Jack Kirksey (1928–2026), American politician
- Jerry Kirksey (born 1940), American magazine editor
- Jon Kirksey (born 1970), American football defensive tackle
- Larry Kirksey (born 1951), American football player and coach
- Morris Kirksey (1895–1981), American athlete and rugby player
- Roy Kirksey (1947–1981), American football guard
- William Kirksey (born 1966), American football linebacker
- Kirksey Nix (born 1943), American mobster
- Kirksey M. Nix (1914–1979), American judge and politician

== Places ==
- James Kirksey Plantation, former plantation in Leon County, Florida
- Kirksey, Kentucky, unincorporated community in Calloway County
- Loy Kirksey House, historical building in Clark County, Arkansas

== Other ==
- Kirksey Architecture, architecture firm headquartered in Houston, Texas
- Kirksey v. Kirksey, legal case
