= Sale of Goods Law and COVID-19 =

The Uniform Commercial Code is a standard Code that has been adopted by all 50 states. Still, every state has the ability to pick and chose what specific provisions of the UCC it wishes to adopt and make its own modifications. Uniform Commercial Code Article 2 governs the sale of goods that are over the price of $500. Illinois specifically has adopted the exact same Article 2 of the UCC to govern the sale of goods; This is also called the model code. The purpose of the UCC is to allow parties to freely enter into a contract for the sale of goods with their own terms, but still have default rules and gap-fillers for terms in the contract that are missing, ambiguous, or conflicting. A party may include in its contract a force majeure clause. A force majeure clause is a contract clause that allows parties to be free of liability and obligation in the event that an extraordinary capacity event beyond the parties control occurs.

There has been much debate regarding whether or not COVID-19 is considered an extraordinary capacity event that would be covered by the force majeure clause in many contracts. Many businesses are arguing that the force majeure clauses contained in its contract should be in full force and effect due to the Illinois Executive Order Regulations released during the pandemic that limited production and man-power. A recent case in Illinois discusses if COVID-19 should be considered an extraordinary capacity event under force majeure clauses. In Rudolph, the Court does not decide if COVID-19 is an even covered by a force majeure clause. It instead provides that every case needs its own individual analysis in deciding if the force majeure clause is in full force and effect for every unique circumstance in which the parties state that they could not perform under the contract. The Court notes that in order for the force majeure to be relevant due to COVID, lack of performance by the party must have completely been out of its/their control, and that government regulation could be evidence of that. In determining what is out a parties control, it is important to take in consideration all of the things that were impacted due to COVID-19 including: supply chains, production restrictions, employee restrictions, health restrictions, etc. This is going to be an ongoing issue, and the bigger the losses are due to COVID-19, the more important the law regarding force majeure clauses becomes.
