= Commercial law =

Rules and guidelines of trade

Commercial law, also known as business law, mercantile law or trade law depending on jurisdiction, is the body of law or system of rules that govern the rights, relations, obligations, and conduct of persons and organizations engaged in commercial and business activities. It is often considered to be a branch of civil law and deals with issues of both private law and public law.

Commerce is the system of activities and organizations involved in the exchanges of products, services, and other valuable assets. These activities and the commercial entities—which are primarily engaged in profit-driven transactions—are subject to commercial law, which provides the legal framework for their formation, operation, and oversight. By establishing rules for transactions and governing business enterprises, commercial law ensures that exchanges are orderly, enforceable, and predictable; promotes fair and efficient competition; protects intellectual property and innovative investments; safeguards consumer rights and public trust; and upholds ethical standards in business conduct.

Commercial law is understood as the body of regulations that govern a broad range of matters involving sales, lease, finance, trade and commercial entities. This, non-exhaustively, includes tax, mergers and acquisitions, insurance, employment, business-to-business or business-to-consumer relations, carriage of goods, guarantees and indemnities, partnerships, and principal-agent relationships. Many of these categories further fall within financial law, a subset of commercial law pertaining specifically to financing and the financial markets. Additionally, depending on the jurisdiction, commercial law legislation may be codified into either civil or commercial code.

In the United States, commercial law is the province of both the United States Congress, under its power to regulate interstate commerce, and the states, under their police power. Efforts have been made to create a unified body of commercial law in the United States; the most successful of these attempts has resulted in the general adoption of the Uniform Commercial Code, which has been adopted in all 50 states (with some modification by state legislatures), the District of Columbia, and the U.S. territories.

Various regulatory frameworks govern the conduct of commerce, especially regarding business-to-consumer and employer-employee relations. Examples of these frameworks include privacy laws, workplace safety laws, and food and drug laws.

In some legal systems, business disputes are handled by specialized commercial courts which are judicial institutions responsible for enforcing and interpreting commercial laws to resolve disputes arising from business-related disagreements.

== Content ==
Commercial law covers the following legal areas :

- Legal status of businesses
  - Sole traders
  - Corporate law
- Competition law
- Consumer law
- Advertising and marketing regulations
- Contract law
- Goods and services law
- Intellectual property law
  - Copyright law
  - Patent law
  - Trademark law
- Financial law
  - Credit and securities laws
  - Wage law, and minimum wage laws in particular
- Tax law
- Banking regulations
- Insurance law
- Bankruptcy law
- International trade law
- E-commerce law

This broad area of law covers many topics, from forming new companies, drafting business contracts, employment processes, mergers and acquisitions, consumer rights to commercial litigation. It also provides a comprehensive legal framework that supports the operations of businesses regardless of their size. It ensures that businesses or other entities that engage in commerce adhere to set rules and guidelines, creating a fair and competitive commercial environment while providing legal remedies to resolve disputes.

== History ==
During the Middle Ages, Italy was the cradle of many modern institutions at the basis of commercial law. Around the 16th century, the trade of Italian maritime republics was the promoter of the birth of commercial law: the jurist Benvenuto Stracca, (Ancona, 1509–1579) published in 1553 the treatise De mercatura seu mercatore tractats; it was one of the first, if not the first, legal imprint dealing specifically with commercial law. This treatise focused on merchants and merchant contracts, practices and maritime rights, to which he soon added extensive discussions of bankruptcy, factors and commissions, third party transfers, and insurance. For this reason, Stracca is often considered the father of commercial law and author of the first Italian treaty about the insurance contract, beyond about the commerce. The legal work of Italian jurists had an impact on Holland, Germany, England and France.

== See also ==
- Business ethics
- Commercial court
- Trade justice
- Socially responsible investing
- Dumping (pricing policy)
- Economic development
- Fair trade
- Commercial revolution
- Trade and development
- Commercial management
- Law and economics
