= American Insurance Association =

Insurance industry trade association

The American Insurance Association (AIA) is an insurance industry trade association representing about 300 insurance companies that provide property insurance and/or casualty insurance in the United States.

== Overview ==
Founded in 1866 as the National Board of Fire Underwriters (NBFU), it consolidated with two other associations, the AIA and the Association of Casualty and Surety Companies, to form the current organization.

The AIA is legally incorporated as a tax-exempt organization under Section 501(c)(6) of the US Internal Revenue Code (Title 26 of the United States Code) and has IRS Employer Identification Number 133173374. It is based in Washington, D.C.

== Activities ==
The organization’s activities include lobbying local, state, and federal policymakers on behalf of its members; republishing and analyzing recent legislation and regulatory agency rulemaking to determine and communicate to members potential impacts on their business operations; engaging in public relations on behalf of the property-casualty insurance industry for example by issuing press releases, and providing job-posting and job-application services for employers and employees in the property-casualty insurance industry.

== American Insurance Association v. Garamendi ==
In 2003, the association went before the U.S. Supreme Court to challenge a California law that required insurance companies to disclose Holocaust era policies in order to do business in the state.

In American Insurance Association v. Garamendi, the court sided with the AIA and found the law unconstitutional because it would "interfere with the president's ability to conduct the nation's foreign policy."

== See also ==
- Marc Racicot
- UCC Insurance
