= Output contract =

An output contract is an agreement in which a producer agrees to sell his or her entire production to the buyer, who in turn agrees to purchase the entire output. Example: an almond grower enters into an output contract with an almond packer: thus the producer has a "home" for output of nuts, and the packer of nuts is happy to try the particular product. The converse of this situation is a requirements contract, under which a seller agrees to supply the buyer with as much of a good or service as the buyer wants, in exchange for the buyer's agreement not to buy that good or service elsewhere.

Uniform Commercial Code comment section 2-306: A term which measures the quantity by the output of the seller or the requirements of the buyer, means such actual output or requirements that may occur in good faith. Good faith cessation of production terminates any further obligations thereunder and excuses further performance by the party discontinuing production. However, the cessation of production must be in light of bankruptcy or other similar situations. The yield of less profit from a sale than expected does not excuse further performance of an output contract. See Feld vs. Henry S. Levy & Sons, Inc. (New York, 1975) or Technical Assistance International, Inc. vs. United States (U.S. Court of Appeals, 1998).
