= Ever-Tite Roofing Corp. v. Green =

1955 American contract law case

Ever-Tite Roofing Corporation v. Green
- Court: Louisiana Court of Appeals
- Decided: 1955
- Citations: 83 So. 2d 449 (Louisiana, 1955)

Court membership
- Judge sitting: Justice Ayres

Keywords
- breach of contract, abrogation, notice

Ever-Tite Roofing Corporation v. Green 83 So. 2d 449 (Louisiana, 1955) is an American contract law case. It is commonly taught to first year law students.

== Background ==
The Texas-based roofing company had made an agreement with the Greens, a family in neighboring Louisiana, to re-roof their house. The contract had a provision that it would not go into effect until commencement of performing the work. There was some delay between the signing of the agreement and the start of work because the work was being done on credit and the roofing company had to get the Greens' credit checked. Once their credit was deemed worthy, the roofers loaded up their trucks and drove from their base in Shreveport, Louisiana to Webster Parish, Louisiana where the Greens lived. Upon arriving, the roofers found that another roofing company was already doing the job. The Greens forbade Ever-Tite from doing the job as agreed. Having not been made aware of this, nor had the Greens communicated a desire to cancel the agreement, the roofing company sued for the cost of driving to the property and lost profit.

The Trial Court ruled for the Greens, also awarding attorney's fees to them, and the roofing company appealed.

== Judgement ==
The appellate Court focused on whether the agreement had gone into force and become a contract. Relying on the Restatement of Contracts, the Court noted that "the power to create a contract by acceptance of an offer terminates at the time specified in the offer, or, if no time is specified, at the end of a reasonable time". Since the agreement had no specified time, the Court then went about deciding whether the actual time had been reasonable. Since the delays in processing the Green's credit check were not unusual, there was still time to accept the offer. Defendants argued that the work was never commenced, since the roofers never actually started roofing the house. The Court however ruled that the work had actually commenced the moment the roofing company loaded its trucks, and that the contract went into force in that moment. Since there was a contract in place when the Greens refused to let the roofers from doing the job, there was a breach of contract. Thus the Appellate Court reversed the findings of the lower court and ruled for the plaintiffs. Damages were awarded to the sum of $85.37 for the cost of loading and driving to the property, and $226 in lost profits. No attorney's fees were awarded though, as their contract made no mention of the assignment of such fees: another reversal of the lower court.
