= McMichael v. Price =

Case

- Court: Supreme Court of Oklahoma
- Decided: May 5, 1936
- Docket nos.: 23797
- Defendant: W. M. McMichael
- Plaintiffs: Harley T. Price, doing business as Sooner Sand Company

Case history
- Prior actions: Appeal from District Court, Tulsa County

Court membership
- Judges sitting: Osborne, Michael E. Riley, David Roger Corn, Thomas L. Gibson

Case opinions
- Decision by: Osborne

McMichael v. Price, 58 P.2d 549 (OK 1936), was a case decided by the Supreme Court of Oklahoma that held that a constraint on discretion was enough to ensure mutuality of obligation in a requirements contract.

== Factual background ==
The plaintiff Harley T. Price formed a contract with defendant W.M. McMichael to enter the sand business, Sooner Sand Company on February 25, 1929. Specifically, part of the contract read that:

[Price] agrees to purchase and accept from [McMichael] all of the sand ... which [Price] can sell ..."

When McMichael refused to sell the sand, Price sued for breach of contract in Tulsa county. The trial jury found for plaintiff Price, and McMichael appealed.

== Decision ==
The Supreme Court of Oklahoma affirmed the verdict for the plaintiff. McMichael argued that this was an illusory promise because it lacked mutuality of obligation - he contended that the plaintiff could escape all contract liability for simply refusing to sell sand. The court held that the contract did have mutuality of obligation because the contract constrained Price's discretion. Price was required to buy all the sand that he would sell from McMichael, so if he wanted to be in the sand business he was bound to buy from McMichael. The court noted that Price was an experienced sand salesman, and that while the parties were in business Price was making a profit.
