= Requirements contract =

Type of contract between suppliers and buyers

A requirements contract is a contract in which one party agrees to supply as much of a good or service as is required by the other party, and in exchange the other party expressly or implicitly promises that it will obtain its goods or services exclusively from the first party. For example, a grocery store might enter into a contract with the farmer who grows oranges under which the farmer would supply the grocery store with as many oranges as the store could sell. The farmer could sue for breach of contract if the store were thereafter to purchase oranges for this purpose from any other party. The converse of this situation is an output contract, in which one buyer agrees to purchase however much of a good or service the seller is able to produce.

== Problems ==
=== Consideration ===
Several problems typically arise with requirements contracts. The first is consideration. There would technically be no breach of the contract if the buyer bought nothing because the buyer is agreeing to buy only as much as the buyer needs. In the above example, the grocery store might void its obligation to buy from the farmer by deciding not to carry oranges. Courts generally sidestep the concern that the buyer is not actually required to buy anything by noting that the contract is nonetheless the surrender of the right to buy from another party. Put simply, "[t]he buyer under a requirements contract does not promise to buy as much as she desires to buy but, rather, to buy as much as she needs". However, such a contract would likely be deemed illusory if the buyer reserved the right to buy from other parties.

=== Defined terms ===
Another problem is the lack of a defined term. Contracts must have terms that are sufficiently defined for a court to be able to determine where a breach has occurred. It would be difficult to determine whether the buyer in a requirements contract is falsely claiming that his needs are lower than they actually are as a ploy to achieve a renegotiation or rescission of the contract. Conversely, if market conditions make the contract price a windfall for the buyer, that buyer may decide to buy more than it actually needs in order to go into competition against the seller. Courts often look to the history of dealings between the parties and to the standards within the industry to determine if the buyer is acting in bad faith for breach of contract actions on requirements contracts.

Until fairly recently, requirements contracts were deemed void under the law of France for lack of defined terms under Articles 1129 and 1583 of the French Civil Code. In Belgium, by contrast, court decisions have consistently held such contracts to be valid, despite the Belgian Civil Code having language identical to that of France. In the context of transactions in goods, most jurisdictions in the United States apply Section 2-306(1) of the Uniform Commercial Code, which imposes a good faith limitation on purchases under a requirements contract. The Code states:

§ 2-306. Output, Requirements and Exclusive Dealings.

(1) A term which measures the quantity by the output of the seller or the requirements of the buyer means such actual output or requirements as may occur in good faith, except that no quantity unreasonably disproportionate to any stated estimate or in the absence of a stated estimate to any normal or otherwise comparable prior output or requirements may be tendered or demanded.

Simply put, this means that a requirements contract for goods is valid, but might not be enforced if the buyer makes demands that are unreasonable compared to either prior estimates or industry standards. The Uniform Commercial Code does not apply to sales of services.

=== Antitrust concerns ===
Finally, antitrust concerns sometimes arise because a requirements contract prohibits the buyer from doing business in a particular commodity with a party other than the seller. This may create an exclusive dealing arrangement which gives the seller monopoly power over the buyer, preventing the buyer from seeking a better deal if the market becomes more competitive. Conversely, a buyer able to generate sufficient demand can absorb all of the seller's output, effectively removing that seller from competing on the open market. Requirements contracts have nevertheless been upheld in the face of challenges on antitrust grounds. Robert Bork, in The Antitrust Paradox, examines requirements contracts and contends that they are not anticompetitive precisely because they are a product of freedom of contract. He argues that no one would sign a requirements contract with a seller in the first place unless that seller offered a better deal than its competitors, and a better deal could only be offered by a more competitive seller. Bork concludes, "[t]he truth appears that there never has been a case in which exclusive dealing or requirements contracts were shown to injure competition".
