= Harris v. Blockbuster, Inc. =

2009 Texas district court case

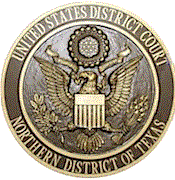
- Court: United States District Court for the Northern District of Texas
- Full case name: Cathryn Elaine Harris, et al. v. Blockbuster, Inc.
- Decided: April 15, 2009
- Docket nos.: 3:09-cv-00217
- Defendant: Blockbuster, Inc.
- Plaintiffs: Cathryn Elaine Harris, et al.
- Citation: 622 F. Supp. 2d 396

Court membership
- Judge sitting: Barbara M. Lynn

Harris v. Blockbuster, Inc., 622 F. Supp. 2d 396 (N.D. Tex. 2009), was a case in which the United States District Court for the Northern District of Texas ruled that when a contract has a clause that authorizes one party to make changes to the "contract" without notification, that it is illusory and hence the entire "contract" is void.

== Background ==
Blockbuster operated a service called Blockbuster Online that allowed customers to rent movies through the internet and entered a contract with Facebook to disseminate customers' movie choices through social media on Facebook, whereby Facebook would broadcast a customer's movie rental choice to their Facebook friends when a video rental transaction is made. The plaintiffs claim that agreement with Facebook violates the Video Privacy Protection Act, which prohibits video service providers from disclosing personal identifiable information without consent.

Blockbuster attempted to invoke an arbitration provision that customers agreed to in the "Terms and Conditions" when joining Blockbuster Online. The provision waives the right of its users to commence any class action and allowed Blockbuster to reserves the right to modify the "Terms and Conditions" at its sole discretion and at any time. The plaintiffs argued that the arbitration provision was unenforceable because it was illusory and unconscionable. Blockbuster issued a motion to compel individual arbitration.

== Judgment ==
On April 15, 2009, the District Court for the Northern District of Texas denied Blockbuster's motion to compel and ruled that Blockbuster Online's Terms and Conditions were unenforceable because they gave Blockbuster too much discretion in modifying the terms of the agreement. Following the reasoning in a Fifth Circuit case, Morrison v. Amway Corp., and consistent with a Ninth Circuit case, Douglas v. U.S. District Court ex rel Talk America the court found that Blockbuster's arbitration provision was illusory and unenforceable, because there was nothing in the Terms and Conditions that would prevent Blockbuster from "unilaterally changing any part of the contract", "at its sole discretion" and "at any time."

== See also ==
- Electronic Privacy Information Center, which filed an amicus brief in the case
