= Douglas v. U.S. District Court ex rel Talk America =

Douglas v. U.S. Dist. Court
- Court: United States Court of Appeals for the Ninth Circuit
- Full case name: Douglas v. U.S. Dist. Court ex rel Talk America
- Decided: June 7, 2007
- Citation: 495 F. 3d 1062

Court membership
- Judges sitting: Alex Kozinski, Ronald M. Gould, Consuelo M. Callahan

Douglas v. U.S. Dist. Court ex rel Talk America, 495 F.3d 1062 (2007), is a U.S. 9th Circuit Court of Appeals case that examines whether a service provider may change the terms of its service contract by merely posting a revised contract on its website, without informing the other party of the changes.

== Facts ==
Joe Douglas contracted for long-distance telephone service with America Online. Talk America subsequently acquired this business from AOL and continued to provide telephone service to AOL's former customers. Talk America then added four provisions to the service contract: (1) additional service charges; (2) a class action waiver; (3) an arbitration clause; and (4) a choice-of-law provision pointing to New York law. Talk America posted the revised contract on its website but, according to Douglas, it never notified him that the contract had changed. Unaware of the new terms, Douglas continued using Talk America's services for four years.

After becoming aware of the additional charges, Douglas filed a class action lawsuit in district court, charging Talk America with violations of the Federal Communications Act, breach of contract and violations of various California consumer protection statutes. Talk America moved to compel arbitration based on the modified contract and the district court granted the motion. Because the Federal Arbitration Act, 9 U.S.C. § 16, does not authorize interlocutory appeals of a district court order compelling arbitration, Douglas petitioned for a writ of mandamus.

== Judgment ==
The trial court, the Central District of California, granted defendant's motion to compel arbitration. The court also found that the additional clauses in the revised contract were enforceable as a matter of law. Douglas petitioned for writ of mandamus.

The 9th Circuit Court of Appeals granted the Plaintiff's petition for writ of mandamus. On review, the court determined that Plaintiff was not bound by the terms of the revised contract. The court reasoned that the new contract terms constituted an offer and were not binding unless properly accepted. The Plaintiff did not accept the offer because "an offeree cannot assent to an offer unless he knows of its existence."

== Significance ==
The ruling examines whether a service provider may change the terms of its service contract by merely posting a revised contract on its website.

== See also ==
- Illusory promise
- Harris v. Blockbuster, Inc.
