= Charles City College =

Private college in Iowa, US (1967–1968)

Coordinates: 43.07°N 92.67°W

Charles City College was a private liberal arts college that operated from 1967 to 1968 in Charles City, Iowa. It was one of several Midwestern colleges established by local civic leaders with the support and encouragement of Parsons College in Fairfield, Iowa. These Parsons "satellite schools" were by-products of the strong growth and apparent success of Parsons during the late 1950s and early 1960s, and all followed the "Parsons Plan" academic model developed at that school. None of the schools, however, were ultimately successful.

The "Parsons Plan" academic model employed at Charles City was the brainchild of Millard Roberts, who was the president of Parsons College from 1955 to 1967; the multi-faceted plan featured innovative teaching and administrative techniques and emphasized the recruitment of a geographically and academically diverse student body. Among other characteristics, the "Parsons Plan" schools welcomed unconventional students who had not seen success at other colleges. In the 1960s, the schools were also attended by a substantial number of young men seeking draft deferments that would allow them to avoid military service during the Vietnam War.

Charles City's reputation and fortunes were strongly tied to those of Parsons and when Parsons faltered beginning in 1967 the prospects for Charles City College and the other Parsons satellite schools grew bleak. The satellite schools also suffered from a lack of funding, high student turnover and accreditation issues. Ultimately, none of the "Parsons Plan" colleges became economically viable and all closed by the mid-1970s. Charles City College had the shortest life of the Parsons satellite schools, closing in 1968 after a single year of operation.

== See also ==
- Salsbury v. Northwestern Bell Telephone Co.: a court case involving the school
