= UCC Insurance =

UCC Insurance generally insures the attachment, perfection and priority of security interests in personal property. UCC Insurance is utilized for transactions described in Article 9, "Secured Transactions", of the Uniform Commercial Code,"UCC". All of the larger land-title insurance companies now offer various versions of UCC insurance. The policies contain significant differences, but tend to serve the same purpose.

== Coverage ==
Personal property is generally anything that is not real property. This coverage includes movable collateral, such as equipment or inventory; intellectual property, including patents and trademarks and copyrightable matters (but not copyrighted matters which are excluded from the UCC); software and software embedded in goods; general intangibles like contract rights; payment intangibles; and investment property like common stock. Also covered is personal property that has become so affixed to the real property that an interest in real property arises under real property law.

In addition to the basic lien-priority coverage, UCC insurance covers many of the risks associated with the perfection of a security interest through the central filing system, such as the authorized execution of the lien-granting document by the debtor, misindexed filings, unauthorized termination statements filed against the record, the correctness of the debtor name, filing in the appropriate jurisdictions, and similar matters. Additionally, the coverage insures the gap between the search report and the date of filing.

== Policy variety ==
While various companies use specific brand names, the two main types of policies are the Lender's Policy and the Buyer's Policy. A Lender's Policy will insure attachment, perfection and priority of a secured party's lien. A Buyer's Policy will insure that personal property items are purchased "free and clear" of lien. Specific policies should be thoroughly examined as there is a lack of uniformity in the marketplace.
