= Salsbury v. Northwestern Bell Telephone Co. =

Iowa Supreme Court case

- Court: Iowa Supreme Court
- Full case name: John Salsbury, Appellee, v. Northwestern Bell Telephone Company, Appellant.
- Decided: September 18, 1974
- Defendant: Northwestern Bell Telephone Co.
- Plaintiff: John Salsbury
- Citation: 221 N.W.2d 609, 1974 Iowa Sup. LEXIS 1120

Court membership
- Judges sitting: David Harris, Don LeGrand, W. W. Reynoldson

Case opinions
- Decision by: David Harris

Salsbury v. Northwestern Bell Telephone Co., 221 N.W.2d 609 (IA 1974), was a case decided by the Iowa Supreme Court concerning contract law.

== Background ==
When John Salsbury was helping to establish Charles City College, Northwestern Bell agreed to make a $5,000 contribution for the next three years but only made one payment. The school sued for breach of contract but the telephone company maintained the contract was unenforceable because they received no consideration for the donations.

== Decision ==
The court adopted the position of the Restatement of Contracts, Second that charitable subscriptions can be enforced even without consideration or detrimental reliance.
