= Lingenfelder v. Wainwright Brewing Co. =

Decision of the Supreme Court of Missouri

- Court: Supreme Court of Missouri
- Full case name: Lingenfelder et al., Executors, v. The Wainwright Brewing Company, Appellant
- Decided: March 17, 1891
- Citation: 15 S.W. 844; 103 Mo. 578

Court membership
- Judges sitting: James B. Gantt, Thomas Adiel Sherwood, Francis Marion Black, Theodore Brace, Shepard Barclay, John Lilburn Thomas, George Bennett McFarlane

Case opinions
- Decision by: Gantt

Keywords
- Contract law; Failure of consideration

Lingenfelder v. Wainwright Brewing Co., 15 S.W. 844 (1891), was a case decided by the Supreme Court of Missouri that held that forgoing a suit for damages for lack of performance on a contract does not constitute consideration for a modification of that contract.

== Decision ==
The defendant had contracted to design and supervise the construction of a building for the plaintiff. The defendant refused to complete the project unless he was paid more money, and instead of suing for damages the plaintiff paid the money. The court struck down the modification of the contract because it lacked consideration.
