= United States Naval Institute v. Charter Communications, Inc. =

American legal case

- Court: United States Court of Appeals for the Second Circuit
- Full case name: United States Naval Institute v. Charter Communications, Inc., and Berkley Publishing Group
- Argued: January 7, 1991
- Decided: June 18, 1991
- Citation: 936 F.2d 692

Case history
- Prior history: 875 F.2d 1044 (2d Cir. 1989)

Court membership
- Judges sitting: Amalya Lyle Kearse, Ralph K. Winter Jr., Frank Altimari

Case opinions
- Majority: Kearse, joined by a unanimous court

United States Naval Institute v. Charter Communications, Inc. is a notable contract case for discussing the extent and purpose of awarding damages in a breach of contract.

== Facts ==
United States Naval Institute ("Naval") sued Charter Communication and Berkley Publishing Group ("Berkley") in the United States District Court for the Southern District of New York for breach of an agreement concerning the publication of the paperback edition of The Hunt For Red October. Naval entered into a licensing agreement with Berkley granting Berkley the exclusive license to publish a paperback edition of The Hunt for Red October. The agreement stated that the paperback book could not be published sooner than October 1985. Consequently, Berkley shipped the paperback book to retail stores early, resulting in paperback sales beginning on September 15, 1985.

Upon learning of these sales, Naval commenced an action against Berkley. After the action was dismissed and remanded on appeal, a judgment was ultimately entered in favor of Naval. The court calculated Naval's actual damages from Berkley's pre-October publication by estimating the profits Naval would have earned from hardcover sales in September, which totaled approximately $35,000. The court also awarded Naval an additional sum referenced as Berkley's profits that were attributable to the breach. These were estimated sales to customers who would not have bought the paperback but for it being available in September. The court calculated that number to be approximately $7,700. Lastly, the court awarded Naval prejudgment interest on the actual damages award, not the profits.

Both parties appealed to the Second Circuit. Naval primarily challenged the damages received from the District Court. Naval argued that the judgment should include all of Berkley's profits from Berkley's pre-October sales totaling $724,300 as well as prejudgment interest on the profits and attorney's fees. Berkley, on the other hand, challenged Naval's recovery completely.

== Court's reasoning ==
On appeal, the court held, among other things, that Naval is only entitled to the district court's award for actual damages (approximately $35,000) and prejudgment interest, not the additional $7,700 of Berkley profits.

The court reasoned that the purpose of damages for breach of contract is to compensate the injured party for their loss, not punish the breaching party. Thus, damages are generally measured by the injured party's actual loss. The profits attributable to Berkley for the breach are not damages owed to the Naval. The Berkley profits do not define Naval's loss because the people buying the paperback book in September were likely not planning to buy the hardcover anyway. If Berkley did not breach the contract, Naval would not have expected or received any of Berkley's profits from their paperback sales.

The proper damages owed to Naval were the actual damages calculation of approximately $35,000. The court's calculation operated on the premise that but for Berkley's breach, Naval would have sold the same number of books that it did the month before. Though the evidence showed that the hardcover sales were in decline in September and the number was purely hypothetical, the court believed the uncertainty to this hypothesis was to "lay at the door of the wrongdoer" who altered the course of events. Berkley had to bear the risk of possible over-calculation.

== Impact ==
United States Naval Institute v. Charter Communications stands for the proposition that the purpose of contract damages is to put the injured party in the position they would have been if there had been no breach. Punitive damages or damages to punish the breaching party are not recoverable under notions of contract law. A court is to enforce a remedy for the injured party's loss, not the defendant's gain.
