= Jerry Kirksey =

Jerry Kirksey was the editor of Singing News magazine from its inception in 1969 through 2010. He has been involved in the Southern Gospel industry for over 45 years and was inducted in the Southern Gospel Music Hall of Fame in 2011.

== Biography ==
Jerry Kirksey was born in Panama City, Florida, United States June 13, 1940. After World War II he and his family moved back to his parents' native home of Pensacola, Florida. He attended public schools in Pensacola and graduated with the class of 1958.

Jerry began working in radio during his junior year of high school. After graduation he moved back to Panama City and worked at radio station WTHR. In March 1960 he returned to Pensacola and began working for the Florida Boys, a nationally recognized Southern Gospel quartet. His job at that time was radio promotions and office manager for the quartet. J.G. Whitfield, owner of the Florida Boys quartet, and Jerry founded the Singing News magazine in May 1969.

Jerry married Carolyn Sue Rhodes on October 1, 1967. They had their first son, Kenneth Bryan, on March 9, 1969, and their second son, Kenton Brett, on March 6, 1971.

Boone, North Carolina businessman Maurice Templeton had been advertising his Southern Gospel music cruises in Singing News for several years when he purchased the magazine from J.G. Whitfield and moved the new corporation to Boone in July 1987. Jerry continued as editor of the magazine through the changes in ownership—including the purchase by Salem Communications in January 2006—until his retirement in 2010.

Jerry was inducted into the Southern Gospel Music Association's Hall of Fame in 2011.
