= Uniform Commercial Code =

Uniform Act governing sales and transactions

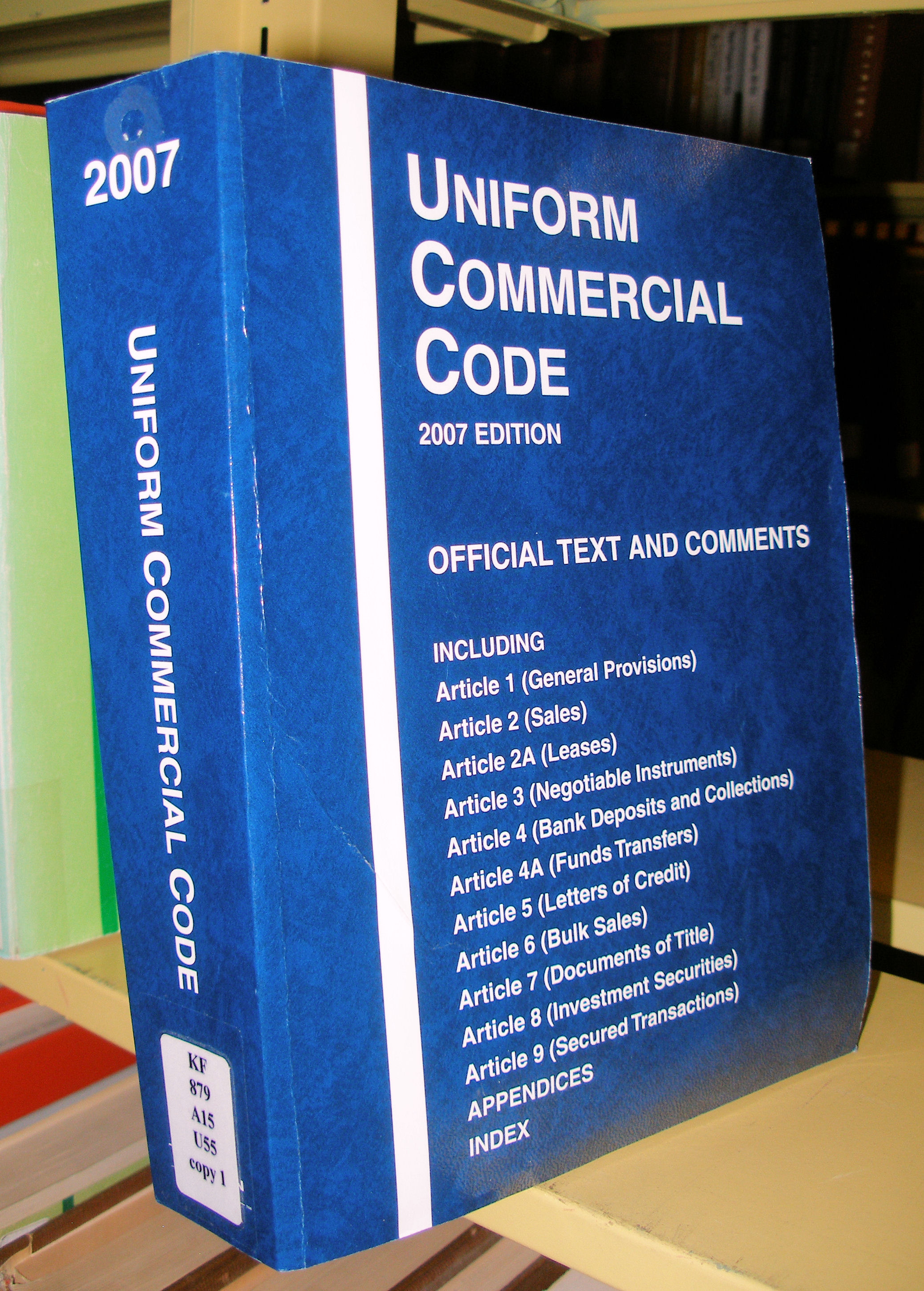
The official 2007 edition of the UCC

The Uniform Commercial Code (UCC), first published in 1952, is one of several uniform acts established as law with the goal of harmonizing the laws of sales and other commercial transactions across the United States through UCC adoption by all 50 states, the District of Columbia, and the territories of the United States.

While largely successful at achieving this ambitious goal, some U.S. jurisdictions (e.g., Louisiana and Puerto Rico) have not adopted all of the articles contained in the UCC, while other U.S. jurisdictions (e.g., American Samoa) have not adopted any articles in the UCC. Also, adoption of the UCC often varies from one U.S. jurisdiction to another. Sometimes this variation is due to alternative language found in the official UCC itself. At other times, adoption of revisions to the official UCC contributes to further variation. Additionally, some jurisdictions deviate from the official UCC by tailoring the language to meet their unique needs and preferences. Lastly, even identical language adopted by any two U.S. jurisdictions may nonetheless be subject to different statutory interpretations by each jurisdiction's courts.

== Goals ==
The goal of harmonizing state law is important because of the prevalence of commercial transactions that extend beyond one state. For example, goods may be manufactured in State A, warehoused in State B, sold from State C, and delivered in State D. The UCC achieved the goal of substantial uniformity in commercial laws and, at the same time, allowed the states the flexibility to meet local circumstances by modifying the UCC's text as enacted in each state. The UCC deals primarily with transactions involving personal property (movable property) and not real property (immovable property).

Other goals of the UCC were to modernize contract law and to allow for exceptions from the common law in contracts between merchants.

== History ==
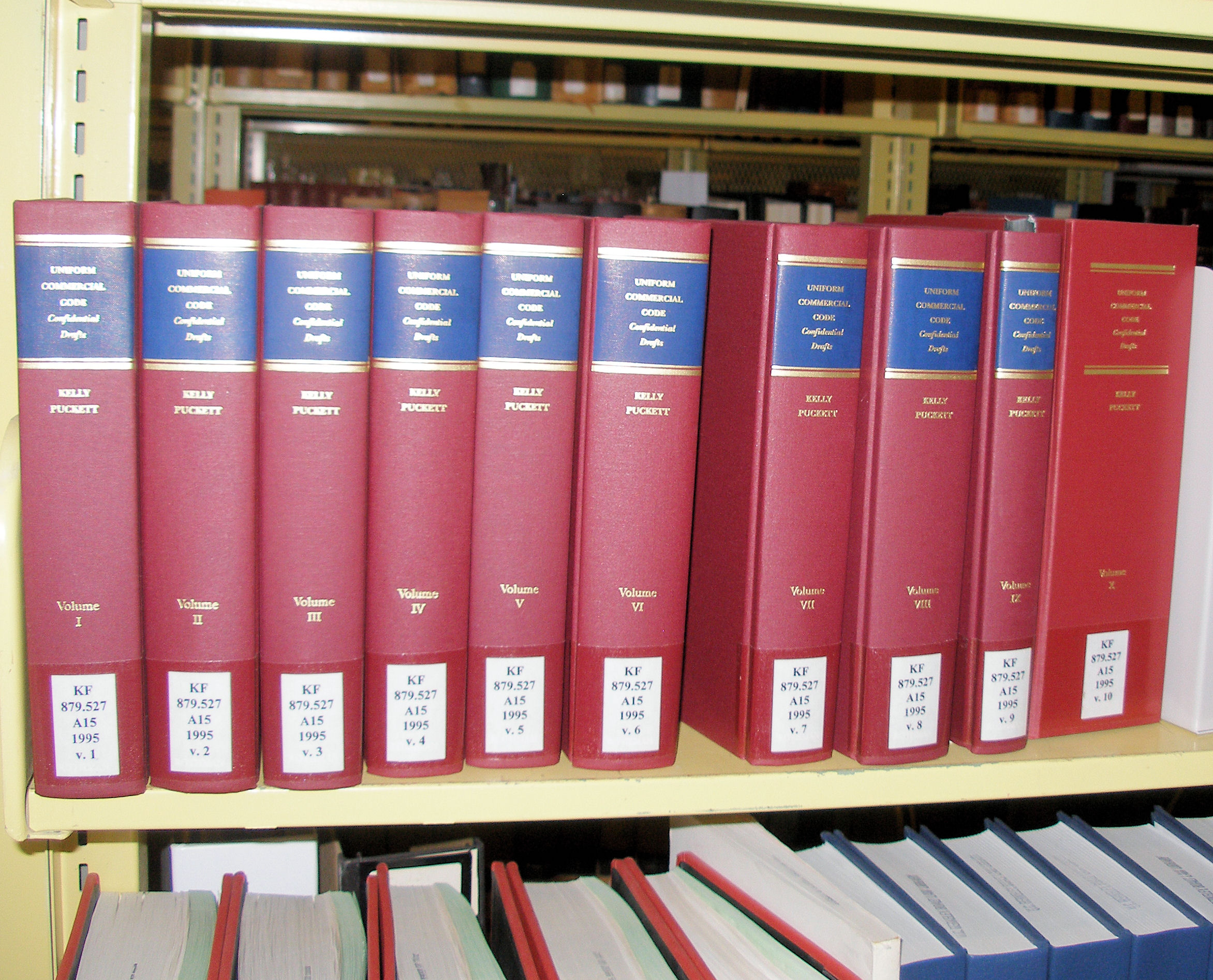
Even the confidential rough drafts of the UCC were saved and published as a 10-volume set.

In 1837, U.S. Supreme Court Justice Joseph Story opined that while most of the common law cannot be codified, the law of commercial contracts was sufficiently clear and stable. This collaboration between the American Law Institute and Uniform Law Commission has produced the longest and most elaborate of the uniform acts. NCCUSL and ALI began drafting the first version of the UCC in 1945, following earlier, less comprehensive codification efforts for areas including the sale of goods across state lines.

Judge Herbert F. Goodrich was the chairman of the editorial board of the original 1952 edition, and the Code itself was drafted by legal scholars including Karl N. Llewellyn (the prime leader in the project), William A. Schnader, Soia Mentschikoff, and Grant Gilmore. The UCC contained principles and concepts borrowed from German law, although they were unacknowledged by Llewellyn.

The Code, as the product of private organizations, is not itself the law, but only a recommendation of the laws that should be adopted in the states. Once enacted by a state, the UCC is codified into the state's code of statutes. A state may adopt the UCC verbatim as written by ALI and NCCUSL, or a state may adopt the UCC with specific changes. Unless such changes are minor, they can seriously obstruct the Code's express objective of promoting uniformity of law among the various states. Thus, persons doing business in various states must check local laws.

The ALI and NCCUSL have established a permanent editorial board for the Code. This board has issued a number of official comments and other published papers. Although these commentaries do not have the force of law, courts interpreting the Code often cite them as persuasive authority in determining the effect of one or more provisions. Courts interpreting the Code generally seek to harmonize their interpretations with those of other states that have adopted the same or a similar provision.

In one or another of its several revisions, the UCC has been fully enacted (Note: See Uniform Commercial Code adoption for more information on the adoption of each article in the UCC by U.S. jurisdictions.) with only minimal changes in 49 states, as well as in the District of Columbia, Guam, the Northern Mariana Islands, and the U.S. Virgin Islands. Louisiana, and Puerto Rico have enacted most of the provisions of the UCC with only minimal changes, except Articles 2 and 2A, preferring instead to maintain their own civil law tradition for governing the sale and lease of goods. Also, some Native American tribes have adopted portions of the UCC, including the Navajo Nation, which has adopted Articles 1, 2, 3, and 9 with only minimal changes.

Although the substantive content is largely similar, some states have made structural modifications to conform to local customs. For example, Louisiana jurisprudence refers to the major subdivisions of the UCC as "chapters" instead of articles, since the term "articles" is used in that state to refer to provisions of the Louisiana Civil Code. Arkansas has a similar arrangement as the term "article" in that state's law generally refers to a subdivision of the Arkansas Constitution. In California, they are titled "divisions" instead of articles, because, in California, articles are a third- or fourth-level subdivision of a code, while divisions or parts are always the first-level subdivision. Also, California does not allow the use of hyphens in section numbers because they are reserved for referring to ranges of sections; therefore, the hyphens used in the official UCC section numbers are dropped in the California implementation.

== UCC articles ==
The 1952 Uniform Commercial Code was released after ten years of development, and revisions were made to the Code from 1952 to 2022. The Uniform Commercial Code deals with the following subjects under consecutively numbered Articles:

Art.	Title	Contents
1	General Provisions	Definitions, rules of interpretation
2	Sales	Sales of goods
2A	Leases	Leases of goods
3	Negotiable Instruments	Promissory notes and drafts (commercial paper)
4	Bank Deposits and Collections	Banks and banking, check collection process
4A	Funds Transfers	Transfers of money between banks
5	Letters of Credit	Transactions involving letters of credit
6	Bulk Transfers and Bulk Sales	Auctions and liquidations of assets
7	Warehouse Receipts, Bills of Lading and Other Documents of Title	Storage and bailment of goods
8	Investment Securities	Securities and financial assets
9	Secured Transactions	Transactions secured by security interests
12	Controllable Electronic Records (CERs)	Transactions involving digital assets

In 2003, amendments to Article 2 modernizing many aspects (as well as changes to Article 2A and Article 7) were proposed by the NCCUSL and the ALI. Because no states adopted the amendments and, due to industry opposition, none were likely to, in 2011 the sponsors withdrew the amendments. As a result, the official text of the UCC now corresponds to the law that most states have enacted.

In 1989, the National Conference of Commissioners on Uniform State Laws recommended that Article 6 of the UCC, dealing with bulk sales, be repealed as obsolete. Approximately 45 states have done so. Two others have followed the alternative recommendation of revising Article 6.

A major revision of Article 9, dealing primarily with transactions in which personal property is used as security for a loan or extension of credit, was enacted in all states. The revision had a uniform effective date of July 1, 2001, though in a few states it went into effect shortly after that date. In 2010, NCCUSL and the ALI proposed modest amendments to Article 9. Several states have already enacted these amendments, which have a uniform effective date of July 1, 2013.

The controversy surrounding with what is now termed the Uniform Computer Information Transactions Act (UCITA) originated in the process of revising Article 2 of the UCC. The provisions of what is now UCITA were originally meant to be "Article 2B" on Licenses within a revised Article 2 on Sales. As the UCC is the only uniform law that is a joint project of NCCUSL and the ALI, both associations must agree to any revision of the UCC (i.e., the model act; revisions to the law of a particular state only require enactment in that state). The proposed final draft of Article 2B met with controversy within the ALI, and as a consequence the ALI did not grant its assent. The NCCUSL responded by renaming Article 2B and promulgating it as the UCITA. As of October 12, 2004, only Maryland and Virginia had adopted UCITA.

The overriding philosophy of the Uniform Commercial Code is to allow people to make the contracts they want, but to fill in any missing provisions where the agreements they make are silent. The law also seeks to impose uniformity and streamlining of routine transactions such as the processing of checks, notes, and other routine commercial paper. The law frequently distinguishes between merchants, who customarily deal in a commodity and are presumed to know well the business they are in, and consumers, who are not.

The UCC also seeks to discourage the use of legal formalities in making business contracts, in order to allow business to move forward without the intervention of lawyers or the preparation of elaborate documents. This last point is perhaps the most questionable part of its underlying philosophy; many in the legal profession have argued that legal formalities discourage litigation by requiring some kind of ritual that provides a clear dividing line that tells people when they have made a final deal over which they could be sued.

== Article 2 ==
Article 2 deals with sales, and Article 2A deals with leases.

=== Contract formation ===
- Firm offers (offers to buy or sell goods and promising to keep the offer open for a period of time) are valid without consideration if signed by the offeror, and are irrevocable for the time stated on the purchase order (but no longer than three months), or, if no time is stated, for a reasonable time.
- An offer to buy goods for "prompt shipment" invites acceptance by either prompt shipment or a prompt promise to ship. Therefore, this offer is not strictly unilateral. However, this "acceptance by performance" does not even have to be by conforming goods (for example, incomplete sets).
- Consideration—modifications without consideration may be acceptable in a contract for the sale of goods.
- Failure to state price—In a contract for the sale of goods, failure to state a price will not prevent the formation of a contract if the parties' original intent was to form a contract. A reasonable price will be determined by the court.
- Assignments—a requirements contract can be assigned, provided the quantity required by the assignee is not unreasonably disproportionate to the original quantity.

=== Contract repudiation and breach ===
- Nonconforming goods—If non-conforming goods are sent with a note of accommodation, such tender is construed as a counteroffer, and if accepted, forms a new contract and binds the buyer at previous contract price. If the seller refuses to conform and the buyer does not accept, the buyer must return all non-conforming goods at sellers expense within 30 days of receipt.
- Perfect tender—The buyer however does have a right of "perfect tender" and can accept all, reject all, or accept conforming goods and reject the rest; within a reasonable time after delivery but before acceptance, he must notify the seller of the rejection. If the buyer does not give a specific reason (defect), he cannot rely on the reason later, in legal proceedings (akin to the cure before cover rationale). Also, the contract is not breached per se if the seller delivered the non-conforming goods, however offensive, before the date of performance has hit.
- "Reasonable time/good faith", four weeks' minimum lead time, standard—Such standard is required from a party to a contract indefinite as to time, or made indefinite by waiver of original provisions.
- Requirements/Output contracts—The UCC provides protection against disproportionate demands, but must meet the "good faith" requirement.
- Reasonable grounds for insecurity—In a situation with a threat of non-performance, the other part may suspend its own performance and demand assurances in writing. If assurance is not provided "within a reasonable time not exceeding 30 days", the contract is repudiated.
- Battle of forms—New terms will be incorporated into the agreement unless:
  - the offer is limited to its own terms,
  - they materially alter the original terms (limit liability etc.),
  - the first party objects to new terms in a timely manner, or the first party has already objected to new terms. Whether the new terms "materially alter" the original offer may depend on the nature of the item (e.g. a delay in delivery of nails is not the same as for fish).
- Battle of forms—A written confirmation of an offer sent within a reasonable time operates as an acceptance even though it states terms that are additional to or different from those offered, unless acceptance is expressly made conditional to the additions.
- Statute of frauds as applicable to the sale of goods—The actual contract does not need to be in writing. Just some note or memo must be in writing and signed. However, the UCC exception to the signature requirement is where written confirmation is received and not objected to within 10 days.
- Cure/cover—The buyer must give the seller time to cure the defective shipment before seeking cover.
- FOB place of business—The seller assumes risk of loss until the goods are placed on a carrier. FOB destination: the seller assumes risk of loss until the shipment arrives at its destination. If the contract leaves out the delivery place, it is the seller's place of business.
- Risk of loss—Equitable conversion does not apply. In the sale of specific goods, the risk of loss lies with the seller until tender. Generally, the seller bears risk of loss until the buyer takes physical possession of the goods (the opposite of realty).
- Reclamation—Successful reclamation of goods excludes all other remedies with respect to the goods. The seller can reclaim goods upon demand within 20 days after the buyer receives them if the seller discovers that the buyer received the goods while insolvent.
- Rightfully rejected goods—A merchant buyer may follow reasonable instructions of the seller to reject the goods. If no such instructions are given, the buyer may make a reasonable effort to sell them, and the buyer/bailee is entitled to 10% of the gross proceeds.
- Implied warranty of fitness—Implied warranty of fitness arises when the seller knows the buyer is relying upon the seller's expertise in choosing goods. Implied warranty of merchantability: every sale of goods fit for ordinary purposes. Express warranties: arise from any statement of fact of promise.
- UCC damages for repudiating/breaching seller—Difference between 1) the market price when the buyer learned of breach and the 2) contract price 3) plus incidental damages. An aggrieved seller simply suing for the contract price is economically inefficient.
- Specially manufactured goods—Specially manufactured goods are exempt from statute of frauds where manufacturer has made a "substantial beginning" or "commitments for the procurement" of supplies.

=== Section 2-207: Battle of the forms ===
One of the most confusing and fiercely litigated sections of the UCC is Section 2-207, which Professor Grant Gilmore called "arguably the greatest statutory mess of all time". It governs a "battle of the forms" as to whose boilerplate terms, those of the offeror or the offeree, will survive a commercial transaction where multiple forms with varying terms are exchanged. This problem frequently arises when parties to a commercial transaction exchange routine documents like requests for proposals, invoices, purchase orders, and order confirmations, all of which may contain conflicting boilerplate provisions.

The first step in the analysis is to determine whether the UCC or the common law governs the transaction. If the UCC governs, courts will usually try to find which form constitutes the offer. Next, the offeree's acceptance forms bearing the different terms is examined. One should note whether the acceptance is expressly conditional on its own terms. If it is expressly conditional, it is a counteroffer, not an acceptance. If performance is accepted after the counteroffer, even without express acceptance, under 2-207(3), a contract will exist under only those terms on which the parties agree, together with UCC gap-fillers.

If the acceptance form does not expressly limit acceptance to its own terms, and both parties are merchants, the offeror's acceptance of the offeree's performance, though the offeree's forms contain additional or different terms, forms a contract. At this point, if the offeree's terms cannot coexist with the offeror's terms, both terms are "knocked out" and UCC gap-fillers step in. If the offeree's terms are simply additional, they will be considered part of the contract unless (a) the offeror expressly limits acceptance to the terms of the original offer, (b) the new terms materially alter the original offer, or (c) notification of objection to the new terms has already been given or is given within a reasonable time after they are promulgated by the offeree.

Because of the massive confusion engendered by Section 2-207, a revised version was promulgated in 2003, but the revision has never been enacted by any state.

== Article 8 ==
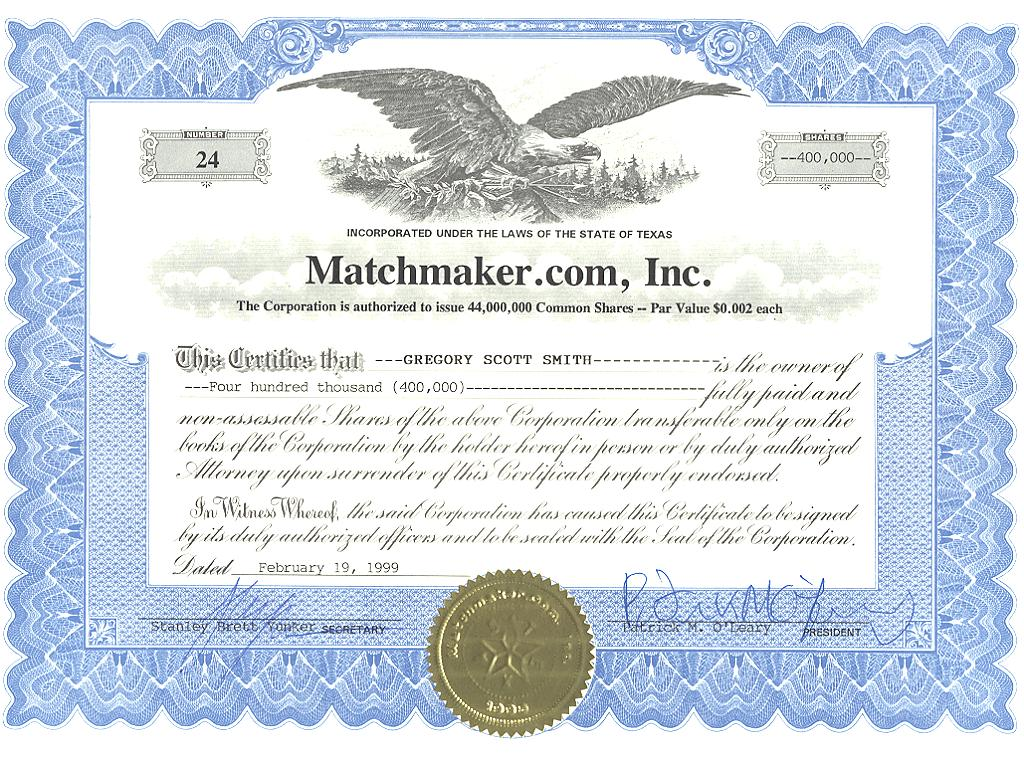
A stock certificate, as distinct from a dematerialized interest in a security

The ownership of securities is governed by Article 8 of the Uniform Commercial Code (UCC). This Article 8, a text of about 30 pages, underwent important recasting in 1994. That update of the UCC treats the majority of the transfers of interests in securities as transfers of interests in securities entitlements in issues held primarily by two American central securities depositories, respectively The Depository Trust Company (DTC) primarily for securities issued by corporations and the Federal Reserve for securities issued by the U.S. Treasury Department. In this centralised intermediated system, the title transfer of the interests in the securities to the investor does not take place at the time of the registration of shares in the issue with the issuer's registrar for the investor, but rather within the intermediated systems custodied and managed by DTC or by the Federal Reserve.

This centralization is not accompanied by a centralized register of the beneficial owner investors/owners of the securities, such as in the systems established in Sweden and in Finland (so-called "transparent systems"). Neither DTC nor the Federal Reserve hold an individual register of the transfers of interests in securities entitlements reflecting beneficial owners. The consequence is that there is an intermediated holding system for the holding of interests in the securities entitlements. Each link in the chain is composed respectively of an account provider (or intermediary) and of an account holder.

The rights created through these links are contractual claims: these rights are of two kinds:

1. For the links where the account holder is itself an account provider at a lower tier, the right on the security during the time where it is credited there is characterized as a "securities entitlement", which is an "ad hoc" concept invented in 1994: e.g., designating a claim that will enable the account holder to take part to a prorate distribution.
2. For each link of the chain, in which the final account holder is at the same time the final investor, its "security entitlement" is enriched by the "substantial" rights defined by the issuer: the right to receive, ultimately, as passed down from those holding above it, dividends or interests and, possibly, the right to take part in the general meetings, when that was laid down in the account agreement concluded with the account provider. This is characterised by article 8 of the UCC as a "beneficial interest".

This decomposition of the rights organized by Article 8 of the UCC results in preventing the investor to revindicate the security in case of bankruptcy of the account provider, that is to say the possibility to claim the security as its own asset, without being obliged to share it at its prorate value with the other creditors of the account provider. As a consequence, it also prevents the investor from asserting its securities at the upper level of the holding chain, either up to DTC or up to a sub-custodian. Such a "security entitlement," unlike a normal ownership right, is no longer enforceable "erga omnes" to any person supposed to have the security in its custody. The "security entitlement" is a relative right, therefore a contractual right.

This re-characterization of the proprietary right into a simple contractual right may enable the account provider to "re-use" the security without having to ask for the authorization of the investor. This is especially possible within the framework of temporary operations such as security lending, option to repurchase, buy to sell back or repurchase agreement. This system the distinction between the downward holding chain which traces the way in which the security was subscribed by the investor and the horizontal and ascending chains which trace the way in which the security has been transferred or sub-deposited.

Contrary to claims suggesting that Article 8 denies American investors their security rights held through intermediaries such as banks, Article 8 has also helped US negotiators during the negotiations of the Geneva Securities Convention, also known as the Unidroit Convention on Substantive Rules for Intermediated Securities.

== Article 9 ==
Article 9 governs security interests in personal property as collateral to secure a debt. A creditor with a security interest is called a secured party.

Fundamental concepts under Article 9 include how a security interest is created (called attachment); how to give notice of a security interest to the public, which makes the security interest enforceable against others who may claim an interest in the collateral (called perfection); when multiple claims to the same collateral exist, determining which interests prevail over others (called priority); and what remedies a secured party has if the debtor defaults in payment or performance of the secured obligation.

Article 9 does not govern security interests in real property, except fixtures to real property. Security interests in real property include mortgages, deeds of trusts, and installment land contracts. There may be significant legal issues around security interests in bitcoin.

The obligee which is the debtor shall return all assets stated in the collateral to secured party after the perfection of default by secured party in response to protest by the Obligee within specified time frame in the civil code and UCC Article 9-3.

The Model Tribal Secured Transactions Act (MTSTA) is a model act written by the Uniform Law Commission (ULC) and tailored to provide Native American tribes with a legal system to govern secured transactions in Indian country. It was derived from the UCC, primarily Article 9.

== Article 12: Controllable Electronic Records ==
Article 12 is a recent addition to the UCC, introduced as part of the 2022 UCC Amendments to accommodate digital assets and blockchain technology in commercial transactions. The amendments were approved by the American Law Institute (ALI) in May 2022 and the Uniform Law Commission (ULC) in July 2022, and are being progressively adopted across U.S. states.

Article 12 creates a new category of personal property called "controllable electronic records" (CERs), defined as "a record stored in an electronic medium that can be subjected to control." This definition has three essential components: (1) "Record" - information that is stored in a medium and retrievable in perceivable form; (2) "Electronic" - technology having electrical, digital, magnetic, wireless, optical, electromagnetic, or similar capabilities; and (3) "Control" - the ability to avail oneself of substantially all the benefit from the electronic record, prevent others from availing themselves of substantially all the benefit, and transfer both previous powers to another person. The concept of control is central to Article 12 and functions similarly to possession of tangible goods in traditional property law.

Article 12 establishes several key principles for CERs. First, in terms of transfer of rights, a purchaser of a CER acquires all rights that the transferor had or had power to transfer. Second, under the "take-free rule," a "qualifying purchaser" (one who obtains control of a CER for value, in good faith, and without notice of competing claims) takes the CER free from any property claims held by third parties. Third, regarding use as collateral, security interests in CERs can be perfected either by filing a financing statement or by taking control of the CER, with control-based perfection having priority over filing-based perfection.

Article 12 also introduces two important concepts that enable tokenization of payment rights. "Controllable accounts" are rights to payment for goods or services that are evidenced by a CER, where the obligor agrees to pay the person who controls that CER. "Controllable payment intangibles" are general intangibles under which the principal obligation is monetary payment, evidenced by a CER, where the obligor agrees to pay whoever controls that CER. Both of these innovations allow for the creation of digital assets that legally represent rights to payment, making possible assets like "debt tokens" that can represent claims in bankruptcy proceedings.

Article 12 represents a significant evolution in U.S. commercial law, moving away from traditional common law categories like "choses in possession" and "choses in action" toward a more functional approach that prioritizes alignment with market practices. It provides a legal framework for digital assets that directly addresses the challenges of ownership, transfer, and financing of blockchain-based assets. The creation of this new category addresses longstanding uncertainty in the legal status of digital assets, particularly cryptocurrencies, NFTs, and other blockchain-based tokens. Rather than trying to fit these novel assets into traditional property categories, Article 12 creates a new framework specifically designed for their unique characteristics.

== International influence ==
Certain portions of the UCC have been highly influential outside of the United States. Article 2 had some influence on the drafting of the United Nations Convention on Contracts for the International Sale of Goods (CISG), though the result departed from the UCC in many respects (such as refusing to adopt the mailbox rule). Article 5, governing letters of credit, has been influential in international trade finance simply because so many major financial institutions operate in New York. Article 9, which established a unified framework for security interests in personal property, directly inspired the enactment of Personal Property Security Acts in every Canadian province and territory except Quebec from 1990 onwards. This was followed by New Zealand's Personal Property Securities Act 1999 and the Australian Personal Property Securities Act of 2009.

== See also ==
- UCC-1 financing statement
- UCC Insurance
- Uniform Commercial Code adoption
- United States contract law
- United Nations Convention on Contracts for the International Sale of Goods (CISG)
- Convention on the Limitation Period in the International Sale of Goods
- Incoterms
- Certified Commercial Contracts Manager (CCCM) professional certification in contract management offered by the National Contract Management Association (NCMA) and specifically covering the UCC

== Sources ==
- Malcolm, Walter D. (January 1963). "The Uniform Commercial Code in the United States". International and Comparative Law Quarterly. 12 (1): 226–246. doi:10.1093/iclqaj/12.1.226. ISSN 0020-5893.
