= Uniform Commercial Code adoption =

The Uniform Commercial Code (UCC) currently consists of the following articles:

- Art. 1, General Provisions
- Art. 2, Sales
- Art. 2A, Leases
- Art. 3, Negotiable Instruments
- Art. 4, Bank Deposits and Collections
- Art. 4A, Funds Transfer
- Art. 5, Letters of Credit
- Art. 6, Bulk Sales (now deprecated)
- Art. 7, Documents of Title
- Art. 8, Investment Securities
- Art. 9, Secured Transactions
- Art. 12, Controllable Electronic Records

These articles have been adopted to varying degrees in the United States (U.S.) by the 50 states, District of Columbia, territories, and some Native American tribes.

== UCC adoption summary ==
The following table identifies which articles in the UCC each U.S. jurisdiction has currently adopted. However, it does not make any distinctions for the various official revisions to the UCC, the selection of official alternative language offered in the UCC, or unofficial changes made to the UCC by some jurisdictions.

UCC adoption summary
Jurisdiction	Art. 1	Art. 2	Art. 2A	Art. 3	Art. 4	Art. 4A	Art. 5	Art. 6	Art. 7	Art. 8	Art. 9	Art. 12
Alabama	Yes (Note: Art. 1: Ala. Code § 7-1-101 et seq.)	Yes (Note: Art. 2: Ala. Code § 7-2-101 et seq.)	Yes (Note: Art. 2A: Ala. Code § 7-2A-101 et seq.)	Yes (Note: Art. 3: Ala. Code § 7-3-101 et seq.)	Yes (Note: Art. 4: Ala. Code § 7-4-101 et seq.)	Yes (Note: Art. 4A: Ala. Code § 7-4A-101 et seq.)	Yes (Note: Art. 5: Ala. Code § 7-5-101 et seq.)	No	Yes (Note: Art. 7: Ala. Code § 7-7-101 et seq.)	Yes (Note: Art. 8: Ala. Code § 7-8-101 et seq.)	Yes (Note: Art. 9: Ala. Code § 7-9A-101 et seq.)	Yes (Note: Art. 12: Ala. Code § 7-12-101 et seq.)
Alaska	Yes (Note: Art. 1: Alaska Stat. § 45.01.111 et seq.)	Yes (Note: Art. 2: Alaska Stat. § 45.02.101 et seq.)	Yes (Note: Art. 2A: Alaska Stat. § 45.12.101 et seq.)	Yes (Note: Art. 3: Alaska Stat. § 45.03.101 et seq.)	Yes (Note: Art. 4: Alaska Stat. § 45.04.101 et seq.)	Yes (Note: Art. 4A: Alaska Stat. § 45.14.101 et seq.)	Yes (Note: Art. 5: Alaska Stat. § 45.05.101 et seq.)	No	Yes (Note: Art. 7: Alaska Stat. § 45.07.111 et seq.)	Yes (Note: Art. 8: Alaska Stat. § 45.08.101 et seq.)	Yes (Note: Art. 9: Alaska Stat. § 45.29.101 et seq.)	No
American Samoa	No	No	No	No	No	No	No	No	No	No	No	No
Arizona	Yes (Note: Art. 1: Ariz. Rev. Stat. § 47-1101 et seq.)	Yes (Note: Art. 2: Ariz. Rev. Stat. § 47-2101 et seq.)	Yes (Note: Art. 2A: Ariz. Rev. Stat. § 47-2A101 et seq.)	Yes (Note: Art. 3: Ariz. Rev. Stat. § 47-3101 et seq.)	Yes (Note: Art. 4: Ariz. Rev. Stat. § 47-4101 et seq.)	Yes (Note: Art. 4A: Ariz. Rev. Stat. § 47-4A101 et seq.)	Yes (Note: Art. 5: Ariz. Rev. Stat. § 47-5101 et seq.)	No	Yes (Note: Art. 7: Ariz. Rev. Stat. § 47-7101 et seq.)	Yes (Note: Art. 8: Ariz. Rev. Stat. § 47-8101 et seq.)	Yes (Note: Art. 9: Ariz. Rev. Stat. § 47-9101 et seq.)	No
Arkansas	Yes (Note: Art. 1: Ark. Code Ann. § 4-1-101 et seq.)	Yes (Note: Art. 2: Ark. Code Ann. § 4-2-101 et seq.)	Yes (Note: Art. 2A: Ark. Code Ann. § 4-2A-101 et seq.)	Yes (Note: Art. 3: Ark. Code Ann. § 4-3-101 et seq.)	Yes (Note: Art. 4: Ark. Code Ann. § 4-4-101 et seq.)	Yes (Note: Art. 4A: Ark. Code Ann. § 4-4A-101 et seq.)	Yes (Note: Art. 5: Ark. Code Ann. § 4-5-101 et seq.)	No	Yes (Note: Art. 7: Ark. Code Ann. § 4-7-101 et seq.)	Yes (Note: Art. 8: Ark. Code Ann. § 4-8-101 et seq.)	Yes (Note: Art. 9: Ark. Code Ann. § 4-9-101 et seq.)	No
Assiniboine and Sioux Tribes of the Fort Peck Indian Reservation	Yes (Note: Art. 1: Fort Peck Tribes Comprehensive Code of Justice tit. 24, § 101 et seq.)	Yes (Note: Art. 2: Fort Peck Tribes Comprehensive Code of Justice tit. 24, § 201 et seq. (adopting U.C.C. § 2-101 et seq.).)	No	Yes (Note: Art. 3: Fort Peck Tribes Comprehensive Code of Justice tit. 24, § 301 et seq. (adopting U.C.C. § 3-101 et seq.).)	Yes (Note: Art. 4: Fort Peck Tribes Comprehensive Code of Justice tit. 24, § 401 et seq. (adopting U.C.C. § 4-101 et seq.).)	No	Yes (Note: Art. 5: Fort Peck Tribes Comprehensive Code of Justice tit. 24, § 501 et seq. (adopting U.C.C. § 5-101 et seq.).)	Maybe (Note: Art. 6: Fort Peck Tribes Comprehensive Code of Justice tit. 24, § 601 et seq. (adopting U.C.C. § 6-101 et seq.).)	Yes (Note: Art. 7: Fort Peck Tribes Comprehensive Code of Justice tit. 24, § 701 et seq. (adopting U.C.C. § 7-101 et seq.).)	No	Yes (Note: Art. 9: Fort Peck Tribes Comprehensive Code of Justice tit. 24, § 901 et seq. (adopting U.C.C. § 9-101 et seq.).)	No
California	Yes (Note: Art. 1: Cal. Com. Code § 1101 et seq.)	Yes (Note: Art. 2: Cal. Com. Code § 2101 et seq.)	Yes (Note: Art. 2A: Cal. Com. Code § 10101 et seq.)	Yes (Note: Art. 3: Cal. Com. Code § 3101 et seq.)	Yes (Note: Art. 4: Cal. Com. Code § 4101 et seq.)	Yes (Note: Art. 4A: Cal. Com. Code § 11101 et seq.)	Yes (Note: Art. 5: Cal. Com. Code § 5101 et seq.)	Yes (Note: Art. 6: Cal. Com. Code § 6101 et seq.)	Yes (Note: Art. 7: Cal. Com. Code § 7101 et seq.)	Yes (Note: Art. 8: Cal. Com. Code § 8101 et seq.)	Yes (Note: Art. 9: Cal. Com. Code § 9101 et seq.)	Yes (Note: Art. 12: Cal. Com. Code § 12101 et seq.)
Cherokee Nation	Yes (Note: Art. 1: Cherokee Nation Code tit. 80, § 1-101 et seq.)	Yes (Note: Art. 2: Cherokee Nation Code tit. 80, § 2-101 et seq.)	No	Yes (Note: Art. 3: Cherokee Nation Code tit. 80, § 3-101 et seq.)	Yes (Note: Art. 4: Cherokee Nation Code tit. 80, § 4-101 et seq.)	No	Yes (Note: Art. 5: Cherokee Nation Code tit. 80, § 5-101 et seq.)	No	Yes (Note: Art. 7: Cherokee Nation Code tit. 80, § 7-101 et seq.)	Yes (Note: Art. 8: Cherokee Nation Code tit. 80, § 8-101 et seq.)	Yes (Note: Art. 9: Cherokee Nation Code tit. 80, § 9-101 et seq.)	No
Colorado	Yes (Note: Art. 1: Colo. Rev. Stat. § 4-1-101 et seq.)	Yes (Note: Art. 2: Colo. Rev. Stat. § 4-2-101 et seq.)	Yes (Note: Art. 2A: Colo. Rev. Stat. § 4-2.5-101 et seq.)	Yes (Note: Art. 3: Colo. Rev. Stat. § 4-3-101 et seq.)	Yes (Note: Art. 4: Colo. Rev. Stat. § 4-4-101 et seq.)	Yes (Note: Art. 4A: Colo. Rev. Stat. § 4-4.5-101 et seq.)	Yes (Note: Art. 5: Colo. Rev. Stat. § 4-5-101 et seq.)	No	Yes (Note: Art. 7: Colo. Rev. Stat. § 4-7-101 et seq.)	Yes (Note: Art. 8: Colo. Rev. Stat. § 4-8-101 et seq.)	Yes (Note: Art. 9: Colo. Rev. Stat. § 4-9-101 et seq.)	Yes (Note: Art. 12: Colo. Rev. Stat. § 4-12-101 et seq.)
Connecticut	Yes (Note: Art. 1: Conn. Gen. Stat. § 42a-1-101 et seq.)	Yes (Note: Art. 2: Conn. Gen. Stat. § 42a-2-101 et seq.)	Yes (Note: Art. 2A: Conn. Gen. Stat. § 42a-2A-101 et seq.)	Yes (Note: Art. 3: Conn. Gen. Stat. § 42a-3-101 et seq.)	Yes (Note: Art. 4: Conn. Gen. Stat. § 42a-4-101 et seq.)	Yes (Note: Art. 4A: Conn. Gen. Stat. § 42a-4A-101 et seq.)	Yes (Note: Art. 5: Conn. Gen. Stat. § 42a-5-101 et seq.)	No	Yes (Note: Art. 7: Conn. Gen. Stat. § 42a-7-101 et seq.)	Yes (Note: Art. 8: Conn. Gen. Stat. § 42a-8-101 et seq.)	Yes (Note: Art. 9: Conn. Gen. Stat. § 42a-9-101 et seq.)	No
Crow Tribe of Montana	Yes (Note: Art. 1: Crow Law and Order Code § 15.2.1-101 et seq.)	No	No	No	No	No	No	No	No	No	Yes (Note: Art. 9: Crow Law and Order Code § 15.2.9-101 et seq.)	No
Delaware	Yes (Note: Art. 1: Del. Code Ann. tit. 6, § 1-101 et seq.)	Yes (Note: Art. 2: Del. Code Ann. tit. 6, § 2-101 et seq.)	Yes (Note: Art. 2A: Del. Code Ann. tit. 6, § 2A-101 et seq.)	Yes (Note: Art. 3: Del. Code Ann. tit. 6, § 3-101 et seq.)	Yes (Note: Art. 4: Del. Code Ann. tit. 6, § 4-101 et seq.)	Yes (Note: Art. 4A: Del. Code Ann. tit. 6, § 4A-101 et seq.)	Yes (Note: Art. 5: Del. Code Ann. tit. 6, § 5-101 et seq.)	No	Yes (Note: Art. 7: Del. Code Ann. tit. 6, § 7-101 et seq.)	Yes (Note: Art. 8: Del. Code Ann. tit. 6, § 8-101 et seq.)	Yes (Note: Art. 9: Del. Code Ann. tit. 6, § 9-101 et seq.)	Yes (Note: Art. 12: Del. Code Ann. tit. 6, § 12-101 et seq.)
District of Columbia	Yes (Note: Art. 1: D.C. Code § 28:1-101 et seq.)	Yes (Note: Art. 2: D.C. Code § 28:2-101 et seq.)	Yes (Note: Art. 2A: D.C. Code § 28:2A-101 et seq.)	Yes (Note: Art. 3: D.C. Code § 28:3-101 et seq.)	Yes (Note: Art. 4: D.C. Code § 28:4-101 et seq.)	Yes (Note: Art. 4A: D.C. Code § 28:4A-101 et seq.)	Yes (Note: Art. 5: D.C. Code § 28:5-101 et seq.)	No	Yes (Note: Art. 7: D.C. Code § 28:7-101 et seq.)	Yes (Note: Art. 8: D.C. Code § 28:8-101 et seq.)	Yes (Note: Art. 9: D.C. Code § 28:9-101 et seq.)	No
Florida	Yes (Note: Art. 1: Fla. Stat. § 671.101 et seq.)	Yes (Note: Art. 2: Fla. Stat. § 672.101 et seq.)	Yes (Note: Art. 2A: Fla. Stat. § 680.1011 et seq.)	Yes (Note: Art. 3: Fla. Stat. § 673.1011 et seq.)	Yes (Note: Art. 4: Fla. Stat. § 674.101 et seq.)	Yes (Note: Art. 4A: Fla. Stat. § 670.101 et seq.)	Yes (Note: Art. 5: Fla. Stat. § 675.101 et seq.)	No	Yes (Note: Art. 7: Fla. Stat. § 677.101 et seq.)	Yes (Note: Art. 8: Fla. Stat. § 678.1011 et seq.)	Yes (Note: Art. 9: Fla. Stat. § 679.1011 et seq.)	No
Georgia	Yes (Note: Art. 1: Ga. Code Ann. § 11-1-101 et seq.)	Yes (Note: Art. 2: Ga. Code Ann. § 11-2-101 et seq.)	Yes (Note: Art. 2A: Ga. Code Ann. § 11-2A-101 et seq.)	Yes (Note: Art. 3: Ga. Code Ann. § 11-3-101 et seq.)	Yes (Note: Art. 4: Ga. Code Ann. § 11-4-101 et seq.)	Yes (Note: Art. 4A: Ga. Code Ann. § 11-4A-101 et seq.)	Yes (Note: Art. 5: Ga. Code Ann. § 11-5-101 et seq.)	No	Yes (Note: Art. 7: Ga. Code Ann. § 11-7-101 et seq.)	Yes (Note: Art. 8: Ga. Code Ann. § 11-8-101 et seq.)	Yes (Note: Art. 9: Ga. Code Ann. § 11-9-101 et seq.)	No
Guam	Yes (Note: Art. 1: 13 Guam Code Ann. § 1101 et seq.)	Yes (Note: Art. 2: 13 Guam Code Ann. § 2101 et seq.)	No	Yes (Note: Art. 3: 13 Guam Code Ann. § 3101 et seq.)	Yes (Note: Art. 4: 13 Guam Code Ann. § 4101 et seq.)	No	Yes (Note: Art. 5: 13 Guam Code Ann. § 5101 et seq.)	Yes (Note: Art. 6: 13 Guam Code Ann. § 6101 et seq.)	Yes (Note: Art. 7: 13 Guam Code Ann. § 7101 et seq.)	Yes (Note: Art. 8: 13 Guam Code Ann. § 8101 et seq.)	Yes (Note: Art. 9: 13 Guam Code Ann. § 9101 et seq.)	No
Hawaii	Yes (Note: Art. 1: Haw. Rev. Stat. § 490:1-101 et seq.)	Yes (Note: Art. 2: Haw. Rev. Stat. § 490:2-101 et seq.)	Yes (Note: Art. 2A: Haw. Rev. Stat. § 490:2A-101 et seq.)	Yes (Note: Art. 3: Haw. Rev. Stat. § 490:3-101 et seq.)	Yes (Note: Art. 4: Haw. Rev. Stat. § 490:4-101 et seq.)	Yes (Note: Art. 4A: Haw. Rev. Stat. § 490:4A-101 et seq.)	Yes (Note: Art. 5: Haw. Rev. Stat. § 490:5-101 et seq.)	No	Yes (Note: Art. 7: Haw. Rev. Stat. § 490:6-101 et seq.)	Yes (Note: Art. 8: Haw. Rev. Stat. § 490:7-101 et seq.)	Yes (Note: Art. 9: Haw. Rev. Stat. § 490:8-101 et seq.)	Yes (Note: Art. 12: Haw. Rev. Stat. § 490:A-101 et seq.)
Idaho	Yes (Note: Art. 1: Idaho Code § 28-1-101 et seq.)	Yes (Note: Art. 2: Idaho Code § 28-2-101 et seq.)	Yes (Note: Art. 2A: Idaho Code § 28-12-101 et seq.)	Yes (Note: Art. 3: Idaho Code § 28-3-101 et seq.)	Yes (Note: Art. 4: Idaho Code § 28-4-101 et seq.)	Yes (Note: Art. 4A: Idaho Code § 28-4-601 et seq.)	Yes (Note: Art. 5: Idaho Code § 28-5-101 et seq.)	No	Yes (Note: Art. 7: Idaho Code § 28-7-101 et seq.)	Yes (Note: Art. 8: Idaho Code § 28-8-101 et seq.)	Yes (Note: Art. 9: Idaho Code § 28-9-101 et seq.)	No
Illinois	Yes (Note: Art. 1: 810 Ill. Comp. Stat. 5/1-101 et seq.)	Yes (Note: Art. 2: 810 Ill. Comp. Stat. 5/2-101 et seq.)	Yes (Note: Art. 2A: 810 Ill. Comp. Stat. 5/2A-101 et seq.)	Yes (Note: Art. 3: 810 Ill. Comp. Stat. 5/3-101 et seq.)	Yes (Note: Art. 4: 810 Ill. Comp. Stat. 5/4-101 et seq.)	Yes (Note: Art. 4A: 810 Ill. Comp. Stat. 5/4A-101 et seq.)	Yes (Note: Art. 5: 810 Ill. Comp. Stat. 5/5-101 et seq.)	No	Yes (Note: Art. 7: 810 Ill. Comp. Stat. 5/7-101 et seq.)	Yes (Note: Art. 8: 810 Ill. Comp. Stat. 5/8-101 et seq.)	Yes (Note: Art. 9: 810 Ill. Comp. Stat. 5/9-101 et seq.)	No
Indiana	Yes (Note: Art. 1: Ind. Code § 26-1-1-101 et seq.)	Yes (Note: Art. 2: Ind. Code § 26-1-2-101 et seq.)	Yes (Note: Art. 2A: Ind. Code § 26-1-2.1-101 et seq.)	Yes (Note: Art. 3: Ind. Code § 26-1-3.1-101 et seq.)	Yes (Note: Art. 4: Ind. Code § 26-1-4-101 et seq.)	Yes (Note: Art. 4A: Ind. Code § 26-1-4.1-101 et seq.)	Yes (Note: Art. 5: Ind. Code § 26-1-5.1-101 et seq.)	No	Yes (Note: Art. 7: Ind. Code § 26-1-7-101 et seq.)	Yes (Note: Art. 8: Ind. Code § 26-1-8.1-101 et seq.)	Yes (Note: Art. 9: Ind. Code § 26-1-9.1-101 et seq.)	Yes (Note: Art. 12: Ind. Code § 26-1-12-101 et seq.)
Iowa	Yes (Note: Art. 1: Iowa Code § 554.1101 et seq.)	Yes (Note: Art. 2: Iowa Code § 554.2101 et seq.)	Yes (Note: Art. 2A: Iowa Code § 554.13101 et seq.)	Yes (Note: Art. 3: Iowa Code § 554.3101 et seq.)	Yes (Note: Art. 4: Iowa Code § 554.4101 et seq.)	Yes (Note: Art. 4A: Iowa Code § 554.12101 et seq.)	Yes (Note: Art. 5: Iowa Code § 554.5101 et seq.)	No	Yes (Note: Art. 7: Iowa Code § 554.7101 et seq.)	Yes (Note: Art. 8: Iowa Code § 554.8101 et seq.)	Yes (Note: Art. 9: Iowa Code § 554.9101 et seq.)	No
Kansas	Yes (Note: Art. 1: Kan. Stat. Ann. § 84-1-101 et seq.)	Yes (Note: Art. 2: Kan. Stat. Ann. § 84-2-101 et seq.)	Yes (Note: Art. 2A: Kan. Stat. Ann. § 84-2a-101 et seq.)	Yes (Note: Art. 3: Kan. Stat. Ann. § 84-3-101 et seq.)	Yes (Note: Art. 4: Kan. Stat. Ann. § 84-4-101 et seq.)	Yes (Note: Art. 4A: Kan. Stat. Ann. § 84-4a-101 et seq.)	Yes (Note: Art. 5: Kan. Stat. Ann. § 84-5-101 et seq.)	No	Yes (Note: Art. 7: Kan. Stat. Ann. § 84-7-101 et seq.)	Yes (Note: Art. 8: Kan. Stat. Ann. § 84-8-101 et seq.)	Yes (Note: Art. 9: Kan. Stat. Ann. § 84-9-101 et seq.)	No
Kentucky	Yes (Note: Art. 1: Ky. Rev. Stat. Ann. § 355.1-101 et seq.)	Yes (Note: Art. 2: Ky. Rev. Stat. Ann. § 355.2-101 et seq.)	Yes (Note: Art. 2A: Ky. Rev. Stat. Ann. § 355.2A-101 et seq.)	Yes (Note: Art. 3: Ky. Rev. Stat. Ann. § 355.3-101 et seq.)	Yes (Note: Art. 4: Ky. Rev. Stat. Ann. § 355.4-101 et seq.)	Yes (Note: Art. 4A: Ky. Rev. Stat. Ann. § 355.4A-101 et seq.)	Yes (Note: Art. 5: Ky. Rev. Stat. Ann. § 355.5-101 et seq.)	No	Yes (Note: Art. 7: Ky. Rev. Stat. Ann. § 355.7-101 et seq.)	Yes (Note: Art. 8: Ky. Rev. Stat. Ann. § 355.8-101 et seq.)	Yes (Note: Art. 9: Ky. Rev. Stat. Ann. § 355.9-101 et seq.)	No
Louisiana	Yes (Note: Art. 1: La. Rev. Stat. Ann. § 10:-101 et seq.)	No	No	Yes (Note: Art. 3: La. Rev. Stat. Ann. § 10:1-101 et seq.)	Yes (Note: Art. 4: La. Rev. Stat. Ann. § 10:4-101 et seq.)	Yes (Note: Art. 4A: La. Rev. Stat. Ann. § 10:4A-101 et seq.)	Yes (Note: Art. 5: La. Rev. Stat. Ann. § 10:5-101 et seq.)	No	Yes (Note: Art. 7: La. Rev. Stat. Ann. § 10:7-101 et seq.)	Yes (Note: Art. 8: La. Rev. Stat. Ann. § 10:8-101 et seq.)	Yes (Note: Art. 9: La. Rev. Stat. Ann. § 10:9-101 et seq.)	No
Maine	Yes (Note: Art. 1: Me. Stat. tit. 11, § 1-1101 et seq.)	Yes (Note: Art. 2: Me. Stat. tit. 11, § 2-101 et seq.)	Yes (Note: Art. 2A: Me. Stat. tit. 11, § 2-1101 et seq.)	Yes (Note: Art. 3: Me. Stat. tit. 11, § 3-1101 et seq.)	Yes (Note: Art. 4: Me. Stat. tit. 11, § 4-101 et seq.)	Yes (Note: Art. 4A: Me. Stat. tit. 11, § 4-1101 et seq.)	Yes (Note: Art. 5: Me. Stat. tit. 11, § 5-1101 et seq.)	No	Yes (Note: Art. 7: Me. Stat. tit. 11, § 7-1101 et seq.)	Yes (Note: Art. 8: Me. Stat. tit. 11, § 8-1101 et seq.)	Yes (Note: Art. 9: Me. Stat. tit. 11, § 9-1101 et seq.)	No
Maryland	Yes (Note: Art. 1: Md. Code Ann., Com. Law § 1-101 et seq.)	Yes (Note: Art. 2: Md. Code Ann., Com. Law § 2-101 et seq.)	Yes (Note: Art. 2A: Md. Code Ann., Com. Law § 2A-101 et seq.)	Yes (Note: Art. 3: Md. Code Ann., Com. Law § 3-101 et seq.)	Yes (Note: Art. 4: Md. Code Ann., Com. Law § 4-101 et seq.)	Yes (Note: Art. 4A: Md. Code Ann., Com. Law § 4A-101 et seq.)	Yes (Note: Art. 5: Md. Code Ann., Com. Law § 5-101 et seq.)	Yes (Note: Art. 6: Md. Code Ann., Com. Law § 6-101 et seq.)	Yes (Note: Art. 7: Md. Code Ann., Com. Law § 7-101 et seq.)	Yes (Note: Art. 8: Md. Code Ann., Com. Law § 8-101 et seq.)	Yes (Note: Art. 9: Md. Code Ann., Com. Law § 9-101 et seq.)	No
Massachusetts	Yes (Note: Art. 1: Mass. Gen. Laws ch. 106, § 1-101 et seq.)	Yes (Note: Art. 2: Mass. Gen. Laws ch. 106, § 2-101 et seq.)	Yes (Note: Art. 2A: Mass. Gen. Laws ch. 106, § 2A-101 et seq.)	Yes (Note: Art. 3: Mass. Gen. Laws ch. 106, § 3-101 et seq.)	Yes (Note: Art. 4: Mass. Gen. Laws ch. 106, § 4-101 et seq.)	Yes (Note: Art. 4A: Mass. Gen. Laws ch. 106, § 4A-101 et seq.)	Yes (Note: Art. 5: Mass. Gen. Laws ch. 106, § 5-101 et seq.)	No	Yes (Note: Art. 7: Mass. Gen. Laws ch. 106, § 7-101 et seq.)	Yes (Note: Art. 8: Mass. Gen. Laws ch. 106, § 8-101 et seq.)	Yes (Note: Art. 9: Mass. Gen. Laws ch. 106, § 9-101 et seq.)	No
Michigan	Yes (Note: Art. 1: Mich. Comp. Laws § 440.1101 et seq.)	Yes (Note: Art. 2: Mich. Comp. Laws § 440.2101 et seq.)	Yes (Note: Art. 2A: Mich. Comp. Laws § 440.2801 et seq.)	Yes (Note: Art. 3: Mich. Comp. Laws § 440.3101 et seq.)	Yes (Note: Art. 4: Mich. Comp. Laws § 440.4101 et seq.)	Yes (Note: Art. 4A: Mich. Comp. Laws § 440.4601 et seq.)	Yes (Note: Art. 5: Mich. Comp. Laws § 440.5101 et seq.)	No	Yes (Note: Art. 7: Mich. Comp. Laws § 440.7101 et seq.)	Yes (Note: Art. 8: Mich. Comp. Laws § 440.8101 et seq.)	Yes (Note: Art. 9: Mich. Comp. Laws § 440.9101 et seq.)	No
Mille Lacs Band of Ojibwe	Yes (Note: Art. 1: Mille Lacs Band Stat. Ann. tit. 18, § 301-02 et seq. (adopting Minn. Stat. § 336.1-101 et seq.).)	Yes (Note: Art. 2: Mille Lacs Band Stat. Ann. tit. 18, § 301-02 et seq. (adopting Minn. Stat. § 336.2-101 et seq.).)	Yes (Note: Art. 2A: Mille Lacs Band Stat. Ann. tit. 18, § 301-02 et seq. (adopting Minn. Stat. § 336.2A-101 et seq.).)	Yes (Note: Art. 3: Mille Lacs Band Stat. Ann. tit. 18, § 301-02 et seq. (adopting Minn. Stat. § 336.3-101 et seq.).)	Yes (Note: Art. 4: Mille Lacs Band Stat. Ann. tit. 18, § 301-02 et seq. (adopting Minn. Stat. § 336.4-101 et seq.).)	Yes (Note: Art. 4A: Mille Lacs Band Stat. Ann. tit. 18, § 301-02 et seq. (adopting Minn. Stat. § 336.5-101 et seq.).)	Yes (Note: Art. 5: Mille Lacs Band Stat. Ann. tit. 18, § 301-02 et seq. (adopting Minn. Stat. § 336.6-101 et seq.).)	No	Yes (Note: Art. 7: Mille Lacs Band Stat. Ann. tit. 18, § 301-02 et seq. (adopting Minn. Stat. § 336.7-101 et seq.).)	Yes (Note: Art. 8: Mille Lacs Band Stat. Ann. tit. 18, § 301-02 et seq. (adopting Minn. Stat. § 336.8-101 et seq.).)	Yes (Note: Art. 9: Mille Lacs Band Stat. Ann. tit. 18, § 301-02 et seq. (adopting Minn. Stat. § 336.9-101 et seq.).)	No
Minnesota	Yes (Note: Art. 1: Minn. Stat. § 336.1-101 et seq.)	Yes (Note: Art. 2: Minn. Stat. § 336.2-101 et seq.)	Yes (Note: Art. 2A: Minn. Stat. § 336.2A-101 et seq.)	Yes (Note: Art. 3: Minn. Stat. § 336.3-101 et seq.)	Yes (Note: Art. 4: Minn. Stat. § 336.4-101 et seq.)	Yes (Note: Art. 4A: Minn. Stat. § 336.4A-101 et seq.)	Yes (Note: Art. 5: Minn. Stat. § 336.5-101 et seq.)	No	Yes (Note: Art. 7: Minn. Stat. § 336.7-101 et seq.)	Yes (Note: Art. 8: Minn. Stat. § 336.8-101 et seq.)	Yes (Note: Art. 9: Minn. Stat. § 336.9-101 et seq.)	No
Mississippi	Yes (Note: Art. 1: Miss. Code Ann. § 75-1-101 et seq.)	Yes (Note: Art. 2: Miss. Code Ann. § 75-2-101 et seq.)	Yes (Note: Art. 2A: Miss. Code Ann. § 75-2A-101 et seq.)	Yes (Note: Art. 3: Miss. Code Ann. § 75-3-101 et seq.)	Yes (Note: Art. 4: Miss. Code Ann. § 75-4-101 et seq.)	Yes (Note: Art. 4A: Miss. Code Ann. § 75-4A-101 et seq.)	Yes (Note: Art. 5: Miss. Code Ann. § 75-5-101 et seq.)	No	Yes (Note: Art. 7: Miss. Code Ann. § 75-7-101 et seq.)	Yes (Note: Art. 8: Miss. Code Ann. § 75-8-101 et seq.)	Yes (Note: Art. 9: Miss. Code Ann. § 75-9-101 et seq.)	No
Mississippi Band of Choctaw Indians	Yes (Note: Art. 1: Choctaw Tribal Code § 26-1-101 et seq.)	Yes (Note: Art. 2: Choctaw Tribal Code § 26-2-101 et seq.)	Yes (Note: Art. 2A: Choctaw Tribal Code § 26-2A-101 et seq.)	No	No	No	Yes (Note: Art. 5: Choctaw Tribal Code § 26-5-101 et seq.)	No	Yes (Note: Art. 7: Choctaw Tribal Code § 26-7-101 et seq.)	No	Yes (Note: Art. 9: Choctaw Tribal Code § 26-9-101 et seq.)	No
Missouri	Yes (Note: Art. 1: Mo. Rev. Stat. § 400.1-101 et seq.)	Yes (Note: Art. 2: Mo. Rev. Stat. § 400.2-101 et seq.)	Yes (Note: Art. 2A: Mo. Rev. Stat. § 400.2A-101 et seq.)	Yes (Note: Art. 3: Mo. Rev. Stat. § 400.3-101 et seq.)	Yes (Note: Art. 4: Mo. Rev. Stat. § 400.4-101 et seq.)	Yes (Note: Art. 4A: Mo. Rev. Stat. § 400.4A-101 et seq.)	Yes (Note: Art. 5: Mo. Rev. Stat. § 400.5-101 et seq.)	No	Yes (Note: Art. 7: Mo. Rev. Stat. § 400.7-101 et seq.)	Yes (Note: Art. 8: Mo. Rev. Stat. § 400.8-101 et seq.)	Yes (Note: Art. 9: Mo. Rev. Stat. § 400.9-101 et seq.)	No
Mohegan Indian Tribe	No	No	No	No	No	No	No	No	No	No	Yes (Note: Art. 9: Mohegan Tribe Code of Ordinances § 7-151 et seq. (adopting Conn. Gen. Stat. § 42a-9-101 et seq.).)	No
Montana	Yes (Note: Art. 1: Mont. Code Ann. § 30-1-101 et seq.)	Yes (Note: Art. 2: Mont. Code Ann. § 30-2-101 et seq.)	Yes (Note: Art. 2A: Mont. Code Ann. § 30-2A-101 et seq.)	Yes (Note: Art. 3: Mont. Code Ann. § 30-3-101 et seq.)	Yes (Note: Art. 4: Mont. Code Ann. § 30-4-101 et seq.)	Yes (Note: Art. 4A: Mont. Code Ann. § 30-4A-101 et seq.)	Yes (Note: Art. 5: Mont. Code Ann. § 30-5-101 et seq.)	No	Yes (Note: Art. 7: Mont. Code Ann. § 30-7-101 et seq.)	Yes (Note: Art. 8: Mont. Code Ann. § 30-8-101 et seq.)	Yes (Note: Art. 9: Mont. Code Ann. § 30-9A-101 et seq.)	No
Navajo Nation	Yes (Note: Art. 1: Navajo Nation Code tit. 5A, § 1-101 et seq.)	Yes (Note: Art. 2: Navajo Nation Code tit. 5A, § 2-101 et seq.)	No	Yes (Note: Art. 3: Navajo Nation Code tit. 5A, § 3-101 et seq.)	No	No	No	No	No	No	Yes (Note: Art. 9: Navajo Nation Code tit. 5A, § 9-101 et seq.)	No
Nebraska	Yes (Note: Art. 1: Neb. Rev. Stat. U.C.C. § 1-101 et seq.)	Yes (Note: Art. 2: Neb. Rev. Stat. U.C.C. § 2-101 et seq.)	Yes (Note: Art. 2A: Neb. Rev. Stat. U.C.C. § 2A-101 et seq.)	Yes (Note: Art. 3: Neb. Rev. Stat. U.C.C. § 3-101 et seq.)	Yes (Note: Art. 4: Neb. Rev. Stat. U.C.C. § 4-101 et seq.)	Yes (Note: Art. 4A: Neb. Rev. Stat. U.C.C. § 4A-101 et seq.)	Yes (Note: Art. 5: Neb. Rev. Stat. U.C.C. § 5-101 et seq.)	No	Yes (Note: Art. 7: Neb. Rev. Stat. U.C.C. § 7-101 et seq.)	Yes (Note: Art. 8: Neb. Rev. Stat. U.C.C. § 8-101 et seq.)	Yes (Note: Art. 9: Neb. Rev. Stat. U.C.C. § 9-101 et seq.)	No
Nevada	Yes (Note: Art. 1: Nev. Rev. Stat. § 104.1101 et seq.)	Yes (Note: Art. 2: Nev. Rev. Stat. § 104.2101 et seq.)	Yes (Note: Art. 2A: Nev. Rev. Stat. § 104A.2101 et seq.)	Yes (Note: Art. 3: Nev. Rev. Stat. § 104.3101 et seq.)	Yes (Note: Art. 4: Nev. Rev. Stat. § 104.4101 et seq.)	Yes (Note: Art. 4A: Nev. Rev. Stat. § 104A.4101 et seq.)	Yes (Note: Art. 5: Nev. Rev. Stat. § 104.5101 et seq.)	No	Yes (Note: Art. 7: Nev. Rev. Stat. § 104.7101 et seq.)	Yes (Note: Art. 8: Nev. Rev. Stat. § 104.8101 et seq.)	Yes (Note: Art. 9: Nev. Rev. Stat. § 104.9101 et seq.)	Yes
New Hampshire	Yes (Note: Art. 1: N.H. Rev. Stat. Ann. § 382-A:1-101: et seq.)	Yes (Note: Art. 2: N.H. Rev. Stat. Ann. § 382-A:2-101: et seq.)	Yes (Note: Art. 2A: N.H. Rev. Stat. Ann. § 382-A:2A-101: et seq.)	Yes (Note: Art. 3: N.H. Rev. Stat. Ann. § 382-A:3-101: et seq.)	Yes (Note: Art. 4: N.H. Rev. Stat. Ann. § 382-A:4-101: et seq.)	Yes (Note: Art. 4A: N.H. Rev. Stat. Ann. § 382-A:4A-101: et seq.)	Yes (Note: Art. 5: N.H. Rev. Stat. Ann. § 382-A:5-101: et seq.)	No	Yes (Note: Art. 7: N.H. Rev. Stat. Ann. § 382-A:7-101: et seq.)	Yes (Note: Art. 8: N.H. Rev. Stat. Ann. § 382-A:8-101: et seq.)	Yes (Note: Art. 9: N.H. Rev. Stat. Ann. § 382-A:9-101: et seq.)	Yes (Note: Art. 12: N.H. Rev. Stat. Ann. § 382-A:12-101: et seq.)
New Jersey	Yes (Note: Art. 1: N.J. Stat. Ann. § 12A:1-101 et seq.)	Yes (Note: Art. 2: N.J. Stat. Ann. § 12A:2-101 et seq.)	Yes (Note: Art. 2A: N.J. Stat. Ann. § 12A:2A-101 et seq.)	Yes (Note: Art. 3: N.J. Stat. Ann. § 12A:3-101 et seq.)	Yes (Note: Art. 4: N.J. Stat. Ann. § 12A:4-101 et seq.)	Yes (Note: Art. 4A: N.J. Stat. Ann. § 12A:4A-101 et seq.)	Yes (Note: Art. 5: N.J. Stat. Ann. § 12A:5-101 et seq.)	No	Yes (Note: Art. 7: N.J. Stat. Ann. § 12A:7-101 et seq.)	Yes (Note: Art. 8: N.J. Stat. Ann. § 12A:8-101 et seq.)	Yes (Note: Art. 9: N.J. Stat. Ann. § 12A:9-101 et seq.)	No
New Mexico	Yes (Note: Art. 1: N.M. Stat. Ann. § 55-1-101 et seq.)	Yes (Note: Art. 2: N.M. Stat. Ann. § 55-2-101 et seq.)	Yes (Note: Art. 2A: N.M. Stat. Ann. § 55-2A-101 et seq.)	Yes (Note: Art. 3: N.M. Stat. Ann. § 55-3-101 et seq.)	Yes (Note: Art. 4: N.M. Stat. Ann. § 55-4-101 et seq.)	Yes (Note: Art. 4A: N.M. Stat. Ann. § 55-4A-101 et seq.)	Yes (Note: Art. 5: N.M. Stat. Ann. § 55-5-101 et seq.)	No	Yes (Note: Art. 7: N.M. Stat. Ann. § 55-7-101 et seq.)	Yes (Note: Art. 8: N.M. Stat. Ann. § 55-8-101 et seq.)	Yes (Note: Art. 9: N.M. Stat. Ann. § 55-9-101 et seq.)	Yes (Note: Art. 12: N.M. Stat. Ann. § 55-12-101 et seq.)
New York	Yes (Note: Art. 1: N.Y. U.C.C. Law § 1-101 et seq.)	Yes (Note: Art. 2: N.Y. U.C.C. Law § 2-101 et seq.)	Yes (Note: Art. 2A: N.Y. U.C.C. Law § 2-A-101 et seq.)	Yes (Note: Art. 3: N.Y. U.C.C. Law § 3-101 et seq.)	Yes (Note: Art. 4: N.Y. U.C.C. Law § 4-101 et seq.)	Yes (Note: Art. 4A: N.Y. U.C.C. Law § 4-A-101 et seq.)	Yes (Note: Art. 5: N.Y. U.C.C. Law § 5-101 et seq.)	No	Yes (Note: Art. 7: N.Y. U.C.C. Law § 7-101 et seq.)	Yes (Note: Art. 8: N.Y. U.C.C. Law § 8-101 et seq.)	Yes (Note: Art. 9: N.Y. U.C.C. Law § 9-101 et seq.)	No
North Carolina	Yes (Note: Art. 1: N.C. Gen. Stat. § 25-1-101 et seq.)	Yes (Note: Art. 2: N.C. Gen. Stat. § 25-2-101 et seq.)	Yes (Note: Art. 2A: N.C. Gen. Stat. § 25-2A-101 et seq.)	Yes (Note: Art. 3: N.C. Gen. Stat. § 25-3-101 et seq.)	Yes (Note: Art. 4: N.C. Gen. Stat. § 25-4-101 et seq.)	Yes (Note: Art. 4A: N.C. Gen. Stat. § 25-4A-101 et seq.)	Yes (Note: Art. 5: N.C. Gen. Stat. § 25-5-101 et seq.)	No	Yes (Note: Art. 7: N.C. Gen. Stat. § 25-7-101 et seq.)	Yes (Note: Art. 8: N.C. Gen. Stat. § 25-8-101 et seq.)	Yes (Note: Art. 9: N.C. Gen. Stat. § 25-9-101 et seq.)	No
North Dakota	Yes (Note: Art. 1: N.D. Cent. Code § 41-01-01 et seq.)	Yes (Note: Art. 2: N.D. Cent. Code § 41-02-01 et seq.)	Yes (Note: Art. 2A: N.D. Cent. Code § 41-02.1-01 et seq.)	Yes (Note: Art. 3: N.D. Cent. Code § 41-03-01 et seq.)	Yes (Note: Art. 4: N.D. Cent. Code § 41-04-01 et seq.)	Yes (Note: Art. 4A: N.D. Cent. Code § 41-04.1-01 et seq.)	Yes (Note: Art. 5: N.D. Cent. Code § 41-05-01 et seq.)	No	Yes (Note: Art. 7: N.D. Cent. Code § 41-07-01 et seq.)	Yes (Note: Art. 8: N.D. Cent. Code § 41-08-01 et seq.)	Yes (Note: Art. 9: N.D. Cent. Code § 41-09-01 et seq.)	Yes (Note: Art. 12: N.D. Cent. Code § 41-12-01 et seq.)
Northern Mariana Islands	Yes (Note: Art. 1: 5 N. Mar. I. Code § 1101 et seq.)	Yes (Note: Art. 2: 5 N. Mar. I. Code § 2101 et seq.)	No	Yes (Note: Art. 3: 5 N. Mar. I. Code § 3101 et seq.)	Yes (Note: Art. 4: 5 N. Mar. I. Code § 4101 et seq.)	No	Yes (Note: Art. 5: 5 N. Mar. I. Code § 5101 et seq.)	Yes (Note: Art. 6: 5 N. Mar. I. Code § 6101 et seq.)	Yes (Note: Art. 7: 5 N. Mar. I. Code § 7101 et seq.)	Yes (Note: Art. 8: 5 N. Mar. I. Code § 8101 et seq.)	Yes (Note: Art. 9: 5 N. Mar. I. Code § 9101 et seq.)	No
Ohio	Yes (Note: Art. 1: Ohio Rev. Code Ann. § 1301.101 et seq.)	Yes (Note: Art. 2: Ohio Rev. Code Ann. § 1302.01 et seq.)	Yes (Note: Art. 2A: Ohio Rev. Code Ann. § 1310.01 et seq.)	Yes (Note: Art. 3: Ohio Rev. Code Ann. § 1303.01 et seq.)	Yes (Note: Art. 4: Ohio Rev. Code Ann. § 1304.01 et seq.)	Yes (Note: Art. 4: Ohio Rev. Code Ann. § 1304.51 et seq.)	Yes (Note: Art. 5: Ohio Rev. Code Ann. § 1305.01 et seq.)	No	Yes (Note: Art. 7: Ohio Rev. Code Ann. § 1307.101 et seq.)	Yes (Note: Art. 8: Ohio Rev. Code Ann. § 1308.01 et seq.)	Yes (Note: Art. 9: Ohio Rev. Code Ann. § 1309.101 et seq.)	No
Oklahoma	Yes (Note: Art. 1: Okla. Stat. tit. 12A, § 1-101 et seq.)	Yes (Note: Art. 2: Okla. Stat. tit. 12A, § 2-101 et seq.)	Yes (Note: Art. 2A: Okla. Stat. tit. 12A, § 2A-101 et seq.)	Yes (Note: Art. 3: Okla. Stat. tit. 12A, § 3-101 et seq.)	Yes (Note: Art. 4: Okla. Stat. tit. 12A, § 4-101 et seq.)	Yes (Note: Art. 4A: Okla. Stat. tit. 12A, § 4A-101 et seq.)	Yes (Note: Art. 5: Okla. Stat. tit. 12A, § 5-101 et seq.)	No	Yes (Note: Art. 7: Okla. Stat. tit. 12A, § 7-101 et seq.)	Yes (Note: Art. 8: Okla. Stat. tit. 12A, § 8-101 et seq.)	Yes (Note: Art. 9: Okla. Stat. tit. 12A, § 9-101 et seq.)	No
Oregon	Yes (Note: Art. 1: Or. Rev. Stat. § 71.1010 et seq.)	Yes (Note: Art. 2: Or. Rev. Stat. § 72.1010 et seq.)	Yes (Note: Art. 2A: Or. Rev. Stat. § 72A.1010 et seq.)	Yes (Note: Art. 3: Or. Rev. Stat. § 73.0101 et seq.)	Yes (Note: Art. 4: Or. Rev. Stat. § 74.1010 et seq.)	Yes (Note: Art. 4A: Or. Rev. Stat. § 74A.1010 et seq.)	Yes (Note: Art. 5: Or. Rev. Stat. § 75.1010 et seq.)	No	Yes (Note: Art. 7: Or. Rev. Stat. § 77.1010 et seq.)	Yes (Note: Art. 8: Or. Rev. Stat. § 78.1010 et seq.)	Yes (Note: Art. 9: Or. Rev. Stat. § 79.0101 et seq.)	No
Pennsylvania	Yes (Note: Art. 1: Pa. Cons. Stat. § 1101 et seq.)	Yes (Note: Art. 2: Pa. Cons. Stat. § 2101 et seq.)	Yes (Note: Art. 2A: Pa. Cons. Stat. § 2A101 et seq.)	Yes (Note: Art. 3: Pa. Cons. Stat. § 3101 et seq.)	Yes (Note: Art. 4: Pa. Cons. Stat. § 4101 et seq.)	Yes (Note: Art. 4A: Pa. Cons. Stat. § 4A101 et seq.)	Yes (Note: Art. 5: Pa. Cons. Stat. § 5101 et seq.)	No	Yes (Note: Art. 7: Pa. Cons. Stat. § 7101 et seq.)	Yes (Note: Art. 8: Pa. Cons. Stat. § 8101 et seq.)	Yes (Note: Art. 9: Pa. Cons. Stat. § 9101 et seq.)	No
Puerto Rico	Yes (Note: Art. 1: P.R. Laws Ann. tit. 19, § 401 et seq.)	No	No	Yes (Note: Art. 3: P.R. Laws Ann. tit. 19, § 501 et seq.)	Yes (Note: Art. 4: P.R. Laws Ann. tit. 19, § 801 et seq.)	Yes (Note: Art. 4A: P.R. Laws Ann. tit. 19, § 1021 et seq.)	Yes (Note: Art. 5: P.R. Laws Ann. tit. 19, § 1221 et seq.)	No	Yes (Note: Art. 7: P.R. Laws Ann. tit. 19, § 1401 et seq.)	Yes (Note: Art. 8: P.R. Laws Ann. tit. 19, § 1701 et seq.)	Yes (Note: Art. 9: P.R. Laws Ann. tit. 19, § 2001 et seq.)	No
Rhode Island	Yes (Note: Art. 1: R.I. Gen. Laws § 6A-1-101 et seq.)	Yes (Note: Art. 2: R.I. Gen. Laws § 6A-2-101 et seq.)	Yes (Note: Art. 2A: R.I. Gen. Laws § 6A-2.1-101 et seq.)	Yes (Note: Art. 3: R.I. Gen. Laws § 6A-3-101 et seq.)	Yes (Note: Art. 4: R.I. Gen. Laws § 6A-4-101 et seq.)	Yes (Note: Art. 4A: R.I. Gen. Laws § 6A-4.1-101 et seq.)	Yes (Note: Art. 5: R.I. Gen. Laws § 6A-5-101 et seq.)	No	Yes (Note: Art. 7: R.I. Gen. Laws § 6A-7-101 et seq.)	Yes (Note: Art. 8: R.I. Gen. Laws § 6A-8-101 et seq.)	Yes (Note: Art. 9: R.I. Gen. Laws § 6A-9-101 et seq.)	No
Sac and Fox Nation	No	No	No	No	No	No	No	No	No	No	Yes (Note: Art. 9: Sac and Fox Nation Code of Laws tit. 27, § 9-101 et seq.)	No
Seminole Nation of Oklahoma	No	No	No	No	No	No	No	No	No	No	Yes (Note: Art. 9: Seminole Nation of Oklahoma Code of Laws tit. 29, § 101 et seq.)	No
South Carolina	Yes (Note: Art. 1: S.C. Code Ann. § 36-1-101 et seq.)	Yes (Note: Art. 2: S.C. Code Ann. § 36-2-101 et seq.)	Yes (Note: Art. 2A: S.C. Code Ann. § 36-2A-101 et seq.)	Yes (Note: Art. 3: S.C. Code Ann. § 36-3-101 et seq.)	Yes (Note: Art. 4: S.C. Code Ann. § 36-4-101 et seq.)	Yes (Note: Art. 4A: S.C. Code Ann. § 36-4A-101 et seq.)	Yes (Note: Art. 5: S.C. Code Ann. § 36-5-101 et seq.)	No	Yes (Note: Art. 7: S.C. Code Ann. § 36-7-101 et seq.)	Yes (Note: Art. 8: S.C. Code Ann. § 36-8-101 et seq.)	Yes (Note: Art. 9: S.C. Code Ann. § 36-9-101 et seq.)	No
South Dakota	Yes (Note: Art. 1: S.D. Codified Laws § 57A-1-101 et seq.)	Yes (Note: Art. 2: S.D. Codified Laws § 57A-2-101 et seq.)	Yes (Note: Art. 2A: S.D. Codified Laws § 57A-2A-101 et seq.)	Yes (Note: Art. 3: S.D. Codified Laws § 57A-3-101 et seq.)	Yes (Note: Art. 4: S.D. Codified Laws § 57A-4-101 et seq.)	Yes (Note: Art. 4A: S.D. Codified Laws § 57A-4A-101 et seq.)	Yes (Note: Art. 5: S.D. Codified Laws § 57A-5-101 et seq.)	No	Yes (Note: Art. 7: S.D. Codified Laws § 57A-7-101 et seq.)	Yes (Note: Art. 8: S.D. Codified Laws § 57A-8-101 et seq.)	Yes (Note: Art. 9: S.D. Codified Laws § 57A-9-101 et seq.)	No
Standing Rock Sioux Tribe	No	No	No	No	No	No	No	No	No	No	Yes (Note: Art. 9: Standing Rock Sioux Tribal Code of Justice tit. 24, § 101 et seq.)	No
Tennessee	Yes (Note: Art. 1: Tenn. Code Ann. § 47-1-101 et seq.)	Yes (Note: Art. 2: Tenn. Code Ann. § 47-2-101 et seq.)	Yes (Note: Art. 2A: Tenn. Code Ann. § 47-2A-101 et seq.)	Yes (Note: Art. 3: Tenn. Code Ann. § 47-3-101 et seq.)	Yes (Note: Art. 4: Tenn. Code Ann. § 47-4-101 et seq.)	Yes (Note: Art. 4A: Tenn. Code Ann. § 47-4A-101 et seq.)	Yes (Note: Art. 5: Tenn. Code Ann. § 47-5-101 et seq.)	No	Yes (Note: Art. 7: Tenn. Code Ann. § 47-7-101 et seq.)	Yes (Note: Art. 8: Tenn. Code Ann. § 47-8-101 et seq.)	Yes (Note: Art. 9: Tenn. Code Ann. § 47-9-101 et seq.)	No
Texas	Yes (Note: Art. 1: Tex. Bus. & Com. Code Ann. § 1.101 et seq.)	Yes (Note: Art. 2: Tex. Bus. & Com. Code Ann. § 2.101 et seq.)	Yes (Note: Art. 2A: Tex. Bus. & Com. Code Ann. § 2A.101 et seq.)	Yes (Note: Art. 3: Tex. Bus. & Com. Code Ann. § 3.101 et seq.)	Yes (Note: Art. 4: Tex. Bus. & Com. Code Ann. § 4.101 et seq.)	Yes (Note: Art. 4A: Tex. Bus. & Com. Code Ann. § 4A.101 et seq.)	Yes (Note: Art. 5: Tex. Bus. & Com. Code Ann. § 5.101 et seq.)	No	Yes (Note: Art. 7: Tex. Bus. & Com. Code Ann. § 7.101 et seq.)	Yes (Note: Art. 8: Tex. Bus. & Com. Code Ann. § 8.101 et seq.)	Yes (Note: Art. 9: Tex. Bus. & Com. Code Ann. § 9.101 et seq.)	No
U.S. Virgin Islands	Yes (Note: Art. 1: V.I. Code Ann. tit. 11A, § 1-101 et seq.)	Yes (Note: Art. 2: V.I. Code Ann. tit. 11A, § 2-101 et seq.)	Yes (Note: Art. 2A: V.I. Code Ann. tit. 11A, § 2A-101 et seq.)	Yes (Note: Art. 3: V.I. Code Ann. tit. 11A, § 3-101 et seq.)	Yes (Note: Art. 4: V.I. Code Ann. tit. 11A, § 4-101 et seq.)	Yes (Note: Art. 4A: V.I. Code Ann. tit. 11A, § 4A-101 et seq.)	Yes (Note: Art. 5: V.I. Code Ann. tit. 11A, § 5-101 et seq.)	No	Yes (Note: Art. 7: V.I. Code Ann. tit. 11A, § 7-101 et seq.)	Yes (Note: Art. 8: V.I. Code Ann. tit. 11A, § 8-101 et seq.)	Yes (Note: Art. 9: V.I. Code Ann. tit. 11A, § 9-101 et seq.)	No
Utah	Yes (Note: Art. 1: Utah Code Ann. § 70A-1a-101 et seq.)	Yes (Note: Art. 2: Utah Code Ann. § 70A-2-101 et seq.)	Yes (Note: Art. 2A: Utah Code Ann. § 70A-2a-101 et seq.)	Yes (Note: Art. 3: Utah Code Ann. § 70A-3-101 et seq.)	Yes (Note: Art. 4: Utah Code Ann. § 70A-4-101 et seq.)	Yes (Note: Art. 4A: Utah Code Ann. § 70A-4a-101 et seq.)	Yes (Note: Art. 5: Utah Code Ann. § 70A-5-101 et seq.)	No	Yes (Note: Art. 7: Utah Code Ann. § 70A-7a-101 et seq.)	Yes (Note: Art. 8: Utah Code Ann. § 70A-8-100 et seq.)	Yes (Note: Art. 9: Utah Code Ann. § 70A-9a-101 et seq.)	No
Vermont	Yes (Note: Art. 1: Vt. Stat. Ann. tit. 9A, § 1-101 et seq.)	Yes (Note: Art. 2: Vt. Stat. Ann. tit. 9A, § 2-101 et seq.)	Yes (Note: Art. 2A: Vt. Stat. Ann. tit. 9A, § 2A-101 et seq.)	Yes (Note: Art. 3: Vt. Stat. Ann. tit. 9A, § 3-101 et seq.)	Yes (Note: Art. 4: Vt. Stat. Ann. tit. 9A, § 4-101 et seq.)	Yes (Note: Art. 4A: Vt. Stat. Ann. tit. 9A, § 4A-101 et seq.)	Yes (Note: Art. 5: Vt. Stat. Ann. tit. 9A, § 5-101 et seq.)	No	Yes (Note: Art. 7: Vt. Stat. Ann. tit. 9A, § 7-101 et seq.)	Yes (Note: Art. 8: Vt. Stat. Ann. tit. 9A, § 8-101 et seq.)	Yes (Note: Art. 9: Vt. Stat. Ann. tit. 9A, § 9-101 et seq.)	No
Virginia	Yes (Note: Art. 1: Va. Code Ann. § 8.2-101 et seq.)	Yes (Note: Art. 2: Va. Code Ann. § 8.1A-101 et seq.)	Yes (Note: Art. 2A: Va. Code Ann. § 8.2A-101 et seq.)	Yes (Note: Art. 3: Va. Code Ann. § 8.3A-101 et seq.)	Yes (Note: Art. 4: Va. Code Ann. § 8.4-101 et seq.)	Yes (Note: Art. 4A: Va. Code Ann. § 8.4A-101 et seq.)	Yes (Note: Art. 5: Va. Code Ann. § 8.5A-101 et seq.)	No	Yes (Note: Art. 7: Va. Code Ann. § 8.7-101 et seq.)	Yes (Note: Art. 8: Va. Code Ann. § 8.8A-101 et seq.)	Yes (Note: Art. 9: Va. Code Ann. § 8.9A-101 et seq.)	No
Washington	Yes (Note: Art. 1: Wash. Rev. Code § 62A.1-101 et seq.)	Yes (Note: Art. 2: Wash. Rev. Code § 62A.2-101 et seq.)	Yes (Note: Art. 2A: Wash. Rev. Code § 62A.2A-101 et seq.)	Yes (Note: Art. 3: Wash. Rev. Code § 62A.3-101 et seq.)	Yes (Note: Art. 4: Wash. Rev. Code § 62A.4-101 et seq.)	Yes (Note: Art. 4A: Wash. Rev. Code § 62A.4A-101 et seq.)	Yes (Note: Art. 5: Wash. Rev. Code § 62A.5-101 et seq.)	No	Yes (Note: Art. 7: Wash. Rev. Code § 62A.7-101 et seq.)	Yes (Note: Art. 8: Wash. Rev. Code § 62A.8-101 et seq.)	Yes (Note: Art. 9: Wash. Rev. Code § 62A.9A-101 et seq.)	Yes (Note: Art. 12: Wash. Rev. Code § 62A.12-101 et seq.)
West Virginia	Yes (Note: Art. 1: W. Va. Code § 46-1-101 et seq.)	Yes (Note: Art. 2: W. Va. Code § 46-2-101 et seq.)	Yes (Note: Art. 2A: W. Va. Code § 46-2A-101 et seq.)	Yes (Note: Art. 3: W. Va. Code § 46-3-101 et seq.)	Yes (Note: Art. 4: W. Va. Code § 46-4-101 et seq.)	Yes (Note: Art. 4A: W. Va. Code § 46-4A-101 et seq.)	Yes (Note: Art. 5: W. Va. Code § 46-5-101 et seq.)	No	Yes (Note: Art. 7: W. Va. Code § 46-7-101 et seq.)	Yes (Note: Art. 8: W. Va. Code § 46-8-101 et seq.)	Yes (Note: Art. 9: W. Va. Code § 46-9-101 et seq.)	No
Wisconsin	Yes (Note: Art. 1: Wisc. Stat. § 401.101 et seq.)	Yes (Note: Art. 2: Wisc. Stat. § 402.101 et seq.)	Yes (Note: Art. 2A: Wisc. Stat. § 411.101 et seq.)	Yes (Note: Art. 3: Wisc. Stat. § 403.102 et seq.)	Yes (Note: Art. 4: Wisc. Stat. § 404.102 et seq.)	Yes (Note: Art. 4A: Wisc. Stat. § 410.101 et seq.)	Yes (Note: Art. 5: Wisc. Stat. § 405.101 et seq.)	No	Yes (Note: Art. 7: Wisc. Stat. § 407.101 et seq.)	Yes (Note: Art. 8: Wisc. Stat. § 408.101 et seq.)	Yes (Note: Art. 9: Wisc. Stat. § 409.101 et seq.)	No
Wyoming	Yes (Note: Art. 1: Wyo. Stat. Ann. § 34.1-1-101 et seq.)	Yes (Note: Art. 2: Wyo. Stat. Ann. § 34.1-2-101 et seq.)	Yes (Note: Art. 2A: Wyo. Stat. Ann. § 34.1-2.A-101 et seq.)	Yes (Note: Art. 3: Wyo. Stat. Ann. § 34.1-3-101 et seq.)	Yes (Note: Art. 4: Wyo. Stat. Ann. § 34.1-4-101 et seq.)	Yes (Note: Art. 4A: Wyo. Stat. Ann. § 34.1-4.A-101 et seq.)	Yes (Note: Art. 5: Wyo. Stat. Ann. § 34.1-5-101 et seq.)	No	Yes (Note: Art. 7: Wyo. Stat. Ann. § 34.1-7-101 et seq.)	Yes (Note: Art. 8: Wyo. Stat. Ann. § 34.1-8-101 et seq.)	Yes (Note: Art. 9: Wyo. Stat. Ann. § 34.1-9-101 et seq.)	No

== UCC adoption legal citations ==
The following list provides legal citations for each U.S. jurisdiction's adoption of articles in the UCC.
