= Kirksey v. Kirksey =

Alabama Supreme Court case from 1845

- Court: Supreme Court of Alabama
- Decided: January, 1845
- Defendant: Isaac Kirksey
- Plaintiff: Antillico Kirksey

Court membership
- Judge sitting: Byrd

Kirksey v. Kirksey, 8 Ala. 131 (1845), was a case decided by the Supreme Court of Alabama that held that a promise by a man, Issac Kirksey, to give his sister-in-law a house if she would move to his land was not a valid contract because it lacked bargained-for-consideration.

The trial was initiated in Talladega, Alabama.

== Background ==
The plaintiff Antillico Kirksey was a widow living in a lease-to-own home. After learning of his brother and nephew's deaths, the defendant wrote the following letter to his sister-in-law Antillico:

Dear sister Antillico--Much to my mortification, I heard, that brother Henry was dead, and one of his children. I know that your situation is one of grief, and difficulty. You had a bad chance before, but a great deal worse now. I should like to come and see you, but cannot with convenience at present. I donor [recte do not] know whether you have a preference on the place you live on, or not. If you had, I would advise you to obtain your preference, and sell the land and quit the country, as I understand it is very unhealthy, and I know society is very bad. If you will come down and see me, I will let you have a place to raise your family, and I have more open land than I can tend; and on the account of your situation, and that of your family, I feel like I want you and the children to do well.

Antillico relied on a promise from her brother-in-law and subsequently gave up her leased home. This home would become her opportunity cost when she moved into her brother-in-law's home.

The plaintiff won a $200 judgement at the trial court level, and the defendant appealed.

== Decision ==
After receiving the letter from her brother-in-law, the plaintiff moved to the defendant's farm, but the defendant kicked her out after two years, forcing her to live in a dilapidated house in the woods.

Thus, the plaintiff sued to enforce the promise, but the court did not find a valid contract. It held that a promise on the condition, "[i]f you will come down and see me" is not a bargained for exchange for the promisee's "com[ing] down to see" the promisor. The promise is not sufficiently supported by bargained-for consideration and is not enforceable.

Justice John James Ormond issued a dissenting opinion in this case.

== Legal analysis ==
Samuel Williston has opined that the plaintiff should have been allowed to invoke a promissory estoppel which allows plaintiffs to demand remedy for misleading promises. The idea of a "promissory estoppel" had not been fashioned at the time of the Kirksey holding which could have addressed the injustice experienced by the plaintiff. The injustice was based on detrimental reliance on a broken promise.

== See also ==
- Hoffman v. Red Owl Stores, Inc., 1965, Supreme Court of Wisconsin
- 700 F. 2d 916 - Vastoler v. American Can Company, 1983, United States Court of Appeals, Third Circuit
