= Illusory promise =

In contract law, an illusory promise is one that courts will not enforce. This is in contrast with a contract, which is a promise that courts will enforce. A promise may be illusory for a number of reasons. In common law countries this usually results from failure or lack of consideration (see also consideration under English law).

Illusory promises are so named because they merely hold the illusion of contract. For example, a promise of the form, "I will give you ten dollars if I feel like it," is purely illusory and will not be enforced as a contract.

It is a general principle of contract law that courts should err on the side of enforcing contracts. Parties entering into the arrangement presumably had the intention of forming an enforceable contract, and so courts generally attempt to follow this intention.

A promise conditioned upon an event within the promisor's control is not illusory if the promisor also "impliedly promises to make reasonable effort to bring the event about or to use good faith and honest judgment in determining whether or not it has in fact occurred."

Methods of finding potentially illusory contracts enforceable include:

- Implied-in-law "good faith" terms
- Implied-in-fact terms
- Bargaining for a chance

== Implied-in-law "good faith" terms ==
Many contracts include "satisfaction clauses", in which a promisor can refuse to pay if he isn't subjectively satisfied with the promisee's performance. Strictly speaking, this is an illusory promise, since the promisor has no actual legal burden to pay if he chooses not to. However, courts will generally imply in law that the promisor must act in good faith and reject the deal only if he is genuinely dissatisfied. As another example, if a contract promises a promisee a certain percentage of the proceeds of a promisor's business activities, this is illusory, since the promisor doesn't have to do anything: any percentage of zero is zero. However, courts may find that the promisor made an implied promise to use reasonable efforts to try to make money, and cite him for breach of contract if he does absolutely nothing. The U.C.C. in contracts exclusive to both sides requires "best efforts" in such contracts. This may be read to be the same as a good faith effort, but is seen by some courts as a higher duty.

== Implied-in-fact terms ==
Judges will often infer terms into the contract that the parties did not explicitly cite. For instance, in the "satisfaction clause" case, judges might infer that the parties intended a "reasonableness test" - that the clause could be satisfied if a reasonable person would be satisfied by the promisee's performance, regardless of whether the promisor himself asserts he is satisfied. (This interpretation is often used in cases in which a performance can be objectively evaluated, such as with the construction of a warehouse; the implied-in-law interpretation above is preferred where satisfaction is more subjective, as with the painting of a portrait.)

== Bargaining for a chance ==
Many judges would consider the "bargaining for a percentage of the proceeds" example above an enforceable contract, even without an implied-in-fact or implied-in-law good faith term. They would view the opportunity to enter into a business relationship to itself be acceptable consideration. Put differently, the mere possibility that the promisor would do business is a valuable product of the bargain even if he does not do anything. Of course, if the promisor entered into the relationship purely with the intent of fraudulently harming the promisee, he could be cited for fraud or bad faith principles that apply to all contracts.

== Changes to a "contract" without notification ==
The "terms and conditions" of some websites and Software applications may be deemed an illusory contract and unenforceable if the language can be changed at any time by the company without notifying users and giving them a chance to accept the new changes.

In Douglas v. U.S. District Court ex rel Talk America, the court found a telephone service provider could not change the terms of its service contract by merely posting a revised contract on its website because "an offeree cannot assent to an offer unless he knows of its existence."
