= Non-compete clauses in the United States =

The majority of U.S. states recognize and enforce various forms of non-compete agreements. A few states, such as California, North Dakota, Oklahoma, and Minnesota totally ban noncompete agreements for employees, or prohibit all noncompete agreements except in limited circumstances.

== Prevalence and status ==
Data from 2018 indicates that non-compete clauses cover 18 percent of American labor force participants. A 2023 petition to the FTC to ban non-compete agreements estimated that about 30 million workers (about 20% of all U.S. workers) were subject to a noncompete clause. While higher-wage workers are comparatively more likely to be covered by non-compete clauses, non-competes covered 14 percent of workers without college degrees in 2018. By some estimates, nearly half of all technical workers are covered by non-compete agreements.

== Federal law ==
In March 2019, Democratic officials, labor unions, and workers' advocacy groups urged the U.S. FTC to ban non-compete clauses. A petition to the FTC, seeking a ban on noncompete clauses, was submitted by the AFL-CIO, SEIU, and Public Citizen. In July 2021, President Joe Biden signed Executive Order 14036, directing the FTC (whose chair, Lina Khan, he had recently appointed), as well as other federal agencies, to "curtail the unfair use of non-compete clauses and other clauses or agreements that may unfairly limit worker mobility". On January 5, 2023, the FTC proposed a rule banning non-compete agreements.

The U.S. Chamber of Commerce has lobbied against bans on non-compete agreements; in 2023, it threatened to sue the FTC if it bans non-compete agreements. The Chamber argued that "noncompete agreements are an important tool in fostering innovation and preserving competition".

=== Federal Trade Commission ===
On April 23, 2024, the Federal Trade Commission (FTC) issued a ban on nearly all non-compete agreements. The rule was published on the Federal Register on May 7 and the ban was scheduled to go into effect on September 4, 2024.

The FTC found as shown the use of non-compete clauses by employers has negatively affected competition in labor markets, resulting in reduced wages for workers across the labor force—including workers not bound by non-compete clauses and that by suppressing labor mobility, non-compete clauses have negatively affected competition in product and service markets in several ways. The commission noted that the existing legal frameworks governing non-compete clauses—formed decades ago, without the benefit of this evidence—allow serious anticompetitive harm to labor, product, and service markets to go unchecked. The Commission noted "that instead of using noncompetes to lock in workers, employers that wish to retain employees can compete on the merits for the worker's labor services by improving wages and working conditions." In 2024, approximately one in five American workers, or about 30 million people, are subject to noncompetes.

On August 20, 2024, Judge Ada Brown of the District Court for the Northern District of Texas issued an injunction blocking the rule, ruling that the FTC "lacks statutory authority to promulgate the Non-Compete Rule, and that the Rule is arbitrary and capricious." On October 18, 2024, the FTC appealed the ruling to the U.S. Court of Appeals for the Fifth Circuit.

== Laws by state ==
=== California ===
Non-compete agreements are automatically void as a matter of law in California, except for a small set of specific situations expressly authorized by statute. They were outlawed by the original California Civil Code in 1872 (Civ. Code, former § 1673).

==== Enforcement of out-of-state agreements ====
A leading court decision discussing the conflict between California law and the laws of other states is the 1998 California 4th District Court of Appeal decision Application Group, Inc. v. Hunter Group, Inc. In Hunter, a Maryland company required that its Maryland-based employee agree to a one-year non-compete agreement. The contract stated that it was governed by and to be construed according to Maryland law. A Maryland employee then left to work for a competitor in California. When the new California employer sued in California state court to invalidate the covenant not to compete, the California court agreed and ruled that the non-compete provision was invalid and not enforceable in California. Business and Professions Code Section 16600 reflects a "strong public policy of the State of California" and the state has a strong interest in applying its law and protecting its businesses so that they can hire the employees of their choosing. California law is thus applicable to non-California employees seeking employment in California.

Whether California courts are required by the Full Faith and Credit Clause of the United States Constitution to enforce equitable judgments from courts of other states, having personal jurisdiction over the defendant, that enjoin competition or are contrary to important public interests in California is an issue that has not yet been decided.

==== Exceptions ====
There are limited situations where a reasonable non-compete agreement may be valid in California.

1. Where the owner of a business is selling the entire business, or is selling the goodwill in the business, the seller may be bound by a non-compete clause.
2. When there is a dissolution or disassociation of a partnership.
3. Where there is a dissolution of a limited liability company.

=== Colorado ===
Non-compete agreements in the state of Colorado are generally void unless they fall into a few select exceptions. Those exceptions include "(a) Any contract for the purchase and sale of a business or the assets of a business; (b) Any contract for the protection of trade secrets; (c) Any contractual provision providing for recovery of the expense of educating and training an employee who has served an employer for a period of less than two years; and (d) Executive and management personnel and officers and employees who constitute professional staff to executive and management personnel." At the time the statute was enacted, Colorado's approach to regulating non-compete agreements was a unique approach.

=== Florida ===
The enforceability of non-compete agreements in the state of Florida is quite common. Some law firms build their law practice around these agreements and represent employees, employers and potential new employers of an employee currently bound by a non-compete agreement. The agreement is not allowed to be overly broad and generally difficult to enforce if it is for more than two years. However, Florida courts will rarely refuse to enforce a non-compete agreement due to its length or geographic scope. Instead, under Florida law, courts are required to "blue pencil" an impermissibly broad or lengthy non-compete agreement to make it reasonable within the limits of Fla. Stat. § 542.335. Also if the agreement is part of a general employment contract then there is the possibility of a prior breach by an employer. This may cause the non-compete clause of the contract to become unenforceable. However, recent case law from Florida's appellate courts may reduce the scope of the prior breach defense.

=== Hawaii ===
A new law bars high-tech companies, but only such companies, in Hawaii from requiring their employees to enter into "non-compete" and "non-solicit" agreements as a condition of employment. The new law, Act 158, went into effect on July 1, 2015.

=== Illinois ===
Non-compete agreements will be enforced in Illinois if the agreement is ancillary to a valid relationship (employment, sale of a business, etc.) and (1) must be no greater in scope than is required to protect a legitimate business interest of the employer, (2) must not impose an undue hardship on the employee, and (3) cannot be injurious to the public. While reasonable geographic and temporal limitations on the non-compete agreement are not expressly required by governing law, they tend to be examined as a measure of whether the scope of the non-compete is greater than is required to protect a legitimate business interest of the employer.

Unlike other jurisdictions, which follow the general rule that consideration is only important as to whether it exists and not as to whether it is adequate, Illinois will inquire into the adequacy of consideration. The majority of courts will require at least two years of continued at-will employment to support a non-compete agreement (or any other type of restrictive covenant). However, in certain cases involving particularly sharp conduct by an employee, courts have required less.

While Illinois courts state the rule above, logically the analytical steps should be in reverse order—because inadequate consideration is fatal to the claim. Thus, under McInnis v. OAG Motorcycle Ventures, Inc. there are three requirements in order for a post employment restrictive covenant limiting a former employee's right to work for a competitor to be enforceable under Illinois law:

1. it must be ancillary to a valid contract;
2. it must be supported by adequate consideration; and
3. it must be reasonable, considering whether it: (a) is no greater than is required for the protection of a legitimate business interest of the employer, (b) does not impose undue hardship on the employee, and (c) is not injurious to the public.

The McInnis decision interpreted the Fifield decision, above, to mandate two years' employment in order for consideration to be adequate.

Before January 1, 2021, the Illinois Freedom to Work Act prohibited employers from entering into a covenant not to compete with Illinois employees earning the greater of (1) the hourly rate equal to the minimum wage required by the applicable federal, State, or local minimum wage law or (2) $13.00 per hour.

The Illinois legislature passed an amendment to the Illinois Freedom to Work Act in 2021, that will take effect on January 1, 2022, which prohibits employers from entering into a non-compete agreement with an employee unless the employee earns over $75,000 per year.

The law codified the Illinois common law conditions that the non-compete agreement must (1) be reasonably necessary to protect the legitimate business interest of the employer, (2) be ancillary to a relationship or valid contract, and (3) be reasonably supported by adequate consideration.

One legitimate business interest that Illinois law protects is long-term relationships between a business and its customers.

Additionally, the law further codified the common law concerning non-compete agreements in that (1) a non-compete covenant must be no greater than is required for the protection of a legitimate business interest of the employer, (2) the non-compete covenant must not impose an undue hardship on the employee, and (3) the non-compete covenant must not be injurious to the public.

Further, in order for a non-compete agreement to be enforceable, the employer must advise the employee in writing to consult with an attorney before entering into the non-compete agreement and the employer must provide the employee with a copy of the covenant at least 14 calendar days before the commencement of the employee's employment or the employer.

The Illinois Attorney General may initiation or intervene in a civil action in the name of the people of the state of Illinois if it believes that an employer is engaged in a pattern and practice prohibited by the Illinois Freedom to Work Act.

If an employer includes a choice of law provision in an Illinois employee's employment agreement, the court will still apply Illinois law as to the covenant not to compete.

=== Maine ===
Maine imposes a number of restrictions upon non-compete agreements, which the state defines as a contract that "prohibits an employee or prospective employee from working in the same or similar profession or in a specified geographic area for a defined period of time following termination of employment".

Maine's 2019 L.D. 733 considers non-compete clauses contrary to public policy and valid only to protect employers' legitimate business interests, such as trade secrets, confidential information and goodwill. Under L.D. 733, employees making 400% or less of the federal poverty level (changing every year, but approximately $50,000 annually once quadrupled) cannot be made to sign non-compete agreements. Additionally, with mixed exceptions for physicians, non-competes can only take effect after one year from the employee's start date or six months after being signed, whichever is later. Prospective employers must disclose in writing the existence of non-compete agreements to prospective employers before making job offers; if a non-compete is to be signed, the employer must deliver it to current or prospective employees at least three business days before the required signing date. Violations result in fines of not less than $5,000.

The same penalty is incurred for restrictive employment agreements, defined as agreements between two or more employers, including franchises and contractors/subcontractors, that "prohibit or restrict one employer from soliciting or hiring another employer's current or former employees". Such agreements, commonly known as anti-poaching or no-poaching agreements, are categorically prohibited in Maine.

=== Massachusetts ===
In October 2018, a law went into effect that banned new non-compete agreements for all workers eligible for overtime, limited them to one year for others, and required compensation of 50% of salary (or other "mutually agreed upon consideration") for the period in effect. Litigation is expected to resolve the question of what counts as reasonable "mutually agreed upon consideration".

==== History ====
By 1837, Massachusetts had indisputably adopted the analysis established in Mitchel. In 1922, the Supreme Judicial Court eliminated any doubt that restrictive covenants in the employment context would be enforced when reasonable. The basic proposition enunciated long ago continued to apply in the 2000s: "A covenant not to compete is enforceable only if it is necessary to protect a legitimate business interest, reasonably limited in time and space, and consonant with the public interest."

Effective October 1, 2018, Massachusetts passed legislation – the Massachusetts Noncompetition Agreement Act (MNAA) – that fundamentally changed its noncompete law in several respects. Most significantly, under the MNAA, noncompetes must be given to employees with at least 10 business days notice; must satisfy specific, new consideration requirements; must be limited to 12 months, absent misconduct by the employee bound by the noncompete; and may not be used for "(i) an employee who is classified as nonexempt under the Fair Labor Standards Act, 29 U.S.C. 201-219; (ii) undergraduate or graduate students that partake in an internship or otherwise enter a short-term employment relationship with an employer, whether paid or unpaid, while enrolled in a full-time or part-time undergraduate or graduate educational institution; (iii) employees that have been terminated without cause or laid off; or (iv) employees age 18 or younger."

=== Michigan ===
With the passage of Michigan's Antitrust Reform Act 274 of 1984 the Michigan legislature simultaneously repealed a prohibition of restrictive covenants and created the framework for restrictive covenants entered into after March 29, 1985. Thereafter, Appellate Courts in Michigan began outlining and defining the "reasonableness" rule in terms of duration, geographic scope, and the type of employment prohibited, but to also consider the competitive business interest justifying the clause. As time went on the rule of reason was defined to only apply to restrictive covenants between employers and employees, and not to commercial noncompetes. Commercial noncompetes are deemed to be invalid only if they fail the antitrust "rule of reason".

Between March 7, 2023, and April 12, 2023, two bills, Senate Bill No. 143 and House Bill No. 4399, were introduced and if passed, would shift the "reasonableness" rule burden squarely on the employer, narrow antitrust law to permit non-competition agreements only when they are disclosed prior to hiring, and a complete prohibition of non-competes with "low-wage" employees. These proposed statutes will have a limited effect on most non-competition clauses as it only excludes low-wage employees, and might result in an expansion of other restrictive covenants such as non-solicitation clauses.

=== New Hampshire ===
New Hampshire imposes a number of restrictions upon non-compete clauses. The state defines a non-compete agreements as "an agreement that restricts such a low-wage employee from performing work for another employer for a specified period of time; working in a specified geographic area; or working for another employer that is similar to the work done by the employee for the employer who is a party to the non-compete agreement".

RSA 275:70 (2014) requires employers to disclose to prospective employees the existence of non-compete agreements and to make copies of those agreements available to prospective employees before they accept positions. Failure to disclose renders the non-compete agreement unenforceable, although other provisions, such as non-disclosure agreements (NDAs) and trade secret rules, remain in effect.

RSA 329:31-a (2016) makes unenforceable post-employment geographic restriction clauses for New Hampshire physicians' practice of medicine. This law applies to all forms of professional relationships with physicians, including partnerships and employment, and does not affect or invalidate other non-geographic post-employment restrictions.

RSA 275:70a (2019) prohibits and nullifies all existing non-compete contracts with low wage workers, defined as those earning hourly wages less than or equal to twice the federal minimum wage (assuming 2080 hours per year, the federal minimum yearly wage is $15,080; a low-wage New Hampshire worker makes ≤ $30,160 per year).

=== Rhode Island ===
The Rhode Island Noncompetition Agreement Act, made effective January 2020, imposes a number of restrictions on non-compete agreements.

Under the Act, non-compete agreements are not enforceable against employees 18 or under; school-enrolled undergraduate or graduate students (whether paid or unpaid or interns or employees); employees considered nonexempt under the federal Fair Labor Standards Act (FLSA); or low-wage employees, defined as those with annual earnings not greater than 250% of HHS federal poverty guidelines. While these guidelines change yearly, the current amount multiplied by 2.5 is over $31,000 annually.

The Act does not grandfather in pre-existing non-compete agreements. It also contains certain exemptions so as not to ensnare other forms of business agreement.

=== Texas ===
Under Texas law, a covenant not to compete

is enforceable if it is ancillary to or part of an otherwise enforceable agreement at the time the agreement is made to the extent that it contains limitations as to time, geographical area, and scope of activity to be restrained that are reasonable and do not impose a greater restraint than is necessary to protect the goodwill or other business interest of the promisee.

Article 15 of the Texas Business and Commerce Code covers this issue.

Specific rules apply to physicians, notably that a physician cannot be prohibited "from providing continuing care and treatment to a specific patient or patients during the course of an acute illness even after the contract or employment has been terminated".

However, Texas courts will not enforce a covenant not to compete if the court determines that such a covenant "is against public policy and therefore substantively unconscionable".

Several Texas Supreme Court opinions from 2006 onwards have broadened the nature of the consideration necessary to render a noncompete covenant enforceable. In a 2006 case, Alex Sheshunoff Management Services, L.P. v. Johnson and Strunk & Associates, L.P., it was held that an "otherwise enforceable agreement" can include an executory promise made in conjunction with an at-will employment agreement. This case required that the employer actually perform the promise it made at the time that it secured the non-competition agreement, for example by providing access to certain proprietary information or training. In a later 2009 case, Mann Frankfort Stein & Lipp Advisors, Inc. v. Fielding, the Supreme Court of Texas held that a covenant not to compete in an at-will employment agreement is also enforceable if the employee expressly promises not to disclose confidential information, but the employer makes no express return promise to provide confidential information, where "the nature of the employment for which the employee is hired will reasonably require the employer to provide confidential information to the employee for the employee to accomplish the contemplated job duties".

=== Utah ===
CNCs are enforceable, but any CNC entered into after May 10, 2016, may not extend for a period of more than one year.

=== Virginia ===
In Virginia, the enforceability of covenants not to compete is governed by common law principles. As restrictions on trade, CNCs are not favored by Virginia courts, which will enforce only narrowly drafted CNCs that do not offend public policy.

In Virginia, a plaintiff must prove by a preponderance of the evidence that the covenant is reasonable in the sense that it is: (1) no greater than necessary to protect its legitimate business interests, such as a trade secret; (2) not unduly harsh or oppressive in restricting the employee's ability to earn a living; and (3) not against public policy.

==== Legitimate business interest ====
In Virginia, courts weigh the (1) function, (2) geographic scope and (3) duration of the CNC against the employer's legitimate business interests to determine their reasonableness. Additionally, CNCs are only reasonable if they prevent the employee from entering into direct competition with the employer and must not encompass any activity in which the employer is not engaged. Virginia courts will not generally attempt to revise or enforce a narrower restriction in a non-compete agreement. As a result, a drafting error or unenforceable restriction may render the entire agreement unenforceable in Virginia.

==== Reasonable restriction on employee's ability to earn a living ====
Second, to enforce the CNC, a plaintiff must show that it is not unduly harsh or oppressive in restricting the employee's ability to earn a living. In Virginia, a CNC is not unduly harsh or oppressive if balancing its function, geographic scope and duration the employee is not precluded from (1) working in a capacity not in competition with the employer within the restricted area or (2) providing similar services outside the restricted area.

==== Public policy ====
Third, to enforce a CNC, a plaintiff must show the CNC is reasonable from the standpoint of a sound public policy. Virginia does not favor restrictions on employment and therefore CNCs are generally held against public policy unless they are narrowly drafted as enumerated above. In Virginia, a CNC does not violate public policy if the restrictions it imposes do not create a monopoly for the services offered by the employer or create a shortage of the skills provided by the employee.

=== Washington ===
According to Racine v. Bender, CNCs will be enforced by courts if they are validly formed and reasonable. There are exceptions, like in Labriola v. Pollard Group, Inc., where the Washington Supreme Court invalidated a CNC not supported by independent consideration by strictly enforcing the pre-existing duty rule.

The Washington Legislature in 2020, with RCW 49.62, nullified existing and future non-compete clauses for "low level" workers, defined as employees making $100,000 or less annually and independent contractors making $250,000 or less annually with both dollar amounts tied to inflation. Some criticized the setting of salary thresholds at only $100,000 as effectively exempting highly-paid Seattle tech-workers, noting how Amazon's lobbying efforts lowered the initial threshold, roughly $180,000, down to the enacted $100,000. Non-voided non-competes are also limited to a maximum post-employment length of 18 months, after which they become void. Additionally, employers must disclose the exact terms of non-compete agreements to prospective employees in writing before the prospective employees accept employment; failure to comply nullified the non-compete agreement.

Washington's restrictions on non-compete clauses excludes any such clause associated with the purchase or sale of any ownership interest or goodwill in a business.

== Cases ==
- In 2005, Microsoft and Google litigated the enforceability of a non-compete clause in Kai-Fu Lee's employment contract with Microsoft. Difference in state laws were highlighted as Google attempted to maneuver the case to California courts, where California law would be more likely to hold the clause unenforceable.
- IBM v. Papermaster (No. 08-9078, 2008 U.S. Dist): Mark Papermaster moving from IBM to Apple in 2008.
