= Angel v. Murray =

- State Seal of Rhode Island
- Court: Rhode Island Supreme Court
- Full case name: Alfred L. Angel v. John E. Murray, Jr., Director of Finance of the City of Newport
- Decided: July 22, 1974
- Citation: 113 R.I. 482, 322 A.2d 630, 85 A.L.R.3d 248 (1974)

Court membership
- Judges sitting: Thomas Hagan Roberts, C.J., Thomas J. Paolino, Alfred H. Joslin, John F. Doris, Thomas F. Kelleher, JJ.

Case opinions
- Unanimous opinion by Roberts

Angel v. Murray, 113 R.I. 482, 322 A.2d 630 (1974), was a case decided by the Rhode Island Supreme Court that first accepted the rule articulated in the Uniform Commercial Code §2-209(1) and the Restatement Second of Contracts §89(a) that the modification of a contract does not require its own consideration if the modification was made in good faith and was voluntarily accepted by both parties.

== Facts ==
James Maher had contracted with the city of Newport to collect all of the waste in the city for $137,000 per year for five years beginning in 1964. In 1967 Maher requested an additional $10,000 per year for refuse collection because of an unexpected increase in the number of dwellings in the city. Maher's request was approved, and a similar request the next year was also approved. The trial judge invalidated the extra payments because the modification of the contract was made without consideration.

== Judgment ==
The Rhode Island Supreme Court upheld the contract, finding persuasive the policy behind the provision in the Universal Commercial Code that allowed for modification of contracts without consideration if the modifications were made in good faith and were voluntarily accepted by both parties. However, because the UCC applies only to transactions involving goods, and the present case involved a contract for services, the Court had to look elsewhere. To determine if the modification met the standard of good faith, the Court looked to §89(a) of the Restatement Second of Contracts. The criteria of §89(a) are:

- The modification was made before the contract was fully performed by either side
- The circumstances prompting the modification were unanticipated by the parties
- The modification is fair and equitable

Applying the criteria of the Restatement (as well as a fourth criteria of voluntariness) to the present case, the court found that the unexpected increase of dwellings in the city (400 in a year as opposed to the usual 20–25) was unanticipated, that Murray had not yet completely performed his five-year contract, and that the additional $10,000 was a fair price for the additional services. The court accordingly upheld the contract.

== Significance ==
Angel v. Murray presents an exception to the pre-existing duty rule that would have normally required Maher to collect all of the refuse for the same pay. The case is an example of the somewhat amorphous "unanticipated circumstances" exception to the pre-existing duty rule when courts will often invalidate contract modifications based on economic duress.

== See also ==
- Williams v Roffey Bros
