= Harris v Watson =

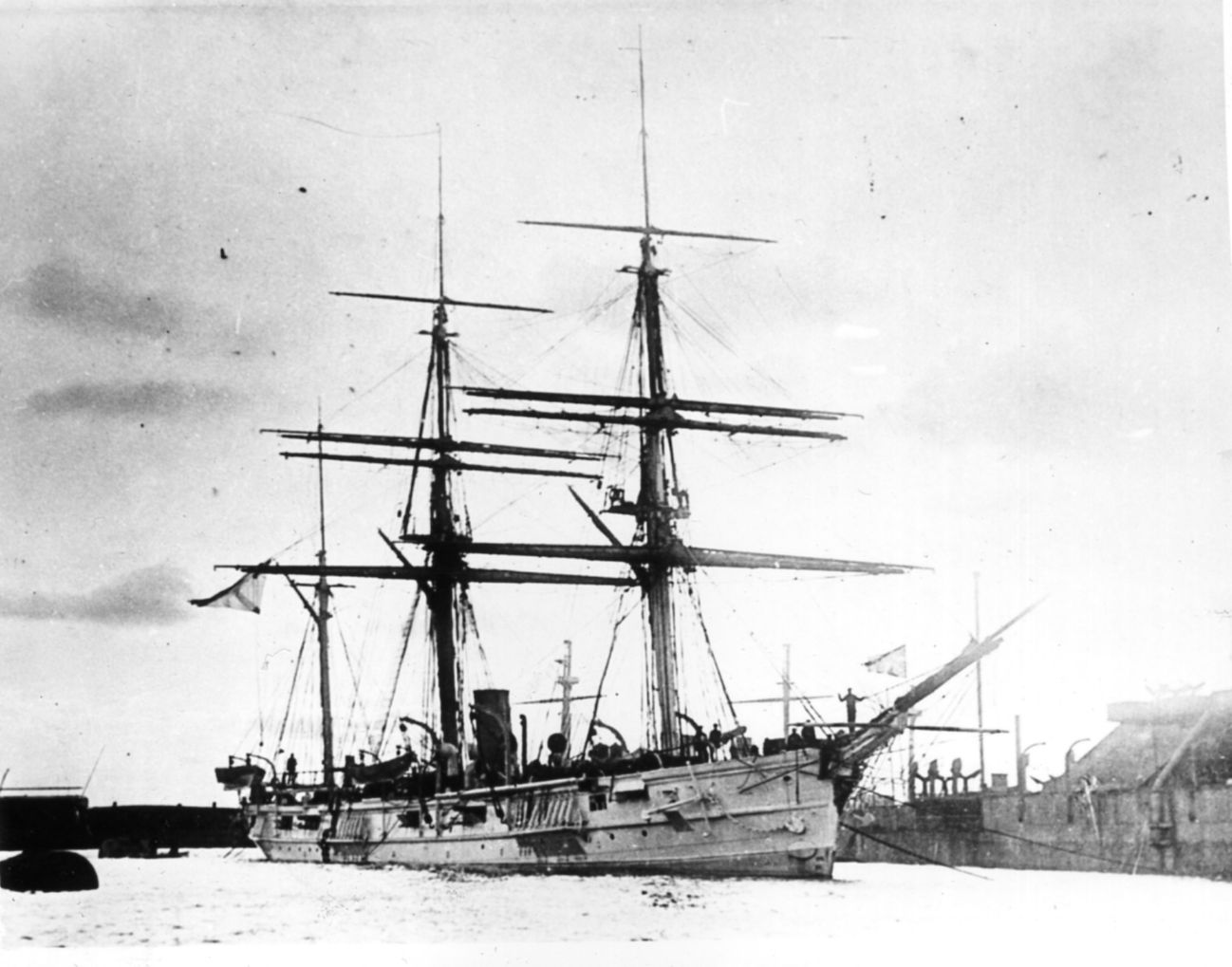
- Court: King's Bench Division
- Decided: 1791
- Citation: (1791) Peake 102.

Court membership
- Judge sitting: Lord Kenyon

Keywords
- Consideration, Public Policy

Harris v. Watson was a 1791 case regarding sailors' wages.

The plaintiff was a seaman on board the ship Alexander, of which the defendant was master and commander. The Alexander was bound on a voyage to Lisbon, and whilst the ship was on her voyage the defendant, in consideration that the plaintiff would perform some extra work in navigating the ship, promised to pay him five guineas over and above his common wages. The plaintiff proved that the ship had been in danger and that the commander, to induce the seamen to exert themselves had made the promise stated in the declaration.

The issue was whether the reformation of the contract was enforceable.

The reformation of the contract to provide extra wages in exchange for extra work under exigent circumstances was not enforceable for public policy reasons. If such an agreement were enforceable it would enable sailors to act opportunistically while at sea.

Lord Kenyon at 103:

If this action was to be supported, it would materially affect the navigation of this kingdom. It has been long since determined, that when the freight is lost, the wages are also lost. This rule was founded on a principle of policy, for if sailors were in all events to have their wages, and in times of danger entitled to insist on an extra charge on such a promise as this, they would in many cases suffer a ship to sink, unless the captain would pay any extravagant demand they might think proper to make.

== See also ==
- Stilk v Myrick
- Hartley v Ponsonby
- English Contract Law
