= Consideration under American law =

Concept in common law as applied in the US

Consideration is the central concept in the common law of contracts and is required, in most cases, for a contract to be enforceable. Consideration is the price one pays for another's promise. It can take a number of forms: money, property, a promise, the doing of an act, or even refraining from doing an act. In broad terms, if one agrees to do something he was not otherwise legally obligated to do, it may be said that he has given consideration. For example, Jack agrees to sell his car to Jill for $100. Jill's payment of $100 (or her promise to do so) is the consideration for Jack's promise to give Jill the car, and Jack's promise to give Jill the car is consideration for Jill's payment of $100.

== Elements ==
The Restatement (Second) of Contracts states that the elements of consideration are as follows:

1. A performance or a return promise must be bargained for.

2. A performance or return promise is bargained for if it is sought by the promisor in exchange for his promise and is given by the promisee in exchange for that promise.

3. The performance may consist of an act other than a promise, or a forbearance, or the creation, modification, or destruction of a legal relation.

An example of this is renting an apartment. The landlord and tenant come together to discuss the terms of the exchange (most of the time, the leasing is outlined in a contract). Thus, they have fulfilled the first requirement of consideration. To meet the second element, there must be a mutual exchange. In this case, the landlord provides housing, while the tenant provides rent payment. Third, the bargain terms must be of value. The apartment is worth what the tenant hands over each month. Therefore, this contract has met its consideration requirement, because it fits all elements of consideration.

== Lack of consideration ==
- Past consideration is not valid. Something that is already done is done, and it does not change the legal position of the promisor. Any goods or services to be exchanged must be exchanged at or after the time of contract formation.
- Preexisting duty does not count as consideration.
- An illusory promise, or one which the promisor actually has no obligation to keep, does not count as consideration. The promise must be real and unconditional. This doctrine rarely invalidates contracts; it is a fundamental doctrine in contract law that courts should try to enforce contracts whenever possible. Accordingly, courts will often read implied-in-fact or implied-in-law terms into the contract, placing duties on the promisor. For instance, if a promisor promises to give away a third of his earnings for the year and earns nothing, he has no actual obligation to do anything.

== Exceptions to the requirement ==
Modern contract theory has also permitted remedies on alternative theories such as promissory estoppel. Also, modifications to existing lease agreements (as opposed to the creation of a new lease agreement) do not require consideration, nor do modifications to existing sale contracts. Furthermore, a promise to perform a moral obligation—the classic example is of a promise to support a person injured while coming to the rescue of the promisor—is enforceable provided the promissee was harmed in conferring a benefit on the promisor and the promise is not disproportionate to the benefit. The promise to pay a debt discharged by bankruptcy, the promise to perform a conditional responsibility despite the nonoccurrence of the condition, and the promise to perform on a voidable contract form a category of moral obligations that can bind in the absence of consideration.

== Contract modification ==
Service contracts and, in the United States, other contracts not governed by the Uniform Commercial Code, generally require consideration to modify a contract (because of what is called the pre-existing duty rule).

== Theories ==
There are two common theories that attempt to explain consideration. The first is "benefit-detriment theory," in which a contract must be either to the benefit of the promisor or to the detriment of the promisee to constitute consideration (though detriment to the promisee is the essential and invariable test of the existence of a consideration rather than whether it can be constituted by benefit to the promisor). The second is "bargain theory," in which the parties subjectively view the contract to be the product of an exchange or bargain. Bargain theory has largely replaced benefit-detriment theory in modern contract theory, but judges often cite both and may use both models in their decisions. These theories usually overlap; in standard contracts, such as a contract to buy a car, there will be both an objective benefit and detriment. However, there are certain contracts which satisfy one but not the other. For instance, a deal in which the promisee feels subjectively relieved, but has not actually gained any legal rights, might satisfy the bargain theory but not the benefit-detriment theory. Alternatively, a deal in which an actor takes detrimental actions possibly in reaction to an offer, without having viewed the deal as a bargain, would not be viewed as a contract under the law.

The main purpose of the shift from benefit-detriment to bargain theory is to avoid inquiries into whether consideration is adequate. For example, if a person promised you their car for $1.00 because they needed to get rid of it, then the $1.00 might seem adequate. However, if it were your birthday and your friend wrote down "I give you my car in consideration of one dollar," this same consideration would not seem adequate. Thus whether $1.00 is consideration does not depend on the benefit received but whether the $1.00 had actually been bargained for.

In some jurisdictions, contracts calling for such nominal or "peppercorn" consideration will be upheld unless a particular contract is deemed unconscionable. However, in other jurisdictions, the court will reject "consideration" that had not been truly bargained for. Occasionally the courts in these jurisdictions may refer to "adequate" or "valuable" consideration, but in reality the court is not examining the adequacy of consideration, but whether it had been bargained for. The traditional notion that courts won't look into the adequacy of consideration, an ancient notion in the English common law, doesn't square with the benefit-detriment theory (in which courts are implicitly analyzing if the parties are receiving a sufficient benefit) but does square with the bargain theory (in which only the subjective intentions of the parties are considered).

== Purposes ==
There are three main purposes cited for the consideration requirement. The first is the cautionary requirement - parties are more likely to look before they leap when making a bargain than when making an off-the-cuff promise of a gift. The second is the evidentiary requirement - parties are more likely to commemorate, or at least remember, a promise made due to a bargaining process. The third is the channeling requirement - parties are more likely to coherently stipulate their specific desires when they are forced to bargain for them. Each of these rationales ensure that contracts are made by serious parties and are not made in error.

== See also ==
- US contract law
- English contract law
- Consideration in English law
