= Stilk v Myrick =

English contract law case

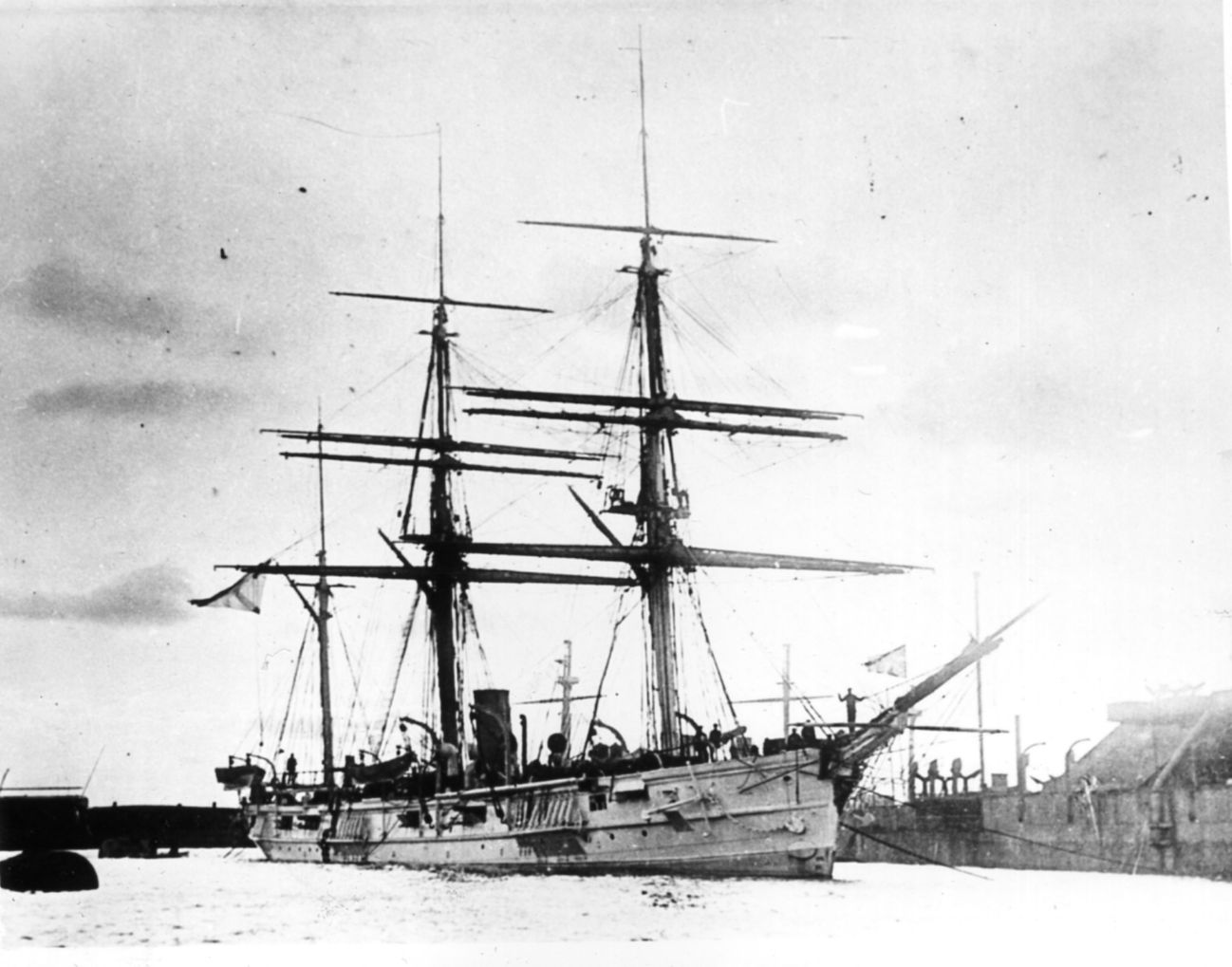
- Court: Court of King's Bench
- Decided: 16 December 1809
- Citation: [1809] EWHC KB J58; (1809) 2 Camp 317, 170 ER 1168; (1809) 6 Esp 129, 170 ER 851.
- Transcript: Full text of judgment

Court membership
- Judge sitting: Lord Ellenborough

Keywords
- Consideration

Stilk v Myrick [1809] EWHC KB J58 is an English contract law case heard in the King's Bench on the subject of consideration. In his verdict, the judge, Lord Ellenborough decided that in cases where an individual was bound to do a duty under an existing contract, that duty could not be considered valid consideration for a new contract. It's Ratio decidendi was limited by Williams v Roffey Bros & Nicholls (Contractors) Ltd in which the Court of Appeal suggested that it ‘involved circumstances of a very special nature’ and that ‘[t]here were strong public policy grounds at that time to protect the master and owners of a ship’ (per Purchas LJ). It was also suggested that situations formerly handled by consideration could instead be handled by the doctrine of economic duress.

== Facts ==
Stilk was contracted to work on a ship owned by Myrick for £5 a month, promising to do anything needed in the voyage regardless of emergencies. After the ship docked at Cronstadt two men deserted, and after failing to find replacements the captain promised the crew the wages of those two men divided between them if they fulfilled the duties of the missing crewmen as well as their own. After arriving at their home port the captain refused to pay the crew the money he had promised to them.

The defence, represented by Garrow, argued that the agreement between the captain and the sailors or seamen

was contrary to public policy, and utterly void. In West India voyages, crews are often thinned greatly by death and desertion; and if a promise of advanced wages were valid, exorbitant claims would be set up on all such occasions. This ground was strongly taken by Lord Kenyon in Harris v Watson, Peak. Cas. 72, where that learned Judge held, that no action would lie at the suit of a sailor on a promise of a captain to pay him extra wages, in consideration of his doing more than the ordinary share of duty in navigating the ship; and his Lordship said, that if such a promise could be enforced, sailors would in many cases suffer a ship to sink unless the captain would accede to any extravagant demand they might think proper to make.

The lawyers for the plaintiff unsuccessfully tried distinguishing that unlike Harris, the captain had voluntarily offered the extra money, rather than being pressured by the crewmen.

== Judgment ==
There are two reports of this case: Campbell's report (1809) 2 Camp 317, 170 ER 1168 and Espinasse's report (1809) 6 Esp 129, 170 ER 851. Campbell's report is generally taken as more authoritative. Whereas Espinasse's report made no mention of consideration, Campbell's report quoted Lord Ellenborough as remarking:

I think Harris v Watson was rightly decided; but I doubt whether the ground of public policy, upon which Lord Kenyon is stated to have proceeded, be the true principle on which the decision is to be supported. Here, I say, the agreement is void for want of consideration. There was no consideration for the ulterior pay promised to the mariners who remained with the ship. Before they sailed from London they had undertaken to do all that they could under all the emergencies of the voyage. They had sold all their services till the voyage should be completed. If they had been at liberty to quit the vessel at Cronstadt, the case would have been quite different; or if the captain had capriciously discharged the two men who were wanting, the others might not have been compellable to take the whole duty upon themselves, and their agreeing to do so might have been a sufficient consideration for the promise of an advance of wages. But the desertion of a part of the crew is to be considered an emergency of the voyage as much as their death; and those who remain are bound by the terms of their original contract to exert themselves to the utmost to bring the ship in safety to her destined port. Therefore, without looking to the policy of this agreement, I think it is void for want of consideration, and that the plaintiff can only recover at the rate of £5 a month.

Contract law scholar Grant Gilmore has argued that Lord Ellenborough's focus on consideration doctrine, as opposed to the public policy rationale of Harris, was attributable to the King's Bench's ongoing efforts to repudiate Lord Mansfield's conflation of consideration with moral obligations.

== Significance ==
Modern commentators say that the decision by the judge not to award the money to the plaintiffs was based at least partly on public policy; should he have done so it would have created precedent that would risk crew members blackmailing captains into giving them more money. It is accepted that the decision would likely be different if it was made in modern times: because of the doctrine of economic duress it would be difficult for such blackmail to be enforced in court. In Hartley v Ponsonby it was held that where a remaining crew were required to do something extra, beyond the scope of their contracts (which unlike in Stilk did not require performance in all emergencies) that the promise of extra pay could be enforced. Another exception to the rule that performing a pre-existing contractual duty is not valid consideration for a new agreement was created in Williams v Roffey Bros & Nicholls (Contractors) Ltd [1991] 1 QB 1 which decided that in such situations the court will be quick to find consideration, if "practical benefits" are given from one to another party. The practical benefit doctrine was extended by the Court of Appeal to a lease agreement which involved the payer of a lesser sum in Rock Advertising Ltd v MWB Business Exchange Centres Ltd, but the Supreme Court overturned this decision on other grounds.

== See also ==
- English contract law
- Uniform Commercial Code section 2-209(1)

== Bibliography ==
Books

- Poole, Jill (2004). Textbook on Contract Law (7th ed.). Oxford University Press. ISBN 0-19-926060-5.
- McKendrick, Ewan (2007). Contract Law (7th ed.). Palgrave Macmillan. ISBN 0-230-01883-1.

Articles

- P Luther, 'Campbell, Espinasse and the Sailors' (1999) 19 Legal Studies 526
- M Chen-Wishart, 'Consideration: Practical Benefit and the Emperor's New Clothes' in J Beatson and D Friedmann, Good Faith and Fault in Contract Law (1995) 123
