= International Business Machines Corp. v. Papermaster =

2008 trade secret case law

IBM v. Papermaster
- Court: United States District Court for the Southern District of New York
- Full case name: International Business Machines Corporation v. Mark D. Papermaster
- Decided: November 21, 2008
- Docket nos.: 7:08-cv-09078
- Citation: 2008 U.S. Dist. LEXIS 95516

Court membership
- Judge sitting: Kenneth M. Karas

Case opinions
- Motion for preliminary injunctive relief granted

Keywords
- non-compete clause, trade secret

In 2008, Mark Papermaster, IBM's Vice President of the Blade Development Unit, became the subject of a notable trade secret misappropriation and non-compete clause case when he announced a plan to move to Apple as Senior Vice President of Devices Hardware Engineering. On October 22, 2008, IBM filed a complaint against Papermaster claiming breach of contract and misappropriation of trade secrets. They sought a preliminary injunction to prevent Papermaster from working at Apple, claiming his employment violated non-competition agreement.

== Case ==
=== Background and hiring ===
In October 2007, Apple started looking for a top-level executive to work under their Senior VP, iPod Division and eventually move into the Senior VP role, reporting directly to then CEO Steve Jobs. Although it interviewed him, Apple did not find Mark Papermaster to be the right fit at the time.

In April 2008, Apple bought P.A. Semi, a microchip design company, with the intent of using the company's chips on Apple's iPods and iPhones. In the microprocessor industry, P.A. Semi and IBM were direct competitors. Five months later, after the release of new versions of the iPod and the iPhone, Apple picked up the search for a Senior VP, iPod/iPhone Division to replace Tony Fadell. Papermaster interviewed again in October, and Apple offered him the position on October 10, 2008. Papermaster accepted, told IBM he planned to accept on October 13, 2008, and notified them of acceptance on October 20, 2008. IBM offered Papermaster a raise if he agreed to stay or one year's salary if he delayed starting at Apple for one year. Papermaster declined the offer and submitted his formal resignation the next day.

=== Restraining order ===
IBM did not learn until the first hearing that Papermaster had already started working for Apple, and immediately filed for a restraining order to enjoin him from continuing to work. Judge Kenneth Karas of the United States District Court in the Southern District of New York heard the case and granted IBM's request. Before releasing the public opinion, Judge Karas ruled that IBM must pay a $3,000,000 bond to Papermaster for any costs or damages that Papermaster might incur, meanwhile still unable to work at Apple.

=== Inevitable disclosure ===
IBM argued that the appointment would cause it irreparable harm through inevitable disclosure and misappropriation of trade secrets. IBM claimed that because of the information Papermaster had access to, including trade secrets, there was "substantial risk of Mr. Papermaster disclosing this information to IBM's detriment" which would result in irreparable harm. They argued inevitable disclosure, stating that because of Papermaster's position and responsibilities at Apple it was inevitable for him to apply knowledge learned at IBM to his work at Apple, thus aiding a competitor and harming IBM. Papermaster claimed that he could recall only two inconsequential areas in which Apple was, and only temporarily, in direct competition with IBM. Industry analysis disagreed and found Apple and IBM to be direct competitors. Papermaster had signed the non-competition agreement which clearly stated that any breach of the agreement would cause irreparable harm. Judge Karas also found that, "Because Mr. Papermaster has been inculcated with some of IBM's most sensitive and closely-guarded technical and strategic secrets, it is no great leap for the Court to find that Plaintiff has met its burden of showing likelihood of irreparable harm." This is also despite an employment agreement Papermaster signed with Apple which stated explicitly that he would not disclose trade secrets from prior employers. Karas writes that the Court doesn't believe Papermaster would act "dishonorably" but that he couldn't help but inadvertently share some information that could be considered a trade secret.

=== Enforceability of non-competition agreement ===
The court also considered whether or not the non-competition agreement itself was reasonable and therefore enforceable. Karas found that, given IBM's international business, the geographic scope was necessary and the time restriction of one year was reasonable. Additionally, because of the similarity of the position at Apple to his work at IBM, the agreement was needed to prevent incidental misappropriation of IBM trade secrets. Critics believe the opinion could have repercussions such as "expanding inevitable disclosure doctrine" to the detriment of anybody attempting to further their career in a particular field by moving to another company in the same industry.

In considering whether or not the non-compete clause caused undue hardship to Papermaster, the Court weighed the agreement with IBM against the once-in-a-lifetime opportunity of the SVP position. Judge Karas concluded that, since intellectual property is IBM's most valued asset, the cost of trade secret disclosure to IBM outweighed the cost to Papermaster in delaying the opportunity. The case was set to go to trial.

=== Settlement ===
On 27 January 2009 it was announced that Papermaster's lawsuit with IBM had been settled and that he'd take over Senior Vice President of Devices Hardware Engineering at Apple on 24 April 2009, replacing Tony Fadell, who stepped down some months earlier. The settlement requires that Papermaster make two scheduled court certifications – the first having occurred in July 2009 and another in October 2009 – to testify that he will protect IBM trade secrets. Apple and IBM reached a settlement, where "Papermaster could only work for Apple after a six month unpaid vacation."

== See also ==
- Wallace v. International Business Machines Corp. et al.
