= Rock Advertising Ltd v MWB Business Exchange Centres Ltd =

2018 UK Supreme Court decision on contract law

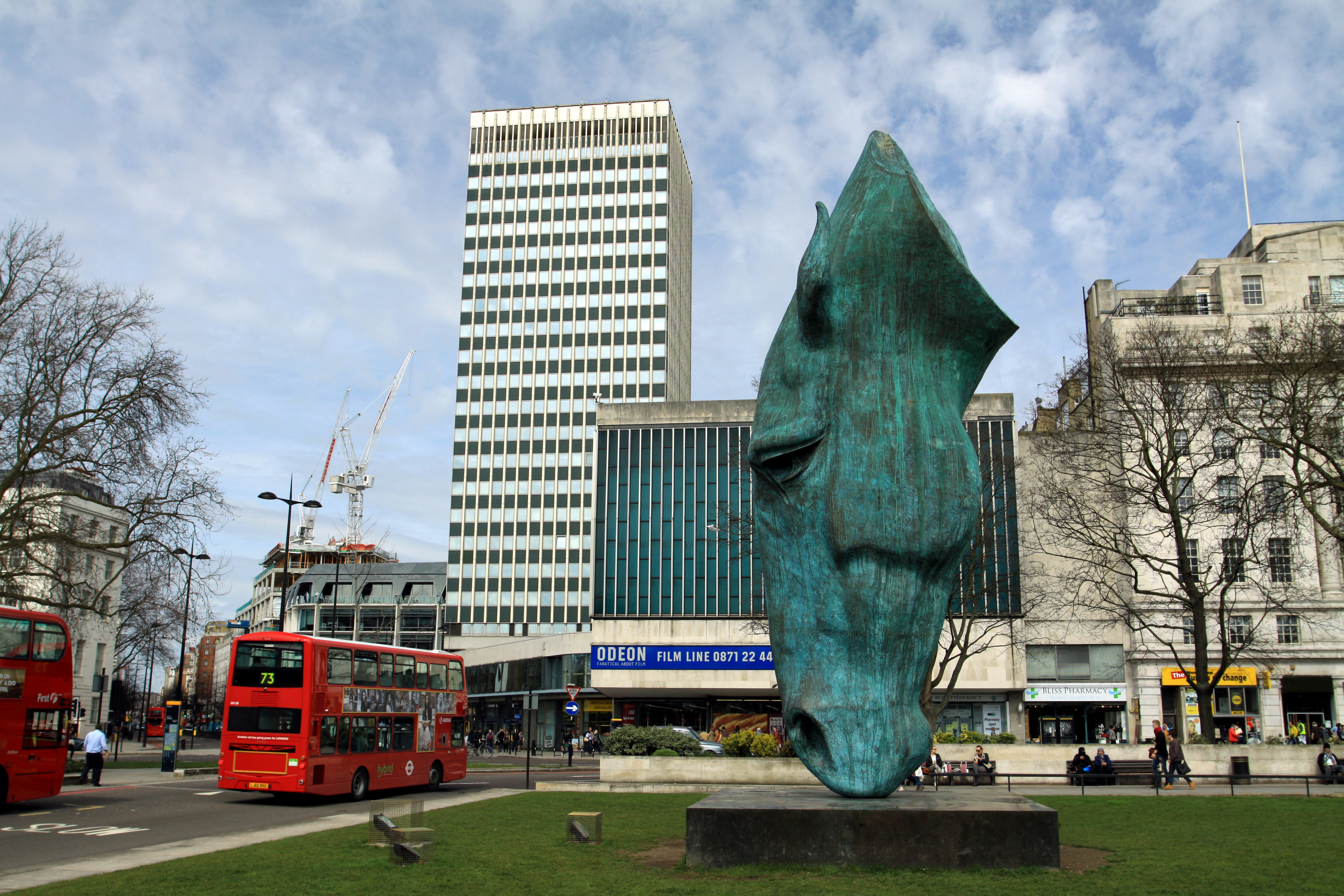
- Marble Arch Tower, in the background
- Court: UK Supreme Court
- Citation: [2018] UKSC 24

Case history
- Prior action: [2016] EWCA Civ 553

Keywords
- Consideration, no oral variation clause

Rock Advertising Ltd v MWB Business Exchange Centres Ltd [2018] UKSC 24 is a judicial decision of the Supreme Court of the United Kingdom relating to contract law, concerning consideration and estoppel. Specifically it concerned the effectiveness of "no oral variation" clauses, which provide that any amendments or waiver in relation to the contract must be in writing.

== Facts ==
Rock Advertising Ltd. claimed that it should not have been locked out of a building, owned by MWB Ltd., because it had renegotiated arrears for rent and paid £3500 under it. MWB Ltd. argued that in any event the renegotiated deal would be unenforceable, because there Rock Advertising Ltd. agreed there would be "no oral variation" of the written deal, and there was no consideration for a change. MWB Ltd. licensed its office space at Marble Arch Tower in Bryanston Street, London, to Rock Advertising Ltd., but after Rock Advertising Ltd. requested more space it fell into arrears for fees and charges. MWB locked out Rock Advertising and gave notice, as it could under the contract. Rock Advertising claimed its exclusion was wrongful, because it had an oral agreement with MWB's credit controller to reschedule the licence fee payments to clear the arrears, and it had paid £3500 that day under it. MWB denied any agreement, and argued it was unenforceable for lacking consideration, and oral agreements were prohibited in the written contract clause 7.6, which said that the written agreement was the entire agreement and no other representations could become part of it.

HHJ Moloney QC held MWB had agreed to the variation, there was adequate consideration, but the written agreement precluded an oral agreement.

== Judgment ==
=== Court of Appeal ===
Kitchin LJ held that the anti-oral variation clause did not preclude any variation, a powerful consideration being party autonomy. A subsequent variation meant the written clause was ineffective. Moreover, if one party derives a benefit from a promise to pay more money, that will be consideration (Williams v Roffey Bros). The payment of £3,500 and the promise for further payments constituted sufficient consideration. So the oral variation was binding for as long as payments were made.

61. Drawing the threads to together, it seems to me that all of these cases are best understood as illustrations of the broad principle that if one party to a contract makes a promise to the other that his legal rights under the contract will not be enforced or will be suspended and the other party in some way relies on that promise, whether by altering his position or in any other way, then the party who might otherwise have enforced those rights will not be permitted to do so where it would be inequitable having regard to all of the circumstances. It may be the case that it would be inequitable to allow the promisor to go back upon his promise without giving reasonable notice, as in the Tool Metal case; or it may be that it would be inequitable to allow the promisor to go back on his promise at all with the result that the right is extinguished. All will depend upon the circumstances. It follows that I do not for my part think that it can be said, consistently with the authorities, including, in particular, the decisions of the House of Lords in Foakes v Beer and this court in In re Selectmove, that in every case where a creditor agrees to accept payment of a debt by instalments, and the debtor acts upon that agreement by paying one of the instalments, and the creditor accepts that instalment, then it will necessarily be inequitable for the creditor later to go back upon the agreement and insist on payment of the balance. Again, all will depend upon the circumstances.

McCombe LJ agreed with both. Arden LJ concurred and gave further reasons.

=== Supreme Court ===
The Supreme Court held that clause 7.6 precluded Rock Advertising from arguing that another oral agreement changed the terms of the written agreement on the facts.

Lord Sumption said the following:

5. The Court of Appeal (Arden, Kitchin and McCombe LJJ) overturned him: [2017] QB 604. They agreed that the variation was supported by consideration, but they considered that the oral agreement to revise the schedule of payments also amounted to an agreement to dispense with clause 7.6. It followed that MWB were bound by the variation and were not entitled to claim the arrears at the time when they did.

6. It is convenient to start with the question on which the courts below disagreed, namely the legal effect of clause 7.6.

7. At common law there are no formal requirements for the validity of a simple contract. The only exception was the rule that a corporation could bind itself only under seal, and what remained of that rule was abolished by the Corporate Bodies Contracts Act 1960. The other exceptions are all statutory, and none of them applies to the variation in issue here. The reasons which are almost invariably given for treating No Oral Modification clauses as ineffective are (i) that a variation of an existing contract is itself a contract; (ii) that precisely because the common law imposes no requirements of form on the making of contracts, the parties may agree informally to dispense with an existing clause which imposes requirements of form; and (iii) they must be taken to have intended to do this by the mere act of agreeing a variation informally when the principal agreement required writing. All of these points were made by Cardozo J in a well-known passage from his judgment in the New York Court of Appeals in Beatty v Guggenheim Exploration Co (1919) 225 NY 380, 387-388:

“Those who make a contract, may unmake it. The clause which forbids a change, may be changed like any other. The prohibition of oral waiver, may itself be waived. ‘Every such agreement is ended by the new one which contradicts it’ (Westchester Fire Insurance Co v Earle 33 Mich 143, 153). What is excluded by one act, is restored by another. You may put it out by the door; it is back through the window. Whenever two men contract, no limitation self-imposed can destroy their power to contract again ...”

8. Part 2 of the United States Uniform Commercial Code introduced a general requirement of writing for contracts of sale above a specified value, coupled with a conditional provision giving effect to No Oral Modification clauses: see sections 2-201, 2-209. But before that there was long-standing authority in support of the rule stated by Cardozo J in New York and other jurisdictions of the United States. It has also been applied in Australia: Liebe v Molloy (1906) 4 CLR 347 (High Court); Commonwealth v Crothall Hospital Services (Aust) Ltd (1981) 54 FLR 439, 447 et seq; GEC Marconi Systems Pty Ltd v BHP Information Technology Pty Ltd (2003) 128 FCR 1. And in Canada: Shelanu Inc v Print Three Franchising Corpn (2003) 226 DLR (4th) 577, para 54 per Weiler JA, citing Colautti Construction Ltd v City of Ottawa (1984) 9 DLR (4th) 265 (CA) per Cory JA. A corresponding principle is applied in Germany: A Müller, Protecting the Integrity of a Written Agreement (2013), 300-305.

9. The English cases are more recent, and more equivocal. In United Bank Ltd v Asif (CA, unreported, 11 Feb 2000), Sedley LJ refused leave to appeal from a summary judgment on the ground that it was “incontestably right” that in the face of a No Oral Modification clause “no oral variation of the written terms could have any legal effect.” The Court of Appeal at an inter partes hearing cited his view and endorsed it. Two years later, in World Online Telecom Ltd v I-Way Ltd [2002] EWCA Civ 413, Sedley LJ’s view had softened. He held (para 12) that it was a sufficient reason for refusing summary judgment that “the law on the topic is not settled.” In Energy Venture Partners Ltd v Malabu Oil and Gas Ltd [2013] EWHC 2118 (Comm), para 273 Gloster LJ declined to decide the point but “incline[d] to the view” that such clauses were ineffective. The same view was expressed, more firmly, but obiter, by Beatson LJ in Globe Motors Inc v TRW Lucas Varity Electric Steering Ltd [2016] 1 CLC 712, paras 101-107, with the support of Moore-Bick and Underhill LJJ. On the other side of this debate, there is a substantial body of recent academic writing in support of a rule which would give effect to No Oral Modification clauses according to their terms: see Jonathan Morgan, “Contracting for self-denial: on enforcing ‘No oral modification’ clauses” (2017) 76 CLJ 589; E McKendrick, “The legal effect of an Anti-oral Variation Clause”, (2017) 32 Journal of International Banking Law and Regulation, 439; Janet O’Sullivan, “Unconsidered Modifications” (2017) 133 LQR 191.

10. In my opinion the law should and does give effect to a contractual provision requiring specified formalities to be observed for a variation.

11. The starting point is that the effect of the rule applied by the Court of Appeal in the present case is to override the parties’ intentions. They cannot validly bind themselves as to the manner in which future changes in their legal relations are to be achieved, however clearly they express their intention to do so. In the Court of Appeal, Kitchin LJ observed that the most powerful consideration in favour of this view is “party autonomy”: para 34. I think that this is a fallacy. Party autonomy operates up to the point when the contract is made, but thereafter only to the extent that the contract allows. Nearly all contracts bind the parties to some course of action, and to that extent restrict their autonomy. The real offence against party autonomy is the suggestion that they cannot bind themselves as to the form of any variation, even if that is what they have agreed. There are many cases in which a particular form of agreement is prescribed by statute: contracts for the sale of land, certain regulated consumer contracts, and so on. There is no principled reason why the parties should not adopt the same principle by agreement.

12. The advantages of the common law’s flexibility about formal validity are that it enables agreements to be made quickly, informally and without the intervention of lawyers or legally drafted documents. Nevertheless, No Oral Modification clauses like clause 7.6 are very commonly included in written agreements. This suggests that the common law’s flexibility has been found a mixed blessing by businessmen and is not always welcome. There are at least three reasons for including such clauses. The first is that it prevents attempts to undermine written agreements by informal means, a possibility which is open to abuse, for example in raising defences to summary judgment. Secondly, in circumstances where oral discussions can easily give rise to misunderstandings and crossed purposes, it avoids disputes not just about whether a variation was intended but also about its exact terms. Thirdly, a measure of formality in recording variations makes it easier for corporations to police internal rules restricting the authority to agree them. These are all legitimate commercial reasons for agreeing a clause like clause 7.6. I make these points because the law of contract does not normally obstruct the legitimate intentions of businessmen, except for overriding reasons of public policy. Yet there is no mischief in No Oral Modification clauses, nor do they frustrate or contravene any policy of the law.

13. The reasons advanced in the case law for disregarding them are entirely conceptual. The argument is that it is conceptually impossible for the parties to agree not to vary their contract by word of mouth because any such agreement would automatically be destroyed upon their doing so. The difficulty about this is that if it is conceptually impossible, then it cannot be done, short of an overriding rule of law (presumably statutory) requiring writing as a condition of formal validity. Yet it is plain that it can. There are legal systems which have squared this particular circle. They impose no formal requirements for the validity of a commercial contract, and yet give effect to No Oral Modification clauses. The Vienna Convention on Contracts for the International Sale of Goods (1980) has been ratified by 89 states, not including the United Kingdom. It provides by article 11 that a contract of sale “need not be concluded in or evidenced by writing and is not subject to any other requirement as to form.” Nonetheless, article 29(2) provides:

“A contract in writing which contains a provision requiring any modification or termination by agreement to be in writing may not be otherwise modified or terminated by agreement. However, a party may be precluded by his conduct from asserting such a provision to the extent that the other party has relied on that conduct.”

Similarly, article 1.2 of the UNIDROIT Principles of International Commercial Contracts, 4th ed (2016), provides that “nothing in these Principles requires a contract, statement or any other act to be made in or evidenced by a particular form.” Yet article 2.1.18 provides that

“A contract in writing which contains a clause requiring any modification or termination by agreement to be in a particular form may not be otherwise modified or terminated. However, a party may be precluded by its conduct from asserting such a clause to the extent that the other party has reasonably acted in reliance on that conduct.”

These widely used codes suggest that there is no conceptual inconsistency between a general rule allowing contracts to be made informally and a specific rule that effect will be given to a contract requiring writing for a variation.

14. The same point may be made in a purely English context by reference to the treatment of entire agreement clauses, which give rise to very similar issues. Entire agreement clauses generally provide that they “set out the entire agreement between the parties and supersede all proposals and prior agreements, arrangements and understandings between the parties.” An abbreviated form of the clause is contained in the first two sentences of clause 7.6 of the agreement in issue in this case. Such clauses are commonly coupled (as they are here) with No Oral Modification clauses addressing the position after the contract is made. Both are intended to achieve contractual certainty about the terms agreed, in the case of entire agreement clauses by nullifying prior collateral agreements relating to the same subject-matter. As Lightman J put it in Inntrepreneur Pub Co (GL) v East Crown Ltd [2000] 2 Lloyd’s Rep 611, para 7:

“The purpose of an entire agreement clause is to preclude a party to a written agreement from threshing through the undergrowth and finding in the course of negotiations some (chance) remark or statement (often long forgotten or difficult to recall or explain) on which to found a claim such as the present to the existence of a collateral warranty. The entire agreement clause obviates the occasion for any such search and the peril to the contracting parties posed by the need which may arise in its absence to conduct such a search. For such a clause constitutes a binding agreement between the parties that the full contractual terms are to be found in the document containing the clause and not elsewhere, and that accordingly any promises or assurances made in the course of the negotiations (which in the absence of such a clause might have effect as a collateral warranty) shall have no contractual force, save insofar as they are reflected and given effect in that document. The operation of the clause is not to render evidence of the collateral warranty inadmissible in evidence as is suggested in Chitty on Contract 28th ed Vol 1 para 12-102: it is to denude what would otherwise constitute a collateral warranty of legal effect.”

But what if the parties make a collateral agreement anyway, and it would otherwise have bound them? In Brikom Investments Ltd v Carr [1979] QB 467, 480, Lord Denning MR brushed aside an entire agreement clause, observing that “the cases are legion in which such a clause is of no effect in the face of an express promise or representation on which the other side has relied.” In fact there were at that time no cases in which the courts had declined to give effect to such clauses, and the one case which Lord Denning cited J Evans & Son (Portsmouth) Ltd v Andrea Merzario Ltd [1976] 1 WLR 1078) was really a case of estoppel and concerned a different sort of clause altogether. In Ryanair Ltd v SR Technics Ireland Ltd [2007] EWHC 3089 (QB), at paras 137-143, Gray J treated Lord Denning’s dictum as a general statement of the law. But in my view it cannot be supported save possibly in relation to estoppel. The true position is that if the collateral agreement is capable of operating as an independent agreement, and is supported by its own consideration, then most standard forms of entire agreement clause will not prevent its enforcement: see Business Environment Bow Lane Ltd v Deanwater Estates Ltd [2007] L & TR 26 (CA), [2007] EWCA Civ 622, at para 43, and North Eastern Properties Ltd v Coleman [2010] 1 WLR 2715 at paras 57 (Briggs J), 82-83 (Longmore LJ). But if the clause is relied upon as modifying what would otherwise be the effect of the agreement which contains it, the courts will apply it according to its terms and decline to give effect to the collateral agreement. As Longmore LJ observed in the North Eastern Properties Ltd case, at para 82:

“if the parties agree that the written contract is to be the entire contract, it is no business of the courts to tell them that they do not mean what they have said.”

Thus in McGrath v Shah (1989) 57 P & CR 452, 459, John Chadwick QC (sitting as a Deputy Judge of the Chancery Division) applied an entire agreement clause in a contract for the sale of land, where the clause served the important function of ensuring that the contract was not avoided under section 2 of the Law of Property (Miscellaneous Provisions) Act 1989 on the ground that the terms were not all contained on one document. Outside the domain, in some ways rather special, of contracts for the sale of land, in Deepak Fertilisers and Petrochemical Corpn v ICI Chemicals & Polymers Ltd [1998] 2 Lloyd’s Rep 139, 168 (Rix J) and [1999] 1 Lloyd’s Rep 387, para 34 (CA), both Rix J and the Court of Appeal treated the question as one of construction and gave effect to the clause according to its terms. Lightman J did the same in the Inntrepreneur case. Since then, entire agreement clauses have been routinely applied: see Matchbet Ltd v Openbet Retail Ltd [2013] EWHC 3067 (Ch), para 112; Mileform Ltd v Interserve Security Ltd [2013] EWHC 3386 (QB), paras 93-101; Moran Yacht & Ship Inc v Pisarev [2016] 1 Lloyd’s Rep 625 (CA), para 18; First Tower Trustees Ltd v CDS (Superstores International) Ltd [2017] 4 WLR 73, paras 17, 26; Adibe v National Westminster Bank Plc [2017] EWHC 1655 (Ch), para 29; Triple Point Technology Inc v PTT Public Co Ltd [2017] EWHC 2178 (TCC), para 68; ZCCM Investments Holdings Plc v Konkola Copper Mines Plc [2017] EWHC 3288 (Comm), para 21.

15. If, as I conclude, there is no conceptual inconsistency between a general rule allowing contracts to be made informally and a specific rule that effect will be given to a contract requiring writing for a variation, then what of the theory that parties who agree an oral variation in spite of a No Oral Modification clause must have intended to dispense with the clause? This does not seem to me to follow. What the parties to such a clause have agreed is not that oral variations are forbidden, but that they will be invalid. The mere fact of agreeing to an oral variation is not therefore a contravention of the clause. It is simply the situation to which the clause applies. It is not difficult to record a variation in writing, except perhaps in cases where the variation is so complex that no sensible businessman would do anything else. The natural inference from the parties’ failure to observe the formal requirements of a No Oral Modification clause is not that they intended to dispense with it but that they overlooked it. If, on the other hand, they had it in mind, then they were courting invalidity with their eyes open.

16. The enforcement of No Oral Modification clauses carries with it the risk that a party may act on the contract as varied, for example by performing it, and then find itself unable to enforce it. It will be recalled that both the Vienna Convention and the UNIDROIT model code qualify the principle that effect is given to No Oral Modification clauses, by stating that a party may be precluded by his conduct from relying on such a provision to the extent that the other party has relied (or reasonably relied) on that conduct. In some legal systems this result would follow from the concepts of contractual good faith or abuse of rights. In England, the safeguard against injustice lies in the various doctrines of estoppel. This is not the place to explore the circumstances in which a person can be estopped from relying on a contractual provision laying down conditions for the formal validity of a variation. The courts below rightly held that the minimal steps taken by Rock Advertising were not enough to support any estoppel defences. I would merely point out that the scope of estoppel cannot be so broad as to destroy the whole advantage of certainty for which the parties stipulated when they agreed upon terms including the No Oral Modification clause. At the very least, (i) there would have to be some words or conduct unequivocally representing that the variation was valid notwithstanding its informality; and (ii) something more would be required for this purpose than the informal promise itself: see Actionstrength Ltd v International Glass Engineering In Gl En SpA [2003] 2 AC 541, paras 9 (Lord Bingham), 51 (Lord Walker).

17. I conclude that the oral variation which Judge Moloney found to have been agreed in the present case was invalid for the reason that he gave, namely want of the writing and signatures prescribed by clause 7.6 of the licence agreement.

18. That makes it unnecessary to deal with consideration. It is also, I think, undesirable to do so. The issue is a difficult one. The only consideration which MWB can be said to have been given for accepting a less advantageous schedule of payments was (i) the prospect that the payments were more likely to be made if they were loaded onto the back end of the contract term, and (ii) the fact that MWB would be less likely to have the premises left vacant on its hands while it sought a new licensee. These were both expectations of practical value, but neither was a contractual entitlement. In Williams v Roffey Bros & Nicholls (Contractors) Ltd [1991] 1 QB 1, the Court of Appeal held that an expectation of commercial advantage was good consideration. The problem about this was that practical expectation of benefit was the very thing which the House of Lords held not to be adequate consideration in Foakes v Beer (1884) 9 App Cas 605: see in particular p 622 per Lord Blackburn. There are arguable points of distinction, although the arguments are somewhat forced. A differently constituted Court of Appeal made these points in In re Selectmove Ltd [1995] 1 WLR 474, and declined to follow Williams v Roffey. The reality is that any decision on this point is likely to involve a re-examination of the decision in Foakes v Beer. It is probably ripe for re-examination. But if it is to be overruled or its effect substantially modified, it should be before an enlarged panel of the court and in a case where the decision would be more than obiter dictum.

== See also ==
- English contract law
