= Moyes & Groves Ltd v Radiation New Zealand Ltd =

Case in New Zealand

- Court: Court of Appeal of New Zealand
- Full case name: Moyes & Groves Ltd v Radiation New Zealand Ltd
- Decided: 10 September 1982
- Citation: [1982] 1 NZLR 368
- Transcript: Court of Appeal judgment High Court judgment

Court membership
- Judges sitting: Cooke P, Somers J, Ongley

Moyes & Groves Ltd v Radiation New Zealand Ltd [1982] 1 NZLR 368 is a cited case in New Zealand regarding whether acts or forbearances in performance of an existing duty are legally enforceable. It reinforces the English case of Hartley v Ponsonby (1857) 7 E & B 872; 119 ER 1471.

== Background ==
In 1974, Radiation NZ ordered some highly specified parts for its washing machine factory with Moyes & Groves, who then ordered the parts from their supplier in India.

For reasons never explained, both parties then forgot about this order for the next 2 years, until, suddenly, the parts arrived at Moyes & Groves. However, the price of the goods from the Indian supplier had increased significantly from $400 to $2700.

Moyes duly advised Radiation that the parts had now arrived, but that if they still wanted them, they would have to pay the new price, or otherwise they would treat the contract as abandoned and they would return the parts to India.

After initially protesting about the proposed price agreement on the basis that the contract purchase was only $400, Radiation reluctantly agreed to the new price.

However, when they received the part, Radiation refused to pay the new price on the basis the new price was the result of economic duress. Moyes countered that due to the 2 years that had passed since the order was placed, they were able to argue that the contract was abandoned, and as a result was able to be legally terminated, which they argued meant that economic duress did not occur here.

== Decision ==
The court ruled that the lapse in time made it "arguable" for Moyes to treat the contract as abandoned (although the court stopped short of actually stating it was legally abandoned), meaning economic duress did not occur, and Radiation were ordered to pay the new price.
