= Wallace v. International Business Machines Corp. =

Case in the development of free software

- Court: United States Court of Appeals for the Seventh Circuit
- Full case name: Daniel Wallace v. International Business Machines Corporation; Red Hat, Inc.; and Novell, Inc.
- Submitted: October 26, 2006
- Decided: November 9, 2006
- Citation: 467 F.3d 1104

Court membership
- Judges sitting: Frank Easterbrook, Michael Stephen Kanne, Terence T. Evans

Case opinions
- Majority: Easterbrook, joined by a unanimous court

Laws applied
- Sherman Antitrust Act

Wallace v. International Business Machines Corp., 467 F.3d 1104 (7th Cir. 2006), was a significant case in the development of free software. The case decided, at the Court of Appeals for the Seventh Circuit, that in United States law the GNU General Public License (GPL) did not contravene federal antitrust laws.

Daniel Wallace, a United States citizen, sued the Free Software Foundation (FSF) for price fixing. In a later lawsuit, he unsuccessfully sued IBM, Novell, and Red Hat. Wallace claimed that free Linux prevented him from making a profit from selling his own operating system.

== FSF lawsuit ==
On April 28, 2005, Daniel Wallace filed suit against the FSF in the U.S. District Court for the Southern District of Indiana, stating that the GPL, by requiring copies of computer software licensed under it to be made available freely, and possibly even at no cost, is tantamount to price fixing. In November 2005 the case was dismissed without prejudice, and Wallace filed multiple amended complaints in an effort to satisfy the requirements of an antitrust allegation. His fourth and final amended complaint was dismissed on March 20, 2006, by Judge John Daniel Tinder, and Wallace was ordered to pay the FSF's costs. In its decision to grant the motion to dismiss, the Court ruled that Wallace had failed to allege any antitrust injury on which his claim could be based, since Wallace was obligated to claim not only that he had been injured but also that the market had. The Court instead found that

[T]he GPL encourages, rather than discourages, free competition and the distribution of computer operating systems, the benefits of which directly pass to consumers. These benefits include lower prices, better access and more innovation.

The Court also noted that prior cases have established that the Sherman Act was enacted to assure customers the benefits of price competition, and have emphasized the act's primary purpose of protecting the economic freedom of participants in the relevant market. This decision thus supports the right of authors and content creators to offer their creations free of charge.

== IBM, Novell, and Red Hat lawsuit ==
In 2006, Daniel Wallace filed a lawsuit against the software companies IBM, Novell, and Red Hat, who profit from the distribution of open-source software, specifically the Linux operating system. Wallace's allegation was that these software companies were engaging in anticompetitive price fixing.

On May 16, 2006, Judge Richard L. Young dismissed the case with prejudice:

Wallace has had two chances to amend his complaint [...]. His continuing failure to state an antitrust claim indicates that the complaint has "inherent internal flaws." [...] Wallace will not be granted further leave to file an amended complaint because the court finds that such amendment would be futile.

Wallace later filed an appeal in the Seventh Circuit Appeal Court, where his case was heard de novo in front of a three-judge panel led by Frank Easterbrook. He lost his appeal, with the judge citing a number of problems with his complaint.

== See also ==
- IBM v. Papermaster
