= Inevitable disclosure =

Legal doctrine of trade secrets and competition

Inevitable disclosure is a legal doctrine through which an employer can claim trade secret to enjoin a former employee from working in a job that may result in the use of trade secrets without the need for proof or evidence.

The inevitable-disclosure doctrine is one's means in demonstrating a revelation of trade secrets, and some have recently found some renewed judicial support. Where it is acceptable, the doctrine allows the court to find that a former employee would disclose proprietary information in their position with a new employer, even if there is no evidence of actual disclosure. Thus, allowing a company to make a critical showing, when it can't do so if required to come forward with evidence of misconduct. However, because it also rests on a prediction about a future harm, inevitable disclosure also is in tension with the general principle that injunctive relief will not be given to prevent a conjectural injury at any means.
