= Mark Papermaster =

American business executive (born 1961)

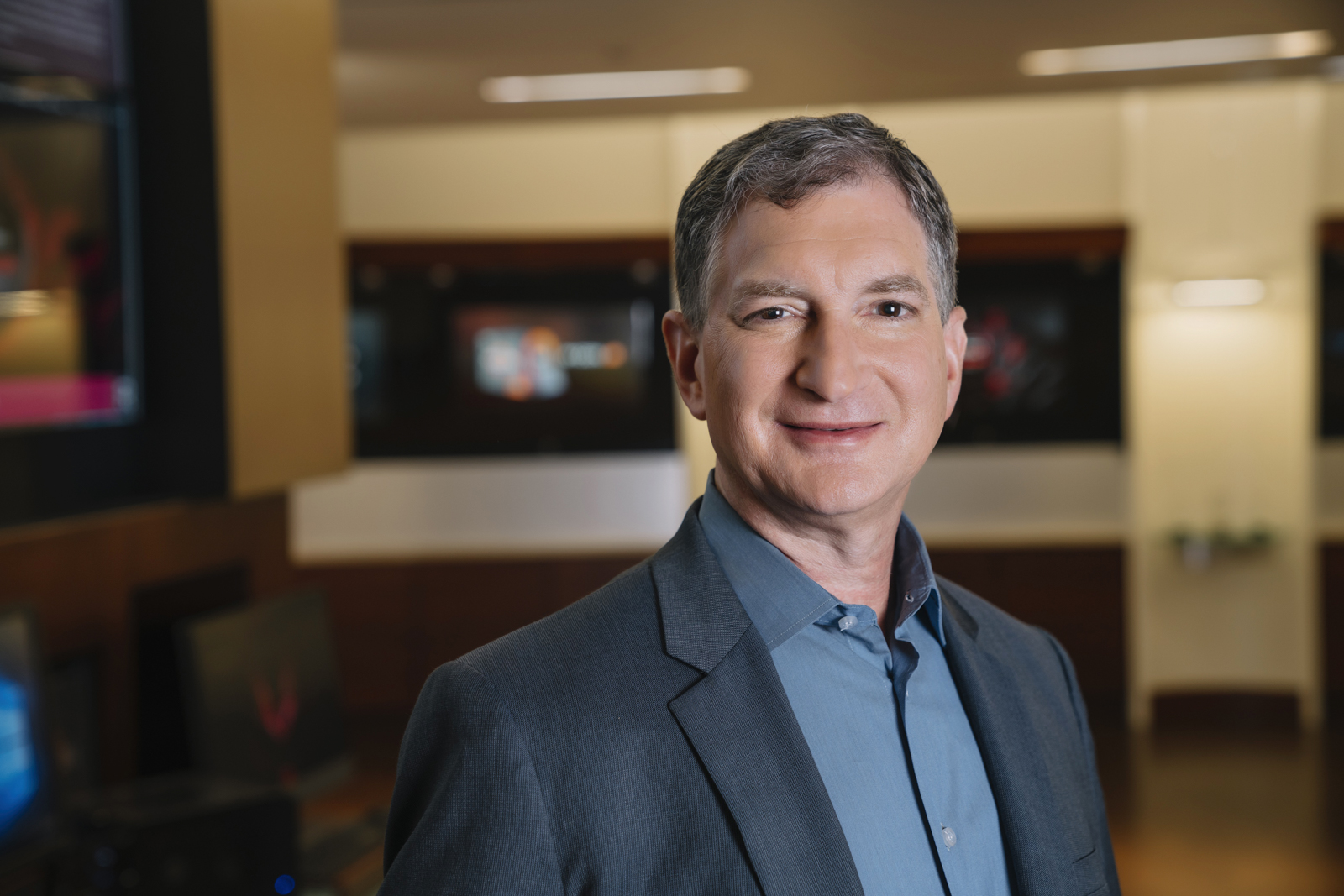
- Born: 1961 (age 64–65)
- Education: University of Texas at Austin (BS); University of Vermont (MS)
- Occupations: Business executive, electrical engineer
- Years active: 1982-present
- Employer(s): Advanced Micro Devices (CTO and Executive Vice President)
- Known for: Microprocessor and product development
- Website: Mark Papermaster - AMD

Mark D. Papermaster (born 1961) is an American business executive who is the chief technology officer (CTO) and executive vice president for technology and engineering at Advanced Micro Devices (AMD). On January 25, 2019 he was promoted to AMD's Executive Vice President.

Papermaster previously worked at IBM from 1982 to 2008, where he was closely involved in the development of PowerPC technology and was two years as vice president of IBM's blade server division. Papermaster's decision to move from IBM to Apple Inc. in 2008 became central to a court case considering the validity and scope of an employee non-compete clause in the technology industry. He became senior vice president of devices hardware engineering at Apple in 2009, with oversight for devices such as the iPhone. In 2010 he left Apple and joined Cisco Systems as a VP of the company's silicon engineering development. Papermaster joined AMD on October 24, 2011, assuming oversight for all of AMD's technology teams and the creation of all of AMD's products, and AMD's corporate technical direction.

== Early life and education ==
Mark D. Papermaster was born in 1961 and grew up in Galveston, Texas. Earning his Bachelor of Science in electrical engineering from the University of Texas in Austin, in 1982 he began working at IBM in Vermont. He earned his Master of Science in electrical engineering from the University of Vermont In 1988.

== Career ==
=== IBM (1982–2008) ===
After beginning his 26-year tenure at IBM in Vermont in 1982, in 1991 Papermaster moved to work with the company in Texas. He initially started designing circuits in the Microelectronics Division, and afterwards “had technical and management assignments in quality, CAD tool applications, and microprocessors.” Promoted to vice president of IBM's Microprocessor Technology Development unit, he was then given oversight for the development of microprocessor and server technologies from 1991 until 2006. During those fifteen years he worked closely with IBM's PowerPC architecture and microprocessor, which Apple had adopted for its line of Macintosh computers. Spending five years working specifically with PowerPC and becoming an expert on IBM Power microprocessors chips and the Power ISA, Wired reports that “Papermaster was a key player in developing the PowerPC chips used in [early] Macs.”

Papermaster moved from microprocessors to become vice president of the Blade Development Unit in October 2006. Becoming head of IBM's blade server unit gave him responsibility for “x86, POWER, storage blades, chassis, network electronics and associated ecosystem.” Also in 2006, IBM selected him to join two executive groups: its Integration & Values Team (I&VT) and its Technical Leadership Team, the latter of which focused on attracting talent.

=== Senior VP at Apple (2009–2010) ===
After being courted as a successor to iPod executive Tony Fadell, Papermaster accepted a position with Apple in 2008. Shortly afterwards, IBM filed a complaint alleging Papermaster had breached a one-year noncompete agreement. Papermaster countersued, arguing that Apple had hired him for his management and engineering abilities, not for insider knowledge of IBM processors. Apple and IBM reached a settlement in January 2009 where "Papermaster could only work for Apple after a six month unpaid vacation."

Papermaster joined Apple on April 24, 2009 as senior vice president of Mobile Devices and Devices Hardware Engineering. Reporting to Steve Jobs, he was given direct oversight of the iPod and iPhone engineering teams, including iPhone hardware development and the June 2010 rollout of the iPhone 4. Although the device proved popular, issues such as a slow release of a white version and reception flaws with the antenna resulted in controversy. The antenna design, a then-unusual device casing that acted as a signal receiver, had been green-lit in late 2009 by Steve Jobs. On August 7, 2010, The New York Times reported that Papermaster was leaving Apple for unconfirmed reasons.

=== VP at Cisco Systems (2010–2011) ===
In November 2010, Papermaster became vice president of the Silicon Switching Technology Group at Cisco Systems. of Cisco's Silicon Engineering Group, he had oversight for Cisco's “silicon strategy, architecture, and development for the company’s switching and routing businesses.” His department also oversaw “chips developed in-house for Cisco's switches,” the ASIC (application specific integrated circuits) chips that go into Cisco products such as the Nexus 7000 data-center switch and the Catalyst line of LAN switches.

=== CTO and executive VP at AMD (2011–present) ===
On October 19, 2011, Advanced Micro Devices (AMD) announced that Papermaster had been appointed its senior vice president (SVP) of Technology & Engineering, as well as its chief technology officer (CTO). He was officially appointed to both roles on October 24, 2011. As SVP of the newly formed Technology & Engineering Group under former CEO Rory Read, Papermaster was given oversight for all of AMD's technology teams. He was also given oversight for all of AMD's products, “corporate technical direction,” and research and development, including system-on-chip (SOC) product design and integrated hardware and software. Papermaster, who had been recruited to AMD by Nick Donofrio, himself hired Jim Keller, and in 2013 Papermaster hired Apple chip designer Raja Koduri, who reported to him directly.

One of his first orders of business was to restructure the CPU design team to build Zen, a new high performance x86 processor core. Under Papermaster, by early 2017 several other new lines of CPUs and graphic processors were under development as well, for example the data center processor EPYC series, which launched in June 2017 with AMD's new Zen (microarchitecture). Ryzen Threadripper high-end desktop processors released in the summer of 2017 also utilized Zen. Also in 2017, Papermaster announced that AMD would continue to develop hardware using both its new Vega graphics architecture and its older Polaris system. At that point he had been heading the company's push into using 7 nm processor nodes, announced as a key component in upcoming Zen and Navi-based processors.

== Speaking and writing ==
Papermaster is periodically asked to comment on industry trends such as Moore's Law Plus, immersive technology, and machine intelligence. He has written articles for TechCrunch on the applicability of Moore's Law, which applies to the pace of semiconductor advancements. He has also written articles for publications such as Dark Reading, ET Tech, Forbes, IEEE Test & Design Magazine, Inc., and Network Computing.

He has also given talks at industry events, for example "How To Build Truly Great Products" at the Design Automation Conference in 2016 and “Evolving Embedded Systems in a Self-Directed World” at Embedded World in 2018. He also spoke at the 2016–2017 Techfest and was a keynote speaker at the Imagination Tech Summit in 2017. In 2017 he spoke at the Strategic Materials Conference, and he also gave a talk on Moore's Law Plus at the IEEE Industry Summit on the Future of Computing in 2017. In April 2018, he spoke at the Congress on the Future of Engineering Software.

== Organizations ==
Papermaster is a member of the Juvenile Diabetes Research Foundation, the Olin College Presidents Council, and the advisory board at Cockrell School of Engineering at the University of Texas. Also at the University of Texas, he has been on the school's electrical and computer engineering advisory council. In 2009, the University of Texas named Papermaster an ECE Fellow for his work with the university. He was included on the Forbes Technology Council as a contributor as of June 2016. In August 2017, he was announced as a new member of the advisory board of the CTO Forum.

== Accolades ==
In 2025, Papermaster was elected to the National Academy of Engineering.
