= Labriola v. Pollard Group, Inc. =

Labriola v. Pollard Group, Inc., 152 Wash.2d 828 (2004), was a case decided by the Supreme Court of Washington that invalidated a modification of an employment contract for an at-will employee which would have added a non-competition agreement because the modification lacked independent consideration.

Anthony A. Labriola worked as a salesperson for the Pollard Group, a commercial print shop in Tacoma, Washington. The case serves as an example of when courts will strictly invoke the pre-existing duty rule in the interests of justice, in this case to protect an at-will employee.
