= Hartley v Ponsonby =

- Court: King's Bench Division
- Citation: [1857] 26 LJ QB 322

Keywords
- Consideration

Hartley v Ponsonby [1857] 26 LJ QB 322 is a leading judgment on the subject of consideration in English contract law. The judgment constituted an amendment to the precedent set by Stilk v Myrick that allowed contractual duties to be considered valid consideration for a future contract if the duties had changed to the extent that the original contract is considered discharged.

== Facts ==
Hartley was contracted to crew a ship owned by Ponsonby. After docking, seventeen of the thirty-six man crew deserted, and only six of the remaining men were competent seamen. With so many crew members missing it was unsafe for the remaining crew to continue the voyage, but they agreed to do so after being promised extra pay once the ship docked. When the ship arrived at the home port, Ponsonby refused to pay the crewmen the extra wages he had promised.

== Judgment ==
Lord Campbell CJ decided that although Stilk v Myrick [1809] EWHC KB J58 said that sailors were not entitled to additional pay for fulfilling a duty already required by an existing contract, they were in this case. The desertion of so many crewmen (compared to the desertion of two crewmen in Stilk v Myrick) changed the nature of the remaining sailors' duties to the point where the contract could be considered discharged. As such the offer by Ponsonby to pay the crew to sail back and the acceptance by the crew could be considered an entirely new contract, providing valid consideration.

== See also ==
- Moyes & Groves Ltd v Radiation New Zealand Ltd
