= Williams v Roffey Bros & Nicholls (Contractors) Ltd =

English contract law case

Williams v Roffey Bros Ltd
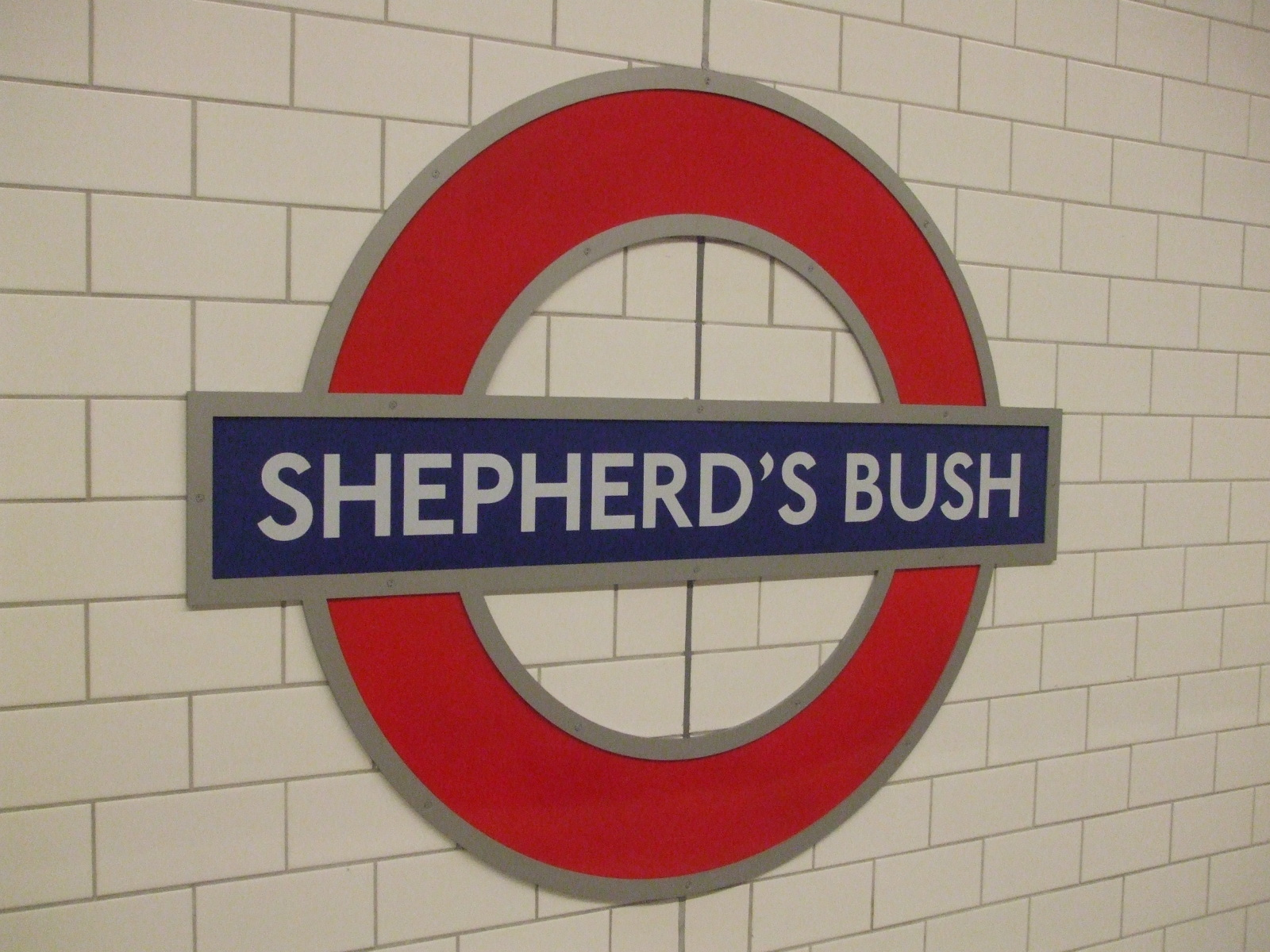
- Court: Court of Appeal
- Full case name: Lester Williams v Roffey Bros & Nicholls (Contractors) Ltd
- Decided: 23 November 1989
- Citation: [1991] 1 QB 1, [1990] 1 All ER 512
- Transcript: Full text of judgment

Court membership
- Judges sitting: Glidewell, Russell and Purchas, LJJ.

Keywords
- Consideration

Williams v Roffey Bros & Nicholls (Contractors) Ltd [1989] EWCA Civ 5 is a leading English contract law case. It decided that in varying a contract, a promise to perform a pre-existing contractual obligation will constitute good consideration so long as a benefit is conferred upon the 'promisor'. This was a departure from the previously established principle that promises to perform pre-existing contractual obligations could not be good consideration.

== Facts ==
Roffey Bros was contracted by Shepherds Bush Housing Association Ltd to refurbish 27 flats at Twynholm Mansions, Lillie Road, London SW6. They subcontracted carpentry to Mr Lester Williams for £20,000 payable in instalments. Some work was done and £16,200 was paid. Then Williams ran into financial difficulty because the price was too low. Roffey Bros was going to be liable under a penalty clause for late completion, so they had a meeting on 9 April 1986 and promised an extra £575 per flat for on time completion. Williams did eight flats and stopped because he had only got £1,500. New carpenters were brought in. Williams claimed.

Mr Rupert Jackson QC held Williams should get the eight times £575 with a few deductions for defects and some of the £2,200 owing from the original sum. He said that they had agreed that the original price was too low, and that raising it to a reasonable level was in both sides' interests.

== Judgment ==
Glidewell LJ held Williams had provided good consideration even though he was merely performing a pre-existing duty. Williams got £3,500 (not full expectation damages). He said that the idea of promissory estoppel was not properly argued and 'not yet been fully developed'. The concept of economic duress provided an answer to Stilk's old problem, that an agreement to perform an existing legal duty cannot constitute good consideration for a new contract. The test for understanding whether a contract could legitimately be varied was set out as follows.

- if A has a contract to employ B for work
- before it is done, A has reason to doubt whether B will, or be able to complete his side of the bargain
- A promises B to pay more
- A 'obtains in practice a benefit, or obviates a disbenefit' from giving the promise
- there is no economic duress or fraud

The practical benefit of timely completion, even though a pre-existing duty is performed, constitutes good consideration. On Stilk v Myrick, Glidewell LJ said,

It is not in my view surprising that a principle enunciated in relation to the rigours of seafaring life during the Napoleonic wars should be subjected during the succeeding 180 years to a process of refinement and limitation in its application to the present day.

However, the principle had not in fact been subjected to any refinement and the three cases he relied on for this proposition - Ward, Williams v Williams and Pao On - unanimously applied it by finding legal consideration (without which the post-contractual modifications would not have been upheld). Glidewell LJ expanded that this test merely refined the Stilk v Myrick principle further but left it unscathed. This is debatable as he held that other practical benefits than those envisaged as the original consideration may per se constitute the requisite good consideration to fulfil the contract (something Stilk v Myrick specifically did not allow). The two cases would until then have been seen as indistinguishable on their facts. or whether he overruled the High Court precedent (later relied on in more senior courts) of Stilk v Myrick.

Russell LJ, giving his own interpretation in the plaintiff's favour held:

The courts nowadays should be more ready to find [consideration’s] existence so as to reflect the intention of the parties to the contract where the bargaining powers are not unequal.

He noted that Roffey Bros' employee, Mr Cottrell had felt the original price to be less than reasonable, and there was a further need to replace the 'haphazard method of payment by a more formalised scheme' of money per flat. "True it was that the plaintiff did not undertake to do any work additional to that which he had originally undertaken to do but the terms upon which he was to carry out the work were varied and, in my judgment, that variation was supported by consideration which a pragmatic approach to the true relationship between the parties readily demonstrates."

Purchas LJ concurred with Glidewell LJ.

== Subsequent cases ==
In Re Selectmove Ltd [1993] EWCA Civ 8 the Court of Appeal considered Williams v Roffey Bros and decided that the principle should not be extended to part payment of debts.

== See also ==
- Pinnel's Case (1602) 5 Co. Rep. 177a
- Stilk v Myrick (1809) 170 ER 1168
- Foakes v Beer (1884)
- Collier v P&MJ Wright (Holdings) Ltd [2007] EWCA Civ 1329
- Uniform Commercial Code, s.2-209
