= List of Welsh statutory instruments =

This is an incomplete list of Welsh statutory instruments. Statutory instruments made by the Assembly are numbered in the main United Kingdom series with their own sub-series. The Welsh language has official equal status with the English language in Wales, so every statutory instrument made by the Assembly is officially published in both English and Welsh. Only the titles of the English-language version are reproduced here. The statutory instruments are secondary legislation, deriving their power from the acts of Parliament establishing and transferring functions and powers to the Welsh Assembly.

== Statutory instruments by year ==
- List of Welsh statutory instruments, 1999

=== 2000–09 ===
- List of Welsh statutory instruments, 2000
- List of Welsh statutory instruments, 2001
- List of Welsh statutory instruments, 2002
- List of Welsh statutory instruments, 2003
- List of Welsh statutory instruments, 2004
- List of Welsh statutory instruments, 2005
- List of Welsh statutory instruments, 2006
- List of Welsh statutory instruments, 2007
- List of Welsh statutory instruments, 2008
- List of Welsh statutory instruments, 2009

=== 2010–2019 ===
- List of Welsh statutory instruments, 2010
- List of Welsh statutory instruments, 2011
- List of Welsh statutory instruments, 2012
- List of Welsh statutory instruments, 2013
- List of Welsh statutory instruments, 2014
- List of Welsh statutory instruments, 2015
- List of Welsh statutory instruments, 2016
- List of Welsh statutory instruments, 2017
- List of Welsh statutory instruments, 2018
- List of Welsh statutory instruments, 2019

=== 2020–present ===
- List of Welsh statutory instruments, 2020
- List of Welsh statutory instruments, 2021
- List of Welsh statutory instruments, 2022
- List of Welsh statutory instruments, 2023
- List of Welsh statutory instruments, 2024
