= List of Welsh statutory instruments, 2013 =

This is an incomplete list of Welsh statutory instruments made in 2013. Statutory instruments made by the Assembly are numbered in the main United Kingdom series with their own sub-series. The Welsh language has official equal status with the English language in Wales so every statutory instrument made by the Assembly is officially published in both English and Welsh. The statutory instruments are secondary legislation, deriving their power from the acts of Parliament establishing and transferring functions and powers to the Welsh Assembly.

== 1-100 ==
- The A55 Trunk Road (Conwy Tunnel, Conwy) (Temporary Traffic Restriction & Prohibitions) Order 2013 (SI 2013/1)
- The A470 Trunk Road (Llanbrynmair, Powys) (Temporary Prohibition of Vehicles) Order 2013 (SI 2013/2)
- The A4076 Trunk Road (South of Johnston, Pembrokeshire) (Temporary Traffic Restrictions & Prohibition) Order 2013 (SI 2013/3)
- The A4042 Trunk Road (Llanellen to Hardwick Gyratory, Abergavenny, Monmouthshire) (Temporary Traffic Restrictions and Prohibitions) Order 2013 (SI 2013/11)
- The A48 and A466 Trunk Roads (High Beech Roundabout, Near Chepstow, Monmouthshire) (Temporary Traffic Restrictions and Prohibition) Order 2013 (SI 2013/12)
