= List of Welsh statutory instruments, 2012 =

This is an incomplete list of statutory instruments of the Welsh Assembly made in 2012. Statutory instruments made by the Assembly are numbered in the main United Kingdom series with their own sub-series. The Welsh language has official equal status with the English language in Wales, so every statutory instrument made by the Assembly is officially published in both English and Welsh. The statutory instruments are secondary legislation, deriving their power from the acts of Parliament establishing and transferring functions and powers to the Welsh Assembly.

== Statutory instruments ==
=== 1-100 ===
- The Mink Keeping (Prohibition) (Wales) Order 2012
- The M4 Motorway (Brynglas Tunnels, Newport) (Temporary Traffic Restriction & Prohibitions) Order 2012 (SI 2012/5)
- The A55 Trunk Road(Conwy Tunnel, Conwy) (Temporary Traffic Restriction & Prohibitions) Order 2012 (SI 2012/6)
- The A4042 Trunk Road (Turnpike Roundabout to Mamhilad Roundabout, Torfaen) (Temporary Traffic Restrictions & Prohibitions) Order 2012 (SI 2012/7)
- The A48 and A40 Trunk Roads (St Clears to Cross Hands, Carmarthenshire) (Temporary Traffic Restrictions and Prohibition) Order 2012 (SI 2012/11)
- The Assembly Learning Grants and Loans (Higher Education) (Wales) (No.2) (Amendment) Regulations 2012 (SI 2012/14)
- The A477 Trunk Road (Kilgetty, Pembrokeshire) (Temporary Traffic Restrictions and Prohibition) Order 2012 (SI 2012/19)
- The A487 Trunk Road (Fishguard, Pembrokeshire) (Temporary Traffic Restrictions and Prohibition) Order 2012 (SI 2012/21)
- The A470 Trunk Road (Coed y Celyn, Conwy) (Temporary Traffic Restrictions and Prohibition) Order 2012 (SI 2012/22)
- The A4060 Trunk Road (Pentrebach, Merthyr Tydfil) (Temporary Prohibition of Vehicles) Order 2012 (SI 2012/23)
- The Welsh Language (Wales) Measure 2011 (Commencement No.2) Order 2012 (SI 2012/46)
- The St Clears to Pembroke Dock Trunk Road (A477) (St Clears – Red Roses Improvement and De-Trunking) Order 2012 (SI 2012/48)
- The A55 Trunk Road (Junction 25 (Bodelwyddan) to Junction 28 (Rhuallt), Denbighshire) (Temporary Traffic Restriction & Prohibitions) Order 2012 (SI 2012/49)
- The Advisory Panel to the Welsh Language Commissioner (Appointment) Regulations 2012 (SI 2012/59)
- The London Olympic Games and Paralympic Games (Advertising and Trading) (Wales) Regulations 2012 (SI 2012/60)
- The Specified Products from China (Restriction on First Placing on the Market) (Wales) (Amendment) Regulations 2012 (SI 2012/64)
- The Landfill Allowances Scheme (Wales) (Amendment) Regulations 2012 (SI 2012/65)

=== 101-200 ===
- The A4232 Trunk Road (St Fagans to Drope Road Over-bridge, Cardiff) (Temporary Traffic Restrictions & Prohibition) Order 2012 (SI 2012/111)
- The A55 Trunk Road (Penmaenbach Tunnel, Conwy County Borough) (Temporary Traffic Restrictions & Prohibitions) Order 2012 (SI 2012/141)
- The A5 Trunk Road (Froncysyllte, Wrexham) (Temporary Traffic Restrictions and Prohibition) Order 2012 (SI 2012/143)
- The A5 Trunk Road (Swallow Falls Hotel to Ty Hyll, Betws y Coed, Conwy) (Temporary Traffic Restrictions and Prohibition) Order 2012 (SI 2012/144)
- THE CARDIFF TO GLAN CONWY TRUNK ROAD (A470) (MAES YR HELMAU TO CROSS FOXES IMPROVEMENT AND DE-TRUNKING) ORDER 2012 (SI 2012/157)
- The A470 Trunk Road (Rhyd-y-Creuau, Betws-y-Coed, Conwy County Borough) (Temporary Traffic Restrictions & Prohibition) Order 2012 (SI 2012/162)
- The A55 Trunk Road (Junction 18 (Llandudno Junction Interchange) to Junction 16 (Puffin Roundabout), Conwy County Borough) (Temporary Traffic Restrictions & Prohibitions) Order 2012 (SI 2012/163)
- The A5 Trunk Road (West of Glyndyfrdwy, Denbighshire) (Temporary Traffic Restrictions & Prohibitions) Order 2012 (SI 2012/165)
- The General Teaching Council for Wales (Functions) (Amendment) Regulations 2012 (SI 2012/166)
- The General Teaching Council for Wales (Additional Functions) (Amendment) Order 2012 (SI 2012/167)
- The General Teaching Council for Wales (Amendment) Order 2012 (SI 2012/168)
- The General Teaching Council for Wales (Constitution) (Amendment) Regulations 2012 (SI 2012/169)
- The General Teaching Council for Wales (Disciplinary Functions) (Amendment) Regulations 2012 (SI 2012/170)
- The Children and Families (Wales) Measure 2010 (Commencement No. 4) Order 2012 (SI 2012/191)
- The Localism Act 2011 (Commencement No. 1) (Wales) Order 2012 (SI 2012/193)
- The A5 Trunk Road (Bron Haul, Conwy) (Temporary Traffic Restrictions and Prohibition) Order 2012 (SI 2012/197)
