= Welsh statutory instrument =

Type of law in Wales

A Welsh statutory instrument (WSI; Welsh: offerynnau statudol Cymru) is subordinate legislation made by the Welsh Ministers, as well as subordinate legislation made by public bodies using powers provided to be exercisable by Welsh statutory instrument. WSIs are the main form of subordinate legislation in Wales, being used by default to exercise powers delegated to the Welsh Ministers, the Counsel General, and the King-in-Council.

The Legislation (Wales) Act 2019 defines what a Welsh statutory instrument is, though the class of legislation known as the "Welsh statutory instrument" was only formally established by the Legislation (Procedure, Publication and Repeals) (Wales) Act 2025. Until this Act, WSIs were governed by the Statutory Instruments Act 1946, which continues to govern UK statutory instruments.

Before Welsh devolution, subordinate legislation applying only to Wales was published as a subseries of the larger UK statutory instrument (SI) series. This subseries is now used for SIs which deal with reserved matters in relation to Wales.

== Purpose ==
An WSI is made, with some exceptions, by a body exercising executive governmental functions – that is, a body responsible for putting the law into effect ("executing" the law) rather than a body responsible for defining the law (the legislature) or a body responsible for interpreting the law (the judicature). As a result, an WSI will provide specific details on how an Act should be put into effect and may amend existing Acts or WSIs to reflect that the law has changed. In other cases, an WSI may repeal parts of the law which had before been impliedly repealed.

For example, section 15 of the Environmental Protection (Single-use Plastic Products) (Wales) Act 2023 allows the Welsh Ministers to make regulations setting out implementation of the single-use plastic ban, and The Environmental Protection (Single-use Plastic Products) (Civil Sanctions) (Wales) Regulations 2023 sets out in regulation 1 how a fixed monetary penalties will be set.

In other cases, an WSI may be used to bring into force parts of the law through so-called "commencement orders." In these cases, sections of Acts may have no legal force until brought into force, which may allow time for accommodating preparations to be made. One example of a commencement order is the Tertiary Education and Research (Wales) Act 2022 (Commencement No. 1) Order 2022, which brought certain provisions of the Tertiary Education and Research (Wales) Act 2022 into force.

Another example, although not involving WSIs, is the Health and Safety at Work etc. Act 1974, which applies to Wales and makes provisions relating to ensuring safety in the workplace. This Act covers a wide remit, and so UK SIs have been issued under the same sections to cover different industries. Specifically, some sections of this Act which allow making SIs were used to make both the Control of Substances Hazardous to Health Regulations 2002 and the Control of Vibration at Work Regulations 2005 even though those regulations are not related.

== Procedure ==
=== Enabling ===
A WSI may only be made where an act or measure of the Senedd, or act of the UK Parliament gives that power. Such an act is known variously as an enabling or parent act, and sets out the scope of the power to make WSIs, and the associated procedure for exercising that power. A WSI may only make provision within the scope of its enabling power, and any provision outside that scope is invalid.

=== Making ===
An WSI is "made" when it is signed by a person or body who has the power to make that WSI – typically the Welsh Ministers. This terminology appears to be inherited from the UK Parliament, as the Senedd has not provided official guidance specifically defining the term.

=== Laying ===
The "laying" of an WSI is the putting of that WSI before the Senedd for the Senedd's consideration. The phrase comes from laying before the house, which originally referred to the placing of a (physical) document on the table in the assembly chamber. All WSIs are required to be laid before Senedd in the manner specified by the Senedd's standing orders, although not laying an WSI before Senedd does not invalidate it. The date an WSI is laid is also generally the date from which parliamentary scrutiny may begin.

=== Scrutiny ===
Once a WSI is laid before the Senedd, it may be scrutinised. Scrutiny is generally performed by the Legislation, Justice and Constitution Committee (LJSC), which considers whether the Welsh Ministers are competent in making the WSI and whether the WSI of sufficient quality. That is, the committee considers whether the Ministers have the power to make that WSI under the enabling Act, whether the Senedd has the power to make law in that area under the Government of Wales Act or Wales Acts, and whether the provisions of the WSI are clear, consistent, and free of typographical errors.

The LJSC and other committees report back to the Senedd, which applies a varying level of scrutiny depending on the exact procedure for that WSI.

==== Negative procedure ====
A negative WSI is an WSI subject to negative procedure. Such WSIs must be laid before the Senedd at least 28 days before they come into force, and may be annulled by Senedd resolution within 40 days of their being laid. If an WSI is annulled after it comes into force, it ceases to have force from the date of annulment.

==== Affirmative procedure ====
An affirmative WSI is subject to affirmative procedure. These WSIs must be approved by resolution of the Senedd before they can come into force.

==== Special parliamentary procedure ====
Some WSIs are subject to special parliamentary procedure. These are so-called special procedure orders (SPOs), and differ from WSIs subject to other types of procedure in that notice of SPOs must be posted in the London Gazette (or a local newspaper, if the SPO relates to a particular area) and in that members of the public may object to an SPO.

If an SPO is objected to, it must be laid before the Senedd with its objections and then confirmed by an Act of Senedd Cymru. If no objections are made, the Senedd may annul the order within 40 days of its being laid. If no objections are made and the Parliament does not annul the SPO, the SPO comes into force at the end of the 40-day period or at a later date if the SPO so specifies.

==== Other procedures ====
Another example of these other procedures are laid-only procedure, where an WSI is laid before the Senedd but cannot be rejected.

=== Commencement ===
An WSI will not typically have legal force immediately. Rather, it may require parliamentary approval, and may specify a "commencement day" on which it comes into force. For example, an order regulating student finance was made on 9 July 2024, laid before the Senedd on 19 July 2024, and has a commencement day of 9 July 2024.

== Types ==
=== Rules, regulations, and orders ===
While WSIs are separate from UK SIs, they generally appear to follow the same naming convention for rules, regulations, and orders. The Welsh Government and the Senedd have not, however, as of October 2016, published official guidance defining the terms, and so it cannot be known with certainty whether the definitions used for WSIs and SIs are identical.

These definitions were established by the so-called "Donoughmore Committee" of 1932, and recommended in official guidance published by Her Majesty's Stationery Office. The committee recommended that:

- Rules should set out procedure – how specific public bodies conduct themselves.
- Regulations should set out substantive law – how members of the public, companies, and so on conduct themselves.
- Orders should exercise executive power, or the power to take judicial decisions.

=== Orders in Council ===
An Order in Council is legislation made by the sovereign to exercise executive power, although in reality Orders are made by the Privy Council and approved by the sovereign. An Order in Council is primary legislation when made under the royal prerogative, and subordinate legislation if made under an Act of Senedd Cymru. When an Order in Council is used to exercise a power granted by an Act, such Orders are made as WSIs.

Orders in Council are often used for making law which modifies how the branches of government work. Orders in Council have been used to adjust how the Senedd works – for example, to set who is disqualified from being a Member of the Senedd – and, in the UK SI series, to devolve powers to the Senedd.

=== Orders of Council ===
An Order of Council is a form of legislation made by the Lords of the Privy Council (in practice, ministers of the Crown).

Orders of Council differ from Orders in Council in that, while orders in Council are orders made by the King meeting with the Privy Council, Orders of Council are made by the Privy Council in its own right and without requiring the King's approval. The preamble of all Orders of Council states that the order was made at a meeting of the council held in Whitehall; however, in practice they are all approved through correspondence, and no meeting is actually held.

Orders of Council that are Welsh statutory instruments generally relate to higher education, for example under the powers in the Education Reform Act 1988 to make provision for the constitution of governing bodies or regulate the granting of degrees.

== Style ==
=== Numbering ===
WSIs are numbered by the year they were made, and consecutively by the order they were received by the King's Printer in that year. Unlike with Acts of the Senedd, where Acts are numbered in exactly the order they are received, there is no such requirement for the numbering of WSIs – an WSI need only be ordered "as nearly as possible" in the order the Queen's Printer receives them.

=== Citation ===
The recommended ways of citing an WSI are by its title – for example, the Education (Student Finance) (Miscellaneous Amendments) (Wales) Regulations 2024 – or by its year and number (e.g. WSI 2024/810). Some style guides recommend the use of both forms in a citation (as in the Agriculture (Wales) Act 2023 (Commencement No. 2) Order 2024, WSI 2024/810 or another similar form).

=== Divisions ===
The parts an WSI is divided into have different names depending on the type of WSI and official guidance has been published by the Welsh Government.

The divisions shown in the table are for the main body matter of the WSI, and the Orders column includes Orders in Council. It is also common, regardless of the traditional name of the division, to refer to a division generally as a "clause," such as in "interpretation clause" (which would provide information on how the instrument is to be interpreted). In addition to these numbered (or lettered) paragraphs, an WSI can contain unnumbered paragraphs.

As with Acts of the Senedd, WSIs can have schedules annexed to them. Schedules to WSIs are divided in the same manner as Acts.

== See also ==
- Act of Senedd Cymru
- List of Welsh statutory instruments
- Delegated legislation in the United Kingdom
