= List of Welsh statutory instruments, 2011 =

This is a complete list of Welsh statutory instruments made in 2011. Statutory instruments made by the Assembly are numbered in the main United Kingdom series with their own sub-series. The Welsh language has official equal status with the English language in Wales so every statutory instrument made by the Assembly is officially published in both English and Welsh. The statutory instruments are secondary legislation, deriving their power from the acts of Parliament establishing and transferring functions and powers to the Welsh Assembly.

== 1-100 ==
- Gorchymyn Cefnffordd yr A458 (Cwm Dugoed, Gwynedd) (Gwahardd Cerbydau Dros Dro) 2011 (WSI 2011 No. 5)
- The A458 Trunk Road (Cwm Dugoed, Gwynedd) (Temporary Prohibition of Vehicles) Order 2011 (WSI 2011 No. 5)
- Gorchymyn Traffordd yr M4 (Cyffordd 44, Lôn-las, Treforys, Abertawe) (Gwahardd Cerbydau Dros Dro) 2011 (WSI 2011 No. 6)
- The M4 Motorway (Junction 44, Lon-Las, Morriston, Swansea) (Temporary Prohibition of Vehicles) Order 2011 (WSI 2011 No. 6)
- Gorchymyn Traffordd yr A48(M) (Llaneirwg, Caerdydd) (Terfyn Cyflymder 50 MYA Dros Dro) 2011 (WSI 2011 No. 7)
- The A48(M) Motorway (St Mellons, Cardiff) (Temporary 50 MPH Speed Limit) Order 2011 (WSI 2011 No. 7)
- Gorchymyn Cefnffordd yr A40/A449 (Cyfnewidfa Rhaglan, Sir Fynwy) (Gwahardd Cerbydau a Beicwyr Dros Dro) 2011 (WSI 2011 No. 8)
- The A40/A449 Trunk Road (Raglan Interchange, Monmouthshire (Temporary Prohibition of Vehicles and Cyclists) Order 2011 (WSI 2011 No. 8)
- Gorchymyn Traffordd yr M4 (Twneli Bryn-glas, Casnewydd) (Cyfyngiad a Gwaharddiadau Traffig Dros Dro) 2011 (WSI 2011 No. 12)
- The M4 Motorway (Brynglas Tunnels, Newport) (Temporary Traffic Restriction & Prohibitions) Order 2011 (WSI 2011 No. 12)
- Gorchymyn Cefnffordd yr A55 (Twnnel Conwy, Conwy) (Cyfyngiad a Gwaharddiadau Traffig Dros Dro) 2011 (WSI 2011 No. 13)
- The A55 Trunk Road (Conwy Tunnel, Conwy) (Temporary Traffic Restriction & Prohibitions) Order 2011 (WSI 2011 No. 13)
- The Water Supply (Water Quality) (Amendment) Regulations 2011 (WSI 2011 No. 14 (W. 7))
- Gorchymyn Cefnffordd yr A55 (Ffordd Ymadael tua'r Dwyrain wrth Gyffordd 10 (Cyfnewidfa Ffordd Caernarfon), Gwynedd) (Gwahardd Cerbydau Dros Dro) 2011 (WSI 2011 No. 15)
- The A55 Trunk Road (Eastbound Exit Slip Road at Junction 10 (Caernarfon Road Interchange), Gwynedd) (Temporary Prohibition of Vehicles) Order 2011 (WSI 2011 No. 15)
- Gorchymyn Traffordd yr M4 (Cyffordd 42 (Earlswood), Castell nedd Port Talbot) (Gwahardd Cerbydau Dros Dro a Chaniatáu Traffig ar y Lleiniau Caled) 2011 (WSI 2011 No. 16)
- The M4 Motorway (Junction 42 (Earlswood), Neath Port Talbot) (Temporary Prohibition of Vehicles & Trafficking of Hard Shoulders) Order 2011 (WSI 2011 No. 16)
- Gorchymyn Cefnffordd yr A40 (Y Gerbytffordd tua'r Gorllewin rhwng Cylchfan Rhaglan a System Gylchu Hardwick, Sir Fynwy) (Gwahardd Cerbydau a Beicwyr Dros Dro) 2011 (WSI 2011 No. 17)
- The A40 Trunk Road (Westbound Carriageway Between Raglan Roundabout and Hardwick Gyratory, Monmouthshire) (Temporary Prohibition of Vehicles & Cyclists) Order 2011 (WSI 2011 No. 17)
- Gorchymyn Cefnffordd yr A48 a Thraffordd yr M4 (Pont Afon Nedd a Thraphont Doc Llansawel, Castell-nedd Port Talbot) (Cyfyngiadau a Gwaharddiadau Traffig Dros Dro) 2011 (WSI 2011 No. 18)
- The A48 Trunk Road & M4 Motorway (River Neath Bridge & Briton Ferry Dock Viaduct, Neath Port Talbot) (Temporary Traffic Restrictions & Prohibitions) Order 2011 (WSI 2011 No. 18)
- Gorchymyn Cefnffordd yr A458 (Pont Reilffordd Cefn, Buttington, Powys) (Gwahardd Cerbydau Dros Dro) 2011 (WSI 2011 No. 24)
- The A458 Trunk Road (Cefn Railway Bridge, Buttington, Powys) (Temporary Prohibition of Vehicles) Order 2011 (WSI 2011 No. 24)
- Gorchymyn Ardaloedd Rheoli Mwg (Lleoedd Tân Esempt) (Cymru) 2011 (WSI 2011 No. 38 (Cy. 13))
- The Smoke Control Areas (Exempted Fireplaces) (Wales) Order 2011 (WSI 2011 No. 38 (W. 13))
- Gorchymyn Cefnffordd yr A470 (Ffynnon Taf i Nantgarw, Rhondda Cynon Taf) (Terfyn Cyflymder 50 MYA Dros Dro) 2011 (WSI 2011 No. 39)
- The A470 Trunk Road (Taffs Well to Nantgarw, Rhondda Cynon Taf) (Temporary 50 MPH Speed Limit) Order 2011 (WSI 2011 No. 39)
- Gorchymyn Cefnffordd yr A4232 (Llanilltern i Groes Cwrlwys, Caerdydd) (Gwahardd Cerbydau Dros Dro) 2011 (WSI 2011 No. 40)
- The A4232 Trunk Road (Capel Llanilltern to Culverhouse Cross, Cardiff) (Temporary Prohibition of Vehicles) Order 2011 (WSI 2011 No. 40)
- Gorchymyn Traffordd yr M4 (Slipffordd Ymadael tua'r Dwyrain, wrth Gyffordd 46 (Llangyfelach), Abertawe) (Gwahardd Cerbydau Dros Dro) 2011 (WSI 2011 No. 43)
- The M4 Motorway (Eastbound Exit Slip Road at Junction 46 (Llangyfelach), Swansea) (Temporary Prohibition of Vehicles) Order 2011 (WSI 2011 No. 43)
- Gorchymyn Cefnffordd yr A55 (Y Slipffordd Ymuno tua'r Dwyrain wrth Gyffordd 8A, Carreg Brân, Pont Britannia, Ynys Môn) (Gwahardd Cerbydau Dros Dro) 2011 (WSI 2011 No. 69)
- The A55 Trunk Road (Junction 8A Eastbound On Slip Road, Carreg Bran, Britannia Bridge, Isle of Anglesey) (Temporary Prohibition of Vehicles) Order 2011 (WSI 2011 No. 69)
- Gorchymyn Cefnffordd yr A55 (Pont Britannia, Gwynedd ac Ynys Môn) (Cyfyngiadau a Gwaharddiadau Traffig Dros Dro) 2011 (WSI 2011 No. 93)
- The A55 Trunk Road (Britannia Bridge, Gwynedd and Isle of Anglesey) (Temporary Traffic Restrictions & Prohibitions) Order 2011 (WSI 2011 No. 93)
- Rheoliadau Traffordd yr M4 (O Fan i'r Gorllewin o Gyffordd 23A (Magwyr) i Fan i'r Dwyrain o Gyffordd 29 (Cas-bach)) (Terfynau Cyflymder Amrywiadwy) 2011 (WSI 2011 No. 94 (Cy. 19))
- The M4 Motorway (West of Junction 23A (Magor) to East of Junction 29 (Castleton)) (Variable Speed Limits) Regulations 2011 (WSI 2011 No. 94 (W. 19))
- Gorchymyn Mesur Dysgu a Sgiliau (Cymru) 2009 (Cychwyn Rhif 2) 2011 (WSI 2011 No. 97 (C. 6) (Cy. 20))
- The Learning and Skills (Wales) Measure 2009 (Commencement No 2) Order 2011 (WSI 2011 No. 97 (C. 6) (W. 20))
- Gorchymyn Deddf Cynllunio a Phrynu Gorfodol 2004 (Cychwyn Rhif 4 a Darpariaethau Canlyniadol a Throsiannol a Darpariaethau Arbed) (Cymru) (Diwygio) 2011 (WSI 2011 No. 101 (Cy. 21) (C. 7))
- The Planning and Compulsory Purchase Act 2004 (Commencement No 4 and Consequential, Transitional and Savings Provisions) (Wales) (Amendment) Order 2011 (WSI 2011 No. 101 (W. 21) (C. 7))
- Gorchymyn Cefnffordd yr A40 (Man i'r Gorllewin o Bont Canaston, Ger Arberth, Sir Benfro) (Cyfyngiadau Traffig Dros Dro) 2011 (WSI 2011 No. 102)
- The A40 Trunk Road (West of Canaston Bridge, Near Narberth, Pembrokeshire) (Temporary Traffic Restrictions) Order 2011 (WSI 2011 No. 102)
- Gorchymyn Cefnffordd yr A4042 (Ffordd Osgoi Llantarnam, Torfaen) (Gwahardd Cerbydau Dros Dro) 2011 (WSI 2011 No. 103)
- The A4042 Trunk Road (Llantarnam Bypass, Torfaen) (Temporary Prohibition of Vehicles) Order 2011 (WSI 2011 No. 103)
- Rheoliadau Deddf Safonau Gofal 2000 (Hysbysu) (Cymru) 2011 (WSI 2011 No. 105 (Cy. 24))
- The Care Standards Act 2000 (Notification) (Wales) Regulations 2011 (WSI 2011 No. 105 (W. 24))
- Rheoliadau Gofal Iechyd Annibynnol (Ffioedd) (Cymru) 2011 (WSI 2011 No. 106 (Cy. 25))
- The Independent Health Care (Fees) (Wales) Regulations 2011 (WSI 2011 No. 106 (W. 25))
- Rheoliadau Addysg (Cwricwlwm Lleol ar gyfer Myfyrwyr 16 i 18 Oed) (Cymru) 2011 (WSI 2011 No. 107 (Cy. 26))
- The Education (Local Curriculum for Students Aged 16 to 18) (Wales) Regulations 2011 (WSI 2011 No. 107 (W. 26))
- Gorchymyn Traffordd yr M4 (Cyffordd 32, Cyfnewidfa Coryton, Caerdydd) (Gwahardd Cerbydau Dros Dro) 2011 (WSI 2011 No. 110)
- The M4 Motorway (Junction 32, Coryton Interchange, Cardiff) (Temporary Prohibition of Vehicles) Order 2011 (WSI 2011 No. 110)
- Gorchymyn Cefnffyrdd yr A4060 a'r A465 (Dowlais Top, Merthyr Tudful) (Cyfyngiadau a Gwaharddiadau Traffig Dros Dro) 2011 (WSI 2011 No. 111)
- The A4060 & A465 Trunk Roads (Dowlais Top, Merthyr Tydfil) (Temporary Traffic Restrictions & Prohibitions) Order 2011 (WSI 2011 No. 111)
- Gorchymyn Traffordd yr M4 (Cyffordd 24, Cyfnewidfa Coldra i Gyffordd 23a Magwyr, Casnewydd) (Gwaharddiadau a Chyfyngiadau Dros Dro) 2011 (WSI 2011 No. 112)
- The M4 Motorway (Junction 24, Coldra Interchange to Junction 23a Magor, Newport) (Temporary Prohibitions and Restrictions) Order 2011 (WSI 2011 No. 112)
- Gorchymyn Cefnffordd yr A5 (Pont y Pandy i Fethesda, Gwynedd) (Terfyn Cyflymder 40 mya Dros Dro) 2011 (WSI 2011 No. 120)
- The A5 Trunk Road (Halfway Bridge to Bethesda, Gwynedd) (Temporary 40 mph Speed Limit) Order 2011 (WSI 2011 No. 120)
- Gorchymyn Cefnffyrdd yr A470, yr A40 a'r A479 (Cefncoedycymer, Merthyr Tudful i Gwm-bach Llechryd, Powys) (Gwahardd Cerbydau a Cherddwyr Dros Dro) 2011 (WSI 2011 No. 131)
- The A470, A40 & A479 Trunk Roads (Cefn Coed-y-Cymer, Merthyr Tydfil to Cwmbach, Powys) (Temporary Prohibition of Vehicles and Pedestrians) Order 2011 (WSI 2011 No. 131)
- Rheoliadau Grantiau a Benthyciadau Dysgu y Cynulliad (Addysg Uwch) (Cymru) 2011 (WSI 2011 No. 148 (Cy. 32))
- The Assembly Learning Grants and Loans (Higher Education) (Wales) Regulations 2011 (WSI 2011 No. 148 (W. 32))
- Rheoliadau Addysg (Y Diwrnod Ysgol a'r Flwyddyn Ysgol) (Cymru) (Diwygio) 2011 (WSI 2011 No. 149 (Cy. 33))
- The Education (School Day and School Year) (Wales) (Amendment) Regulations 2011 (WSI 2011 No. 149 (W. 33))
- Gorchymyn Cefnffordd yr A470 (I'r De o Gylchfan Rhyd-y-car, Merthyr Tudful) (Gwahardd Cerbydau Dros Dro) 2011 (WSI 2011 No. 151)
- The A470 Trunk Road (South of Rhyd-y-car Roundabout, Merthyr Tydfil) (Temporary Prohibition of Vehicles) Order 2011 (WSI 2011 No. 151)
- Rheoliadau Trefniadaeth Ysgolion (Diwygiadau Amrywiol) (Cymru) 2011 (WSI 2011 No. 190 (Cy. 35))
- The School Organisation (Miscellaneous Amendments) (Wales) Regulations 2011 (WSI 2011 No. 190 (W. 35))
- Rheoliadau Timau Integredig Cymorth i Deuluoedd (Swyddogaethau Cymorth i Deuluoedd) (Cymru) (Diwygio) 2011 (WSI 2011 No. 191 (Cy. 36))
- The Integrated Family Support Teams (Family Support Functions) (Wales) (Amendment) Regulations 2011 (WSI 2011 No. 191 (W. 36))
- Gorchymyn Traffordd yr M4 (Cyffordd 24, y Coldra i Gyffordd 26, Malpas) (Cyfyngiadau a Gwaharddiadau Traffig Dros Dro) 2011 (WSI 2011 No. 193)
- The M4 Motorway (Junction 24, Coldra to Junction 26, Malpas) (Temporary Traffic Restrictions & Prohibitions) Order 2011 (WSI 2011 No. 193)
- Gorchymyn Cefnffyrdd yr A487 a'r A55 (Cyffordd 9 (Treborth), Bangor, Gwynedd) (Terfyn Cyflymder 30 mya Dros Dro) 2011 (WSI 2011 No. 194)
- The A487 & A55 Trunk Roads (Junction 9 (Treborth), Bangor, Gwynedd) (Temporary 30 mph Speed Limit) Order 2011 (WSI 2011 No. 194)
- Gorchymyn Cefnffordd yr A4042 (O Gylchfan Pont-y-pŵl, Torfaen i Gylchfan Mamheilad, Sir Fynwy) (Cyfyngiadau Traffig a Gwaharddiad Traffig Dros Dro) 2011 (WSI 2011 No. 195)
- The A4042 Trunk Road (Pontypool Roundabout, Torfaen to Mamhilad Roundabout, Monmouthshire) (Temporary Traffic Restrictions and Prohibition) Order 2011 (WSI 2011 No. 195)
- Rheoliadau Ardrethu Annomestig (Eiddo Heb ei Feddiannu) (Cymru) (Diwygio) 2011 (WSI 2011 No. 197 (Cy. 40))
- The Non-Domestic Rating (Unoccupied Property) (Wales) (Amendment) Regulations 2011 (WSI 2011 No. 197 (W. 40))
- Gorchymyn Cefnffordd yr A55 (Cilfan y Gerbytffordd tua'r Dwyrain, Rhuallt, Sir Ddinbych) (Gwahardd Cerbydau rhag cael Mynediad) 2011 (WSI 2011 No. 202)
- The A55 Trunk Road (Eastbound Carriageway Lay-by, Rhuallt, Denbighshire) (Prohibition of Entry to Vehicles) Order 2011 (WSI 2011 No. 202)
- Gorchymyn Mesur Gwneud Iawn am Gamweddau'r GIG (Cymru) 2008 (Cychwyn) 2011 (WSI 2011 No. 211 (C. 11) (Cy. 42))
- The NHS Redress (Wales) Measure 2008 (Commencement) Order 2011 (WSI 2011 No. 211 (C. 11) (W. 42))
- Gorchymyn Deddf Iechyd a Gofal Cymdeithasol (Iechyd Cymunedol a Safonau) (Cymru) 2003 (Cychwyn Rhif 5) 2011 (WSI 2011 No. 212 (Cy. 43) (C. 12))
- The Health and Social Care (Community Health and Standards) Act 2003 Commencement (Wales) (No. 5) Order 2011 (WSI 2011 No. 212 (W. 43) (C. 12))
- Gorchymyn Rheoli Clefydau a Phlâu Gwenyn (Cymru) (Diwygio) 2011 (WSI 2011 No. 226 (Cy. 44))
- The Bee Diseases and Pests Control (Wales) (Amendment) Order 2011 (WSI 2011 No. 226 (W. 44))
- Rheoliadau Deunyddiau ac Eitemau Plastig mewn Cysylltiad â Bwyd (Cymru) (Diwygio) 2011 (WSI 2011 No. 233 (Cy. 45))
- The Plastic Materials and Articles in Contact with Food (Wales) (Amendment) Regulations 2011 (WSI 2011 No. 233 (W. 45))
- Gorchymyn Cefnffordd yr A487 (Tŷ· Cerrig, Garndolbenmaen, Gwynedd) (Cyfyngiadau a Gwaharddiad Traffig Dros Dro) 2011 (WSI 2011 No. 242)
- The A487 Trunk Road (Ty Cerrig, Garndolbenmaen, Gwynedd) (Temporary Traffic Restrictions & Prohibition) Order 2011 (WSI 2011 No. 242)
- Gorchymyn Traffordd yr M4 (Cyffordd 45 (Ynysforgan) a Chyffordd 48 (Yr Hendy)) (Gwahardd Cerbydau Dros Dro a Chaniatáu Traffig ar y Llain Galed) 2011 (WSI 2011 No. 246)
- The M4 Motorway (Junction 45 (Ynysforgan) and Junction 48 (Hendy)) (Temporary Prohibition of Vehicles & Trafficking of Hard Shoulder) Order 2011 (WSI 2011 No. 246)
- Gorchymyn Traffordd yr M4 (Cyffordd 41, Pentyla i Gyffordd 38, Margam, Castell-nedd Port Talbot) (Gwahardd Cerbydau Dros Dro) 2011 (WSI 2011 No. 257)
- The M4 Motorway (Junction 41, Pentyla to Junction 38, Margam, Neath Port Talbot) (Temporary Prohibition of Vehicles) Order 2011 (WSI 2011 No. 257)
- Rheoliadau'r Cwricwlwm Lleol mewn Sefydliadau Addysg Uwch (Cymru) 2011 (WSI 2011 No. 270 (Cy. 49))
- The Local Curriculum in Higher Education Institutions (Wales) Regulations 2011 (WSI 2011 No. 270 (W. 49))
- Gorchymyn Deddf Addysg Uwch 2004 (Cychwyn Rhif 3) (Cymru) 2011 (WSI 2011 No. 297 (C. 13) (Cy. 50))
- The Higher Education Act 2004 (Commencement No. 3) (Wales) Order 2011 (WSI 2011 No. 297 (C. 13) (W. 50))
- Gorchymyn Cefnffordd yr A4042 (Cylchfan Edlogan Way, Cwmbrân, Torfaen) (Gwaharddiad Traffig Dros Dro) 2011 (WSI 2011 No. 333)
- The A4042 Trunk Road (Edlogan Way Roundabout, Cwmbran, Torfaen) (Temporary Traffic Prohibition) Order 2011 (WSI 2011 No. 333)
- Gorchymyn Cefnffordd yr A483 (Derwydd, Sir Gaerfyrddin) (Cyfyngiadau Traffig Dros Dro a Gwaharddiad) 2011 (WSI 2011 No. 334)
- The A483 Trunk Road (Derwydd, Carmarthenshire) (Temporary Traffic Restrictions & Prohibition) Order 2011 (WSI 2011 No. 334)
- Gorchymyn Cefnffordd yr A494 (Glanyrafon i Fraich Ddu, Gwynedd) (Cyfyngiadau a Gwaharddiad Traffig Dros Dro) 2011 (WSI 2011 No. 339)
- The A494 Trunk Road (Glan-yr-Afon to Braich Du, Gwynedd) (Temporary Traffic Restrictions and Prohibition) Order 2011 (WSI 2011 No. 339)
- Gorchymyn Traffordd yr M4 a Chefnffordd yr A4232 (Cyffordd 33 (Gorllewin Caerdydd), Caerdydd) (Gwahardd Cerbydau Dros Dro a Therfyn Cyflymder 50 MYA Dros Dro) 2011 (WSI 2011 No. 352)
- The M4 Motorway & A4232 Trunk Road (Junction 33 (Cardiff West), Cardiff) (Temporary Prohibition of Vehicles and 50 MPH Speed Limit) Order 2011 (WSI 2011 No. 352)
- Gorchymyn Cefnffordd yr A55 (Allt Rhuallt, Llanelwy, Sir Ddinbych) (Terfyn Cyflymder 40 MYA Dros Dro) 2011 (WSI 2011 No. 386)
- The A55 Trunk Road (Rhuallt Hill, St Asaph, Denbighshire) (Temporary 40 MPH Speed Limit) Order 2011 (WSI 2011 No. 386)
- Gorchymyn Cefnffordd yr A55 (Twnelau Penmaen-bach, Conwy) (Cyfyngiadau a Gwaharddiadau Traffig Dros Dro) 2011 (WSI 2011 No. 388)
- The A55 Trunk Road (Penmaenbach Tunnels, Conwy) (Temporary Traffic Restrictions & Prohibitions) Order 2011 (WSI 2011 No. 388)
- Rheoliadau Dŵr Mwynol Naturiol, Dŵr Ffynnon a Dŵr Yfed wedi'i Botelu (Cymru) (Diwygio) 2011 (WSI 2011 No. 400 (Cy. 57))
- The Natural Mineral Water, Spring Water and Bottled Drinking Water (Wales) (Amendment) Regulations 2011 (WSI 2011 No. 400 (W. 57))
- Rheoliadau'r Cynllun Cychwyn Iach (Disgrifio Bwyd Cychwyn Iach) (Cymru) (Diwygio) 2011 (WSI 2011 No. 415 (Cy. 58))
- The Healthy Start Scheme (Description of Healthy Start Food) (Wales) (Amendment) Regulations 2011 (WSI 2011 No. 415 (W. 58))
- Gorchymyn Cefnffordd yr A55 (Cyffordd 22, Hen Golwyn i Gyffordd 25, Bodelwyddan, Conwy) (Gwaharddiadau a Chyfyngiadau Traffig Dros Dro) 2011 (WSI 2011 No. 416)
- The A55 Trunk Road (Junction 22, Old Colwyn to Junction 25, Bodelwyddan, Conwy) (Temporary Traffic Prohibitions and Restrictions) Order 2011 (WSI 2011 No. 416)
- Gorchymyn Cefnffordd yr A483 (Cyfnewidfa Rhiwabon (Cyffordd 1), Wrecsam) (Gwahardd Cerbydau Dros Dro) 2011 (WSI 2011 No. 418)
- The A483 Trunk Road (Ruabon Interchange (Junction 1), Wrexham) (Temporary Prohibition of Vehicles) Order 2011 (WSI 2011 No. 418)
- Gorchymyn Cefnffordd yr A465 (Llandarcy i Gwm-gwrach, Castellnedd Port Talbot) (Cyfyngiadau a Gwaharddiadau Traffig Dros Dro) 2011 (WSI 2011 No. 430)
- The A465 Trunk Road (Llandarcy to Cwmgwrach, Neath Port Talbot) (Temporary Traffic Restrictions and Prohibitions) Order 2011 (WSI 2011 No. 430)
- Gorchymyn Dynodi Gorfodi Sifil ar Dramgwyddau Parcio (Sir Powys) 2011 (WSI 2011 No. 433 (Cy. 62))
- The Civil Enforcement of Parking Contraventions (County of Powys) Designation Order 2011 (WSI 2011 No. 433 (W. 62))
- Gorchymyn Cynllunio Gwlad a Thref (Darpariaethau Malltod) (Cymru) 2011 (WSI 2011 No. 435 (Cy. 63))
- The Town and Country Planning (Blight Provisions) (Wales) Order 2011 (WSI 2011 No. 435 (W. 63))
- Gorchymyn Cefnffordd yr A487 (Gwelliant Glandyfi, Ceredigion) (Gwaharddiad a Chyfyngiadau Traffig Dros Dro) 2011 (WSI 2011 No. 442)
- The A487 Trunk Road (Glandyfi Improvement, Ceredigion) (Temporary Traffic Prohibition and Restrictions) Order 2011 (WSI 2011 No. 442)
- Gorchymyn Cefnffordd yr A55 (Y Gerbytffordd tua'r Gorllewin wrth Gyffordd 32b, Helygain, Sir y Fflint) (Cyfyngiad a Gwaharddiadau Traffig Dros Dro) 2011 (WSI 2011 No. 443)
- The A55 Trunk Road (Westbound Carriageway at Junction 32b, Halkyn, Flintshire) (Temporary Traffic Restriction & Prohibitions) Order 2011 (WSI 2011 No. 443)
- Gorchymyn Cefnffordd yr A55 (Y Gerbytffordd tua'r Gorllewin wrth Gyffordd 19 (Cyfnewidfa Glanconwy), Conwy) (Terfyn Cyflymder 40 mya Dros Dro) 2011 (WSI 2011 No. 444)
- The A55 Trunk Road (Westbound Carriageway at Junction 19 (Glan Conwy Interchange), Conwy) (Temporary 40 mph Speed Limit) Order 2011 (WSI 2011 No. 444)
- Rheoliadau Awdurdodau Lleol (Addasu Cyfrifiadau Angenrheidiol) (Cymru) 2011 (WSI 2011 No. 446 (Cy. 67))
- The Local Authorities (Alteration of Requisite Calculations) (Wales) Regulations 2011 (WSI 2011 No. 446 (W. 67))
- Gorchymyn Traffordd yr M4 (Slipffyrdd rhwng Cyffordd 24 (Coldra) a Chyffordd 28 (Parc Tredegar)) (Gwahardd Cerbydau Dros Dro) 2011 (WSI 2011 No. 460)
- The M4 Motorway (Slip Roads Between Junction 24 (Coldra) and Junction 28 (Tredegar Park)) (Temporary Prohibition of Vehicles) Order 2011 (WSI 2011 No. 460)
- Gorchymyn Cefnffordd yr A48 (Cas-gwent, Sir Fynwy) (Terfyn Cyflymder 50 mya) 2011 (WSI 2011 No. 461)
- The A48 Trunk Road (Chepstow, Monmouthshire) (50 mph Speed Limit) Order 2011 (WSI 2011 No. 461)
- Rheoliadau Labelu Bwyd (Datgan Alergenau) (Cymru) 2011 (WSI 2011 No. 465 (Cy. 70))
- The Food Labelling (Declaration of Allergens) (Wales) Regulations 2011 (WSI 2011 No. 465 (W. 70))
- Gorchymyn Mesur Gwastraff (Cymru) 2010 (Cychwyn) 2011 (WSI 2011 No. 476 (C. 18) (Cy. 71))
- The Waste (Wales) Measure 2010 (Commencement) Order 2011 (WSI 2011 No. 476 (C. 18) (W. 71))
- Gorchymyn Cefnffordd yr A40 (Cilfan gyferbyn â Fferm Cotts, Robeston Wathen, Sir Benfro) (Gwahardd Troi i'r Dde a Gwahardd Cerbydau rhag Cael Mynediad) 2011 (WSI 2011 No. 523)
- The A40 Trunk Road (Lay-by opposite Cotts Farm, Robeston Wathen, Pembrokeshire) (Prohibition of Right Hand Turns and Prohibition of Entry to Vehicles) Order 2011 (WSI 2011 No. 523)
- Rheoliadau'r Dreth Gyngor ac Ardrethu Annomestig (Diwygio) (Cymru) 2011 (WSI 2011 No. 528 (Cy. 73))
- The Council Tax and Non-Domestic Rating (Amendment) (Wales) Regulations 2011 (WSI 2011 No. 528 (W. 73))
- Gorchymyn Cefnffordd yr A470 (Y Gerbytffordd tua'r De rhwng Cylchfan Abercynon a Chyfnewidfa Broadway, Rhondda Cynon Taf) (Gwahardd Cerbydau Dros Dro) 2011 (WSI 2011 No. 529)
- The A470 Trunk Road (Southbound Carriageway between Abercynon Roundabout and Broadway Interchange, Rhondda Cynon Taf) (Temporary Prohibition of Vehicles) Order 2011 (WSI 2011 No. 529)
- Gorchymyn Cefnffordd yr A40 (Man i'r Gorllewin o Gaerfyrddin, Sir Gaerfyrddin) (Cyfyngiadau Traffig a Gwaharddiad Dros Dro) 2011 (WSI 2011 No. 531)
- The A40 Trunk Road (West of Carmarthen, Carmarthenshire) (Temporary Traffic Restrictions & Prohibition) Order 2011 (WSI 2011 No. 531)
- Gorchymyn Cefnffordd yr A494/A550 (Cyfnewidfa Queensferry i Gyfnewidfa Parc Diwydiannol Glannau Dyfrdwy, Sir y Fflint) (Cyfyngiad Traffig a Gwaharddiadau Traffig Dros Dro) 2011 (WSI 2011 No. 537)
- The A494/A550 Trunk Road (Queensferry Interchange to Deeside Industrial Park Interchange, Flintshire) (Temporary Traffic Restriction & Prohibitions) Order 2011 (WSI 2011 No. 537)
- Gorchymyn Targedau Ailgylchu, Paratoi i Ailddefnyddio a Chompostio (Diffiniadau) (Cymru) 2011 (WSI 2011 No. 551 (Cy. 77))
- The Recycling, Preparation for Re-use and Composting Targets (Definitions) (Wales) Order 2011 (WSI 2011 No. 551 (W. 77))
- Rheoliadau Trwyddedu Morol (Ffioedd am Geisiadau) (Cymru) 2011 (WSI 2011 No. 555 (Cy. 78))
- The Marine Licensing (Application Fees) (Wales) Regulations 2011 (WSI 2011 No. 555 (W. 78))
- Rheoliadau Trwyddedu Morol (Cofrestr o Wybodaeth Trwyddedu) (Cymru) 2011 (WSI 2011 No. 557 (Cy. 79))
- The Marine Licensing (Register of Licensing Information) (Wales) Regulations 2011 (WSI 2011 No. 557 (W. 79))
- Gorchymyn Awdurdodau Tân ac Achub (Dangosyddion Perfformiad) (Cymru) 2011 (WSI 2011 No. 558 (Cy. 80))
- The Fire and Rescue Authorities (Performance Indicators) (Wales) Order 2011 (WSI 2011 No. 558 (W. 80))
- Gorchymyn Trwyddedu Morol (Gweithgareddau Esempt) (Cymru) 2011 (WSI 2011 No. 559 (Cy. 81))
- The Marine Licensing (Exempted Activities) (Wales) Order 2011 (WSI 2011 No. 559 (W. 81))
- Gorchymyn Mesur Plant a Theuluoedd (Cymru) 2010 (Cychwyn Rhif 2, Arbedion a Darpariaethau Trosiannol) (Diwygio) a (Diwygiadau Canlyniadol) 2011 (WSI 2011 No. 577 (C. 20) (Cy. 82))
- The Children and Families (Wales) Measure 2010 (Commencement No.2, Savings and Transitional Provisions) (Amendment) and (Consequential Amendments) Order 2011 (WSI 2011 No. 577 (C. 20) (W. 82))
- Gorchymyn Cefnffordd yr A470 (Ffyrdd Ymuno ac Ymadael wrth Gyfnewidfeydd Ffynnon Taf a Glan-bad, Rhondda Cynon Taf) (Gwahardd Cerbydau Dros Dro) 2011 (WSI 2011 No. 578)
- The A470 Trunk Road (Slip Roads at Taffs Well and Upper Boat Interchanges, Rhondda Cynon Taf) (Temporary Prohibition of Vehicles) Order 2011 (WSI 2011 No. 578)
- Gorchymyn Cefnffordd yr A55 (Cyffordd 35, Dobs Hill, Sir y Fflint, Y Gerbytffordd tua'r Gorllewin a'r Ffordd Ymadael tua'r Gorllewin) (Gwaharddiadau Dros Dro a Therfyn Cyflymder 40 MYA) 2011 (WSI 2011 No. 579)
- The A55 Trunk Road (Junction 35, Dobs Hill, Flintshire, Westbound Carriageway and Westbound Off Slip Road) (Temporary Prohibitions and 40 MPH Speed Limit) Order 2011 (WSI 2011 No. 579)
- Gorchymyn Cefnffordd yr A55 (Cyffordd 35, Dobs Hill, Sir y Fflint, Y Gerbytffordd tua'r Dwyrain a'r Ffordd Ymadael tua'r Dwyrain) (Gwaharddiadau Dros Dro a Therfyn Cyflymder 40 MYA) 2011 (WSI 2011 No. 585)
- The A55 Trunk Road (Junction 35, Dobs Hill, Flintshire, Eastbound Carriageway and Eastbound Off Slip Road) (Temporary Prohibitions and 40 MPH Speed Limit) Order 2011 (WSI 2011 No. 585)
- Gorchymyn Cefnffordd yr A494 (Cyffordd Llanelidan i Glawdd Poncen, Sir Ddinbych) (Cyfyngiadau Traffig Dros Dro a Gwaharddiad) 2011 (WSI 2011 No. 590)
- The A494 Trunk Road (Llanelidan Junction to Clawdd Poncen, Denbighshire) (Temporary Traffic Restrictions and Prohibition) Order 2011 (WSI 2011 No. 590)
- Gorchymyn Ffurfiau Cymraeg Llwon a Chadarnhadau (Deddf Llywodraeth Cymru 2006) (Diwygio) 2011 (WSI 2011 No. 594 (Cy. 87))
- The Welsh Forms of Oaths and Affirmations (Government of Wales Act 2006) (Amendment) Order 2011 (WSI 2011 No. 594 (W. 87))
- The Animal By-Products (Enforcement) (Wales) Regulations 2011 (WSI 2011 No. 600 (W. 88))
- Gorchymyn Cefnffordd yr A55 (Twnnel Pen-y-clip, Bwrdeistref Sirol Conwy) (Cyfyngiad a Gwaharddiadau Dros Dro) 2011 (WSI 2011 No. 617)
- The A55 Trunk Road (Pen-y-clip Tunnel, Conwy County Borough) (Temporary Traffic Restriction & Prohibitions) Order 2011 (WSI 2011 No. 617)
- Rheoliadau Rheolaethau Swyddogol ar Fwyd Anifeiliaid a Bwyd (Cymru) (Diwygio) 2011 (WSI 2011 No. 626 (Cy. 90))
- The Official Feed and Food Controls (Wales) (Amendment) Regulations 2011 (WSI 2011 No. 626 (W. 90))
- Rheoliadau Bwyd (Jeli Cwpanau Bach) (Rheolaeth Frys) (Cymru) (Dirymu) 2011 (WSI 2011 No. 629 (Cy. 91))
- The Food (Jelly Mini-Cups) (Emergency Control) (Wales) (Revocation) Regulations 2011 (WSI 2011 No. 629 (W. 91))
- Gorchymyn Cynulliad Cenedlaethol Cymru (Taliadau Swyddogion Canlyniadau) 2011 (WSI 2011 No. 632 (Cy. 92))
- The National Assembly for Wales (Returning Officers' Charges) Order 2011 (WSI 2011 No. 632 (W. 92))
- Rheoliadau Ychwanegion Bwyd (Cymru) (Diwygio) 2011 (WSI 2011 No. 655 (Cy. 93))
- The Food Additives (Wales) (Amendment) Regulations 2011 (WSI 2011 No. 655 (W. 93))
- Rheoliadau Cynlluniau Effeithlonrwydd Ynni Cartref (Cymru) 2011 (WSI 2011 No. 656 (Cy. 94))
- The Home Energy Efficiency Schemes (Wales) Regulations 2011 (WSI 2011 No. 656 (W. 94))
- Rheoliadau Corfforaeth Addysg Bellach Coleg Caerdydd a'r Fro (Llywodraethu) 2011 (WSI 2011 No. 657 (Cy. 95))
- The Cardiff and Vale College Further Education Corporation (Government) Regulations 2011 (WSI 2011 No. 657 (W. 95))
- Rheoliadau Deddf Addysg Uwch 2004 (Awdurdod Perthnasol) (Dynodi) (Cymru) 2011 (WSI 2011 No. 658 (Cy. 96))
- The Higher Education Act 2004 (Relevant Authority) (Designation) (Wales) Regulations 2011 (WSI 2011 No. 658 (W. 96))
- Gorchymyn Coleg Caerdydd a'r Fro (Corffori) 2011 (WSI 2011 No. 659 (Cy. 97))
- The Cardiff and Vale College (Incorporation) Order 2011 (WSI 2011 No. 659 (W. 97))
- Rheoliadau'r Strategaeth Tlodi Plant (Cymru) 2011 (WSI 2011 No. 675 (Cy. 98))
- The Child Poverty Strategy (Wales) Regulations 2011 (WSI 2011 No. 675 (W. 98))
- Rheoliadau Cynulliad Cenedlaethol Cymru (Cyfrifon Swyddogion Canlyniadau) 2011 (WSI 2011 No. 676 (Cy. 99))
- The National Assembly for Wales (Returning Officers' Accounts) Regulations 2011 (WSI 2011 No. 676 (W. 99))
- Rheoliadau'r Gwasanaeth Iechyd Gwladol (Treuliau Teithio a Pheidio â Chodi Tâl) (Cymru) (Diwygio) 2011 (WSI 2011 No. 681 (Cy. 100))
- The National Health Service (Travelling Expenses and Remission of Charges) (Wales) (Amendment) Regulations 2011 (WSI 2011 No. 681 (W. 100))

== 101-200 ==
- Gorchymyn Sir Benfro (Cymunedau) 2011 (WSI 2011 No. 683 (Cy. 101))
- The Pembrokeshire (Communities) Order 2011 (WSI 2011 No. 683 (W. 101))
- Gorchymyn Cefnffyrdd yr A5 a'r A55 (Cyffordd 11 (Cylchfan Llys y Gwynt) i Gylchfan yr A4244, Gwynedd) (Cyfyngiadau Traffig dros Dro a Gwaharddiad) 2011 (WSI 2011 No. 687)
- The A5 and A55 Trunk Roads (Junction 11 (Llys y Gwynt Roundabout) to A4244 Roundabout, Gwynedd) (Temporary Traffic Restrictions & Prohibition) Order 2011 (WSI 2011 No. 687)
- Rheoliadau Ffioedd Myfyrwyr (Cyrsiau a Phersonau Cymhwysol) (Cymru) 2011 (WSI 2011 No. 691 (Cy. 103))
- The Student Fees (Qualifying Courses and Persons) (Wales) Regulations 2011 (WSI 2011 No. 691 (W. 103))
- Gorchymyn Twbercwlosis (Cymru) 2011 (WSI 2011 No. 692 (Cy. 104))
- The Tuberculosis (Wales) Order 2011 (WSI 2011 No. 692 (W. 104))
- Gorchymyn Moch Daear (Ardal Reoli) (Cymru) 2011 (WSI 2011 No. 693 (Cy. 105))
- The Badger (Control Area) (Wales) Order 2011 (WSI 2011 No. 693 (W. 105))
- Rheoliadau Ymweliadau â Phlant dan Gadwad a fu'n Derbyn Gofal (Cymru) 2011 (WSI 2011 No. 699 (Cy. 106))
- The Visits to Former Looked After Children in Detention (Wales) Regulations 2011 (WSI 2011 No. 699 (W. 106))
- Rheoliadau Suddoedd Ffrwythau a Neithdarau Ffrwythau (Cymru) (Diwygio) 2011 (WSI 2011 No. 700 (Cy. 107))
- The Fruit Juices and Fruit Nectars (Wales) (Amendment) Regulations 2011 (WSI 2011 No. 700 (W. 107))
- Rheoliadau'r Gwasanaeth Iechyd Gwladol (Trefniadau Pryderon, Cwynion ac Iawn) (Cymru) 2011 (WSI 2011 No. 704 (Cy. 108))
- The National Health Service (Concerns, Complaints and Redress Arrangements) (Wales) Regulations 2011 (WSI 2011 No. 704 (W. 108))
- Rheoliadau Addysg (Peidio â Chodi Tâl sy'n Ymwneud â Theithiau Preswyl) (Cymru) (Diwygio) 2011 (WSI 2011 No. 706 (Cy. 109))
- The Education (Remission of Charges Relating to Residential Trips) (Wales) (Amendment) Regulations 2011 (WSI 2011 No. 706 (W. 109))
- Rheoliadau Cymorth Gwladol (Asesu Adnoddau a Symiau at Anghenion Personol) (Diwygio) (Cymru) 2011 (WSI 2011 No. 708 (Cy. 110))
- The National Assistance (Assessment of Resources and Sums for Personal Requirements) (Amendment) (Wales) Regulations 2011 (WSI 2011 No. 708 (W. 110))
- Gorchymyn Addysg (Ciniawau Ysgol am Ddim) (Credydau Treth Rhagnodedig) (Cymru) (Diwygio) 2011 (WSI 2011 No. 710 (Cy. 111))
- The Education (Free School Lunches) (Prescribed Tax Credits) (Wales) (Amendment) Order 2011 (WSI 2011 No. 710 (W. 111))
- Rheoliadau Gofal Iechyd Annibynnol (Cymru) 2011 (WSI 2011 No. 734 (Cy. 112))
- The Independent Health Care (Wales) Regulations 2011 (WSI 2011 No. 734 (W. 112))
- Rheoliadau Grantiau Dysgu'r Cynulliad (Sefydliadau Ewropeaidd) (Cymru) 2011 (WSI 2011 No. 736 (Cy. 113))
- The Assembly Learning Grants (European Institutions) (Wales) Regulations 2011 (WSI 2011 No. 736 (W. 113))
- Gorchymyn Cefnffordd yr A470 (Croesfan Reilffordd Moat Lane, ger Caersŵs, Powys) (Gwahardd Cerbydau Dros Dro) 2011 (WSI 2011 No. 737)
- The A470 Trunk Road (Moat Lane Level Crossing, Nr. Caersws, Powys) (Temporary Prohibition of Vehicles) Order 2011 (WSI 2011 No. 737)
- Gorchymyn Cynulliad Cenedlaethol Cymru (Breinlythyrau) 2011 (WSI 2011 No. 752)
- The National Assembly for Wales (Letters Patent) Order 2011 (WSI 2011 No. 752)
- Gorchymyn Cefnffordd yr A40 (Treletert, Sir Benfro) (Cyfyngiadau Traffig a Gwaharddiad Traffig Dros Dro) 2011 (WSI 2011 No. 753)
- The A40 Trunk Road (Letterston, Pembrokeshire) (Temporary Traffic Restrictions and Prohibition) Order 2011 (WSI 2011 No. 753)
- Gorchymyn Cefnffordd yr A477 (Ger Rhos-goch, Sir Gaerfyrddin a Sir Benfro) (Cyfyngiadau a Gwaharddiad Traffig Dros Dro) 2011 (WSI 2011 No. 754)
- The A477 Trunk Road (Near Red Roses, Carmarthenshire and Pembrokeshire) (Temporary Traffic Restrictions and Prohibition) Order 2011 (WSI 2011 No. 754)
- Gorchymyn Cefnffordd yr A477 (Man i'r Gorllewin o Broadmoor, Sir Benfro) (Cyfyngiadau Traffig a Gwaharddiad Dros Dro) 2011 (WSI 2011 No. 755)
- The A477 Trunk Road (West of Broadmoor, Pembrokeshire) (Temporary Traffic Restrictions and Prohibition) Order 2011 (WSI 2011 No. 755)
- Gorchymyn Cefnffordd yr A483 (Heol y Bont, Llandeilo, Sir Gaerfyrddin) (Cyfyngiadau ar Aros Dros Dro) 2011 (WSI 2011 No. 756)
- The A483 Trunk Road (Bridge Street, Llandeilo, Carmarthenshire) (Temporary Waiting Restrictions) Order 2011 (WSI 2011 No. 756)
- Gorchymyn Cefnffordd yr A487 (Aberteifi, Ceredigion) (Terfyn Cyflymder 40 mya Dros Dro) 2011 (WSI 2011 No. 779)
- The A487 Trunk Road (Cardigan, Ceredigion) (Temporary 40 mph Speed Limit) Order 2011 (WSI 2011 No. 779)
- Gorchymyn Cefnffordd yr A55 (Y Ffordd Ymuno tua'r Dwyrain wrth Gyffordd 33, Cyfnewidfa Llaneurgain, Sir y Fflint) (Gwahardd Cerbydau, Beicwyr a Cherddwyr Dros Dro) 2011 (WSI 2011 No. 806)
- The A55 Trunk Road (Eastbound On Slip Road at Junction 33, Northop Interchange, Flintshire) (Temporary Prohibition of Vehicles, Cyclists & Pedestrians) Order 2011 (WSI 2011 No. 806)
- Gorchymyn Cefnffordd yr A55 (Y Gerbytffordd tua'r Dwyrain wrth Gyffordd 24 (Cyfnewidfa'r Faenol), Abergele, Conwy) (Cyfyngiad a Gwaharddiadau Traffig Dros Dro) 2011 (WSI 2011 No. 807)
- The A55 Trunk Road (Eastbound Carriageway at Junction 24 (Faenol Interchange), Abergele, Conwy) (Temporary Traffic Restriction & Prohibitions) Order 2011 (WSI 2011 No. 807)
- Rheoliadau Deddf Plant 1989 (Bwrsari Addysg Uwch) (Cymru) 2011 (WSI 2011 No. 823 (Cy. 122))
- The Children Act 1989 (Higher Education Bursary) (Wales) Regulations 2011 (WSI 2011 No. 823 (W. 122))
- Gorchymyn Deddf Plant a Phobl Ifanc 2008 (Cychwyn Rhif 5) (Cymru) 2011 (WSI 2011 No. 824 (C. 32) (Cy. 123))
- The Children and Young Persons Act 2008 (Commencement No. 5) (Wales) Order 2011 (WSI 2011 No. 824 (C. 32) (W. 123))
- Gorchymyn Deddf Prentisiaethau, Sgiliau, Plant a Dysgu 2009 (Cychwyn Rhif 3) (Cymru) 2011 (WSI 2011 No. 829 (Cy. 124) (C. 33))
- The Apprenticeships, Skills, Children and Learning Act 2009 (Commencement No. 3) (Wales) Order 2011 (WSI 2011 No. 829 (W. 124) (C. 33))
- Rheoliadau Gofal Cymunedol, Gwasanaethau ar gyfer Gofalwyr a Gwasanaethau Plant (Taliadau Uniongyrchol) (Cymru) 2011 (WSI 2011 No. 831 (Cy. 125))
- The Community Care, Services for Carers and Children's Services (Direct Payments) (Wales) Regulations 2011 (WSI 2011 No. 831 (W. 125))
- Gorchymyn Mesur Codi Ffioedd am Wasanaethau Gofal Cymdeithasol (Cymru) 2010 (Cychwyn) 2011 (WSI 2011 No. 849 (C. 34) (Cy. 126))
- The Social Care Charges (Wales) Measure 2010 (Commencement) Order 2011 (WSI 2011 No. 849 (C. 34) (W. 126))
- Rheoliadau Apelio ynghylch Gwybodaeth am Reoli Perygl Llifogydd ac Erydu Arfordirol (Cymru) 2011 (WSI 2011 No. 865 (Cy. 127))
- The Flood and Coastal Erosion Risk Management Information Appeal (Wales) Regulations 2011 (WSI 2011 No. 865 (W. 127))
- Rheoliadau Ffioedd Myfyrwyr (Cynlluniau wedi eu Cymeradwyo) (Cymru) 2011 (WSI 2011 No. 884 (Cy. 128))
- The Student Fees (Approved Plans) (Wales) Regulations 2011 (WSI 2011 No. 884 (W. 128))
- Rheoliadau Ffioedd Myfyrwyr (Symiau) (Cymru) 2011 (WSI 2011 No. 885 (Cy. 129))
- The Student Fees (Amounts) (Wales) Regulations 2011 (WSI 2011 No. 885 (W. 129))
- Rheoliadau Grantiau a Benthyciadau Dysgu'r Cynulliad (Addysg Uwch) (Cymru) (Rhif 2) 2011 (WSI 2011 No. 886 (Cy. 130))
- The Assembly Learning Grants and Loans (Higher Education) (Wales) (No. 2) Regulations 2011 (WSI 2011 No. 886 (W. 130))
- Gorchymyn Cefnffordd yr A55 (Cyffordd 11 (Cyfnewidfa Llys y Gwynt), Bangor, Gwynedd i Ffin Cymru/Lloegr) a Chefnffordd yr A494/A550 (Cyfnewidfa Ewloe, Sir y Fflint) (Cyfyngiad a Gwaharddiad Traffig Dros Dro) 2011 (WSI 2011 No. 893)
- The A55 Trunk Road (Junction 11 (Llys y Gwynt Interchange), Bangor, Gwynedd to the Wales/England Border) and The A494/A550 Trunk Road (Ewloe Interchange, Flintshire) (Temporary Traffic Restriction & Prohibition) Order 2011 (WSI 2011 No. 893)
- Rheoliadau Trwyddedu Morol (Apelau Hysbysiadau ) (Cymru) 2011 (WSI 2011 No. 923 (Cy. 132))
- The Marine Licensing (Notices Appeals) (Wales) Regulations 2011 (WSI 2011 No. 923 (W. 132))
- Gorchymyn Trwyddedu Morol (Sancsiynau Sifil) (Cymru) 2011 (WSI 2011 No. 924 (Cy. 133))
- The Marine Licensing (Civil Sanctions) (Wales) Order 2011 (WSI 2011 No. 924 (W. 133))
- Rheoliadau Trwyddedu Morol (Apelau yn Erbyn Penderfyniadau Trwyddedu ) (Cymru) 2011 (WSI 2011 No. 925 (Cy. 134))
- The Marine Licensing (Appeals Against Licensing Decisions) (Wales) Regulations 2011 (WSI 2011 No. 925 (W. 134))
- Gorchymyn Deddf Plant a Phobl Ifanc 2008 (Cychwyn Rhif 6) (Cymru) 2011 (WSI 2011 No. 949 (Cy. 135) (C. 37))
- The Children and Young Persons Act 2008 (Commencement No. 6) (Wales) Order 2011 (WSI 2011 No. 949 (W. 135) (C. 37))
- Rheoliadau Ffioedd Gofal Cymdeithasol (Asesu Modd a Phenderfynu Ffioedd) (Cymru) 2011 (WSI 2011 No. 962 (Cy. 136))
- The Social Care Charges (Means Assessment and Determination of Charges) (Wales) Regulations 2011 (WSI 2011 No. 962 (W. 136))
- Rheoliadau Ffioedd Gofal Cymdeithasol (Taliadau Uniongyrchol) (Asesu Modd a Phenderfynu ar Ad-daliad neu Gyfraniad) (Cymru) 2011 (WSI 2011 No. 963 (Cy. 137))
- The Social Care Charges (Direct Payments) (Means Assessment and Determination of Reimbursement or Contribution) (Wales) Regulations 2011 (WSI 2011 No. 963 (W. 137))
- Rheoliadau Codi Ffioedd am Wasanaethau Gofal Cymdeithasol (Adolygu Penderfyniadau ar Godi Ffioedd) (Cymru) 2011 (WSI 2011 No. 964 (Cy. 138))
- The Social Care Charges (Review of Charging Decisions) (Wales) Regulations 2011 (WSI 2011 No. 964 (W. 138))
- Gorchymyn Cyngor Cyllido Addysg Uwch Cymru (Swyddogaethau Atodol) 2011 (WSI 2011 No. 965 (Cy. 139))
- The Higher Education Funding Council for Wales (Supplementary Functions) Order 2011 (WSI 2011 No. 965 (W. 139))
- Rheoliadau Ardrethu Annomestig (Casglu a Gorfodi) (Rhestri Lleol) (Diwygio) (Cymru) 2011 (WSI 2011 No. 966 (Cy. 140))
- The Non-Domestic Rating (Collection and Enforcement) (Local Lists) (Amendment) (Wales) Regulations 2011 (WSI 2011 No. 966 (W. 140))
- Rheoliadau Gwastraff (Darpariaethau Amrywiol) (Cymru) 2011 (WSI 2011 No. 971 (Cy. 141))
- The Waste (Miscellaneous Provisions) (Wales) Regulations 2011 (WSI 2011 No. 971 (W. 141))
- Rheoliadau'r Rhaglen Mesur Plant (Cymru) 2011 (WSI 2011 No. 985 (Cy. 142))
- The Child Measurement Programme (Wales) Regulations 2011 (WSI 2011 No. 985 (W. 142))
- Gorchymyn Deddf Iechyd a Gofal Cymdeithasol (Cychwyn Rhif 17) 2011 (WSI 2011 No. 986 (Cy. 143) (C. 39))
- The Health and Social Care Act 2008 (Commencement No.17) Order 2011 (WSI 2011 No. 986 (W. 143) (C. 39))
- Rheoliadau Ymddiriedolaeth Gwasanaeth Iechyd Gwladol Iechyd Cyhoeddus Cymru (Aelodaeth a Gweithdrefn) (Diwygio) 2011 (WSI 2011 No. 990 (Cy. 144))
- The Public Health Wales National Health Service Trust (Membership and Procedure) (Amendment) Regulations 2011 (WSI 2011 No. 990 (W. 144))
- Rheoliadau Labelu Cig Eidion a Chig Llo (Cymru) 2011 (WSI 2011 No. 991 (Cy. 145))
- The Beef and Veal Labelling (Wales) Regulations 2011 (WSI 2011 No. 991 (W. 145))
- Cynllun Credydau Treth (Cymeradwyo Darparwyr Gofal Plant) (Cymru) (Diwygio) 2011 (WSI 2011 No. 993 (Cy. 146))
- The Tax Credits (Approval of Child Care Providers) (Wales) (Amendment) Scheme 2011 (WSI 2011 No. 993 (W. 146))
- Rheoliadau Hadau Llysiau (Cymru) (Diwygio) 2011 (WSI 2011 No. 994 (Cy. 147))
- The Vegetable Seed (Wales) (Amendment) Regulations 2011 (WSI 2011 No. 994 (W. 147))
- Gorchymyn Ardrethu Annomestig (Rhyddhad Ardrethi i Fusnesau Bach) (Cymru) (Diwygio) 2011 (WSI 2011 No. 995 (Cy. 148))
- The Non-Domestic Rating (Small Business Relief) (Wales) (Amendment) Order 2011 (WSI 2011 No. 995 (W. 148))
- Rheoliadau Adrodd ar Brisiau Cynhyrchion Llaeth (Cymru) 2011 (WSI 2011 No. 1009 (Cy. 149))
- The Reporting of Prices of Milk Products (Wales) Regulations 2011 (WSI 2011 No. 1009 (W. 149))
- Gorchymyn Deddf Llywodraeth Cymru 2006 (Cychwyn Darpariaethau Deddfau'r Cynulliad, Darpariaethau Trosiannol ac Arbed ac Addasiadau) 2011 (WSI 2011 No. 1011 (Cy. 150) (C. 42))
- The Government of Wales Act 2006 (Commencement of Assembly Act Provisions, Transitional and Saving Provisions and Modifications) Order 2011 (WSI 2011 No. 1011 (W. 150) (C. 42))
- Gorchymyn Dŵr (Atal Llygredd) (Cod Ymarfer Amaethyddol Da) (Cymru) 2011 (WSI 2011 No. 1012 (Cy. 151))
- The Water (Prevention of Pollution) (Code of Good Agricultural Practice) (Wales) Order 2011 (WSI 2011 No. 1012 (W. 151))
- Rheoliadau Targedau Ailgylchu, Paratoi i Ailddefnyddio a Chompostio (Monitro a Chosbau) (Cymru) 2011 (WSI 2011 No. 1014 (Cy. 152))
- The Recycling, Preparation for Re-use and Composting Targets (Monitoring and Penalties) (Wales) Regulations 2011 (WSI 2011 No. 1014 (W. 152))
- Rheoliadau Cartrefi Gofal (Cymru) (Diwygiadau Amrywiol) 2011 (WSI 2011 No. 1016 (Cy. 153))
- The Care Homes (Wales) (Miscellaneous Amendments) Regulations 2011 (WSI 2011 No. 1016 (W. 153))
- Gorchymyn Deddf Cydraddoldeb 2010 (Pennu Awdurdodau Cymreig Perthnasol) 2011 (WSI 2011 No. 1063 (Cy. 154))
- The Equality Act 2010 (Specification of Relevant Welsh Authorities) Order 2011 (WSI 2011 No. 1063 (W. 154))
- Rheoliadau Deddf Cydraddoldeb 2010 (Dyletswyddau Statudol) (Cymru) 2011 (WSI 2011 No. 1064 (Cy. 155))
- The Equality Act 2010 (Statutory Duties) (Wales) Regulations 2011 (WSI 2011 No. 1064 (W. 155))
- Rheoliadau Deddf Gwelyau Haul (Rheoleiddio) 2010 (Cymru) 2011 (WSI 2011 No. 1130 (Cy. 156))
- The Sunbeds (Regulation) Act 2010 (Wales) Regulations 2011 (WSI 2011 No. 1130 (W. 156))
- Gorchymyn Cefnffordd yr A55 (Llanfairpwll i Engedi, Ynys M(Cyfyngiadau a Gwaharddiadau Traffig Dros Dro) 2011 (WSI 2011 No. 1177)
- The A55 Trunk Road (Llanfairpwll to Engedi, Isle of Anglesey) (Temporary Traffic Restrictions and Prohibitions) Order 2011 (WSI 2011 No. 1177)
- Gorchymyn Traffordd yr M4 (Slipffyrdd rhwng Cyffordd 38 (Margam) a Chyffordd 43 (Llandarsi)) (Gwahardd Cerbydau Dros Dro) 2011 (WSI 2011 No. 1206)
- The M4 Motorway (Slip Roads between Junction 38 (Margam) and Junction 43 (Llandarcy)) (Temporary Prohibition of Vehicles) Order 2011 (WSI 2011 No. 1206)
- Gorchymyn Cefnffordd yr A4076 (Pope Hill, Johnston, Sir Benfro) (Cyfyngiadau Traffig a Gwaharddiad Traffig Dros Dro) 2011 (WSI 2011 No. 1225)
- The A4076 Trunk Road (Pope Hill, Johnston, Pembrokeshire) (Temporary Traffic Restrictions and Prohibition) Order 2011 (WSI 2011 No. 1225)
- The A494 Trunk Road (East of Tan yr Unto Bends, Denbighshire) (Temporary Traffic Restrictions and Prohibitions) Order 2011 (WSI 2011 No. 1229)
- Gorchymyn Cefnffordd yr A40 (Twneli Gibraltar, Trefynwy, Sir Fynwy) (Cyfyngiadau Traffig Dros Dro a Gwahardd Traffig Dros Dro) 2011 (WSI 2011 No. 1308)
- The A40 Trunk Road (Gibraltar Tunnels, Monmouth, Monmouthshire) (Temporary Traffic Restrictions and Prohibition) Order 2011 (WSI 2011 No. 1308)
- Gorchymyn Cefnffordd yr A483 (Cyffordd 4, y Ffyrdd Ymuno ac Ymadael Tua'r Gogledd a'r Ffordd Ymadael Tua'r De, Wrecsam) (Gwahardd Cerbydau Dros Dro) 2011 (WSI 2011 No. 1310)
- The A483 Trunk Road (Junction 4, Northbound On and Off Slips and Southbound Off Slip, Wrexham) (Temporary Prohibition of Vehicles) Order 2011 (WSI 2011 No. 1310)
- Gorchymyn Cefnffordd yr A470 (Dolwyddelan, Bwrdeistref Sirol Conwy) (Cyfyngiadau a Gwaharddiad Traffig Dros Dro) 2011 (WSI 2011 No. 1346)
- The A470 Trunk Road (Dolwyddelan, Conwy County Borough) (Temporary Traffic Restrictions & Prohibition) Order 2011 (WSI 2011 No. 1346)
- Gorchymyn Cefnffordd yr A470 (Red House Bends, Cwm-bach, Powys) (Gwahardd Dros Dro Gerbydau, Beicwyr a Cherddwyr) 2011 (WSI 2011 No. 1348)
- The A470 Trunk Road (Red House Bends, Cwmbach, Powys) (Temporary Prohibition of Vehicles, Cyclists and Pedestrians) Order 2011 (WSI 2011 No. 1348)
- Gorchymyn Cefnffordd yr A487 (Tre'r-ddôl a Thre Taliesin, Ceredigion) (Terfynau Cyflymder 30 mya a 40 mya) 2011 (WSI 2011 No. 1394)
- The A487 Trunk Road (Tre'r-ddol and Tre Taliesin, Ceredigion) (30 mph and 40 mph Speed Limits) Order 2011 (WSI 2011 No. 1394)
- Gorchymyn Cefnffordd yr A487 (Ffordd Penglais, Aberystwyth, Ceredigion) (Terfyn Cyflymder 40 mya) 2011 (WSI 2011 No. 1395)
- The A487 Trunk Road (Penglais Road, Aberystwyth, Ceredigion) (40 mph Speed Limit) Order 2011 (WSI 2011 No. 1395)
- Gorchymyn Cefnffordd yr A470 (Gelligemlyn, Gwynedd) (Cyfyngiadau a Gwaharddiadau Traffig Dros Dro) 2011 (WSI 2011 No. 1397)
- The A470 Trunk Road (Gelligemlyn, Gwynedd) (Temporary Traffic Restrictions and Prohibitions) Order 2011 (WSI 2011 No. 1397)
- Gorchymyn Cefnffordd yr A5 (Maerdy, Bwrdeistref Sirol Conwy) (Cyfyngiadau a Gwaharddiad Traffig Dros Dro) 2011 (WSI 2011 No. 1401)
- The A5 Trunk Road (Maerdy Conwy County Borough) (Temporary Traffic Restrictions & Prohibition) Order 2011 (WSI 2011 No. 1401)
- Gorchymyn Tenantiaethau Sicr (Diwygio'r Trothwy Rhent) (Cymru) 2011 (WSI 2011 No. 1409 (Cy. 169))
- The Assured Tenancies (Amendment of Rental Threshold) (Wales) Order 2011 (WSI 2011 No. 1409 (W. 169))
- Gorchymyn Cefnffordd yr A494 (Man i'r De-orllewin o Frynsaithmarchog, Sir Ddinbych) (Cyfyngiadau a Gwaharddiadau Traffig Dros Dro) 2011 (WSI 2011 No. 1426)
- The A494 Trunk Road (South West of Bryn Saith Marchog, Denbighshire) (Temporary Tr Restrictions and Prohibitions) Order 2011 (WSI 2011 No. 1426)
- Gorchymyn Cefnffordd yr A470 (Maenan, i'r Gogledd o Lanrwst, Conwy) (Cyfyngiadau a Gwaharddiad Traffig Dros Dro) 2011 (WSI 2011 No. 1428)
- The A470 Trunk Road (Maenan, North of Llanrwst, Conwy) (Temporary Traffic Restrictions and Prohibition) Order 2011 (WSI 2011 No. 1428)
- Rheoliadau Ychwanegion Bwyd (Cymru) (Diwygio) (Rhif 2) 2011 (WSI 2011 No. 1450 (Cy. 172))
- The Food Additives (Wales) (Amendment) (No. 2) Regulations 2011 (WSI 2011 No. 1450 (W. 172))
- Gorchymyn Mesur Addysg (Cymru) 2009 (Cychwyn Rhif 1) 2011 (WSI 2011 No. 1468 (C. 56) (Cy. 173))
- The Education (Wales) Measure 2009 (Commencement No.1) Order 2011 (WSI 2011 No. 1468 (C. 56) (W. 173))
- Gorchymyn Cefnffordd yr A40 (Holywell Road i Lower Monk Street, y Fenni, Sir Fynwy) (Gwahardd Cerbydau a Beicwyr Dros Dro) 2011 (WSI 2011 No. 1469)
- The A40 Trunk Road (Holywell Road to Lower Monk Street, Abergavenny, Monmouthshire) (Temporary Prohibition of Vehicles & Cyclists) Order 2011 (WSI 2011 No. 1469)
- Rheoliadau Grantiau Adnewyddu Tai (Ffurflen a Manylion Rhagnodedig) (Dirymu) (Cymru) 2011 (WSI 2011 No. 1501 (Cy. 175))
- The Housing Renewal Grants (Prescribed Form and Particulars) (Revocation) (Wales) Regulations 2011 (WSI 2011 No. 1501 (W. 175))
- Gorchymyn Corfforaeth Addysg Bellach Coleg y Barri a Chorfforaeth Addysg Bellach Coleg Glan Hafren (Diddymu) 2011 (WSI 2011 No. 1504 (Cy. 176))
- The Barry College Further Education Corporation and Coleg Glan Hafren Further Education Corporation (Dissolution) Order 2011 (WSI 2011 No. 1504 (W. 176))
- Gorchymyn Cefnffordd yr A483 (Cyfnewidfa Rhiwabon (Cyffordd 1), i Gyfnewidfa Gresffordd (Cyffordd 6), Wrecsam) (Terfyn Cyflymder 50 MYA Dros Dro) 2011 (WSI 2011 No. 1513)
- The A483 Trunk Road (Ruabon Interchange (Junction 1), to Gresford Interchange (Junction 6), Wrexham) (Temporary 50 MPH Speed Limit) Order 2011 (WSI 2011 No. 1513)
- Gorchymyn Deddf Democratiaeth Leol, Datblygu Economaidd ac Adeiladu 2009 (Cychwyn Rhif 1) (Cymru) 2011 (WSI 2011 No. 1514 (C. 57) (Cy. 178))
- The Local Democracy, Economic Development and Construction Act 2009 (Commencement No. 1) (Wales) Order 2011 (WSI 2011 No. 1514 (C. 57) (W. 178))
- Gorchymyn Cefnffordd yr A483 (Gwahanol Fannau rhwng Llanfair ym-Muallt a'r Drenewydd, Powys) (Cyfyngiadau a Gwaharddiad Traffig Dros Dro) 2011 (WSI 2011 No. 1550)
- The A483 Trunk Road (Various Locations between Builth Wells and Newtown, Powys) (Temporary Traffic Restrictions & Prohibition) Order 2011 (WSI 2011 No. 1550)
- Gorchymyn Grymuso Harbwr Saundersfoot 2011 (WSI 2011 No. 1565 (Cy. 180))
- The Saundersfoot Harbour Empowerment Order 2011 (WSI 2011 No. 1565 (W. 180))
- Gorchymyn Cefnffordd yr A40 (Crucywel i Drecastell, Powys) (Gwaharddiad Traffig a Chyfyngiadau Traffig Dros Dro) 2011 (WSI 2011 No. 1570)
- The A40 Trunk Road (Crickhowell to Trecastle, Powys) (Temporary Traffic Prohibition and Restrictions) Order 2011 (WSI 2011 No. 1570)
- Gorchymyn Mesur y Gymraeg (Cymru) 2011 (Cychwyn Rhif 1) 2011 (WSI 2011 No. 1586 (C. 60) (Cy. 182))
- The Welsh Language (Wales) Measure 2011 (Commencement No.1) Order 2011 (WSI 2011 No. 1586 (C. 60) (W. 182))
- Rheoliadau Personau Anabl (Bathodynnau ar gyfer Cerbydau Modur) (Cymru) (Diwygio) 2011 (WSI 2011 No. 1588 (Cy. 183))
- The Disabled Persons (Badges for Motor Vehicles) (Wales) (Amendment) Regulations 2011 (WSI 2011 No. 1588 (W. 183))
- Rheoliadau Comisiynydd y Gymraeg (Penodi) 2011 (WSI 2011 No. 1593 (Cy. 184))
- The Welsh Language Commissioner (Appointment) Regulations 2011 (WSI 2011 No. 1593 (W. 184))
- Gorchymyn Deddf Democratiaeth Leol, Datblygu Economaidd ac Adeiladu 2009 (Cychwyn Rhif 2) (Cymru) 2011 (WSI 2011 No. 1597 (C. 61) (Cy. 185))
- The Local Democracy, Economic Development and Construction Act 2009 (Commencement No. 2) (Wales) Order 2011 (WSI 2011 No. 1597 (C. 61) (W. 185))
- Rheoliadau Llestri Cegin Plastig (Amodau ar Fewnforion o Tsieina) (Cymru) 2011 (WSI 2011 No. 1605 (Cy. 186))
- The Plastic Kitchenware (Conditions on Imports from China) (Wales) Regulations 2011 (WSI 2011 No. 1605 (W. 186))
- Gorchymyn Hawl Plentyn i Wneud Hawliad Gwahaniaethu ar sail Anabledd (Ysgolion) (Cymru) 2011 (WSI 2011 No. 1651 (Cy. 187))
- The Right of a Child to Make a Disability Discrimination Claim (Schools) (Wales) Order 2011 (WSI 2011 No. 1651 (W. 187))
- Rheoliadau Bywyd Gwyllt a Chefn Gwlad (Cofrestru, Modrwyo a Marcio Adar Caeth Penodol) (Cymru) 2011 (WSI 2011 No. 1653 (Cy. 188))
- The Wildlife and Countryside (Registration, Ringing and Marking of Certain Captive Birds) (Wales) Regulations 2011 (WSI 2011 No. 1653 (W. 188))
- Rheoliadau Dileu Atebolrwydd dros Fenthyciadau i Fyfyrwyr at Gostau Byw (Cymru) 2011 (WSI 2011 No. 1654 (Cy. 189))
- The Cancellation of Student Loans for Living Costs Liability (Wales) Regulations 2011 (WSI 2011 No. 1654 (W. 189))
- Rheoliadau Ffioedd Gofal Cymdeithasol (Diwygiadau Amrywiol) (Cymru) 2011 (WSI 2011 No. 1666 (Cy. 190))
- The Social Care Charges (Miscellaneous Amendments) (Wales) Regulations 2011 (WSI 2011 No. 1666 (W. 190))
- Rheoliadau Gofal Cymunedol, Gwasanaethau ar gyfer Gofalwyr a Gwasanaethau Plant (Taliadau Uniongyrchol) (Cymru) (Diwygio) 2011 (WSI 2011 No. 1667 (Cy. 191))
- The Community Care, Services for Carers and Children's Services (Direct Payments) (Wales) (Amendment) Regulations 2011 (WSI 2011 No. 1667 (W. 191))
- Rheoliadau'r Gwasanaeth Iechyd Gwladol (Trefniadau Pryderon, Cwynion ac Iawn) (Cymru) (Diwygio) 2011 (WSI 2011 No. 1706 (Cy. 192))
- The National Health Service (Concerns, Complaints and Redress Arrangements) (Wales) (Amendment) Regulations 2011 (WSI 2011 No. 1706 (W. 192))
- Gorchymyn Hepgor Contractau Adeiladu (Cymru) 2011 (WSI 2011 No. 1713 (Cy. 193))
- The Construction Contracts (Wales) Exclusion Order 2011 (WSI 2011 No. 1713 (W. 193))
- Rheoliadau Rheoliadau Cynllun Contractau Adeiladu (Cymru a Lloegr) 1998 (Diwygio) (Cymru) 2011 (WSI 2011 No. 1715 (Cy. 194))
- The Scheme for Construction Contracts (England and Wales) Regulations 1998 (Amendment) (Wales) Regulations 2011 (WSI 2011 No. 1715 (W. 194))
- Rheoliadau Cig Dofednod (Cymru) 2011 (WSI 2011 No. 1719 (Cy. 195))
- The Poultrymeat (Wales) Regulations 2011 (WSI 2011 No. 1719 (W. 195))
- Rheoliadau Cymwysterau a Chofrestru Prifathrawon (Cymru) (Diwygio) 2011 (WSI 2011 No. 1769 (Cy. 196))
- The Head Teachers' Qualifications and Registration (Wales) (Amendment) Regulations 2011 (WSI 2011 No. 1769 (W. 196))
- Gorchymyn Cefnffordd yr A40 (Travellers' Rest i Gylchfan Pen-sarn, Sir Gaerfyrddin) (Cyfyngiadau a Gwaharddiadau Traffig Dros Dro) 2011 (WSI 2011 No. 1823)
- The A40 Trunk Road (Travellers Rest to Pensarn Roundabout, Carmarthenshire) (Temporary Traffic Restrictions and Prohibitions) Order 2011 (WSI 2011 No. 1823)
- Rheoliadau Dosbarthu Carcasau Eidion a Moch (Cymru) 2011 (WSI 2011 No. 1826 (Cy. 198))
- The Beef and Pig Carcase Classification (Wales) Regulations 2011 (WSI 2011 No. 1826 (W. 198))
- Rheoliadau Toddyddion Echdynnu mewn Bwyd (Diwygio) (Cymru) 2011 (WSI 2011 No. 1849 (Cy. 199))
- The Extraction Solvents in Food (Amendment) (Wales) Regulations 2011 (WSI 2011 No. 1849 (W. 199))
- Gorchymyn Traffordd yr M4 (Ffordd Ymuno tua'r Gorllewin wrth Gyffordd 32 (Coryton), Caerdydd) (Gwahardd Cerbydau Dros Dro) 2011 (WSI 2011 No. 1850)
- The M4 Motorway (Westbound Entry Slip Road at Junction 32 (Coryton), Cardiff) (Temporary Prohibition of Vehicles) Order 2011 (WSI 2011 No. 1850)

== 201-300 ==
- Gorchymyn Deddf Tai ac Adfywio 2008 (Cychwyn Rhif 2) (Cymru) 2011 (WSI 2011 No. 1863 (Cy. 201) (C. 68))
- The Housing and Regeneration Act 2008 (Commencement No. 2) (Wales) Order 2011 (WSI 2011 No. 1863 (W. 201) (C. 68))
- Rheoliadau Tai (Benthyciadau Ffioedd Gwasanaeth) (Diwygio) (Cymru) 2011 (WSI 2011 No. 1864 (Cy. 202))
- The Housing (Service Charge Loans) (Amendment) (Wales) Regulations 2011 (WSI 2011 No. 1864 (W. 202))
- Rheoliadau Tai (Prynu Buddiannau Ecwitïol) (Cymru) 2011 (WSI 2011 No. 1865 (Cy. 203))
- The Housing (Purchase of Equitable Interests) (Wales) Regulations 2011 (WSI 2011 No. 1865 (W. 203))
- Gorchymyn Cefnffordd yr A55 (Y Gerbytffordd tua'r Gorllewin rhwng Cyffordd 23 a Chyffordd 20, Bwrdeistref Sirol Conwy) (Cyfyngiad a Gwaharddiadau Traffig Dros Dro) 2011 (WSI 2011 No. 1876)
- The A55 Trunk Road (Westbound Carriageway between Junction 23 and Junction 20, Conwy County Borough) (Temporary Traffic Restriction & Prohibitions) Order 2011 (WSI 2011 No. 1876)
- Gorchymyn Traffordd yr M4 (Cyffordd 47, Penlle'r-gaer, Abertawe) (Gwahardd Cerbydau Dros Dro) 2011 (WSI 2011 No. 1914)
- The M4 Motorway (Junction 47, Penllergaer, Swansea) (Temporary Prohibition of Vehicles) Order 2011 (WSI 2011 No. 1914)
- Gorchymyn y Cwricwlwm Cenedlaethol (Diwygiadau i Drefniadau Asesu Cyfnod Allweddol 2 a Chyfnod Allweddol 3) (Cymru) 2011 (WSI 2011 No. 1937 (Cy. 206))
- The National Curriculum (Amendments to the Key Stage 2 and Key Stage 3 Assessment Arrangements) (Wales) Order 2011 (WSI 2011 No. 1937 (W. 206))
- Rheoliadau Adroddiadau Blynyddol Llywodraethwyr Ysgolion (Cymru) 2011 (WSI 2011 No. 1939 (Cy. 207))
- The School Governors' Annual Reports (Wales) Regulations 2011 (WSI 2011 No. 1939 (W. 207))
- Rheoliadau'r Gwasanaeth Iechyd Gwladol (Treuliau Teithio a Pheidio â Chodi Tâl) (Cymru) (Diwygio) (Rhif 2) 2011 (WSI 2011 No. 1940 (Cy. 208))
- The National Health Service (Travelling Expenses and Remission of Charges) (Wales) (Amendment) (No.2) Regulations 2011 (WSI 2011 No. 1940 (W. 208))
- Rheoliadau Gwybodaeth am Ddisgyblion (Cymru) 2011 (WSI 2011 No. 1942 (Cy. 209))
- The Pupil Information (Wales) Regulations 2011 (WSI 2011 No. 1942 (W. 209))
- Rheoliadau Adroddiad Pennaeth i Rieni a Disgyblion sy'n Oedolion (Cymru) 2011 (WSI 2011 No. 1943 (Cy. 210))
- The Head Teacher's Report to Parents and Adult Pupils (Wales) Regulations 2011 (WSI 2011 No. 1943 (W. 210))
- Rheoliadau Gwybodaeth Ysgolion (Cymru) 2011 (WSI 2011 No. 1944 (Cy. 211))
- The School Information (Wales) Regulations 2011 (WSI 2011 No. 1944 (W. 211))
- Rheoliadau Perfformiad Ysgol a Thargedau Absenoldeb (Cymru) 2011 (WSI 2011 No. 1945 (Cy. 212))
- The School Performance and Absence Targets (Wales) Regulations 2011 (WSI 2011 No. 1945 (W. 212))
- Gorchymyn Y Cwricwlwm Cenedlaethol (Trefniadau Asesu wrth Dderbyn i'r Cyfnod Sylfaen) (Cymru) 2011 (WSI 2011 No. 1947 (Cy. 213))
- The National Curriculum (Assessment Arrangements on Entry to the Foundation Phase) (Wales) Order 2011 (WSI 2011 No. 1947 (W. 213))
- Gorchymyn Y Cwricwlwm Cenedlaethol (Trefniadau Asesu Diwedd y Cyfnod Sylfaen a Dirymu Trefniadau Asesu'r Cyfnod Allweddol Cyntaf) (Cymru) 2011 (WSI 2011 No. 1948 (Cy. 214))
- The National Curriculum (End of Foundation Phase Assessment Arrangements and Revocation of the First Key Stage Assessment Arrangements) (Wales) Order 2011 (WSI 2011 No. 1948 (W. 214))
- Gorchymyn Mesur Addysg (Cymru) 2009 (Cychwyn Rhif 2) 2011 (WSI 2011 No. 1951 (C. 70) (Cy. 215))
- The Education (Wales) Measure 2009 (Commencement No.2) Order 2011 (WSI 2011 No. 1951 (C. 70) (W. 215))
- Gorchymyn Deddf Addysg 2002 (Cychwyn Rhif 14) (Cymru) 2011 (WSI 2011 No. 1952 (Cy. 216) (C. 71))
- The Education Act 2002 (Commencement No. 14) (Wales) Order 2011 (WSI 2011 No. 1952 (W. 216) (C. 71))
- Rheoliadau Gwybodaeth am Berfformiad Ysgolion (Cymru) 2011 (WSI 2011 No. 1963 (Cy. 217))
- The School Performance Information (Wales) Regulations 2011 (WSI 2011 No. 1963 (W. 217))
- Rheoliadau Addysg (Ffioedd Myfyrwyr, Dyfarniadau a Chymorth) (Cymru) 2011 (WSI 2011 No. 1978 (Cy. 218))
- The Education (Student Fees, Awards and Support) (Wales) Regulations 2011 (WSI 2011 No. 1978 (W. 218))
- Gorchymyn Cocos a Chregyn Gleision (Ardal Benodedig) (Cymru) 2011 (WSI 2011 No. 1988 (Cy. 219))
- The Cockles and Mussels (Specified Area) (Wales) Order 2011 (WSI 2011 No. 1988 (W. 219))
- Gorchymyn Traffordd yr M4 a Chefnffordd yr A470 (Cyffordd 32, Coryton, Caerdydd) (Cyfyngiadau a Gwaharddiadau Traffig Dros Dro) 2011 (WSI 2011 No. 1989)
- The M4 Motorway and the A470 Trunk Road (Junction 32, Coryton, Cardiff) (Temporary Traffic Restrictions and Prohibitions) Order 2011 (WSI 2011 No. 1989)
- Gorchymyn Mesur Llywodraeth Leol (Cymru) 2011 (Cychwyn Rhif 1) 2011 (WSI 2011 No. 2011 (C. 74) (Cy. 221))
- The Local Government (Wales) Measure 2011 (Commencement No. 1) Order 2011 (WSI 2011 No. 2011 (C. 74) (W. 221))
- Gorchymyn Cefnffordd yr A483 (Llandybïe, Sir Gaerfyrddin) (Terfyn Cyflymder 10 mya Dros Dro a Dim Goddiweddyd) 2011 (WSI 2011 No. 2082)
- The A483 Trunk Road (Llandybie, Carmarthenshire) (Temporary 10 mph Speed Limit & No Overtaking) Order 2011 (WSI 2011 No. 2082)
- Gorchymyn Cefnffordd yr A465 (Cylchfan Cefn Coed, Merthyr Tudful i Gylchfan Hirwaun, Rhondda Cynon Taf) (Gwahardd Cerbydau a Therfyn Cyflymder 50 mya Dros Dro) 2011 (WSI 2011 No. 2083)
- The A465 Trunk Road (Cefn Coed Roundabout, Merthyr Tydfil to Hirwaun Roundabout, Rhondda Cynon Taf) (Temporary Prohibition of Vehicles & 50 mph Speed Limit) Order 2011 (WSI 2011 No. 2083)
- Gorchymyn Cefnffordd yr A55 (Slipffyrdd rhwng Cyffordd 2 (Tŷ· Mawr) a Chyffordd 6 (Tyrpeg y Nant), Ynys Môn) (Gwahardd Cerbydau Dros Dro) 2011 (WSI 2011 No. 2086)
- The A55 Trunk Road (Slip Roads between Junction 2 (Tŷ· Mawr) and Junction 6 (Nant Turnpike), Isle of Anglesey) (Temporary Prohibition of Vehicles) Order 2011 (WSI 2011 No. 2086)
- Gorchymyn Cefnffordd yr A48 (Cyffordd Cwm-ffrwd i Gyffordd Llanddarog, Sir Gaerfyrddin) (Cyfyngiadau a Gwaharddiadau Traffig Dros Dro) 2011 (WSI 2011 No. 2099)
- The A48 Trunk Road (Cwmffrwd Junction to Llanddarog Junction, Carmarthenshire) (Temporary Traffic Restrictions and Prohibitions) Order 2011 (WSI 2011 No. 2099)
- Gorchymyn Cefnffordd yr A483 (Croesfan Lefel Cilyrychen, Llandeilo Road, ger Llandybïe, Sir Gaerfyrddin) (Gwahardd Cerbydau Dros Dro) 2011 (WSI 2011 No. 2100)
- The A483 Trunk Road (Cilyrychen Level Crossing, Llandeilo Road, Near Llandybie, Carmarthenshire) (Temporary Prohibition of Vehicles) Order 2011 (WSI 2011 No. 2100)
- Gorchymyn Cefnffordd yr A40 (Man i'r Gorllewin o Landdewi Felffre, Sir Benfro) (Cyfyngiadau Traffig a Gwaharddiad Traffig Dros Dro) 2011 (WSI 2011 No. 2101)
- The A40 Trunk Road (West of Llanddewi Velfrey, Pembrokeshire) (Temporary Traffic Restrictions and Prohibition) Order 2011 (WSI 2011 No. 2101)
- Gorchymyn Cefnffordd yr A4076 (Johnston, Sir Benfro) (Terfyn Cyflymder 10 MYA Dros Dro a Gwahardd Goddiweddyd) 2011 (WSI 2011 No. 2102)
- The A4076 Trunk Road (Johnston, Pembrokeshire) (Temporary 10 MPH Speed Limit and Prohibition of Overtaking) Order 2011 (WSI 2011 No. 2102)
- Gorchymyn Cefnffordd yr A4076 (Aberdaugleddau, Sir Benfro) (Terfyn Cyflymder 10 MYA Dros Dro a Gwahardd Goddiweddyd) 2011 (WSI 2011 No. 2103)
- The A4076 Trunk Road (Milford Haven, Pembrokeshire) (Temporary 10 MPH Speed Limit and Prohibition of Overtaking) Order 2011 (WSI 2011 No. 2103)
- Gorchymyn Cefnffordd yr A40 (Croesfan Reilffordd Llanymddyfri, Llanymddyfri, Sir Gaerfyrddin) (Gwahardd Cerbydau Dros Dro) 2011 (WSI 2011 No. 2124)
- The A40 Trunk Road (Llandovery Level Crossing, Llandovery, Carmarthenshire) (Temporary Prohibition of Vehicles) Order 2011 (WSI 2011 No. 2124)
- Gorchymyn Cefnffyrdd yr A449 a'r A40 (Brynbuga i Raglan, Sir Fynwy) (Cyfyngiadau a Gwaharddiadau Traffig Dros Dro) 2011 (WSI 2011 No. 2164)
- The A449 & A40 Trunk Roads (Usk to Raglan, Monmouthshire) (Temporary Traffic Restrictions & Prohibitions) Order 2011 (WSI 2011 No. 2164)
- Gorchymyn Cefnffordd yr A40 (Penblewin, Arberth, Sir Benfro) (Cyfyngiadau a Gwaharddiad Traffig Dros Dro) 2011 (WSI 2011 No. 2165)
- The A40 Trunk Road (Penblewin, Narberth, Pembrokeshire) (Temporary Traffic Restrictions & Prohibition) Order 2011 (WSI 2011 No. 2165)
- Gorchymyn Cefnffordd yr A477 (Man i'r Gorllewin o Gylchfan Cilgeti, Sir Benfro) (Cyfyngiadau a Gwaharddiad Traffig Dros Dro) 2011 (WSI 2011 No. 2166)
- The A477 Trunk Road (West of Kilgetty Roundabout, Pembrokeshire) (Temporary Traffic Restrictions & Prohibition) Order 2011 (WSI 2011 No. 2166)
- Gorchymyn Cefnffordd yr A40 (Heol Arberth a Heol Abergwaun, Hwlffordd, Sir Benfro) (Cyfyngiad a Gwaharddiad Traffig Dros Dro) 2011 (WSI 2011 No. 2167)
- The A40 Trunk Road (Narberth Road and Fishguard Road, Haverfordwest, Pembrokeshire) (Temporary Traffic Restriction & Prohibition) Order 2011 (WSI 2011 No. 2167)
- Gorchymyn Traffordd yr M4 (Pont Afon Ebwy, Cyffordd 27, High Cross i Gyffordd 28, Parc Tredegar, Casnewydd) (Cyfyngiadau a Gwaharddiadau Traffig Dros Dro) 2011 (WSI 2011 No. 2168)
- The M4 Motorway (Ebbw River Bridge, Junction 27, High Cross to Junction 28, Tredegar Park, Newport) (Temporary Traffic Restrictions and Prohibitions) Order 2011 (WSI 2011 No. 2168)
- Rheoliadau Codi Tâl am Fagiau Siopa Untro (Cymru) (Diwygio) 2011 (WSI 2011 No. 2184 (Cy. 236))
- The Single Use Carrier Bags Charge (Wales) (Amendment) Regulations 2011 (WSI 2011 No. 2184 (W. 236))
- Gorchymyn Cefnffordd yr A470 (Pontnewydd-ar-Wy i Langurig, Powys) (Cyfyngiadau a Gwaharddiad Traffig Dros Dro) 2011 (WSI 2011 No. 2233)
- The A470 Trunk Road (Newbridge on Wye to Llangurig, Powys) (Temporary Traffic Restrictions and Prohibition) Order 2011 (WSI 2011 No. 2233)
- Gorchymyn Traffordd yr M4 (Slipffyrdd yng Nghyffordd 48, Hendy, Sir Gaerfyrddin) (Gwahardd Cerbydau Dros Dro) 2011 (WSI 2011 No. 2234)
- The M4 Motorway (Slip Roads at Junction 48, Hendy, Carmarthenshire) (Temporary Prohibition of Vehicles) Order 2011 (WSI 2011 No. 2234)
- Gorchymyn Cefnffordd yr A5 (Betws-y-coed i Westy'r Rhaeadr Ewynnol, Conwy) (Cyfyngiadau a Gwaharddiad Traffig Dros Dro) 2011 (WSI 2011 No. 2289)
- The A5 Trunk Road (Betws y Coed to Swallow Falls Hotel, Conwy) (Temporary Traffic Restrictions and Prohibition) Order 2011 (WSI 2011 No. 2289)
- Gorchymyn Cefnffordd yr A40 (Pontyfenni i Gylchfan Llanboidy, Sir Gaerfyrddin) (Cyfyngiadau a Gwaharddiad Traffig Dros Dro) 2011 (WSI 2011 No. 2293)
- The A40 Trunk Road (Pontyfenni to Llanboidy Roundabout, Carmarthenshire) (Temporary Traffic Restrictions and Prohibition) Order 2011 (WSI 2011 No. 2293)
- Gorchymyn Cefnffordd yr A465 (Ffordd Ymuno tua'r Dwyrain wrth Gyfnewidfa Glyn-nedd, Castell-nedd Port Talbot) (Gwahardd Cerbydau Dros Dro) 2011 (WSI 2011 No. 2310)
- The A465 Trunk Road (Eastbound On Slip Road at Glynneath Interchange, Neath Port Talbot) (Temporary Prohibition of Vehicles) Order 2011 (WSI 2011 No. 2310)
- Rheoliadau Addysg (Gwybodaeth am Ddisgyblion Unigol) (Cymru) (Diwygio) 2011 (WSI 2011 No. 2325 (Cy. 242))
- The Education (Information About Individual Pupils) (Wales) (Amendment) Regulations 2011 (WSI 2011 No. 2325 (W. 242))
- Gorchymyn Cefnffordd yr A487 (Cylchfan Tremadog i Gylchfan Porthmadog, Man i'r De o Dremadog, Gwynedd) (Cyfyngiadau Traffig Dros Dro) 2011 (WSI 2011 No. 2326)
- The A487 Trunk Road (Tremadog Roundabout to Porthmadog Roundabout, South of Tremadog, Gwynedd) (Temporary Traffic Restrictions) Order 2011 (WSI 2011 No. 2326)
- Gorchymyn Traffordd yr M4 (Y Gerbytffordd tua'r Gorllewin wrth Gyffordd 32 (Coryton), Caerdydd) (Gwahardd Cerbydau Dros Dro) 2011 (WSI 2011 No. 2327)
- The M4 Motorway (Westbound Carriageway at Junction 32 (Coryton), Cardiff) (Temporary Prohibition of Vehicles) Order 2011 (WSI 2011 No. 2327)
- Gorchymyn Cefnffordd yr A55 (Glanconwy - Morfa Conwy, Bwrdeistref Sirol Conwy) (Terfyn Cyflymder 70 mya Dros Dro) 2011 (WSI 2011 No. 2330)
- The A55 Trunk Road (Glan Conwy - Conwy Morfa, Conwy County Borough) (Temporary 70 mph Speed Limit) Order 2011 (WSI 2011 No. 2330)
- Gorchymyn Cefnffordd yr A494 (Rhuthun, Sir Ddinbych) (Cyfyngiadau a Gwaharddiadau Dros Dro) 2011 (WSI 2011 No. 2349)
- The A494 Trunk Road (Ruthin, Denbighshire) (Temporary Traffic Restrictions and Prohibitions) Order 2011 (WSI 2011 No. 2349)
- Gorchymyn Cefnffordd yr A465(Y Ffyrdd Ymuno ac Ymadael tua'r Dwyrain wrth Gyffordd Llan-ffwyst, Llan-ffwyst, Sir Fynwy) (Gwahardd Cerbydau Dros Dro) 2011 (WSI 2011 No. 2354)
- The A465 Trunk Road (Eastbound Slip Roads at Llanfoist Junction, Llanfoist, Monmouthshire) (Temporary Prohibition of Vehicles) Order 2011 (WSI 2011 No. 2354)
- Gorchymyn Deddf Iechyd 2009 (Cychwyn Rhif 2) (Cymru) 2011 (WSI 2011 No. 2362 (C. 83) (Cy. 248))
- The Health Act 2009 (Commencement No. 2) (Wales) Order 2011 (WSI 2011 No. 2362 (C. 83) (W. 248))
- Gorchymyn Cefnffordd yr A470 (Cyfnewidfa Ffynnon Taf, Caerdydd i Gyfnewidfa Nantgarw, Rhondda Cynon Taf) (Gwahardd Cerbydau Dros Dro) 2011 (WSI 2011 No. 2373)
- The A470 Trunk Road (Taffs Well Interchange, Cardiff to Nantgarw Interchange, Rhondda Cynon Taf) (Temporary Prohibition of Vehicles) Order 2011 (WSI 2011 No. 2373)
- Rheoliadau Sgil-gynhyrchion Anifeiliaid (Gorfodi) (Rhif 2) (Cymru) 2011 (WSI 2011 No. 2377 (Cy. 250))
- The Animal By-Products (Enforcement) (No. 2) (Wales) Regulations 2011 (WSI 2011 No. 2377 (W. 250))
- Rheoliadau'r Cynllun Iechyd Dofednod (Ffioedd) (Cymru) 2011 (WSI 2011 No. 2378 (Cy. 251))
- The Poultry Health Scheme (Fees) (Wales) Regulations 2011 (WSI 2011 No. 2378 (W. 251))
- Rheoliadau'r Fasnach mewn Anifeiliaid a Chynhyrchion Perthynol (Cymru) 2011 (WSI 2011 No. 2379 (Cy. 252))
- The Trade in Animals and Related Products (Wales) Regulations 2011 (WSI 2011 No. 2379 (W. 252))
- Gorchymyn Cefnffordd yr A44 (Gwahanol Fannau rhwng Llangurig ac Eisteddfa Gurig, Powys) (Cyfyngiadau Traffig a Gwaharddiad Traffig Dros Dro) 2011 (WSI 2011 No. 2380)
- The A44 Trunk Road (Various Locations between Llangurig and Eisteddfa Gurig, Powys) (Temporary Traffic Restrictions & Prohibition) Order 2011 (WSI 2011 No. 2380)
- Gorchymyn Traffordd yr M4 (Cyffordd 45, Ynysforgan, Abertawe) (Gwahardd Cerbydau Dros Dro) 2011 (WSI 2011 No. 2381)
- The M4 Motorway (Junction 45, Ynysforgan, Swansea) (Temporary Prohibition of Vehicles) Order 2011 (WSI 2011 No. 2381)
- Gorchymyn Cefnffordd yr A494 (Man i'r Dwyrain o Ruthun, Sir Ddinbych) (Gwaharddiadau a Chyfyngiad Traffig Dros Dro) 2011 (WSI 2011 No. 2382)
- The A494 Trunk Road (East of Ruthin, Denbighshire) (Temporary Traffic Prohibitions and Restriction) Order 2011 (WSI 2011 No. 2382)
- Gorchymyn Cefnffordd yr A483 (Cyffordd 4, Cyfnewidfa Ffordd Rhuthun i Gyffordd 5, Cyfnewidfa Ffordd yr Wyddgrug, Wrecsam) (Gwaharddiadau a Therfyn Cyflymder 40 MYA Dros Dro) 2011 (WSI 2011 No. 2383)
- The A483 Trunk Road (Junction 4, Ruthin Road Interchange to Junction 5, Mold Road Interchange, Wrexham) (Temporary Prohibitions and 40 MPH Speed Limit) Order 2011 (WSI 2011 No. 2383)
- Gorchymyn Cefnffordd yr A4042 (Pont Llanelen, Llanelen, Sir Fynwy) (Gwahardd Cerbydau Dros Dro) 2011 (WSI 2011 No. 2384)
- The A4042 Trunk Road (Llanellen Bridge, Llanellen, Monmouthshire) (Temporary Prohibition of Vehicles) Order 2011 (WSI 2011 No. 2384)
- Gorchymyn Cefnffordd yr A40 (Ffordd Ymadael Tua'r De yn Nhrefynwy, Sir Fynwy) (Gwahardd Cerbydau Dros Dro) 2011 (WSI 2011 No. 2398)
- The A40 Trunk Road (Southbound Exit Slip Road at Monmouth, Monmouthshire) (Temporary Prohibition of Vehicles) Order 2011 (WSI 2011 No. 2398)
- Gorchymyn Cefnffordd yr A465 (Cylchfan Rasa i Gylchfan Brynmawr, Blaenau Gwent) (Gwahardd Cerbydau Dros Dro) 2011 (WSI 2011 No. 2408)
- The A465 Trunk Road (Rassau Roundabout to Brynmawr Roundabout, Blaenau Gwent) (Temporary Prohibition of Vehicles) Order 2011 (WSI 2011 No. 2408)
- Gorchymyn Cefnffordd yr A48 (Cylchfan Pont Abraham i Barc Busnes Cross Hands, Sir Gaerfyrddin) (Cyfyngiadau a Gwaharddiadau Traffig Dros Dro) 2011 (WSI 2011 No. 2414)
- The A48 Trunk Road (Pont Abraham Roundabout to Cross Hands Business Park, Carmarthenshire) (Temporary Traffic Restrictions & Prohibitions) Order 2011 (WSI 2011 No. 2414)
- Rheoliadau Ymchwiliadau Lleol, Ymchwiliadau Cymwys a Gweithdrefnau Cymwys (Swm Dyddiol Safonol) (Cymru) 2011 (WSI 2011 No. 2415 (Cy. 261))
- The Local Inquiries, Qualifying Inquiries and Qualifying Procedures (Standard Daily Amount) (Wales) Regulations 2011 (WSI 2011 No. 2415 (W. 261))
- Gorchymyn Cefnffordd yr A477 (Man i'r Dwyrain o Ros-goch, Sir Gaerfyrddin) (Terfyn Cyflymder 40 MYA Dros Dro) 2011 (WSI 2011 No. 2429)
- The A477 Trunk Road (East of Red Roses, Carmarthenshire) (Temporary 40 MPH Speed Limit) Order 2011 (WSI 2011 No. 2429)
- Gorchymyn Cefnffordd yr A470 (Llanrwst, Conwy) (Cyfyngiadau a Gwaharddiadau Traffig Dros Dro) 2011 (WSI 2011 No. 2445)
- The A470 Trunk Road (Llanrwst, Conwy) (Temporary Traffic Restrictions and Prohibitions) Order 2011 (WSI 2011 No. 2445)
- Gorchymyn Cefnffordd yr A483 (Ffairfach i Landeilo, Sir Gaerfyrddin) (Cyfyngiadau a Gwaharddiadau Traffig Dros Dro) 2011 (WSI 2011 No. 2449)
- The A483 Trunk Road (Ffairfach to Llandeilo, Carmarthenshire) (Temporary Traffic Restriction and Prohibitions) Order 2011 (WSI 2011 No. 2449)
- Gorchymyn Traffordd yr M4 (Y Ffordd Ymadael Tua'r Dwyrain wrth Gyffordd 37 (Y Pîl), Bwrdeistref Sirol Pen-y-bont ar Ogwr) (Gwahardd Cerbydau Dros Dro) 2011 (WSI 2011 No. 2450)
- The M4 Motorway (Eastbound Exit Slip Road at Junction 37 (Pyle), Bridgend County Borough) (Temporary Prohibition of Vehicles) Order 2011 (WSI 2011 No. 2450)
- Gorchymyn Cefnffordd yr A477 (Cyffordd Ffordd Bace i Landdowror, Sir Gaerfyrddin) (Cyfyngiadau a Gwaharddiad Traffig Dros Dro) 2011 (WSI 2011 No. 2469)
- The A477 Trunk Road (Backe Road Junction to Llanddowror, Carmarthenshire) (Temporary Traffic Restrictions and Prohibition) Order 2011 (WSI 2011 No. 2469)
- Gorchymyn Mesur Tai (Cymru) 2011 (Cychwyn Rhif 1) 2011 (WSI 2011 No. 2475 (C. 89) (Cy. 267))
- The Housing (Wales) Measure 2011 (Commencement No. 1) Order 2011 (WSI 2011 No. 2475 (C. 89) (W. 267))
- Gorchymyn Cefnffordd yr A4232 (Cyfnewidfa Croes Cwrlwys i Drosbont Drope Road, Caerdydd) (Terfyn Cyflymder 40 MYA Dros Dro) 2011 (WSI 2011 No. 2483)
- The A4232 Trunk Road (Culverhouse Cross Interchange to Drope Road Overbridge, Cardiff) (Temporary 40 MPH Speed Limit) Order 2011 (WSI 2011 No. 2483)
- Gorchymyn Traffordd yr M4 (Cyffordd 33, Capel Llanilltern, Caerdydd, Y Ffordd Ymuno tua'r Gorllewin) (Gwahardd Cerbydau Dros Dro) 2011 (WSI 2011 No. 2484)
- The M4 Motorway (Junction 33, Capel Llanilltern, Cardiff, Westbound On-Slip Road) (Temporary Prohibition of Vehicles) Order 2011 (WSI 2011 No. 2484)
- Rheoliadau Marchnata Cynnyrch Garddwriaethol Ffres (Cymru) (Diwygio) 2011 (WSI 2011 No. 2486 (Cy. 270))
- The Marketing of Fresh Horticultural Produce (Wales) (Amendment) Regulations 2011 (WSI 2011 No. 2486 (W. 270))
- Rheoliadau Amddiffyn rhag Tybaco (Gwerthiannau o Beiriannau Gwerthu) (Cymru) 2011 (WSI 2011 No. 2498 (Cy. 271))
- The Protection from Tobacco (Sales from Vending Machines) (Wales) Regulations 2011 (WSI 2011 No. 2498 (W. 271))
- Rheoliadau Iechyd Meddwl (Asesu Defnyddwyr Blaenorol o Wasanaethau Iechyd Meddwl Eilaidd) (Cymru) 2011 (WSI 2011 No. 2500 (Cy. 272))
- The Mental Health (Assessment of Former Users of Secondary Mental Health Services) (Wales) Regulations 2011 (WSI 2011 No. 2500 (W. 272))
- Rheoliadau Iechyd Meddwl (Eiriolwyr Iechyd Meddwl Annibynnol) (Cymru) 2011 (WSI 2011 No. 2501 (Cy. 273))
- The Mental Health (Independent Mental Health Advocates) (Wales) Regulations 2011 (WSI 2011 No. 2501 (W. 273))
- Gorchymyn Cefnffordd yr A55(Twnnel Conwy, Bwrdeistref Sirol Conwy) (Cyfyngiad a Gwaharddiadau Traffig Dros Dro) (Rhif 2) 2011 (WSI 2011 No. 2502)
- The A55 Trunk Road(Conwy Tunnel, Conwy County Borough) (Temporary Traffic Restriction & Prohibitions) (No.2) Order 2011 (WSI 2011 No. 2502)
- Gorchymyn Cefnffordd yr A470 (Gwahanol Fannau rhwng Llandinam a Chemais, Powys) (Cyfyngiadau a Gwaharddiad Traffig Dros Dro) 2011 (WSI 2011 No. 2513)
- The A470 Trunk Road (Various Locations between Llandinam and Cemmaes, Powys) (Temporary Traffic Restrictions & Prohibition) Order 2011 (WSI 2011 No. 2513)
- Gorchymyn Cefnffordd yr A483 (Rhydaman, Sir Gaerfyrddin) (Amrywiol Gyfyngiadau Aros) 2011 (WSI 2011 No. 2514)
- The A483 Trunk Road (Ammanford, Carmarthenshire) (Various Waiting Restrictions) Order 2011 (WSI 2011 No. 2514)
- Gorchymyn Cefnffordd yr A487 (Abergwaun, Sir Benfro) (Gwahardd Cerbydau Dros Dro) 2011 (WSI 2011 No. 2538)
- The A487 Trunk Road (Fishguard, Pembrokeshire) (Temporary Prohibition of Vehicles) Order 2011 (WSI 2011 No. 2538)
- Gorchymyn Cefnffyrdd yr A494 a'r A550 (Cyfnewidfa Glannau Dyfrdwy, Sir y Fflint) (Gwahardd Cerbydau Dros Dro) 2011 (WSI 2011 No. 2539)
- The A494 & A550 Trunk Roads (Deeside Interchange, Flintshire) (Temporary Prohibition of Vehicles) Order 2011 (WSI 2011 No. 2539)
- Rheoliadau'r Cynllun Lwfansau Tirlenwi (Cymru) (Diwygio) 2011 (WSI 2011 No. 2555 (Cy. 279))
- The Landfill Allowances Scheme (Wales) (Amendment) Regulations 2011 (WSI 2011 No. 2555 (W. 279))
- Gorchymyn Adroddiadau Archwilio ac Asesu (Cymru) (Diwygio) 2011 (WSI 2011 No. 2602 (Cy. 280))
- The Audit and Assessment Reports (Wales) (Amendment) Order 2011 (WSI 2011 No. 2602 (W. 280))
- Gorchymyn Cefnffordd yr A483 (Ffordd Osgoi Newbridge, Newbridge, Wrecsam) (Gwahardd Cerbydau Dros Dro) 2011 (WSI 2011 No. 2603)
- The A483 Trunk Road (Newbridge Bypass, Newbridge, Wrexham) (Temporary Prohibition of Vehicles) Order 2011 (WSI 2011 No. 2603)
- Gorchymyn Cefnffordd yr A55 (Cyffordd 32, Helygain i Gyffordd 34, Ewloe, Sir y Fflint) (Gwaharddiadau a Therfyn Cyflymder 40 MYA Dros Dro) 2011 (WSI 2011 No. 2604)
- The A55 Trunk Road (Junction 32, Halkyn, to Junction 34, Ewloe, Flintshire) (Temporary Prohibitions and 40 MPH Speed Limit) Order 2011 (WSI 2011 No. 2604)
- Rheoliadau Cyfraniadau Ardrethu Annomestig (Cymru) (Diwygio) 2011 (WSI 2011 No. 2610 (Cy. 283))
- The Non-Domestic Rating Contributions (Wales) (Amendment) Regulations 2011 (WSI 2011 No. 2610 (W. 283))
- Rheoliadau Camddefnyddio Sylweddau (Llunio a Gweithredu Strategaeth) (Cymru) (Diwygio) 2011 (WSI 2011 No. 2660 (Cy. 284))
- The Substance Misuse (Formulation and Implementation of Strategy) (Wales) (Amendment) Regulations 2011 (WSI 2011 No. 2660 (W. 284))
- The A4042 Trunk Road (Grove Park Roundabout to Pillmawr Road Bridge, Newport) (Temporary Traffic Restriction) Order 2011 (WSI 2011 No. 2670)
- Gorchymyn Cefnffordd yr A4042 (Cylchfan Grove Park i Bont Heol Pillmawr, Casnewydd) (Cyfyngiad Traffig Dros Dro) 2011 (WSI 2011 No. 2670)
- Rheoliadau Cwmnïau RTM (Erthyglau Enghreifftiol) (Cymru) 2011 (WSI 2011 No. 2680 (Cy. 286))
- The RTM Companies (Model Articles) (Wales) Regulations 2011 (WSI 2011 No. 2680 (W. 286))
- Rheoliadau'r Hawl i Reoli (Manylion a Ffurflenni Rhagnodedig) (Cymru) 2011 (WSI 2011 No. 2684 (Cy. 287))
- The Right to Manage (Prescribed Particulars and Forms) (Wales) Regulations 2011 (WSI 2011 No. 2684 (W. 287))
- Rheoliadau Deintyddiaeth Breifat (Cymru) (Diwygio) 2011 (WSI 2011 No. 2686 (Cy. 288))
- The Private Dentistry (Wales) (Amendment) Regulations 2011 (WSI 2011 No. 2686 (W. 288))
- Gorchymyn Cefnffordd yr A55 (Cerbytffordd Tua'r Dwyrain rhwng Cyffordd 23 (Llanddulas) a Chyffordd 24 (Abergele), Bwrdeistref Sirol Conwy) (Cyfyngiad a Gwaharddiadau Traffig Dros Dro) 2011 (WSI 2011 No. 2697)
- The A55 Trunk Road (Eastbound Carriageway between Junction 23 (Llanddulas) and Junction 24 (Abergele), Conwy County Borough) (Temporary Traffic Restriction & Prohibitions) Order 2011 (WSI 2011 No. 2697)
- Gorchymyn Traffordd yr M4 (Cyffordd 44 (Lôn-las) i Gyffordd 47 (Penlle'r-gaer), Abertawe) (Gwahardd Cerbydau Dros Dro) 2011 (WSI 2011 No. 2706)
- The M4 Motorway (Junction 44 (Lon Las) to Junction 47 (Penllergaer), Swansea) (Temporary Prohibition of Vehicles) Order 2011 (WSI 2011 No. 2706)
- Gorchymyn Traffordd yr M4 (Y Ffordd Ymuno tua'r Dwyrain wrth Gyffordd 35 (Pencoed), Bwrdeistref Sirol Pen-y-bont ar Ogwr) (Gwahardd Cerbydau Dros Dro) 2011 (WSI 2011 No. 2707)
- The M4 Motorway (Eastbound Entry Slip Road at Junction 35 (Pencoed), Bridgend County Borough) (Temporary Prohibition of Vehicles) Order 2011 (WSI 2011 No. 2707)
- Gorchymyn Cefnffordd yr A483 (Y Ffordd Ymuno tua'r Gogledd wrth Gyffordd 3, Ffordd Osgoi Wrecsam, Wrecsam) (Gwahardd Cerbydau Dros Dro) 2011 (WSI 2011 No. 2708)
- The A483 Trunk Road (Northbound On Slip Road at Junction 3, Wrexham Bypass, Wrexham) (Temporary Prohibition of Vehicles) Order 2011 (WSI 2011 No. 2708)
- Gorchymyn Cefnffordd yr A483 (Ffordd Osgoi Wrecsam (Cyffordd 2 - Cyffordd 6), Wrecsam) (Terfyn Cyflymder 40 mya Dros Dro) 2011 (WSI 2011 No. 2709)
- The A483 Trunk Road (Wrexham Bypass (Junction 2 - Junction 6), Wrexham) (Temporary 40 mph Speed Limit) Order 2011 (WSI 2011 No. 2709)
- Gorchymyn Cefnffordd yr A470 (Pwllan, i'r De o Landinam, Powys) (Cyfyngu a Gwahardd Traffig Dros Dro) 2011 (WSI 2011 No. 2732)
- The A470 Trunk Road (Pwllan, South of Llandinam, Powys) (Temporary Traffic Restrictions & Prohibition) Order 2011 (WSI 2011 No. 2732)
- Gorchymyn Cefnffordd yr A470 (Pont Caersŵs, Caersŵs, Powys) (Gwahardd Cerbydau Dros Dro) 2011 (WSI 2011 No. 2733)
- The A470 Trunk Road (Caersws Bridge, Caersws, Powys) (Temporary Prohibition of Vehicles) Order 2011 (WSI 2011 No. 2733)
- Gorchymyn Cefnffordd yr A494 (Golwg Hir, Gwynedd) (Cyfyngiadau a Gwaharddiadau Traffig Dros Dro) 2011 (WSI 2011 No. 2734)
- The A494 Trunk Road (Golwg Hir, Gwynedd) (Temporary Traffic Restrictions & Prohibitions) Order 2011 (WSI 2011 No. 2734)
- Gorchymyn Diogelu Bwyd (Gwaharddiadau Brys) (Ymbelydredd mewn Defaid) (Cymru) (Dirymu'n Rhannol) 2011 (WSI 2011 No. 2759 (Cy. 297))
- The Food Protection (Emergency Prohibitions) (Radioactivity in Sheep) (Wales) (Partial Revocation) Order 2011 (WSI 2011 No. 2759 (W. 297))
- Gorchymyn Traffordd yr M4 (Pont Maes y Gwernen, i'r Gorllewin o Gyffordd 45, Ynysforgan, Abertawe) (Terfyn Cyflymder 50 MYA Dros Dro a Chaniatáu Traffig ar y Llain Galed) 2011 (WSI 2011 No. 2786)
- The M4 Motorway (Maes y Gwernen Bridge, West of Junction 45, Ynysforgan, Swansea) (Temporary 50 MPH Speed Limit and Trafficking of Hard Shoulder) Order 2011 (WSI 2011 No. 2786)
- Gorchymyn Cefnffordd yr A470 (Comins-coch, Powys) (Gwahardd Cerbydau Dros Dro) 2011 (WSI 2011 No. 2787)
- The A470 Trunk Road (Commins Coch, Powys) (Temporary Prohibition of Vehicles) Order 2011 (WSI 2011 No. 2787)
- Gorchymyn Mesur Diwydiant Cig Coch (Cymru) 2010 (Cychwyn, Darpariaethau Trosiannol ac Arbed) 2011 (WSI 2011 No. 2802 (Cy. 300) (C. 97))
- The Red Meat Industry (Wales) Measure 2010 (Commencement, Transitional and Saving Provisions Order 2011 (WSI 2011 No. 2802 (W. 300) (C. 97))

== 301-400 ==
- Gorchymyn Traffordd yr M4 (Ffordd Ymuno tua'r Dwyrain wrth Gyffordd 37) (Y Pîl) (Bwrdeistref Sirol Pen-y-bont ar Ogwr) (Gwahardd Cerbydau Dros Dro) 2011 (WSI 2011 No. 2810)
- The M4 Motorway (Eastbound Entry Slip Road at Junction 37 (Pyle), Bridgend County Borough) (Temporary Prohibition of Vehicles) Order 2011 (WSI 2011 No. 2810)
- Gorchymyn Llifogydd ac Erydu Arfordirol Atodol (Cymru) 2011 (WSI 2011 No. 2829 (Cy. 302))
- The Incidental Flooding and Coastal Erosion (Wales) Order 2011 (WSI 2011 No. 2829 (W. 302))
- Gorchymyn Moch (Cofnodion, Adnabod a Symud) (Cymru) 2011 (WSI 2011 No. 2830 (Cy. 303))
- The Pigs (Records, Identification and Movement) (Wales) Order 2011 (WSI 2011 No. 2830 (W. 303))
- Gorchymyn Daliadau Amaethyddol (Unedau Cynhyrchu) (Cymru) 2011 (WSI 2011 No. 2831 (Cy. 304))
- The Agricultural Holdings (Units of Production) (Wales) Order 2011 (WSI 2011 No. 2831 (W. 304))
- The A470 Trunk Road (Carno, Powys) (Temporary Traffic Restrictions & Prohibitions) Order 2011 (WSI 2011 No. 2839)
- Gorchymyn yr A470 (Carno, Powys) (Cyfyngiadau a Gwaharddiadau Traffig Dros Dro) 2011 (WSI 2011 No. 2839)
- Gorchymyn Mesur Strategaethau ar gyfer Gofalwyr (Cymru) 2010 (Cychwyn) 2011 (WSI 2011 No. 2842 (Cy. 306) (C. 100))
- The Carers Strategies (Wales) Measure 2010 (Commencement) Order 2011 (WSI 2011 No. 2842 (W. 306) (C. 100))
- Gorchymyn Dynodi Gorfodi Sifil ar Dramgwyddau Parcio (Bwrdeistref Sirol Merthyr Tudful) 2011 (WSI 2011 No. 2868 (Cy. 307))
- The Civil Enforcement of Parking Contraventions (County Borough of Merthyr Tydfil) Designation Order 2011 (WSI 2011 No. 2868 (W. 307))
- Rheoliadau Perygl Llifogydd (Diwygio) (Cymru) 2011 (WSI 2011 No. 2880 (Cy. 308))
- The Flood Risk (Amendment) (Wales) Regulations 2011 (WSI 2011 No. 2880 (W. 308))
- Gorchymyn Cefnffordd yr A470 (Cyffordd 32, Cyfnewidfa Coryton, Caerdydd) (Terfyn Cyflymder 40 mya) 2011 (WSI 2011 No. 2887)
- The A470 Trunk Road (Junction 32, Coryton Interchange, Cardiff) (40 mph Speed Limit) Order 2011 (WSI 2011 No. 2887)
- Rheoliadau'r Gwasanaeth Iechyd Gwladol (Ffioedd Ymwelwyr Tramor) (Diwygio) (Cymru) 2011 (WSI 2011 No. 2906 (Cy. 310))
- The National Health Service (Charges to Overseas Visitors) (Amendment) (Wales) Regulations 2011 (WSI 2011 No. 2906 (W. 310))
- Rheoliadau'r Gwasanaeth Iechyd Gwladol (Gwasanaethau Fferyllol) (Diwygio) (Cymru) 2011 (WSI 2011 No. 2907 (Cy. 311))
- The National Health Service (Pharmaceutical Services) (Amendment) (Wales) Regulations 2011 (WSI 2011 No. 2907 (W. 311))
- Rheoliadau Cyngor Addysgu Cyffredinol Cymru (Swyddogaethau Disgyblu) (Diwygio) 2011 (WSI 2011 No. 2908 (Cy. 312))
- The General Teaching Council for Wales (Disciplinary Functions) (Amendment) Regulations 2011 (WSI 2011 No. 2908 (W. 312))
- Rheoliadau Ardaloedd Rheoli Mwg (Tanwyddau Awdurdodedig) (Cymru) (Diwygio) 2011 (WSI 2011 No. 2909 (Cy. 313))
- The Smoke Control Areas (Authorised Fuels) (Wales) (Amendment) Regulations 2011 (WSI 2011 No. 2909 (W. 313))
- Gorchymyn Abertawe (Cymunedau) 2011 (WSI 2011 No. 2932 (Cy. 314))
- The Swansea (Communities) Order 2011 (WSI 2011 No. 2932 (W. 314))
- Rheoliadau Strategaethau ar gyfer Gofalwyr (Cymru) 2011 (WSI 2011 No. 2939 (Cy. 315))
- The Carers Strategies (Wales) Regulations 2011 (WSI 2011 No. 2939 (W. 315))
- Rheoliadau Gwerthuso Athrawon Ysgol (Cymru) 2011 (WSI 2011 No. 2940 (Cy. 316))
- The School Teacher Appraisal (Wales) Regulations 2011 (WSI 2011 No. 2940 (W. 316))
- Rheoliadau Cynllun Taliad Sengl a Chynlluniau Cymorth y Polisi Amaethyddol Cyffredin (Trawsgydymffurfio) (Cymru) (Diwygio ) 2011 (WSI 2011 No. 2941 (Cy. 317))
- The Common Agricultural Policy Single Payment and Support Schemes (Cross Compliance) (Wales) (Amendment) Regulations 2011 (WSI 2011 No. 2941 (W. 317))
- Rheoliadau Iechyd Meddwl (Cydgysylltu Gofal a Chynllunio Gofal a Thriniaeth) (Cymru) 2011 (WSI 2011 No. 2942 (Cy. 318))
- The Mental Health (Care Co-ordination and Care and Treatment Planning) (Wales) Regulations 2011 (WSI 2011 No. 2942 (W. 318))
- Gorchymyn Mesur Diwydiant Cig Coch (Cymru) 2010 (Diwygio) 2011 (WSI 2011 No. 2946 (Cy. 319))
- The Red Meat Industry (Wales) Measure 2010 (Amendment) Order 2011 (WSI 2011 No. 2946 (W. 319))
- Rheoliadau'r Cynllun Lwfansau Tirlenwi (Cymru) (Diwygio) (Rhif 2) 2011 (WSI 2011 No. 3042 (Cy. 320))
- The Landfill Allowances Scheme (Wales) (Amendment) (No. 2) Regulations 2011 (WSI 2011 No. 3042 (W. 320))
- Gorchymyn Mesur Iechyd Meddwl (Cymru) 2010 (Cychwyn Rhif 1 a Darpariaeth Drosiannol) 2011 (WSI 2011 No. 3046 (C. 116) (Cy. 321))
- The Mental Health (Wales) Measure 2010 (Commencement No.1 and Transitional Provision) Order 2011 (WSI 2011 No. 3046 (C. 116) (W. 321))
- Gorchymyn Ymddiriedolaeth Gwasanaeth Iechyd Gwladol Iechyd Cyhoeddus Cymru (Cyfalaf Cychwynnol) (Cymru) 2011 (WSI 2011 No. 3047 (Cy. 322))
- The Public Health Wales National Health Service Trust (Originating Capital) (Wales) Order 2011 (WSI 2011 No. 3047 (W. 322))
- Gorchymyn Cefnffordd yr A465 (Yng Nghyffiniau Cylchfan Cefncoedycymer, Bwrdeistref Sirol Merthyr Tudful) (Gwahardd Cerbydau a Beicwyr Dros Dro) 2011 (WSI 2011 No. 3101)
- The A465 Trunk Road (In the Vicinity of Cefn Coed Roundabout, Merthyr Tydfil County Borough) (Temporary Prohibition of Vehicles & Cyclists) Order 2011 (WSI 2011 No. 3101)
