= List of Welsh statutory instruments, 2003 =

This is an incomplete list of Welsh statutory instruments made in 2003. Statutory instruments made by the Assembly are numbered in the main United Kingdom series with their own sub-series. The Welsh language has official equal status with the English language in Wales, so every statutory instrument made by the Assembly is officially published in both English and Welsh. Only the titles of the English-language version are reproduced here. The statutory instruments are secondary legislation, deriving their power from the acts of Parliament establishing and transferring functions and powers to the Welsh Assembly.

== 1-100 ==
- The Agricultural Holdings (Units of Production) (Wales) Order 2003 (S.I. 2003 No. 4 (W.2))
- Gorchymyn Daliadau Amaethyddol (Unedau Cynhyrchu) (Cymru) 2003 (S.I. 2003 Rhif 4 (Cy.2))
- The Housing (Right to Acquire and Right to Buy) (Designated Rural Areas and Designated Regions) (Wales) Order 2003 (S.I. 2003 No. 54 (W.5))
- Gorchymyn Tai (Hawl i Gaffael a Hawl i Brynu) (Ardaloedd Gwledig Dynodedig a Rhanbarthau Dynodedig) (Cymru) 2003 (S.I. 2003 Rhif 54 (Cy.5))
- The Seeds (Miscellaneous Amendments) Regulations (Wales) 2003 (S.I. 2003 No. 56 (W.6))
- Rheoliadau Hadau (Diwygiadau Amrywiol) (Cymru) 2003 (S.I. 2003 Rhif 56 (Cy.6))
- The Limited Liability Partnerships (Welsh Language Forms) Regulations 2003 (S.I. 2003 No. 61)
- Rheoliadau (Ffurflenni Cymraeg) Partneriaethau Atebolrwydd Cyfyngedig 2003 (S.I. 2003 Rhif 61)
- The Companies (Welsh Language Forms) Regulations 2003 (S.I. 2003 No. 62)
- Rheoliadau (Ffurflenni Cymraeg) Cwmnïau 2003 (S.I. 2003 Rhif 62)
- The Countryside Access (Dedication of Land as Access Land) (Wales) Regulations 2003 (S.I. 2003 No. 135 (W.9))
- Rheoliadau Mynediad i Gefn Gwlad (Cyflwyno Tir fel Tir Mynediad) (Cymru) 2003 (S.I. 2003 Rhif 135 (Cy.9))
- The National Health Service (General Dental Services) and (Dental Charges) (Amendment) (Wales) Regulations 2003 (S.I. 2003 No. 138 (W.10))
- Rheoliadau'r Gwasanaeth Iechyd Gwladol (Gwasanaethau Deintyddol Cyffredinol) a (Ffioedd Deintyddol) (Diwygio) (Cymru) 2003 (S.I. 2003 Rhif 138 (Cy.10))
- The National Health Service (General Medical Services) and (Pharmaceutical Services) (Amendment) (Wales) Regulations 2003 (S.I. 2003 No. 139 (W.11))
- Rheoliadau'r Gwasanaeth Iechyd Gwladol (Gwasanaethau Meddygol Cyffredinol) a (Gwasanaethau Fferyllol) (Diwygio) (Cymru) 2003 (S.I. 2003 Rhif 139 (Cy.11))
- The Education (Teachers' Qualifications and Health Standards) (Amendment) (Wales) Regulations 2003 (S.I. 2003 No. 140 (W.12))
- Rheoliadau Addysg (Cymwysterau a Safonau Iechyd Athrawon) (Diwygio) (Cymru) 2003 (S.I. 2003 Rhif 140 (Cy.12))
- The Countryside Access (Exclusion or Restriction of Access) (Wales) Regulations 2003 (S.I. 2003 No. 142 (W.14))
- Rheoliadau Mynediad i Gefn Gwlad (Gwahardd neu Gyfyngu Mynediad) (Cymru) 2003 (S.I. 2003 Rhif 142 (Cy.14))
- The National Health Service (General Medical Services) (Amendment) (Wales) Regulations 2003 (S.I. 2003 No. 143 (W.15))
- Rheoliadau'r Gwasanaeth Iechyd Gwladol (Gwasanaethau Meddygol Cyffredinol) (Diwygio) (Cymru) 2003 (S.I. 2003 Rhif 143 (Cy.15))
- The Local Authorities (Executive Arrangements) (Discharge of Functions) (Amendment) (Wales) Regulations 2003 (S.I. 2003 No. 147 (W.17))
- Rheoliadau Awdurdodau Lleol (Trefniadau Gweithrediaeth) (Cyflawni Swyddogaethau) (Diwygio) (Cymru) 2003 (S.I. 2003 Rhif 147 (Cy.17))
- The Local Health Boards (Establishment) (Wales) Order 2003 (S.I. 2003 No. 148 (W.18))
- Gorchymyn Byrddau Iechyd Lleol (Sefydlu) (Cymru) 2003 (S.I. 2003 Rhif 148 (Cy.18))
- The Local Health Boards (Constitution, Membership and Procedures) (Wales) Regulations 2003 (S.I. 2003 No. 149 (W.19))
- Rheoliadau Byrddau Iechyd Lleol (Cyfansoddiad, Aelodaeth a Gweithdrefnau) (Cymru) 2003 (S.I. 2003 Rhif 149 (Cy.19))
- The Local Health Boards (Functions) (Wales) Regulations 2003 (S.I. 2003 No. 150 (W.20))
- Rheoliadau'r Byrddau Iechyd Lleol (Swyddogaethau) (Cymru) 2003 (S.I. 2003 Rhif 150 (Cy.20))
- The Sheep Annual Premium (Amendment) (Wales) Regulations 2003 (S.I. 2003 No. 151 (W.21))
- Rheoliadau Premiwm Blynyddol Defaid (Diwygio) (Cymru) 2003 (S.I. 2003 Rhif 151 (Cy.21))
- The Care Standards Act 2000 (Commencement No. 10) and Transitional Provisions (Wales) Order 2003 (S.I. 2003 No. 152 (W.22) (C.8))
- Gorchymyn Deddf Safonau Gofal 2000 (Cychwyn Rhif 10) a Darpariaethau Trosiannol (Cymru) 2003 (S.I. 2003 Rhif 152 (Cy.22) (C.8))
- The Local Authorities Executive Arrangements (Functions and Responsibilities) (Amendment) (Wales) Regulations 2003 (S.I. 2003 No. 153 (W.23))
- Rheoliadau Trefniadau Gweithrediaeth Awdurdodau Lleol (Swyddogaethau a Chyfrifoldebau) (Diwygio) (Cymru) 2003 (S.I. 2003 Rhif 153 (Cy.23))
- The Health, Social Care and Well-being Strategies (Wales) Regulations 2003 (S.I. 2003 No. 154 (W.24))
- Rheoliadau Strategaethau Iechyd, Gofal Cymdeithasol a Llesiant (Cymru) 2003 (S.I. 2003 Rhif 154 (Cy.24))
- The Local Authorities (Alternative Arrangements) (Amendment) (Wales) Regulations 2003 (S.I. 2003 No. 155 (W.25))
- Rheoliadau Awdurdodau Lleol (Trefniadau Amgen) (Diwygio) (Cymru) 2003 (S.I. 2003 Rhif 155 (Cy.25))
- The Sheep and Goats Identification and Movement (Interim Measures) (Wales) (No.2) (Amendment) Order 2003 (S.I. 2003 No. 167 (W.27))
- Gorchymyn Adnabod a Symud Defaid a Geifr (Mesurau Dros Dro) (Cymru) (Rhif 2) (Diwygio) 2003 (S.I. 2003 Rhif 167 (Cy.27))
- The Disease Control (Interim Measures) (Wales) (No.2) (Amendment) Order 2003 (S.I. 2003 No. 168 (W.28))
- Gorchymyn Rheoli Clefydau (Mesurau Dros Dro) (Cymru) (Rhif 2) (Diwygio) 2003 (S.I. 2003 Rhif 168 (Cy.28))
- The Animal Gatherings (Interim Measures) (Wales) (Amendment) Order 2003 (S.I. 2003 No. 169 (W.29))
- Gorchymyn Crynoadau Anifeiliaid (Mesurau Dros Dro) (Cymru) (Diwygio) 2003 (S.I. 2003 Rhif 169 (Cy.29))
- The Pigs (Records, Identification and Movement) (Interim Measures) (Wales) (No. 2) (Amendment) Order 2003 (S.I. 2003 No. 170 (W.30))
- Gorchymyn Moch (Cofnodion, Adnabod a Symud) (Mesurau Dros Dro) (Cymru) (Rhif 2) (Diwygio) 2003 (S.I. 2003 Rhif 170 (Cy.30))
- The Adoption and Children Act 2002 (Commencement No. 1) (Wales) Order 2003 (S.I. 2003 No. 181 (W.39) (C.9))
- Gorchymyn Deddf Mabwysiadu a Phlant 2002 (Cychwyn Rhif 1) (Cymru) 2003 (S.I. 2003 Rhif 181 (Cy.31) (C.9))
- The Long Residential Tenancies (Principal Forms) (Amendment) (Wales) Regulations 2003 (S.I. 2003 No. 233 (W.33))
- Rheoliadau Tenantiaethau Preswyl Hir (Prif Ffurflenni) (Diwygio) (Cymru) 2003 (S.I. 2003 Rhif 233 (Cy.33))
- The Fostering Services (Wales) Regulations 2003 (S.I. 2003 No. 237 (W.35))
- Rheoliadau Gwasanaethau Maethu (Cymru) 2003 (S.I. 2003 Rhif 237 (Cy.35))
- The Allocation of Housing (Wales) Regulations 2003 (S.I. 2003 No. 239 (W.36))
- Rheoliadau Dyrannu Tai (Cymru) 2003 (S.I. 2003 Rhif 239 (Cy.36))
- The Education (Pupil Referral Units) (Appeals Against Permanent Exclusion) (Wales) Regulations 2003 (S.I. 2003 No. 287 (W.39))
- Rheoliadau Addysg (Unedau Cyfeirio Disgyblion) (Apelau yn erbyn Gwaharddiadau Parhaol) (Cymru) 2003 (S.I. 2003 Rhif 287 (Cy.39))
- The Road Traffic (Vehicle Emissions) (Fixed Penalty) (Wales) Regulations 2003 (S.I. 2003 No. 300 (W.42))
- Rheoliadau Traffig Ffyrdd (Allyriadau Cerbydau) (Cosbau Penodedig) 2003 (S.I. 2003 Rhif 300 (Cy.42))
- The National Health Service (Optical Charges and Payments) (Amendment) (Wales) Regulations 2003 (S.I. 2003 No. 301 (W.43))
- Rheoliadau'r Gwasanaeth Iechyd Gwladol (Ffioedd a Thaliadau Optegol) (Diwygio) (Cymru) 2003 (S.I. 2003 Rhif 301 (Cy.43))
- The Plastic Materials and Articles in Contact with Food (Amendment) (Wales) Regulations 2003 (S.I. 2003 No. 302 (W.44))
- Rheoliadau Deunyddiau ac Eitemau Plastig mewn Cysylltiad â Bwyd (Diwygio) (Cymru) 2003 (S.I. 2003 Rhif 302 (Cy.44))
- The Assured Tenancies and Agricultural Occupancies (Forms) (Amendment) (Wales) Regulations 2003 (S.I. 2003 No. 307 (W.46))
- Rheoliadau Tenantiaethau Sicr a Meddianaethau Amaethyddol Sicr (Ffurflenni) (Diwygio) (Cymru) 2003 (S.I. 2003 Rhif 307 (Cy.46))
- The Bluetongue (Wales) Order 2003 (S.I. 2003 No. 326 (W.47))
- Gorchymyn y Tafod Glas (Cymru) 2003 (S.I. 2003 Rhif 326 (Cy.47))
- The General Teaching Council for Wales (Constitution) (Amendment) Regulations 2003 (S.I. 2003 No. 389 (W.51))
- Rheoliadau Cyngor Addysgu Cyffredinol Cymru (Cyfansoddiad) (Diwygio) 2003 (S.I. 2003 Rhif 389 (Cy.51))
- The Town and Country Planning (Referrals and Appeals) (Written Representations Procedure) (Wales) Regulations 2003 (S.I. 2003 No. 390 (W.52))
- Rheoliadau Cynllunio Gwlad a Thref (Atgyfeiriadau ac Apelau) (Gweithdrefn Sylwadau Ysgrifenedig) (Cymru) 2003 (S.I. 2003 Rhif 390 (Cy.52))
- The Town and Country Planning (Enforcement Notices and Appeals) (Wales) Regulations 2003 (S.I. 2003 No. 394 (W.53))
- Rheoliadau Cynllunio Gwlad a Thref (Hysbysiadau Gorfodi ac Apelau) (Cymru) 2003 (S.I. 2003 Rhif 394 (Cy.53))
- The Town and Country Planning (Enforcement) (Written Representations Procedure) (Wales) Regulations 2003 (S.I. 2003 No. 395 (W.54))
- Rheoliadau Cynllunio Gwlad a Thref (Gorfodi) (Gweithdrefn Sylwadau Ysgrifenedig) (Cymru) 2003 (S.I. 2003 Rhif 395 (Cy.54))
- The Local Authorities (Referendums) (Petitions and Directions) (Amendment) (Wales) Regulations 2003 (S.I. 2003 No. 398 (W.55))
- Rheoliadau Awdurdodau Lleol (Refferenda) (Deisebau a Chyfarwyddiadau) (Diwygio) (Cymru) 2003 (S.I. 2003 Rhif 398 (Cy.55))
- The Movement of Animals (Restrictions) (Wales) Order 2003 (S.I. 2003 No. 399 (W.56))
- Gorchymyn Symud Anifeiliaid (Cyfyngiadau) (Cymru) 2003 (S.I. 2003 Rhif 399 (Cy.56))
- The M4 Motorway Slip Road (Junction 44, Lon-Las) Scheme 2003 (S.I. 2003 No. 406 (W.57))
- Cynllun Fordd Ymuno Traffordd yr M4 (Cyffordd 44, Lô n-Las) 2003 (S.I. 2003 Rhif 406 (Cy.57))
- The Agricultural Subsidies (Appeals) (Wales) (Amendment) Regulations 2003 (S.I. 2003 No. 411 (W.58))
- Rheoliadau Cymorthdaliadau Amaethyddol (Apelau) (Cymru) (Diwygio) 2003 (S.I. 2003 Rhif 411 (Cy.58))
- The Non-Domestic Rating (Demand Notices) (Amendment) (Wales) Regulations 2003 (S.I. 2003 No. 414 (W.59))
- Rheoliadau Ardrethu Annomestig (Hysbysiadau Galw am Dalu) (Diwygio) (Cymru) 2003 (S.I. 2003 Rhif 414 (Cy.59))
- The Prohibition of Keeping or Release of Live Fish (Specified Species) (Amendment) (Wales) Order 2003 (S.I. 2003 No. 416 (W.60))
- Gorchymyn Gwahardd Cadw neu Ollwng Pysgod Byw (Rhywogaethau Penodedig) (Diwygio) (Cymru) 2003 (S.I. 2003 Rhif 416 (Cy.60))
- The Local Health Boards (Transfer of Property, Rights and Liabilities) (Wales) Order 2003 (S.I. 2003 No. 473 (W.63))
- Gorchymyn y Byrddau Iechyd Lleol (Trosglwyddo Eiddo, Hawliau a Rhwymedigaethau) (Cymru) 2003 (S.I. 2003 Rhif 473 (Cy.63))
- The Animal Gatherings (Interim Measures) (Wales) Order 2003 (S.I. 2003 No. 481 (W.67))
- Gorchymyn Crynoadau Anifeiliaid (Mesurau Dros Dro) (Cymru) 2003 (S.I. 2003 Rhif 481 (Cy.67))
- The Transport of Animals (Cleansing and Disinfection) (Wales) Order 2003 (S.I. 2003 No. 482 (W.68))
- Gorchymyn Cludo Anifeiliaid (Glanhau a Diheintio) (Cymru) 2003 (S.I. 2003 Rhif 482 (Cy.68))
- The Disease Control (Interim Measures) (Wales) Order 2003 (S.I. 2003 No. 483 (W.69))
- Gorchymyn Rheoli Clefydau (Mesurau Dros Dro) (Cymru) 2003 (S.I. 2003 Rhif 483 (Cy.69))
- The Care Standards Act 2000 (Commencement No.11) (Wales) Order 2003 (S.I. 2003 No. 501 (W.70) (C.27))
- Gorchymyn Deddf Safonau Gofal 2000 (Cychwyn Rhif 11) (Cymru) 2003 (S.I. 2003 Rhif 501 (Cy.70) (C.27))
- The General Teaching Council for Wales (Disciplinary Functions) (Amendment) Regulations 2003 (S.I. 2003 No. 503 (W.71))
- Rheoliadau Cyngor Addysgu Cyffredinol Cymru (Swyddogaethau Disgyblu) (Diwygio) 2003 (S.I. 2003 Rhif 503 (Cy.71))
- The Council Tax (Administration and Enforcement) (Amendment) (Wales) Regulations 2003 (S.I. 2003 No. 522 (W.72))
- Rheoliadau'r Dreth Gyngor (Gweinyddu a Gorfodi) (Diwygio) (Cymru) 2003 (S.I. 2003 Rhif 522 (Cy.72))
- The Police Reform Act 2002 (Commencement) (Wales) Order 2003 (S.I. 2003 No. 525 (W.73) (C.28))
- Gorchymyn Deddf Diwygio'r Heddlu 2002 (Cychwyn) (Cymru) 2003 (S.I. 2003 Rhif 525 (Cy.73) (C.28))
- The Tir Gofal (Amendment) (Wales) Regulations 2003 (S.I. 2003 No. 529 (W.74))
- Rheoliadau Tir Gofal (Diwygio) (Cymru) 2003 (S.I. 2003 Rhif 529 (Cy.74))
- The Financing of Maintained Schools (Amendment) (Wales) Regulations 2003 (S.I. 2003 No. 538 (W.75))
- Rheoliadau Ariannu Ysgolion a Gynhelir (Diwygio) (Cymru) 2003 (S.I. 2003 Rhif 538 (Cy.75))
- The Education (Supply of Information) (Wales) Regulations 2003 (S.I. 2003 No. 542 (W.76))
- Rheoliadau Addysg (Cyflenwi Gwybodaeth) (Cymru) 2003 (S.I. 2003 Rhif 542 (Cy.76))
- The Education (Induction Arrangements for School Teachers) (Wales) Regulations 2003 (S.I. 2003 No. 543 (W.77))
- Rheoliadau (Trefniadau Ymsefydlu ar gyfer Athrawon Ysgol) (Cymru) 2003 (S.I. 2003 Rhif 543 (Cy.77))
- The Sea Fishing (Enforcement of Community Control Measures) (Wales) (Amendment) Order 2003 (S.I. 2003 No. 559 (W.79))
- Gorchymyn Pysgota Môr (Gorfodi Mesurau Rheoli'r Gymuned) (Cymru) (Diwygio) 2003 (S.I. 2003 Rhif 559 (Cy.79))
- The Shellfish (Specified Sea Area) (Prohibition of Fishing Methods) (Wales) Order 2003 (S.I. 2003 No. 607 (W.81))
- Gorchymyn Pysgod Cregyn (Ardal Fôr Benodedig) (Gwahardd Dulliau Pysgota) (Cymru) 2003 (S.I. 2003 Rhif 607 (Cy.81))
- The Council Tax (Discount Disregards) (Amendment) (Wales) Order 2003 (S.I. 2003 No. 673 (W.83))
- Gorchymyn Treth Gyngor (Diystyru Gostyngiad) (Diwygio) (Cymru) 2003 (S.I. 2003 Rhif 673 (Cy.83))
- The Revenue Support Grant (Specified Bodies) (Amendment) (Wales) Regulations 2003 (S.I. 2003 No. 706 (W.85))
- Rheoliadau Grant Cynnal Refeniw (Cyrff Penodedig) (Diwygio) (Cymru) 2003 (S.I. 2003 Rhif 706 (Cy.85))
- The Local Authority Adoption Service and Miscellaneous Amendments (Wales) Regulations 2003 (S.I. 2003 No. 710 (W.86))
- Rheoliadau Gwasanaethau Mabwysiadu Awdurdodau Lleol a Diwygiadau Amrywiol (Cymru) 2003 (S.I. 2003 Rhif 710 (Cy.86))
- The Health and Social Care Act 2001 (Commencement No. 4) (Wales) Order 2003 (S.I. 2003 No. 713 (W.87) (C.36))
- Gorchymyn Deddf Iechyd a Gofal Cymdeithasol 2001 (Cychwyn Rhif 4) (Cymru) 2003 (S.I. 2003 Rhif 713 (Cy.87) (C.36))
- The Waste Management Licensing (Amendment) (Wales) Regulations 2003 (S.I. 2003 No. 780 (W.91))
- Rheoliadau Trwyddedu Rheoli Gwastraff (Diwygio) (Cymru) 2003 (S.I. 2003 Rhif 780 (Cy.91))
- The Residential Family Centres (Wales) Regulations 2003 (S.I. 2003 No. 781 (W.92))
- Rheoliadau Canolfannau Preswyl i Deuluoedd (Cymru) 2003 (S.I. 2003 Rhif 781 (Cy.92))
- The National Health Service (General Dental Services) (Amendment) (Wales) Regulations 2003 (S.I. 2003 No. 782 (W.93))
- Rheoliadau'r Gwasanaeth Iechyd Gwladol (Gwasanaethau Deintyddol Cyffredinol) (Diwygio) (Cymru) 2003 (S.I. 2003 Rhif 782 (Cy.93))
- The National Health Service (Pharmaceutical Services) (Amendment) (Wales) Regulations 2003 (S.I. 2003 No. 783 (W.94))
- Rheoliadau'r Gwasanaeth Iechyd Gwladol (Gwasanaethau Fferyllol) (Diwygio) (Cymru) 2003 (S.I. 2003 Rhif 783 (Cy.94))
- The National Health Service (General Medical Services) (Amendment) (No. 2) (Wales) Regulations 2003 (S.I. 2003 No. 784 (W.95))
- Rheoliadau'r Gwasanaeth Iechyd Gwladol (Gwasanaethau Meddygol Cyffredinol) (Diwygio) (Rhif 2) (Cymru) 2003 (S.I. 2003 Rhif 784 (Cy.95))
- The Housing (Right to Buy) (Limits of Discount) (Amendment) (Wales) Order 2003 (S.I. 2003 No. 803 (W.97))
- Gorchymyn Tai (Hawl i Brynu) (Terfynau'r Disgownt) (Diwygio) (Cymru) 2003 (S.I. 2003 Rhif 803 (Cy.97))
- The Health Authorities (Transfer of Functions, Staff, Property, Rights and Liabilities and Abolition) (Wales) Order 2003 (S.I. 2003 No. 813 (W.98))
- Gorchymyn Awdurdodau Iechyd (Trosglwyddo Swyddogaethau, Staff, Eiddo, Hawliau a Rhwymedigaethau a Diddymu) (Cymru) 2003 (S.I. 2003 Rhif 813 (Cy.98))
- The Health Authorities (Transfer of Functions, Staff, Property, Rights and Liabilities and Abolition) (Wales) (Amendment) Order 2003 (S.I. 2003 No. 814 (W.99))
- Gorchymyn Awdurdodau Iechyd (Trosglwyddo Swyddogaethau, Staff, Eiddo, Hawliau a Rhwymedigaethau a Diddymu) (Cymru) (Diwygio) 2003 (S.I. 2003 Rhif 814 (Cy.99))
- The Powys Local Health Board (Additional Functions) (Regulations 2003 (S.I. 2003 No. 815 (W.100))
- Rheoliadau Bwrdd Iechyd Lleol Powys (Swyddogaethau Ychwanegol) 2003 (S.I. 2003 Rhif 815 (Cy.100))

== 101-200 ==
- The Local Health Boards (Functions) (Amendment) Regulations 2003 (S.I. 2003 No. 816 (W.101))
- Rheoliadau'r Byrddau Iechyd Lleol (Swyddogaethau) (Diwygio) 2003 (S.I. 2003 Rhif 816 (Cy.101))
- The Powys Health Care National Health Service Trust (Dissolution) Order 2003 (S.I. 2003 No. 817 (W.102))
- Gorchymyn Ymddiriedolaeth Gwasanaeth Iechyd Gwladol Gofal Iechyd Powys (Diddymu) 2003 (S.I. 2003 Rhif 817 (Cy.102))
- The Local Health Boards (Transfer of Staff) (Wales) Order 2003 (S.I. 2003 No. 818 (W.103))
- Gorchymyn y Byrddau Iechyd Lleol (Trosglwyddo Staff) (Cymru) 2003 (S.I. 2003 Rhif 818 (Cy.103))
- The Food Labelling (Amendment) (Wales) Regulations 2003 (S.I. 2003 No. 832 (W.104))
- Rheoliadau Labelu Bwyd (Diwygio) (Cymru) 2003 (S.I. 2003 Rhif 832 (Cy.104))
- The National Health Service (General Ophthalmic Services) (Amendment) (Wales) Regulations 2003 (S.I. 2003 No. 837 (W.106))
- Rheoliadau'r Gwasanaeth Iechyd Gwladol (Gwasanaethau Offthalmig Cyffredinol) (Diwygio) (Cymru) 2003 (S.I. 2003 Rhif 837 (Cy.106))
- The Education (Remission of Charges Relating to Residential Trips) (Wales) Regulations 2003 (S.I. 2003 No. 860 (W.107))
- Rheoliadau Addysg (Peidio â Chodi Tâl sy'n Ymwneud â Theithiau Preswyl) (Cymru) 2003 (S.I. 2003 Rhif 860 (Cy.107))
- The Education (Outturn Statements) (Wales) Regulations 2003 (S.I. 2003 No. 873 (W.109))
- Rheoliadau Addysg (Datganiadau Alldro) (Cymru) 2003 (S.I. 2003 Rhif 873 (Cy.109))
- The Education (Free School Lunches) (Prescribed Tax Credits) (Wales) Order 2003 (S.I. 2003 No. 879 (W.110))
- Gorchymyn Addysg (Ciniawau Ysgol Rhad ac am Ddim) (Credydau Treth Rhagnodedig) (Cymru) 2003 (S.I. 2003 Rhif 879 (Cy.110))
- The Education (School Lunches) (Prescribed Requirement) (Wales) Order 2003 (S.I. 2003 No. 880 (W.111))
- Gorchymyn Addysg (Ciniawau Ysgol) (Gofyniad Rhagnodedig) (Cymru) 2003 (S.I. 2003 Rhif 880 (Cy.111))
- The National Assistance (Sums for Personal Requirements) (Wales) Regulations 2003 (S.I. 2003 No. 892 (W.112))
- Rheoliadau Cymorth Gwladol (Symiau at Anghenion Personol) (Cymru) 2003 (S.I. 2003 Rhif 892 (Cy.112))
- The Education (Nursery Education and Early Years Development and Childcare Plans) (Wales) Regulations 2003 (S.I. 2003 No. 893 (W.113))
- Rheoliadau Addysg (Addysg Feithrin a Chynlluniau Datblygu Blynyddoedd Cynnar a Gofal Plant) (Cymru) 2003 (S.I. 2003 Rhif 893 (Cy.113))
- The Local Authorities (Capital Finance) (Rate of Discount for 2003/2004) (Wales) Regulations 2003 (S.I. 2003 No. 894 (W.114))
- Rheoliadau Awdurdodau Lleol (Cyllid Cyfalaf) (Cyfradd y Disgownt ar gyfer 2003/2004) (Cymru) 2003 (S.I. 2003 Rhif 894 (Cy.114))
- The Local Authorities (Allowances for Members of Community Councils) (Wales) Regulations 2003 (S.I. 2003 No. 895 (W.115))
- Rheoliadau Awdurdodau Lleol (Lwfansau i Aelodau Cynghorau Cymuned) (Cymru) 2003 (S.I. 2003 Rhif 895 (Cy.115))
- The Fostering Services (Wales) (Amendment) Regulations 2003 (S.I. 2003 No. 896 (W.116))
- Rheoliadau Gwasanaethau Maethu (Cymru) (Diwygio) 2003 (S.I. 2003 Rhif 896 (Cy.116))
- The National Assistance (Assessment of Resources) (Amendment) (Wales) Regulations 2003 (S.I. 2003 No. 897 (W.117))
- Rheoliadau Cymorth Gwladol (Asesu Adnoddau) (Diwygio) (Cymru) 2003 (S.I. 2003 Rhif 897 (Cy.117))
- The Local Authorities (Capital Finance) (Amendment) (Wales) Regulations 2003 (S.I. 2003 No. 915 (W.118))
- Rheoliadau Awdurdodau Lleol (Cyllid Cyfalaf) (Diwygio) (Cymru) 2003 (S.I. 2003 Rhif 915 (Cy.118))
- The Individual Learning Accounts Wales Regulations 2003 (S.I. 2003 No. 918 (W.119))
- Rheoliadau Cyfrifon Dysgu Unigol Cymru 2003 (S.I. 2003 Rhif 918 (Cy.119))
- The National Assistance (Residential Accommodation)(Additional Payments, Relevant Contributions and Assessment of Resources)(Wales) Regulations 2003 (S.I. 2003 No. 931 (W.121))
- Rheoliadau Cymorth Gwladol (Llety Preswyl) (Taliadau Ychwanegol, Cyfraniadau Perthnasol ac Asesu Adnoddau) (Cymru) 2003 (S.I. 2003 Rhif 931 (Cy.121))
- The Basic Curriculum for Wales (Amendment) Order 2003 (S.I. 2003 No. 932 (W.122))
- Gorchymyn y Cwricwlwm Sylfaenol ar gyfer Cymru (Diwygio) 2003 (S.I. 2003 Rhif 932 (W.122))
- The Health and Social Care Act 2001 (Commencement No. 5) (Wales) Order 2003 (S.I. 2003 No. 939 (W.123) (C.50))
- Gorchymyn Deddf Iechyd a Gofal Cymdeithasol 2001 (Cychwyn Rhif 5) (Cymru) 2003 (S.I. 2003 Rhif 939 (Cy.123) (C.50))
- The Bus Service Operators Grant (Amendment) (Wales) Regulations 2003 (S.I. 2003 No. 943 (W.124))
- Rheoliadau Grant Gweithredwyr Gwasanaethau Bysiau (Diwygio) (Cymru) 2003 (S.I. 2003 Rhif 943 (Cy.124))
- The Non-Domestic Rating (Utilities) (Rateable Value) (Amendment) (Wales) Order 2003 (S.I. 2003 No. 944 (W.125))
- Gorchymyn Ardrethu Annomestig (Cyfleustodau) (Gwerth Ardrethol) (Diwygio) (Cymru) 2003 (S.I. 2003 Rhif 944 (Cy.125))
- The Miscellaneous Food Additives (Amendment) (Wales) Regulations 2003 (S.I. 2003 No. 945 (W.126))
- Rheoliadau Ychwanegion Bwyd Amrywiol (Diwygio) (Cymru) 2003 (S.I. 2003 Rhif 945 (Cy.126))
- The Sheep and Goats Identification and Movement (Interim Measures) (Wales) (No.2) (Amendment) (No.2) Order 2003 (S.I. 2003 No. 946 (W.127))
- Gorchymyn Adnabod a Symud Defaid a Geifr (Mesurau Dros Dro) (Cymru) (Rhif 2) (Diwygio) (Rhif 2) 2003 (S.I. 2003 Rhif 946 (Cy.127))
- The Care Homes (Amendment) (Wales) Regulations 2003 (S.I. 2003 No. 947 (W.128))
- Rheoliadau Cartrefi Gofal (Diwygio) (Cymru) 2003 (S.I. 2003 Rhif 947 (Cy.128))
- The National Assistance (Residential Accommodation) (Disregarding of Resources) (Wales) Regulations 2003 (S.I. 2003 No. 969 (W.131))
- Rheoliadau Cymorth Gwladol (Llety Preswyl) (Diystyru Adnoddau) (Cymru) 2003 (S.I. 2003 Rhif 969 (Cy.131))
- The Administration of the Rent Officer Service (Wales) Order 2003 (S.I. 2003 No. 973 (W.132))
- Gorchymyn Gweinyddu Gwasanaeth y Swyddogion Rhenti (Cymru) 2003 (S.I. 2003 Rhif 973 (Cy.132))
- The Preserved Counties (Amendment to Boundaries) (Wales) Order 2003 (S.I. 2003 No. 974 (W.133))
- Gorchymyn Siroedd Wedi'u Cadw (Newid Ffiniau) (Cymru) 2003 (S.I. 2003 Rhif 974 (Cy.133))
- The National Health Service (Travelling Expenses and Remission of Charges) (Amendment) (Wales) Regulations 2003 (S.I. 2003 No. 975 (W.134))
- Rheoliadau'r Gwasanaeth Iechyd Gwladol (Treuliau Teithio a Pheidio â Chodi Tâl) (Diwygio) (Cymru) 2003 (S.I. 2003 Rhif 975 (Cy.134))
- The Products of Animal Origin (Third Country Imports) (Wales) (Amendment) Regulations 2003 (S.I. 2003 No. 976 (W.135))
- Rheoliadau Cynhyrchion sy'n Deillio o Anifeiliaid (Mewnforion Trydydd Gwledydd) (Cymru) (Diwygio) 2003 (S.I. 2003 Rhif 976 (Cy.135))
- The Feeding Stuffs (Amendment) (Wales) Regulations 2003 (S.I. 2003 No. 989 (W.138))
- Rheoliadau Porthiant (Diwygio) (Cymru) 2003 (S.I. 2003 Rhif 989 (Cy.138))
- The Leasehold Reform (Collective Enfranchisement) (Counter-notices) (Wales) Regulations 2003 (S.I. 2003 No. 990 (W.139))
- Rheoliadau Diwygio Lesddaliad (Rhyddfreinio ar y Cyd) (Gwrth-hysbysiadau) (Cymru) 2003 (S.I. 2003 Rhif 990 (Cy.139))
- The Leasehold Reform (Notices) (Amendment) (Wales) Regulations 2003 (S.I. 2003 No. 991 (W.140))
- Rheoliadau Diwygio Lesddaliad (Hysbysiadau) (Diwygio) (Cymru) 2003 (S.I. 2003 Rhif 991 (Cy.140))
- The Zoo Licensing Act 1981 (Amendment) (Wales) Regulations 2003 (S.I. 2003 No. 992 (W.141))
- Rheoliadau Deddf Trwyddedu Sŵau 1981 (Diwygio) (Cymru) 2003 (S.I. 2003 Rhif 992 (Cy.141))
- Commission For Health Improvement (Functions) (Wales) Regulations 2003 (S.I. 2003 No. 993 (W.142))
- Rheoliadau'r Comisiwn Gwella Iechyd (Swyddogaethau) (Cymru) 2003 (S.I. 2003 Rhif 993 (Cy.142))
- The Commons Registration (General) (Amendment) (Wales) Regulations 2003 (S.I. 2003 No. 994 (W.143))
- Rheoliadau Cofrestru Tir Comin (Cyffredinol) (Diwygio) (Cymru) 2003 (S.I. 2003 Rhif 994 (Cy.143))
- The Care Homes (Wales) (Amendment No.2) Regulations 2003 (S.I. 2003 No. 1004 (W.144))
- Rheoliadau Cartrefi Gofal (Cymru) (Diwygio Rhif 2) 2003 (S.I. 2003 Rhif 1004 (Cy.144))
- The National Health Service (General Medical Services) (Amendment) (No.3) (Wales) Regulations 2003 (S.I. 2003 No. 1005 (W.145))
- Rheoliadau'r Gwasanaeth Iechyd Gwladol (Gwasanaethau Meddygol Cyffredinol) (Diwygio) (Rhif 3) (Cymru) 2003 (S.I. 2003 Rhif 1005 (Cy.145))
- The Diseases of Poultry (Wales) Order 2003 (S.I. 2003 No. 1079 (W.148))
- Gorchymyn Clefydau Dofednod (Cymru) 2003 (S.I. 2003 Rhif 1079 (Cy.148))
- The Food (Pistachios from Iran) (Emergency Control) (Wales) Regulations 2003 (S.I. 2003 No. 1119 (W.150))
- Rheoliadau Bwyd (Cnau Pistasio o Iran) (Rheolaeth Frys) (Cymru) 2003 (S.I. 2003 Rhif 1119 (Cy.150))
- The Housing (Right to Acquire and Right to Buy) (Designated Rural Areas and Designated Regions) (Amendment) (Wales) Order 2003 (S.I. 2003 No. 1147 (W.155))
- Gorchymyn Tai (Hawl i Gaffael a Hawl i Brynu) (Ardaloedd Gwledig Dynodedig a Rhanbarthau Dynodedig) (Diwygio) (Cymru) 2003 (S.I. 2003 Rhif 1147 (Cy.155))
- The Disease Control (Interim Measures) (Wales) (No.2) Order 2003 (S.I. 2003 No. 1414 (W.166))
- Gorchymyn Rheoli Clefydau (Mesurau Dros Dro) (Cymru) (Rhif 2) 2003 (S.I. 2003 Rhif 1414 (Cy.166 ))
- The Transport of Animals (Cleansing and Disinfection) (Wales) (No.2) Order 2003 (S.I. 2003 No. 1470 (W.172))
- Gorchymyn Cludo Anifeiliaid (Glanhau a Diheintio) (Cymru) (Rhif 2) 2003 (S.I. 2003 Rhif 1470 (Cy.172))
- The Adoption of Children from Overseas (Wales)(Amendment) Regulations 2003 (S.I. 2003 No. 1634 (W.176))
- Rheoliadau Mabwysiadu Plant o Wledydd Tramor (Cymru) (Diwygio) 2003 (S.I. 2003 Rhif 1634 (Cy.176))
- The Fish Labelling (Wales) Regulations 2003 (S.I. 2003 No. 1635 (W.177))
- Rheoliadau Labelu Pysgod (Cymru) 2003 (S.I. 2003 Rhif 1635 (Cy.177))
- The Feeding Stuffs (Sampling and Analysis), the Feeding Stuffs (Enforcement) and the Feeding Stuffs (Establishments and Intermediaries) (Amendment) (Wales) Regulations 2003 (S.I. 2003 No. 1677 (W.180))
- Rheoliadau Porthiant (Samplu a Dadansoddi), Porthiant (Gorfodi) a Phorthiant (Sefydliadau a Chyfryngwyr) (Diwygio) (Cymru) 2003 (S.I. 2003 Rhif 1677 (Cy.180))
- The Sweeteners in Food (Amendment) (Wales) Regulations 2003 (S.I. 2003 No. 1713 (W.181))
- Rheoliadau Melysyddion mewn Bwyd (Diwygio) (Cymru) 2003 (S.I. 2003 Rhif 1713 (Cy.181))
- The Non-Domestic Rating (Collection and Enforcement)(Local Lists) (Amendment) (Wales) Regulations 2003 (S.I. 2003 No. 1714 (W.182))
- Rheoliadau Ardrethu Annomestig (Casglu a Gorfodi) (Rhestri Lleol) (Diwygio) (Cymru) 2003 (S.I. 2003 Rhif 1714 (Cy.182))
- The Council Tax (Administration and Enforcement) (Amendment No.2) (Wales) Regulations 2003 (S.I. 2003 No. 1715 (W.183))
- Rheoliadau'r Dreth Gyngor (Gweinyddu a Gorfodi) (Diwygio Rhif 2) (Cymru) 2003 (S.I. 2003 Rhif 1715 (Cy.183))
- The Education Act 2002 (Transitional Provisions and Consequential Amendments) (Wales) Regulations 2003 (S.I. 2003 No. 1717 (W.184))
- Rheoliadau Deddf Addysg 2002 (Darpariaethau Trosiannol a Diwygiadau Canlyniadol) (Cymru) 2003 (S.I. 2003 Rhif 1717 (Cy.184))
- The Education Act 2002 (Commencement No. 2) (Wales) Order 2003 (S.I. 2003 No. 1718 (W.185) (C.72))
- Gorchymyn Deddf Addysg 2002 (Cychwyn Rhif 2) (Cymru) 2003 (S.I. 2003 Rhif 1718 (Cy.185) (C.72))
- The Food Supplements (Wales) Regulations 2003 (S.I. 2003 No. 1719 (W.186))
- Rheoliadau Ychwanegion Bwyd (Cymru) 2003 (S.I. 2003 Rhif 1719 (Cy.186))
- The Environmental Protection (Duty of Care) (Amendment) (Wales) Regulations 2003 (S.I. 2003 No. 1720 (W.187))
- Rheoliadau Diogelu'r Amgylchedd (Dyletswydd Gofal) (Diwygio) (Cymru) 2003 (S.I. 2003 Rhif 1720 (Cy.187))
- The Contaminants in Food (Wales) Regulations 2003 (S.I. 2003 No. 1721 (W.188))
- Rheoliadau Halogion mewn Bwyd (Cymru) 2002 (S.I. 2003 Rhif 1721 (Cy.188))
- The Welfare of Farmed Animals (Wales) (Amendment) Regulations 2003 (S.I. 2003 No. 1726 (W.189))
- Rheoliadau Lles Anifeiliaid a Ffermir (Cymru) (Diwygio) 2003 (S.I. 2003 Rhif 1726 (Cy.189))
- The Education (School Organisation Plans) (Wales) Regulations 2003 (S.I. 2003 No. 1732 (W.190))
- Rheoliadau Addysg (Cynlluniau Trefniadaeth Ysgolion) (Cymru) 2003 (S.I. 2003 Rhif 1732 (Cy.190))
- The Food Safety (Ships and Aircraft) (Wales) Order 2003 (S.I. 2003 No. 1774 (W.191))
- Gorchymyn Diogelwch Bwyd (Llongau ac Awyrennau) (Cymru) 2003 (S.I. 2003 Rhif 1774 (Cy.191))
- The Common Agricultural Policy (Wine) (Wales) (Amendment) Regulations 2003 (S.I. 2003 No. 1776 (W.192))
- Rheoliadau'r Polisi Amaethyddol Cyffredin (Gwin) (Cymru) (Diwygio) 2003 (S.I. 2003 Rhif 1776 (Cy.192))
- The Education (Assisted Places) (Incidental Expenses) (Amendment) (Wales) Regulations 2003 (S.I. 2003 No. 1779 (W.193))
- Rheoliadau Addysg (Lleoedd a Gynorthwyir) (Mân Dreuliau) (Diwygio) (Cymru) 2003 (S.I. 2003 Rhif 1779 (Cy.193))
- The Protection of Animals (Anaesthetics) Amendment (Wales) Order 2003 (S.I. 2003 No. 1844 (W.196))
- Gorchymyn Diogelu Anifeiliaid (Anesthetyddion) Diwygio (Cymru) 2003 (S.I. 2003 Rhif 1844 (Cy.196))
- The Coast Protection (Notices) (Wales) Regulations 2003 (S.I. 2003 No. 1847 (W.197))
- Rheoliadau Diogelu'r Arfordir (Hysbysiadau) (Cymru) 2003 (S.I. 2003 Rhif 1847 (Cy.197))
- The Air Quality (Ozone) (Wales) Regulations 2003 (S.I. 2003 No. 1848 (W.198))
- Rheoliadau Ansawdd Aer (Osôn) (Cymru) 2003 (S.I. 2003 Rhif . 1848 (Cy.198)])
- The Animal By-Products (Identification) (Amendment) (Wales) Regulations 2003 (S.I. 2003 No. 1849 (W.199))
- Rheoliadau Sgil-gynhyrchion Anifeiliaid (Adnabod) (Diwygio) (Cymru) 2003 (S.I. 2003 Rhif 1849 (Cy.199))
- The Feeding Stuffs, the Feeding Stuffs (Sampling and Analysis) and the Feeding Stuffs (Enforcement) (Amendment) (Wales) Regulations 2003 (S.I. 2003 No. 1850 (W.200))
- Rheoliadau Porthiant, Porthiant (Samplu a Dadansoddi) a Phorthiant (Gorfodi) (Diwygio) (Cymru) 2003 (S.I. 2003 Rhif 1850 (Cy.200))

== 201-300 ==
- The Plant Health (Amendment) (Wales) Order 2003 (S.I. 2003 No. 1851 (W.201))
- Gorchymyn Iechyd Planhigion (Diwygio) (Cymru) 2003 (S.I. 2003 1851 Rhif (Cy.201)])
- The Action Programme for Nitrate Vulnerable Zones (Amendment) (Wales) Regulations 2003 (S.I. 2003 No. 1852 (W. 202))
- Rheoliadau'r Rhaglen Weithredu ar gyfer Parthau Perygl Nitradau (Diwygio) (Cymru) 2003 (S.I. 2003 Rhif 1852 (Cy. 202))
- The Housing (Right to Buy) (Priority of Charges) (Wales) Order 2003 (S.I. 2003 No. 1853 (W.203))
- Gorchymyn Tai (Hawl i Brynu) (Blaenoriaeth Arwystlon) (Cymru) 2003 (S.I. 2003 Rhif 1853 (Cy.203))
- The Education (Assisted Places) (Amendment) (Wales) Regulations 2003 (S.I. 2003 No. 1854 (W.204))
- Rheoliadau Addysg (Lleoedd a Gynorthwyir) (Diwygio) (Cymru) 2003 (S.I. 2003 Rhif 1854 (Cy.204))
- The Prohibition of Fishing with Multiple Trawls (Wales) Order 2003 (S.I. 2003 No. 1855 (W.205))
- Gorchymyn Gwahardd Pysgota â Threillrwydi Lluosog (Cymru) 2003 (S.I. 2003 Rhif 1855 (Cy.205))
- The Home Loss Payments (Prescribed Amounts) (Wales) Regulations 2003 (S.I. 2003 No. 1856 (W.206))
- Rheoliadau Taliadau Colli Cartref (Symiau Rhagnodedig) (Cymru) 2003 (S.I. 2003 Rhif 1856 (Cy.206))
- The Coast Protection (Variation of Excluded Waters) (River Teifi) (Wales) Regulations 2003 (S.I. 2003 No. 1915 (W.209))
- Rheoliadau Diogelu'r Arfordir (Amrywio'r Dyfroedd a Eithrir) (Afon Teifi) (Cymru) 2003 (S.I. 2003 Rhif 1915 (Cy.209))
- The Disease Control (Wales) Order 2003 (S.I. 2003 No. 1966 (W.211))
- Gorchymyn Rheoli Clefydau (Cymru) 2003 (S.I. 2003 Rhif 1966 (Cy.211))
- The Animal Gatherings (Wales) Order 2003 (S.I. 2003 No. 1967 (W. 212))
- Gorchymyn Crynoadau Anifeiliaid (Cymru) 2003 (S.I. 2003 Rhif 1967 (Cy.212))
- The Transport of Animals (Cleansing and Disinfection) (Wales) (No. 3) Order 2003 (S.I. 2003 No. 1968 (W. 213))
- Gorchymyn Cludo Anifeiliaid (Glanhau a Diheintio) (Cymru) (Rhif 3) 2003 (S.I. 2003 Rhif 1968 (Cy.213))
- The National Health Service (General Dental Services) (Amendment)(No.2) (Wales) Regulations 2003 (S.I. 2003 No. 1976 (W.215))
- Rheoliadau'r Gwasanaeth Iechyd Gwladol (Gwasanaethau Deintyddol Cyffredinol) (Diwygio) (Rhif 2) (Cymru) 2003 (S.I. 2003 Rhif 1976 (Cy.215))
- The Food (Brazil Nuts) (Emergency Control) (Wales) Regulations 2003 (S.I. 2003 No. 2254 (W.224))
- Rheoliadau Bwyd (Cnau Brasil) (Rheolaeth Frys) (Cymru) 2003 (S.I. 2003 Rhif 2254 (Cy.224))
- The Food (Pistachios from Iran) (Emergency Control) (Wales) (No.2) Regulations 2003 (S.I. 2003 No. 2288 (W.227))
- Rheoliadau Bwyd (Cnau Pistasio o Iran) (Rheolaeth Frys) (Cymru) (Rhif 2) 2003 (S.I. 2003 Rhif 2288 (Cy.227))
- The Food (Figs, Hazelnuts and Pistachios from Turkey) (Emergency Control) (Wales) (Amendment) Regulations 2003 (S.I. 2003 No. 2292 (W.228))
- Rheoliadau Bwyd (Ffigys, Cnau Cyll a Chnau Pistasio o Dwrci) (Rheolaeth Frys) (Cymru) (Diwygio) 2003 (S.I. 2003 Rhif 2292 (Cy.228))
- The Food (Peanuts from China) (Emergency Control) (Amendment) (Wales) Regulations 2003 (S.I. 2003 No. 2299 (W.229))
- Rheoliadau Bwyd (Prysgnau o Tsieina) (Rheolaeth Frys) (Diwygio) (Cymru) 2003 (S.I. 2003 Rhif 2299 (Cy.229))
- The Education (Information About Post-16 Individual Pupils) (Wales) Regulations 2003 (S.I. 2003 No. 2453 (W.237))
- Rheoliadau Addysg (Gwybodaeth am Ddisgyblion Ôl-16 Unigol) (Cymru) 2003 (S.I. 2003 Rhif 2453 (Cy.237))
- The Food (Hot Chilli and Hot Chilli Products) (Emergency Control) (Wales) Regulations 2003 (S.I. 2003 No. 2455 (W.238))
- Rheoliadau Bwyd (Tsilis Poeth a Chynhyrchion Tsilis Poeth) (Rheolaeth Frys) (Cymru) 2003 (S.I. 2003 Rhif 2455 (Cy.238))
- The Classical Swine Fever (Wales) Order 2003 (S.I. 2003 No. 2456 (W.239))
- Gorchymyn Clwy Clasurol y Moch (Cymru) 2003 (S.I. 2003 Rhif 2456 (Cy.239))
- The Education (Teachers' Qualifications and Health Standards) (Amendment No. 2) (Wales) Regulations 2003 (S.I. 2003 No. 2458 (W.240))
- Rheoliadau Addysg (Cymwysterau Athrawon a Safonau Iechyd) (Diwygiad Rhif 2) (Cymru) 2003 (S.I. 2003 Rhif 2458 (Cy.240))
- The Nurses Agencies (Wales) Regulations 2003 (S.I. 2003 No. 2527 (W.242))
- Rheoliadau Asiantaethau Nyrsys (Cymru) 2003 (S.I. 2003 Rhif 2527 (Cy.242))
- The Care Standards Act 2000 (Commencement No.12) (Wales) Order 2003 (S.I. 2003 No. 2528 (W.243) (C.95))
- Gorchymyn Deddf Safonau Gofal 2000 (Cychwyn Rhif 12) (Cymru) 2003 (S.I. 2003 Rhif 2528 (Cy.243) (C.95))
- The Oil and Fibre Plant Seeds (Amendment) (Wales) Regulations 2003 (S.I. 2003 No. 2529 (W.244))
- Rheoliadau Hadau Planhigion Olew a Ffibr (Diwygio) (Cymru) 2003 (S.I. 2003 Rhif 2529 (Cy.244))
- The National Assistance (Assessment of Resources)(Amendment No. 2)(Wales) Regulations 2003 (S.I. 2003 No. 2530 (W.245))
- Rheoliadau Cymorth Gwladol (Asesu Adnoddau) (Diwygiad Rhif 2) (Cymru) 2003 (S.I. 2003 Rhif 2530 (Cy.245))
- The Disability Discrimination (Prescribed Periods for Accessibility Strategies and Plans for Schools) (Wales) Regulations 2003 (S.I. 2003 No. 2531 (W.246))
- Rheoliadau Gwahaniaethu ar Sail Anabledd (Cyfnodau Rhagnodedig ar gyfer Strategaethau a Chynlluniau Hygyrchedd ar gyfer Ysgolion) (Cymru) 2003 (S.I. 2003 Rhif 2531 (Cy.246))
- The Special Educational Needs and Disability Act 2001 (Commencement No. 2) (Wales) Order 2003 (S.I. 2003 No. 2532 (W.247) (C.94))
- Gorchymyn Deddf Anghenion Addysgol Arbennig ac Anabledd 2001 (Cychwyn Rhif 2) (Cymru) 2003 (S.I. 2003 Rhif 2532 (Cy.247) (C.94))
- The National Health Service (Travelling Expenses and Remission of Charges) (Amendment) (No.2) (Wales) Regulations 2003 (S.I. 2003 No. 2561 (W.250))
- Rheoliadau'r Gwasanaeth Iechyd Gwladol (Treuliau Teithio a Pheidio â Chodi Tâl) (Diwygio) (Rhif 2) (Cymru) 2003 (S.I. 2003 Rhif 2561 (Cy.250))
- The National Health Service (Amendments concerning Supplementary and Independent Nurse Prescribing) (Wales) Regulations 2003 (S.I. 2003 No. 2624 (W.252))
- Rheoliadau'r Gwasanaeth Iechyd Gwladol (Diwygiadau ynghylch Rhagnodi gan Nyrsys Atodol ac Annibynnol) (Cymru) 2003 (S.I. 2003 Rhif 2624 (Cy.252))
- The Health (Wales) Act 2003 (Commencement No. 1) Order 2003 (S.I. 2003 No. 2660 (W.256)(C.102))
- Gorchymyn Deddf Iechyd (Cymru) 2003 (Cychwyn Rhif 1) 2003 (S.I. 2003 Rhif 2660 (Cy.256)(C.102))
- The Food (Star Anise from Third Countries) (Emergency Control) (Wales) (Revocation) Order 2003 (S.I. 2003 No. 2661 (W.257))
- Gorchymyn Bwyd (Coed Anis o Drydydd Gwledydd) (Rheolaeth Frys) (Cymru) (Dirymu) 2003 (S.I. 2003 Rhif 2661 (Cy.257))
- The Local Authorities (Allowances for Members of County and County Borough Councils) (Past Service Awards) (Wales) Regulations 2003 (S.I. 2003 No. 2676 (W.258))
- Rheoliadau Awdurdodau Lleol (Lwfansau i Aelodau Cynghorau Sir a Chynghorau Bwrdeistref Sirol) (Dyfarndaliadau am Wasanaeth a Roddwyd) (Cymru) 2003 (S.I. 2003 Rhif 2676 (Cy.258))
- The Child Minding and Day Care (Amendment) (Wales) Regulations 2003 (S.I. 2003 No. 2708 (W.259))
- Rheoliadau Gwarchod Plant a Gofal Dydd (Diwygio) (Cymru) 2003 (S.I. 2003 Rhif 2708 (Cy.259))
- The Registration of Social Care and Independent Health Care (Amendment) (Wales) Regulations 2003 (S.I. 2003 No. 2709 (W.260))
- Rheoliadau Cofrestru Gofal Cymdeithasol a Gofal Iechyd Annibynnol (Diwygio) (Cymru) 2003 (S.I. 2003 Rhif 2709 (Cy.260))
- The Pig Industry Restructuring Grant (Wales) (Variation) Scheme 2003 (S.I. 2003 No. 2726 (W.261))
- Cynllun Grantiau Ailstrwythuro'r Diwydiant Moch (Cymru) (Amrywio) 2003 (S.I. 2003 Rhif 2726 (Cy.261))
- The Smoke Control Areas (Exempted Fireplaces) (Wales) Order 2003 (S.I. 2003 No. 2727 (W.262))
- Gorchymyn Ardaloedd Rheoli Mwg (Lleoedd Tân Esempt) (Cymru) 2003 (S.I. 2003 Rhif 2727 (Cy.262))
- The Animal By-Products (Identification) (Amendment) (Wales) (No. 2) Regulations 2003 (S.I. 2003 No. 2754 (W.265))
- Rheoliadau Sgil-gynhyrchion Anifeiliaid (Adnabod) (Diwygio) (Cymru) (Rhif 2) 2003 (S.I. 2003 Rhif 2754 (Cy.265))
- The Kava-kava in Food (Wales) (Revocation) Regulations 2003 (S.I. 2003 No. 2755 (W.266))
- Rheoliadau Cafa-cafa mewn Bwyd (Cymru) (Dirymu) 2003 (S.I. 2003 Rhif 2755 (Cy.266))
- The Animal By-Products (Wales) Regulations 2003 (S.I. 2003 No. 2756 (W.267))
- Rheoliadau Sgil-gynhyrchion Anifeiliaid (Cymru) 2003 (S.I. 2003 Rhif 2756 (Cy.267))
- The Pigs (Records, Identification and Movement) (Interim Measures) (Wales) (No.2) (Amendment) (No.2) Order 2003 (S.I. 2003 No. 2763 (W.268))
- Gorchymyn Moch (Cofnodion, Adnabod a Symud) (Mesurau Dros Dro) (Cymru) (Rhif 2) (Diwygio) (Rhif 2) 2003 (S.I. 2003 Rhif 2763 (Cy.268))
- The Schools Forums (Wales) Regulations 2003 (S.I. 2003 No. 2909 (W.275))
- Rheoliadau Fforymau Ysgolion (Cymru) 2003 (S.I. 2003 Rhif 2909 (Cy.275))
- The Food (Peanuts from Egypt) (Emergency Control) (Wales) Regulations 2003 (S.I. 2003 No. 2910 (W.276))
- Rheoliadau Bwyd (Pysgnau o'r Aifft) (Rheolaeth Frys) (Cymru) 2003 (S.I. 2003 Rhif 2910 (Cy.276))
- The Education Act 2002 (Transitional Provisions and Consequential Amendments) (No.2) (Wales) Regulations 2003 (S.I. 2003 No. 2959 (W.277))
- Rheoliadau Deddf Addysg 2002 (Darpariaethau Trosiannol a Diwygiadau Canlyniadol) (Rhif 2) (Cymru) 2003 (S.I. 2003 Rhif 2959 (Cy.277))
- The Education Act 2002 (Commencement No. 3) (Wales) Order 2003 (S.I. 2003 No. 2961 (W.278) (C.108))
- Gorchymyn Deddf Addysg 2002 (Cychwyn Rhif 3) (Cymru) 2003 (S.I. 2003 Rhif 2961 (Cy.278) (C.108))
- The Education (Admission Forums) (Wales) Regulations 2003 (S.I. 2003 No. 2962 (W.279))
- Rheoliadau Addysg (Fforymau Derbyn) (Cymru) 2003 (S.I. 2003 Rhif 2962 (Cy.279))
- The Local Authorities (Allowances for Members of County and County Borough Councils) (Pensions) (Wales) Regulations 2003 (S.I. 2003 No. 2963 (W.280))
- Rheoliadau Awdurdodau Lleol (Lwfansau i Aelodau Cynghorau Sir a Chynghorau Bwrdeistref Sirol) (Pensiynau) (Cymru) 2003 (S.I. 2003 Rhif 2963 (Cy.280))
- The Local Government Act 2003 (Commencement) (Wales) Order 2003 (S.I. 2003 No. 3034 (W.282) (C.113))
- Gorchymyn Deddf Llywodraeth Leol 2003 (Cychwyn) (Cymru) 2003 (S.I. 2003 Rhif 3034 (Cy.282) (C.113))
- The Shrimp Fishing Nets (Wales) Order 2003 (S.I. 2003 No. 3035 (W.283))
- Gorchymyn Rhwydi Pysgota Perdys (Cymru) 2003 (S.I. 2003 Rhif 3035 (Cy.283))
- The South Wales Sea Fisheries District (Variation) Order 2003 (S.I. 2003 No. 3036 (W.284))
- Gorchymyn Ardal Pysgodfeydd Môr De Cymru (Amrywio) 2003 (S.I. 2003 Rhif 3036 (Cy.284))
- The Cocoa and Chocolate Products (Wales) Regulations 2003 (S.I. 2003 No. 3037 (W.285))
- Rheoliadau Cynhyrchion Coco a Siocled (Cymru) 2003 (S.I. 2003 Rhif 3037 (Cy.285))
- The Fruit Juices and Fruit Nectars (Wales) Regulations 2003 (S.I. 2003 No. 3041 (W.286))
- Rheoliadau Suddoedd Ffrwythau a Neithdarau Ffrwythau (Cymru) 2003 (S.I. 2003 Rhif 3041 (Cy.286))
- The Natural Mineral Water, Spring Water and Bottled Drinking Water (Amendment) (Wales) Regulations 2003 (S.I. 2003 No. 3042 (W.287))
- Rheoliadau Dŵ r Mwynol Naturiol, Dŵ r Ffynnon a Dŵ r Yfed wedi'i Botelu (Diwygio) (Cymru) 2003 (S.I. 2003 Rhif 3042 (Cy.287))
- The Honey (Wales) Regulations 2003 (S.I. 2003 No. 3044 (W.288))
- Rheoliadau Mêl (Cymru) 2003 (S.I. 2003 Rhif 3044 (Cy.288))
- The Council Tax (Valuation Bands) (Wales) Order 2003 (S.I. 2003 No. 3046 (W.289))
- Gorchymyn y Dreth Gyngor (Bandiau Prisio) (Cymru) 2003 (S.I. 2003 Rhif 3046 (Cy.289))
- The Specified Sugar Products (Wales) Regulations 2003 (S.I. 2003 No. 3047 (W.290))
- Rheoliadau Cynhyrchion Siwgr Penodedig (Cymru) 2003 (S.I. 2003 Rhif 3047 (Cy.290))
- The Condensed Milk and Dried Milk (Wales) Regulations 2003 (S.I. 2003 No. 3053 (W.291))
- Rheoliadau Llaeth Cyddwys a Llaeth Sych (Cymru) 2003 (S.I. 2003 Rhif 3053 (Cy.291))
- The Nurses Agencies (Wales) (Amendment) Regulations 2003 (S.I. 2003 No. 3054 (W.292))
- Rheoliadau Asiantaethau Nyrsys (Cymru) (Diwygio) 2003 (S.I. 2003 Rhif 3054 (Cy.292))
- The Health (Wales) Act 2003 (Commencement No. 2) Order 2003 (S.I. 2003 No. 3064 (W.293)(C.115))
- Gorchymyn Deddf Iechyd (Cymru) 2003 (Cychwyn Rhif 2) 2003 (S.I. 2003 Rhif 3064 (Cy.293)(C.115))
- The South Wales Sea Fisheries Committee (Levies) Regulations 2003 (S.I. 2003 No. 3072 (W.294))
- Rheoliadau Pwyllgor Pysgodfeydd Môr De Cymru (Ardollau) 2003 (S.I. 2003 Rhif 3072 (Cy.294))
- The National Assembly for Wales (Returning Officers' Charges) (Amendment) Order 2003 (S.I. 2003 No. 3117 (W.295))
- Gorchymyn Cynulliad Cenedlaethol Cymru (Taliadau Swyddogion Canlyniadau) (Diwygio) 2003 (S.I. 2003 Rhif 3117 (Cy.295))
- The LEA Budget, Schools Budget and Individual Schools Budget (Wales) Regulations 2003 (S.I. 2003 No. 3118 (W.296))
- Rheoliadau Cyllidebau AALl, Cyllidebau Ysgolion a Chyllidebau Ysgolion Unigol (Cymru) 2003 (S.I. 2003 Rhif 3118 (Cy.296))
- The Feeding Stuffs, the Feeding Stuffs (Sampling and Analysis) and the Feeding Stuffs (Enforcement) (Amendment) (Wales) (No.2) Regulations 2003 (S.I. 2003 No. 3119 (W.297))
- Rheoliadau Porthiant, Porthiant (Samplu a Dadansoddi) a Phorthiant (Gorfodi) (Diwygio) (Cymru) (Rhif 2) 2003 (S.I. 2003 Rhif 3119 (Cy.297))
- The Education (Recognised Bodies) (Wales) Order 2003 (S.I. 2003 No. 3124 (W.298))
- Gorchymyn Addysg (Cyrff sy'n Cael eu Cydnabod) (Cymru) 2003 (S.I. 2003 Rhif 3124 (Cy.298))
- The Powys (Llanbadarn Fynydd, Llanbister and Abbey Cwmhir) Order 2003 (S.I. 2003 No. 3132 (W.299))
- Gorchymyn Powys (Llanbadarn Fynydd, Llanbister ac Abaty Cwm-hir) 2003 (S.I. 2003 Rhif 3132 (Cy.299))
- The Denbighshire (Rhuddlan, Rhyl, Dyserth and Prestatyn) Order 2003 (S.I. 2003 No. 3134 (W.300))
- Gorchymyn Sir Ddinbych (Rhuddlan, y Rhyl, Dyserth a Phrestatyn) 2003 (S.I. 2003 Rhif 3134 (Cy.300))

== 301-400 ==
- The Cardiff (Llandaff North, Whitchurch, Llanishen, Lisvane, Ely and St. Fagans Communities) Order 2003 (S.I. 2003 No. 3137 (W.301))
- Gorchymyn Caerdydd (Cymunedau Ystum Taf, yr Eglwys Newydd, Llanisien, Llys-Faen, Trelái a Sain Ffagan) 2003 (S.I. 2003 Rhif 3137 (Cy.301))
- The Non-Domestic Rating Contributions (Wales) (Amendment) Regulations 2003 (S.I. 2003 No. 3211 (W.304))
- Rheoliadau Cyfraniadau Ardrethu Annomestig (Cymru) (Diwygio) 2003 (S.I. 2003 Rhif 3211 (Cy.304))
- The Adoption Agencies (Amendment) (Wales) Regulations 2003 (S.I. 2003 No. 3223 (W.306))
- Rheoliadau Asiantaethau Mabwysiadu (Diwygio) (Cymru) 2003 (S.I. 2003 Rhif 3223 (Cy.306))
- The Central Rating List (Wales) (Amendment) Regulations 2003 (S.I. 2003 No. 3225 (W.307))
- Rheoliadau Rhestr Ardrethu Canolog (Cymru) (Diwygio) 2003 (S.I. 2003 Rhif 3225 (Cy.307))
- The Education (Pupil Exclusions and Appeals) (Maintained Schools) (Wales) Regulations 2003 (S.I. 2003 No. 3227 (W.308))
- Rheoliadau Addysg (Gwahardd Disgyblion ac Apelau) (Ysgolion a Gynhelir) (Cymru) 2003 (S.I. 2003 Rhif 3227 (Cy.308))
- The Collagen and Gelatine (Intra-Community Trade) (Wales) Regulations 2003 (S.I. 2003 No. 3229 (W.309))
- Rheoliadau Colagen a Gelatin (Masnach o fewn y Gymuned) (Cymru) 2003 (S.I. 2003 Rhif 3229 (Cy.309))
- The Independent Schools (Provision of Information) (Wales) Regulations 2003 (S.I. 2003 No. 3230 (W.310))
- Rheoliadau Ysgolion Annibynnol (Darparu Gwybodaeth) (Cymru) 2003 (S.I. 2003 Rhif 3230 (Cy.310))
- The Education (School Day and School Year) (Wales) Regulations 2003 (S.I. 2003 No. 3231 (W.311))
- Rheoliadau Addysg (Y Diwrnod Ysgol a'r Flwyddyn Ysgol) (Cymru) 2003 (S.I. 2003 Rhif 3231 (Cy.311))
- The Independent Schools (Publication of Inspection Reports) (Wales) Regulations 2003 (S.I. 2003 No. 3232 (W.312))
- Rheoliadau Ysgolion Annibynnol (Cyhoeddi Adroddiadau Arolygu) (Cymru) 2003 (S.I. 2003 Rhif 3232 (Cy.312))
- The Independent Schools (Religious Character of Schools) (Designation Procedure) (Wales) Regulations 2003 (S.I. 2003 No. 3233 (W.313))
- Rheoliadau Ysgolion Annibynnol (Cymeriad Crefyddol Ysgolion) (Gweithdrefn Ddynodi) (Cymru) 2003 (S.I. 2003 Rhif 3233 (Cy.313))
- The Independent School Standards (Wales) Regulations 2003 (S.I. 2003 No. 3234 (W.314))
- Rheoliadau Safonau Ysgol Annibynnol (Cymru) 2003 (S.I. 2003 Rhif 3234 (Cy.314))
- The Wildlife and Countryside (Registration, Ringing and Marking of Certain Captive Birds) (Wales) Regulations 2003 (S.I. 2003 No. 3235 (W.315))
- Rheoliadau Bywyd Gwyllt a Chefn Gwlad (Cofrestru, Modrwyo a Marcio Adar Caeth Penodol) (Cymru) 2003 (S.I. 2003 Rhif 3235 (Cy.315))
- The National Health Service (Pharmaceutical Services) (Amendment) (No.2) (Wales) Regulations 2003 (S.I. 2003 No. 3236 (W.316))
- Rheoliadau'r Gwasanaeth Iechyd Gwladol (Gwasanaethau Fferyllol) (Diwygio) (Rhif 2) (Cymru) 2003 (S.I. 2003 Rhif 3236 (Cy.316))
- The Education (Information About Individual Pupils) (Wales) Regulations 2003 (S.I. 2003 No. 3237 (W.317))
- Rheoliadau Addysg (Gwybodaeth am Ddisgyblion Unigol) (Cymru) 2003 (S.I. 2003 Rhif 3237 (Cy.317))
- The Producer Responsibility Obligations (Packaging Waste) (Amendment) (Wales) Regulations 2003 (S.I. 2003 No. 3238 (W.318))
- Rheoliadau Rhwymedigaethau Cyfrifoldeb Cynhyrchwyr (Gwastraff Deunydd Pacio) (Diwygio) (Cymru) 2003 (S.I. 2003 Rhif 3238 (Cy.318))
- The Local Authorities (Capital Finance and Accounting) (Wales) Regulations 2003 (S.I. 2003 No. 3239 (W.319))
- The Education (Pupil Exclusions and Appeals) (Pupil Referral Units) (Wales) Regulations 2003 (S.I. 2003 No. 3246 (W.321))
- Rheoliadau Addysg (Gwahardd Disgyblion ac Apelau) (Unedau Cyfeirio Disgyblion) (Cymru) 2003 (S.I. 2003 Rhif 3246 (Cy.321))
- The African Swine Fever (Wales) Order 2003 (S.I. 2003 No. 3273 (W.323))
- Gorchymyn Clwy Affricanaidd y Moch (Cymru) 2003 (S.I. 2003 Rhif 3273 (Cy.323))
