= List of Welsh statutory instruments, 2009 =

This is a list of Welsh statutory instruments made in 2009. Statutory instruments made by the Assembly are numbered in the main United Kingdom series with their own sub-series. The Welsh language has official equal status with the English language in Wales, so every statutory instrument made by the Assembly is officially published in both English and Welsh. The statutory instruments are secondary legislation, deriving their power from the acts of Parliament establishing and transferring functions and powers to the Welsh Assembly.

== 1-100 ==
- Gorchymyn Llywodraeth Leol (Cynorthwywyr i Grwpiau Gwleidyddol) (Tâl) (Cymru) 2009 (WSI 2009 No. 40 (Cy. 12))
- The Local Government (Assistants for Political Groups) (Remuneration) (Wales) Order 2009 (WSI 2009 No. 40 (W. 12))
- Rheoliadau S_n Amgylcheddol (Cymru) (Diwygio) 2009 (WSI 2009 No. 47 (Cy. 15))
- The Environmental Noise (Wales) (Amendment) Regulations 2009 (WSI 2009 No. 47 (W. 15))
- Rheoliadau Addysg (Ysgolion Arbennig a Gynhelir) (Cymru) (Diwygio) 2009 (WSI 2009 No. 48 (Cy. 16))
- The Education (Maintained Special Schools) (Wales) (Amendment) Regulations 2009 (WSI 2009 No. 48 (W. 16))
- Gorchymyn Deddf Addysg ac Arolygiadau 2006 (Cychwyn Rhif 2) (Cymru) 2009 (WSI 2009 No. 49 (C. 5) (Cy. 17))
- The Education and Inspections Act 2006 (Commencement No. 2) (Wales) Order 2009 (WSI 2009 No. 49 (C. 5) (W. 17))
- Rheoliadau'r Gwasanaeth Iechyd Gwladol (Treuliau Teithio a Pheidio â Chodi Tâl) (Cymru) (Diwygio) 2009 (WSI 2009 No. 54 (Cy. 18))
- The National Health Service (Travelling Expenses and Remission of Charges) (Wales) (Amendment) Regulations 2009 (WSI 2009 No. 54 (W. 18))
- Gorchymyn Awdurdodau Lleol (Ffioedd Chwiliadau Eiddo) (Datgymhwyso) (Cymru) 2009 (WSI 2009 No. 55 (Cy. 19))
- The Local Authorities (Charges for Property Searches) (Disapplication) Wales) Order 2009 (WSI 2009 No. 55 (W. 19))
- Rheoliadau Bwydydd Anifeiliaid (Cymru) (Diwygio) 2009 (WSI 2009 No. 106 (Cy. 20))
- The Feeding Stuffs (Wales) (Amendment) Regulations 2009 (WSI 2009 No. 106 (W. 20))
- Rheoliadau Llaeth Ysgol (Cymru) (Diwygio) 2009 (WSI 2009 No. 108 (Cy. 21))
- The School Milk (Wales) (Amendment) Regulations 2009 (WSI 2009 No. 108 (W. 21))
- Gorchymyn Cynllunio Trafnidiaeth Rhanbarthol (Cymru) (Diwygio) 2009 (WSI 2009 No. 109 (Cy. 22))
- The Regional Transport Planning (Wales) (Amendment) Order 2009 (WSI 2009 No. 109 (W. 22))
- Rheoliadau Enseffalopathau Sbyngffurf Trosglwyddadwy (Cymru) (Diwygio) 2009 (WSI 2009 No. 192 (Cy. 24))
- The Transmissible Spongiform Encephalopathies (Wales)(Amendment) Regulations 2009 (WSI 2009 No. 192 (W. 24))
- Gorchymyn Ymddiriedolaeth Gwasanaeth Iechyd Gwladol Gwasanaethau Ambiwlans Cymru (Sefydlu) (Diwygio) 2009 (WSI 2009 No. 201 (Cy. 26))
- The Welsh Ambulance Services National Health Service Trust (Establishment) (Amendment) Order 2009 (WSI 2009 No. 201 (W. 26))
- Rheoliadau Ardrethu Annomestig (Eiddo Heb ei Feddiannu) (Cymru) (Diwygio) 2009 (WSI 2009 No. 255 (Cy. 27))
- The Non-Domestic Rating (Unoccupied Property) (Wales) (Amendment) Regulations 2009 (WSI 2009 No. 255 (W. 27))
- Rheoliadau Galluedd Meddyliol (Amddifadu o Ryddid: Penodi Cynrychiolydd Person Perthnasol) (Cymru) 2009 (WSI 2009 No. 266 (Cy. 29))
- The Mental Capacity (Deprivation of Liberty: Appointment of Relevant Person's Representative) (Wales) Regulations 2009 (WSI 2009 No. 266 (W. 29))
- Rheoliadau Awdurdodau Lleol (Addasu Cyfrifiadau Angenrheidiol) (Cymru) 2009 (WSI 2009 No. 267 (Cy. 30))
- The Local Authorities (Alteration of Requisite Calculations) (Wales) Regulations 2009 (WSI 2009 No. 267 (W. 30))
- Rheoliadau'r Gwasanaeth Iechyd Gwladol (Ffioedd a Thaliadau Optegol) (Diwygio) (Cymru) 2009 (WSI 2009 No. 311 (Cy. 33))
- The National Health Service (Optical Charges and Payments) (Amendment) (Wales) Regulations 2009 (WSI 2009 No. 311 (W. 33))
- Rheoliadau Cronfa Pysgodfeydd Ewrop (Grantiau) (Cymru) 2009 (WSI 2009 No. 360 (Cy. 35))
- The European Fisheries Fund (Grants) (Wales) Regulations 2009 (WSI 2009 No. 360 (W. 35))
- Gorchymyn Sir Ynys Môn (Cymunedau Caergybi, Trearddur, Cwm Cadnant, Penmynydd, Pentraeth a Llanfair Mathafarn Eithaf) 2009 (WSI 2009 No. 367 (Cy 37))
- The County of the Isle of Anglesey (Holyhead, Trearddur, Cwm Cadnant, Penmynydd, Pentraeth and Llanfair-Mathafarn-Eithaf Communities) Order 2009 (WSI 2009 No. 367 (W. 37))
- Rheoliadau Awdurdodau Lleol (Ffioedd Chwiliadau Eiddo) (Cymru) 2009 (WSI 2009 No. 369 (Cy. 38))
- The Local Authorities (Charges for Property Searches)(Wales) Regulations 2009 (WSI 2009 No. 369 (W. 38))
- Gorchymyn Mesur Teithio gan Ddysgwyr (Cymru) 2008 (Cychwyn Rhif 1) 2009 (WSI 2009 No. 371 (C. 45) (Cy. 39))
- The Learner Travel (Wales) Measure 2008 (Commencement No. 1) Order 2009 (WSI 2009 No. 371 (C. 45) (W. 39))
- Rheoliadau Anifeiliaid a Chynhyrchion Anifeiliaid (Mewnforio ac Allforio) (Cymru) (Diwygio) 2009 (WSI 2009 No. 390 (Cy. 40))
- The Animals and Animal Products (Import and Export) (Wales) (Amendment) Regulations 2009 (WSI 2009 No. 390 (W. 40))
- Rheoliadau Cynhyrchion sy'n Dod o Anifeiliaid (Mewnforion Trydydd Gwledydd) (Cymru) (Diwygio) 2009 (WSI 2009 No. 392 (Cy. 41))
- The Products of Animal Origin (Third Country Imports) (Wales) (Amendment) Regulations 2009 (WSI 2009 No. 392 (W. 41))
- Rheoliadau Dyrannu Tai a Digartrefedd (Cymhwystra) (Cymru) 2009 (WSI 2009 No. 393 (Cy. 42))
- The Allocation of Housing and Homelessness (Eligibility) (Wales) Regulations 2009 (WSI 2009 No. 393 (W. 42))
- Rheoliadau Iechyd Planhigion (Ffioedd Arolygu Mewnforio) (Cymru) (Diwygio) 2009 (WSI 2009 No. 398 (Cy. 43))
- The Plant Health (Import Inspection Fees) (Wales) (Amendment) Regulations 2009 (WSI 2009 No. 398 (W. 43))
- Gorchymyn Rheoli Salmonela mewn Heidiau o Frwyliaid (Cymru) 2009 (WSI 2009 No. 441 (Cy. 46))
- The Control of Salmonella in Broiler Flocks (Wales) Order 2009 (WSI 2009 No. 441 (W. 46))
- Rheoliadau'r Gwasanaeth Iechyd Gwladol (Ffioedd Deintyddol, Contractau Gwasanaethau Deintyddol Cyffredinol a Chytundebau Gwasanaethau Deintyddol Personol) (Cymru) (Diwygio) 2009 (WSI 2009 No. 456 (Cy. 47))
- The National Health Service (Dental Charges, General Dental Services Contracts and Personal Dental Services Agreements) (Wales) (Amendment) Regulations 2009 (WSI 2009 No. 456 (W. 47))
- Rheoliadau Ardrethu Annomestig (Casglu a Gorfodi) (Rhestri Lleol) (Diwygio) (Cymru) 2009 (WSI 2009 No. 461 (Cy. 48))
- The Non-Domestic Rating (Collection and Enforcement) (Local Lists) (Amendment) (Wales) Regulations 2009 (WSI 2009 No. 461 (W. 48))
- The Plastic Materials and Articles in Contact with Food (Wales) Regulations 2009 (WSI 2009 No. 481 (W. 49))
- Rheoliadau Awdurdodau Lleol (Cyllid Cyfalaf a Chyfrifyddu) (Cymru) (Diwygio) 2009 (WSI 2009 No. 560 (Cy. 52))
- The Local Authorities (Capital Finance and Accounting) (Wales) (Amendment) Regulations 2009 (WSI 2009 No. 560 (W. 52))
- Rheoliadau Gwybodaeth am Deithio gan Ddysgwyr (Cymru) 2009 (WSI 2009 No. 569 (Cy. 53))
- The Learner Travel Information (Wales) Regulations 2009 (WSI 2009 No. 569 (W. 53))
- Rheoliadau Newid Amserau Sesiynau Ysgolion (Cymru) 2009 (WSI 2009 No. 572 (Cy. 54))
- The Changing of School Session Times (Wales) Regulations 2009 (WSI 2009 No. 572 (W. 54))
- Gorchymyn Deddf Trafnidiaeth Leol 2008 (Cychwyn Rhif 1 a Darpariaethau Trosiannol) (Cymru) 2009 (WSI 2009 No. 579 (Cy. 55) (C. 50))
- The Local Transport Act 2008 (Commencement No. 1 and Transitional Provisions) (Wales) Order 2009 (WSI 2009 No. 579 (W. 55) (C. 50))
- Rheoliadau'r Gwasanaeth Iechyd Gwladol (Diwygiadau sy'n ymwneud â Ffioedd a Thaliadau Optegol) (Cymru) 2009 (WSI 2009 No. 589 (Cy. 56))
- The National Health Service (Amendments relating to Optical Charges and Payments) (Wales) Regulations 2009 (WSI 2009 No. 589 (W. 56))
- Gorchymyn Deddf Iechyd a Gofal Cymdeithasol 2008 (Cychwyn Rhif 1) (Cymru) 2009 (WSI 2009 No. 631 (Cy. 57) (C. 43))
- The Health and Social Care Act 2008 (Commencement No. 1) (Wales) Order 2009 (WSI 2009 No. 631 (W. 57) (C. 43))
- Rheoliadau Cymorth Gwladol (Asesu Adnoddau a Symiau at Anghenion Personol) (Diwygio) (Cymru) 2009 (WSI 2009 No. 632 (Cy. 58))
- The National Assistance (Assessment of Resources and Sums for Personal Requirements) (Amendment) (Wales) Regulations 2009 (WSI 2009 No. 632 (W. 58))
- Gorchymyn Addysg (Cyrff sy'n Cael eu Cydnabod)(Cymru) 2009 (WSI 2009 No. 667 (Cy. 59))
- The Education (Recognised Bodies) (Wales) (Amendment) Order 2009 (WSI 2009 No. 667 (W. 59))
- Rheoliadau'r Gwasanaeth Iechyd Gwladol (Treuliau Teithio a Pheidio â Chodi Tâl) (Cymru) (Diwygio) (Rhif 2) 2009 (WSI 2009 No. 709 (Cy. 61))
- The National Health Service (Travelling Expenses and Remission of Charges) (Wales) (Amendment) (No.2) Regulations 2009 (WSI 2009 No. 709 (W. 61))
- Gorchymyn Addysg (Cyrff sy'n Cael eu Rhestru) (Cymru) (Diwygio) 2009 (WSI 2009 No. 710 (Cy. 62))
- The Education (Listed Bodies) (Wales) (Amendment) Order 2009 (WSI 2009 No. 710 (W. 62))
- Gorchymyn Deddf Plant a Phobl Ifanc 2008 (Cychwyn Rhif 1) (Cymru) 2009 (WSI 2009 No. 728 (Cy. 64) (C. 47))
- The Children and Young Persons Act 2008 (Commencement No. 1) (Wales) Order 2009 (WSI 2009 No. 728 (W. 64) (C. 47))
- Gorchymyn Deddf Tai ac Adfywio 2008 (Cychwyn Rhif 1) (Cymru) 2009 (WSI 2009 No. 773 (C. 48) (Cy. 65))
- The Housing and Regeneration Act 2008 (Commencement No. 1) (Wales) Order 2009 (WSI 2009 No. 773 (C. 48) (W. 65))
- Gorchymyn Byrddau Iechyd Lleol (Sefydlu a Diddymu) (Cymru) 2009 (WSI 2009 No. 778 (Cy. 66))
- The Local Health Boards (Establishment and Dissolution) (Wales) Order 2009 (WSI 2009 No. 778 (W. 66))
- Rheoliadau Byrddau Iechyd Lleol (Cyfansoddiad, Aelodaeth a Gweithdrefnau) (Cymru) 2009 (WSI 2009 No. 779 (Cy. 67))
- The Local Health Boards (Constitution, Membership and Procedures) (Wales) Regulations 2009 (WSI 2009 No. 779 (W. 67))
- Gorchymyn Deddf Bywyd Gwyllt a Chefn Gwlad 1981 (Amrywio Atodlen 4) (Cymru) 2009 (WSI 2009 No. 780 (Cy. 68))
- The Wildlife and Countryside Act 1981 (Variation of Schedule 4) (Wales) Order 2009 (WSI 2009 No. 780 (W. 68))
- Rheoliadau Galluedd Meddyliol (Amddifadu o Ryddid: Asesiadau, Awdurdodiadau Safonol ac Anghydfodau ynghylch Preswyliaeth) (Cymru) 2009 (WSI 2009 No. 783 (Cy. 69))
- The Mental Capacity (Deprivation of Liberty: Assessments, Standard Authorisations and Disputes about Residence) (Wales) Regulations 2009 (WSI 2009 No. 783 (W. 69))
- Gorchymyn Deddf Addysg a Sgiliau 2008 (Cychwyn Rhif 1 ac Arbedion) (Cymru) 2009 (WSI 2009 No. 784 (C. 51) (Cy. 70))
- The Education and Skills Act 2008 (Commencement No. 1 and Savings) (Wales) Order 2009 (WSI 2009 No. 784 (C. 51) (W. 70))
- Rheoliadau Wyau a Chywion (Cymru) 2009 (WSI 2009 No. 793 (Cy. 71))
- The Eggs and Chicks (Wales) Regulations 2009 (WSI 2009 No. 793 (W. 71))
- Rheoliadau Addysg (Derbyn Plant sy'n Derbyn Gofal) (Cymru) 2009 (WSI 2009 No. 821 (Cy. 72))
- The Education (Admission of Looked After Children) (Wales) Regulations 2009 (WSI 2009 No. 821 (W. 72))
- Rheoliadau Addysg (Trefniadau Apelau Derbyn) (Cymru) (Diwygio) 2009 (WSI 2009 No. 823 (Cy. 73))
- The Education (Admission Appeals Arrangements) (Wales) (Amendment) Regulations 2009 (WSI 2009 No. 823 (W. 73))
- Rheoliadau Lwfansau Cynhaliaeth Addysg (Cymru) (Dirymu) 2009 (WSI 2009 No. 825 (Cy. 74))
- The Education Maintenance Allowances (Wales) (Revocation) Regulations 2009 (WSI 2009 No. 825 (W. 74))
- Rheoliadau Addysg (Maint Dosbarthiadau Babanod) (Cymru) (Diwygio) 2009 (WSI 2009 No. 828 (Cy. 75))
- The Education (Infant Class Sizes) (Wales) (Amendment) Regulations 2009 (WSI 2009 No. 828 (W. 75))
- Rheoliadau Cynllunio Gwlad a Thref (Ffioedd am Geisiadau a Cheisiadau Tybiedig) (Diwygio) (Cymru) 2009 (WSI 2009 No. 851 (Cy. 76))
- The Town and Country Planning (Fees for Applications and Deemed Applications) (Amendment) (Wales) Regulations 2009 (WSI 2009 No. 851 (W. 76))
- Gorchymyn Merthyr Tudful a Phowys (Ardaloedd) 2009 (WSI 2009 No. 889 (Cy. 78))
- The Merthyr Tydfil and Powys (Areas) Order 2009 (WSI 2009 No. 889 (W. 78))
- Rheoliadau Difrod Amgylcheddol (Atal ac Adfer) (Cymru) 2009 (WSI 2009 No. 995 (Cy. 81))
- The Environmental Damage (Prevention and Remediation) (Wales) Regulations 2009 (WSI 2009 No. 995 (W. 81))
- Gorchymyn Cynllunio Gwlad a Thref (Gweithdrefn Datblygu Cyffredinol) (Diwygio) (Cymru) 2009 (WSI 2009 No. 1024 (Cy. 87))
- The Town and Country Planning (General Development Procedure) (Amendment) (Wales) Order 2009 (WSI 2009 No. 1024 (W. 87))
- Rheoliadau Cynllunio (Adeiladau Rhestredig ac Ardaloedd Cadwraeth) (Diwygio) (Cymru) 2009 (WSI 2009 No. 1026 (Cy. 88))
- The Planning (Listed Buildings and Conservation Areas) (Amendment) (Wales) Regulations 2009 (WSI 2009 No. 1026 (W. 88))
- Gorchymyn Deddf Addysg ac Arolygiadau 2006 (Cychwyn Rhif 3) (Cymru) 2009 (WSI 2009 No. 1027 (Cy. 89) (C. 60))
- The Education and Inspections Act 2006 (Commencement No. 3) (Wales) Order 2009 (WSI 2009 No. 1027 (W. 89) (C. 60))
- Gorchymyn Ymddiriedolaethau Gwasanaeth Iechyd Gwladol (Cyfalaf Cychwynnol) (Cymru) 2009 (WSI 2009 No. 1035 (Cy. 90))
- The National Health Service Trusts (Originating Capital) (Wales) Order 2009 (WSI 2009 No. 1035 (W. 90))
- Rheoliadau Grantiau Adnewyddu Tai (Diwygio) (Cymru) 2009 (WSI 2009 No. 1087 (Cy. 95))
- The Housing Renewal Grants (Amendment) (Wales) Regulations 2009 (WSI 2009 No. 1087 (W. 95))
- Rheoliadau Cynhyrchion Sy'n Dod o Anifeiliaid (Mewnforion Trydydd Gwledydd) (Cymru) (Diwygio) (Rhif 2) 2009 (WSI 2009 No. 1088 (Cy. 96))
- The Products of Animal Origin (Third Country Imports) (Wales) (Amendment) (No. 2) Regulations 2009 (WSI 2009 No. 1088 (W. 96))
- Y Rheoliadau Meini Prawf Purdeb ar gyfer Lliwiau, Melysyddion ac Ychwanegion Bwyd Amrywiol (Cymru) 2009 (WSI 2009 No. 1092 (Cy. 97))
- The Purity Criteria for Colours, Sweeteners and Miscellaneous Food Additives (Wales) Regulations 2009 (WSI 2009 No. 1092 (W. 97))
- Gorchymyn Deddf Rheoli Traffig 2004 (Cychwyn Rhif 3) (Cymru) 2009 (WSI 2009 No. 1095 (Cy. 98) (C. 63))
- The Traffic Management Act 2004 (Commencement No. 3) (Wales) Order 2009 (WSI 2009 No. 1095 (W. 98) (C. 63))

== 101-200 ==
- Rheoliadau'r Gwasanaeth Iechyd Gwladol (Ffioedd) (Diwygiadau Ynghylch Ffliw Pandemig) (Cymru) 2009 (WSI 2009 No. 1175 (Cy. 102))
- The National Health Service (Charges) (Amendments Relating to Pandemic Influenza) (Wales) Regulations 2009 (WSI 2009 No. 1175 (W. 102))
- Gorchymyn Dynodi Ysgolion Sydd â Chymeriad Crefyddol (Ysgolion Annibynnol) (Cymru) 2009 (WSI 2009 No. 1218 (Cy. 103))
- The Designation of Schools Having a Religious Character (Independent Schools) (Wales) Order 2009 (WSI 2009 No. 1218 (W. 103))
- Gorchymyn Swyddogaethau mewn perthynas â Chymwysterau Allanol (Cymru) 2009 (WSI 2009 No. 1220 (Cy. 104))
- The Functions in relation to External Qualifications (Wales) Order 2009 (WSI 2009 No. 1220 (W. 104))
- Gorchymyn Cynllun Pensiwn y Diffoddwyr Tân (Cymru) (Diwygio) 2009 (WSI 2009 No. 1225 (Cy. 108))
- The Firefighters' Pension Scheme (Wales) (Amendment) Order 2009 (WSI 2009 No. 1225 (W. 108))
- Gorchymyn Cynllun Pensiwn y Dynion Tân (Cymru) (Diwygio) 2009 (WSI 2009 No. 1226 (Cy. 109))
- The Firefighters' Pension (Wales) Scheme (Amendment) Order 2009 (WSI 2009 No. 1226 (W. 109))
- Gorchymyn Tai (Rhoi Tenantiaethau yn lle Tenantiaethau a Derfynwyd) (Olynydd-landlordiaid) (Cymru) 2009 (WSI 2009 No. 1260 (Cy. 112))
- The Housing (Replacement of Terminated Tenancies) (Successor Landlords) (Wales) Order 2009 (WSI 2009 No. 1260 (W. 112))
- Rheoliadau Cynlluniau Trwyddedau Rheoli Traffig (Cymru) 2009 (WSI 2009 No. 1267 (Cy. 114))
- The Traffic Management Permit Scheme (Wales) Regulations 2009 (WSI 2009 No. 1267 (W. 114))
- Rheoliadau Gwaith Stryd (Taliadau am Feddiannaeth a Ymestynnir yn Afresymol ar y Briffordd) (Cymru) 2009 (WSI 2009 No. 1268 (Cy. 115))
- The Street Works (Charges for Unreasonably Prolonged Occupation of the Highway) (Wales) Regulations 2009 (WSI 2009 No. 1268 (W. 115))
- Gorchymyn Ymddiriedolaethau'r Gwasanaeth Iechyd Gwladol (Diddymu) (Cymru) 2009 (WSI 2009 No. 1306 (Cy. 117))
- The National Health Service Trusts (Dissolution) (Wales) Order 2009 (WSI 2009 No. 1306 (W. 117))
- Rheoliadau Addysg (Ardaloedd y Perthyn Disgyblion a Myfyrwyr iddynt) (Diwygio) (Cymru) 2009 (WSI 2009 No. 1338 (Cy. 123))
- The Education (Areas to which Pupils and Students Belong) (Amendment) (Wales) Regulations 2009 (WSI 2009 No. 1338 (W. 123))
- Rheoliadau Addysg (Cyflwyno Gwybodaeth) (Cymru) 2009 (WSI 2009 No. 1350 (Cy. 126))
- The Education (Supply of Information) (Wales) Regulations 2009 (WSI 2009 No. 1350 (W. 126))
- Gorchymyn Cyngor Addysgu Cyffredinol Cymru (Swyddogaethau Ychwanegol) (Diwygio) 2009 (WSI 2009 No. 1351 (Cy. 127))
- The General Teaching Council for Wales (Additional Functions) (Amendment) Order 2009 (WSI 2009 No. 1351 (W. 127))
- Rheoliadau Cyngor Addysgu Cyffredinol Cymru (Cyfansoddiad) (Diwygio) 2009 (WSI 2009 No. 1352 (Cy. 128))
- The General Teaching Council for Wales (Constitution) (Amendment) Regulations 2009 (WSI 2009 No. 1352 (W. 128))
- Rheoliadau Cyngor Addysgu Cyffredinol Cymru (Swyddogaethau) (Diwygio) 2009 (WSI 2009 No. 1353 (Cy. 129))
- The General Teaching Council for Wales (Functions) (Amendment) Regulations 2009 (WSI 2009 No. 1353 (W. 129))
- Rheoliadau Cyngor Addysgu Cyffredinol Cymru (Swyddogaethau Disgyblu) (Diwygio) 2009 (WSI 2009 No. 1354 (Cy. 130))
- The General Teaching Council for Wales (Disciplinary Functions) (Amendment) Regulations 2009 (WSI 2009 No. 1354 (W. 130))
- Rheoliadau Hadau (Diwygiadau Amrywogaethau Cadwraeth) (Cymru) 2009 (WSI 2009 No. 1356 (Cy. 131))
- The Seed (Conservation Varieties Amendments) (Wales) Regulations 2009 (WSI 2009 No. 1356 (W. 131))
- Rheoliadau Clefyd Pothellog y Moch (Cymru) 2009 (WSI 2009 No. 1372 (Cy. 135))
- The Swine Vesicular Disease (Wales) Regulations 2009 (WSI 2009 No. 1372 (W. 135))
- Rheoliadau Cynhyrchion sy'n Dod o Anifeiliaid (Rheoli Clefydau) (Cymru) (Diwygio) 2009 (WSI 2009 No. 1373 (Cy. 136))
- The Products of Animal Origin (Disease Control) (Wales) (Amendment) Regulations 2009 (WSI 2009 No. 1373 (W. 136))
- Gorchymyn Iechyd Planhigion (Cymru) (Diwygio) 2009 (WSI 2009 No. 1376 (Cy. 137))
- The Plant Health (Wales) (Amendment) Order 2009 (WSI 2009 No. 1376 (W. 137))
- Gorchymyn Ymddiriedolaethau Gwasanaeth Iechyd Gwladol (Cyfalaf Cychwynnol) (Cymru) (Diwygio) 2009 (WSI 2009 No. 1382 (Cy. 138))
- The National Health Service Trusts (Originating Capital) (Wales) (Amendment) Order 2009 (WSI 2009 No. 1382 (W. 138))
- Rheoliadau Ymddiriedolaeth Gwasanaeth Iechyd Gwladol Iechyd Cyhoeddus Cymru (Aelodaeth a Gweithdrefn) 2009 (WSI 2009 No. 1385 (Cy. 141))
- The Public Health Wales National Health Service Trust (Membership and Procedure) Regulations 2009 (WSI 2009 No. 1385 (W. 141))
- Rheoliadau Halogion mewn Bwyd (Cymru) 2009 (WSI 2009 No. 1386 (Cy. 142))
- The Contaminants in Food (Wales) Regulations 2009 (WSI 2009 No. 1386 (W. 142))
- Rheoliadau'r Gwasanaeth Iechyd Gwladol (Gwasanaethau Fferyllol) (Diwygio) (Cymru) 2009 (WSI 2009 No. 1491 (Cy. 144))
- The National Health Service (Pharmaceutical Services) (Amendment) (Wales) Regulation 2009 (WSI 2009 No. 1491 (W. 144))
- Rheoliadau Addysg (Trefniadau Apelau Derbyn) (Cymru) (Diwygio Rhif 2) 2009 (WSI 2009 No. 1500 (Cy. 145))
- The Education (Admission Appeals Arrangements) (Wales) (Amendment No. 2) Regulations 2009 (WSI 2009 No. 1500 (W. 145))
- Gorchymyn Cefnffordd Abergwaun i Fangor (Yr A487) (Ffordd Osgoi Porthmadog, Minffordd a Thremadog a Thynnu Statws Cefnffordd) 2009 (WSI 2009 No. 1505 (Cy. 146))
- The Fishguard to Bangor Trunk Road (A487) (Porthmadog, Minffordd and Tremadog Bypass and De-trunking) Order 2009 (WSI 2009 No. 1505 (W. 146))
- Rheoliadau'r Byrddau Iechyd Lleol (Swyddogaethau a Gyfarwyddir) (Cymru) 2009 (WSI 2009 No. 1511 (Cy. 147))
- The Local Health Boards (Directed Functions) (Wales) Regulations 2009 (WSI 2009 No. 1511 (W. 147))
- Rheoliadau Gwasanaeth Iechyd Gwladol (Ffioedd Ymwelwyr Tramor) (Diwygio) (Cymru) 2009 (WSI 2009 No. 1512 (Cy. 148))
- The National Health Service (Charges to Overseas Visitors) (Amendment) (Wales) Regulations 2009 (WSI 2009 No. 1512 (W. 148))
- Rheoliadau Marchnata Cynnyrch Garddwriaethol Ffres (Cymru) 2009 (WSI 2009 No. 1551 (Cy. 151))
- The Marketing of Fresh Horticultural Produce (Wales) Regulations 2009 (WSI 2009 No. 1551 (W. 151))
- Rheoliadau Cig (Ffioedd Rheolaethau Swyddogol) (Cymru) 2009 (WSI 2009 No. 1557 (Cy. 152))
- The Meat (Official Controls Charges) (Wales) Regulations 2009 (WSI 2009 No. 1557 (W. 152))
- Gorchymyn Ymddiriedolaethau'r Gwasanaeth Iechyd Gwladol (Trosglwyddo Staff, Eiddo, Hawliau a Rhwymedigaethau) (Cymru) 2009 (WSI 2009 No. 1558 (Cy. 153))
- The National Health Service Trusts (Transfer of Staff, Property, Rights and Liabilities) (Wales) Order 2009 (WSI 2009 No. 1558 (W. 153))
- Gorchymyn y Byrddau Iechyd Lleol (Trosglwyddo Staff, Eiddo, Hawliau a Rhwymedigaethau) (Cymru) 2009 (WSI 2009 No. 1559 (Cy. 154))
- The Local Health Boards (Transfer of Staff, Property, Rights and Liabilities) (Wales) Order 2009 (WSI 2009 No. 1559 (W. 154))
- Rheoliadau Clefyd Pothellog y Moch (Cymru) (Diwygio) 2009 (WSI 2009 No. 1580 (Cy. 156))
- The Swine Vesicular Disease (Wales) (Amendment) Regulations 2009 (WSI 2009 No. 1580 (W. 156))
- Gorchymyn Addysg (Ciniawau Ysgol am Ddim) (Credyd Treth Gwaith) (Cymru) 2009 (WSI 2009 No. 1673 (Cy. 158))
- The Education (Free School Lunches) (Working Tax Credit) (Wales) Order 2009 (WSI 2009 No. 1673 (W. 158))
- Rheoliadau Bywyd Gwyllt a Chefn Gwlad (Cofrestru, Modrwyo a Marcio Adar Caeth Penodol) (Cymru) (Diwygio) 2009 (WSI 2009 No. 1733 (Cy. 161))
- The Wildlife and Countryside (Registration, Ringing and Marking of Certain Captive Birds) (Wales) (Amendment) Regulations 2009 (WSI 2009 No. 1733 (W. 161))
- Rheoliadau Arbelydru Bwyd(Cymru) 2009 (WSI 2009 No. 1795 (Cy. 162))
- The Food Irradiation (Wales) Regulations 2009 (WSI 2009 No. 1795 (W. 162))
- Gorchymyn Mesur Llywodraeth Leol (Cymru) 2009 (Cychwyn Rhif 1) 2009 (WSI 2009 No. 1796 (C. 88) (Cy. 163))
- The Local Government (Wales) Measure 2009 (Commencement No 1) Order 2009 (WSI 2009 No. 1796 (C. 88) (W. 163))
- Gorchymyn y Gwasanaeth Iechyd Gwladol (Ailstrwythuro Cyrff y Gwasanaeth Iechyd Gwladol: Diwygiadau Canlyniadol) (Cymru) 2009 (WSI 2009 No. 1824 (Cy. 165))
- The National Health Service (Restructuring of National Health Service Bodies: Consequential Amendments) (Wales) Order 2009 (WSI 2009 No. 1824 (W. 165))
- The National Health Service (General Medical Services Contracts) (Prescription of Drugs Etc) (Wales) (Amendment) Regulations 2009 (WSI 2009 No. 1838 (W. 166))
- Gorchymyn Coleg Garddwriaeth Cymru (Diddymu) 2009 (WSI 2009 No. 1841 (Cy. 167))
- The Welsh College of Horticulture (Dissolution) Order 2009 (WSI 2009 No. 1841 (W. 167))
- Gorchymyn Cod Derbyniadau Ysgol (Diwrnod Penodedig) (Cymru) 2009 (WSI 2009 No. 1844 (Cy. 168))
- The School Admissions Code (Appointed Day) (Wales) Order 2009 (WSI 2009 No. 1844 (W. 168))
- Gorchymyn Cod Apelau Derbyn Ysgol (Diwrnod Penodedig) (Cymru) 2009 (WSI 2009 No. 1845 (Cy. 169))
- The School Admission Appeals Code (Appointed Day) (Wales) Order 2009 (WSI 2009 No. 1845 (W. 169))
- Rheoliadau D_r Mwynol Naturiol, D_r Ffynnon a D_r Yfed wedi'i Botelu (Cymru) (Diwygio) 2009 (WSI 2009 No. 1897 (Cy. 170))
- The Natural Mineral Water, Spring Water and Bottled Drinking Water (Wales) (Amendment) Regulations 2009 (WSI 2009 No. 1897 (W. 170))
- Rheoliadau Cynhyrchion sy'n Dod o Anifeiliaid (Rheoli Clefydau) (Cymru) (Diwygio) (Rhif 2) 2009 (WSI 2009 No. 1910 (Cy. 173))
- The Products of Animal Origin (Disease Control) (Wales) (Amendment) (No. 2) Regulations 2009 (WSI 2009 No. 1910 (W. 173))
- Rheoliadau Tai Amlfeddiannaeth (Rheoli) (Cymru) 2009 (WSI 2009 No. 1915 (Cy. 174))
- The Houses in Multiple Occupation (Management) (Wales) Regulations 2009 (WSI 2009 No. 1915 (W. 174))
- Gorchymyn Deddf Plant a Phobl Ifanc 2008 (Cychwyn Rhif 2) (Cymru) 2009 (WSI 2009 No. 1921 (C. 91) (Cy. 175))
- The Children and Young Persons Act 2008 (Commencement No. 2) (Wales) Order 2009 (WSI 2009 No. 1921 (C. 91) (W. 175))
- Rheoliadau'r Gwasanaeth Iechyd Gwladol (Contractau Gwasanaethau Meddygol Cyffredinol) (Rhagnodi Cyffuriau Etc.) (Cymru) (Diwygio) (Rhif 2) 2009 (WSI 2009 No. 1977 (Cy. 176))
- The National Health Service (General Medical Services Contracts) (Prescription of Drugs Etc.) (Wales) (Amendment) (No.2) Regulations 2009 (WSI 2009 No. 1977 (W. 176))
- Gorchymyn Ymddiriedolaeth Gwasanaeth Iechyd Gwladol Iechyd Cyhoeddus Cymru (Sefydlu) 2009 (WSI 2009 No. 2058 (Cy. 177))
- The Public Health Wales National Health Service Trust (Establishment) Order 2009 (WSI 2009 No. 2058 (W. 177))
- Gorchymyn Ymddiriedolaeth Gwasanaeth Iechyd Gwladol Felindre (Sefydlu) (Diwygio) 2009 (WSI 2009 No. 2059 (Cy. 178))
- The Velindre National Health Service Trust (Establishment) (Amendment) Order 2009 (WSI 2009 No. 2059 (W. 178))
- Rheoliadau Ardrethu Annomestig (Taliadau Gohiriedig) (Cymru) 2009 (WSI 2009 No. 2154 (Cy. 179))
- The Non-Domestic Rating (Deferred Payments) (Wales) Regulations 2009 (WSI 2009 No. 2154 (W. 179))
- Rheoliadau Grantiau a Benthyciadau Dysgu y Cynulliad (Addysg Uwch) (Cymru) (Rhif 2) (Diwygio) 2009 (WSI 2009 No. 2156 (Cy. 180))
- The Assembly Learning Grants and Loans (Higher Education) (Wales) (No. 2) (Amendment) Regulations 2009 (WSI 2009 No. 2156 (W. 180))
- Rheoliadau Grantiau Dysgu'r Cynulliad (Sefydliadau Ewropeaidd) (Cymru) (Diwygio) 2009 (WSI 2009 No. 2157 (Cy. 181))
- The Assembly Learning Grants (European Institutions) (Wales) (Amendment) Regulations 2009 (WSI 2009 No. 2157 (W. 181))
- Rheoliadau Grant Dysgu'r Cynulliad (Addysg Bellach) 2009 (WSI 2009 No. 2158 (Cy. 182))
- The Assembly Learning Grant (Further Education) Regulations 2009 (WSI 2009 No. 2158 (W. 182))
- Rheoliadau Gwerthuso Athrawon Ysgol (Diwygio) (Cymru) 2009 (WSI 2009 No. 2159 (Cy. 183))
- The School Teacher Appraisal (Amendment) (Wales) Regulations 2009 (WSI 2009 No. 2159 (W. 183))
- Rheoliadau Cyngor Addysgu Cyffredinol Cymru (Swyddogaethau Disgyblu) (Diwygio Rhif 2) 2009 (WSI 2009 No. 2161 (Cy. 184))
- The General Teaching Council for Wales (Disciplinary Functions) (Amendment No. 2) Regulations 2009 (WSI 2009 No. 2161 (W. 184))
- Gorchymyn Cynllunio Gwlad a Thref (Datblygu Cyffredinol a Ganiateir) (Diwygio) (Cymru) 2009 (WSI 2009 No. 2193 (Cy. 185))
- The Town and Country Planning (General Permitted Development) (Amendment) (Wales) Order 2009 (WSI 2009 No. 2193 (W. 185))
- Rheoliadau Meini Prawf Purdeb ar gyfer Lliwiau, Melysyddion ac Ychwanegion Bwyd Amrywiol (Cymru) (Diwygio) 2009 (WSI 2009 No. 2201 (Cy. 186))
- The Purity Criteria for Colours, Sweeteners and Miscellaneous Food Additives (Wales) (Amendment) Regulations 2009 (WSI 2009 No. 2201 (W. 186))
- Rheoliadau'r Gwasanaeth Iechyd Gwladol (Treuliau Teithio a Pheidio â Chodi Tâl) (Cymru) (Diwygio) (Rhif 3) 2009 (WSI 2009 No. 2365 (Cy. 193))
- The National Health Service (Travelling Expenses and Remission of Charges) (Wales) (Amendment) (No.3) Regulations 2009 (WSI 2009 No. 2365 (W. 193))
- Rheoliadau Milheintiau a Sgil-gynhyrchion Anifeiliaid (Ffioedd) (Cymru) (Diwygio) 2009 (WSI 2009 No. 2427 (Cy. 197))
- The Zoonoses and Animal By-Products (Fees) (Wales) (Amendment) Regulations 2009 (WSI 2009 No. 2427 (W. 197))
- Rheoliadau Adnabod Ceffylau (Cymru) 2009 (WSI 2009 No. 2470 (Cy. 199))
- The Equine Identification (Wales) Regulations 2009 (WSI 2009 No. 2470 (W. 199))

== 201-300 ==
- Gorchymyn Deddf Llywodraeth Leol a Chynnwys y Cyhoedd mewn Iechyd 2007 (Cychwyn Rhif 2) (Cymru) 2009 (WSI 2009 No. 2539 (C. 105) (Cy. 203))
- The Local Government and Public Involvement in Health Act 2007 (Commencement No. 2) (Wales) Order 2009 (WSI 2009 No. 2539 (C. 105) (W. 203))
- Gorchymyn Deddf yr Heddlu a Chyfiawnder 2006 (Cychwyn Rhif 2) (Cymru) 2009 (WSI 2009 No. 2540 (C. 106) (Cy. 204))
- The Police and Justice Act 2006 (Commencement No. 2) (Wales) Order 2009 (WSI 2009 No. 2540 (C. 106) (W. 204))
- Rheoliadau Deddf Plant 1989, Deddf Safonau Gofal 2000 a Deddf Mabwysiadu a Phlant 2002 (Diwygiadau Amrywiol) (Cymru) 2009 (WSI 2009 No. 2541 (Cy. 205))
- The Children Act 1989, Care Standards Act 2000 and Adoption and Children Act 2002 (Miscellaneous Amendments) (Wales) Regulations 2009 (WSI 2009 No. 2541 (W. 205))
- Rheoliadau Addysg (Diwygiadau Amrywiol ynghylch Diogelu Plant) (Cymru) 2009 (WSI 2009 No. 2544 (Cy. 206))
- The Education (Miscellaneous Amendments relating to Safeguarding Children) (Wales) Regulations 2009 (WSI 2009 No. 2544 (W. 206))
- Gorchymyn Deddf Addysg ac Arolygiadau 2006 (Cychwyn Rhif 4 a Darpariaethau Trosiannol) (Cymru) 2009 (WSI 2009 No. 2545 (C. 107) (Cy. 207))
- The Education and Inspections Act 2006 (Commencement No. 4 and Transitional Provisions) (Wales) Order 2009 (WSI 2009 No. 2545 (C. 107) (W. 207))
- Rheoliadau Addysg (Ysgolion Annibynnol) (Personau Anaddas) (Cymru) 2009 (WSI 2009 No. 2558 (Cy. 208))
- The Education (Independent Schools) (Unsuitable Persons) (Wales) Regulations 2009 (WSI 2009 No. 2558 (W. 208))
- Rheoliadau Awdurdodau Lleol (Tribiwnlysoedd Achos a Thribiwnlysoedd Achos Interim a Phwyllgorau Safonau) (Diwygio) (Cymru) 2009 (WSI 2009 No. 2578 (Cy. 209))
- The Local Authorities (Case and Interim Case Tribunals and Standards Committees) (Amendment) (Wales) Regulations 2009 (WSI 2009 No. 2578 (W. 209))
- Rheoliadau'r Gwasanaeth Iechyd Gwladol (Presgripsiynau am Ddim a Ffioedd am Gyffuriau a Chyfarpar) (Cymru) (Diwygio) 2009 (WSI 2009 No. 2607 (Cy. 210))
- The National Health Service (Free Prescriptions and Charges for Drugs and Appliances) (Wales) (Amendment) Regulations 2009 (WSI 2009 No. 2607 (W. 210))
- Gorchymyn Dileu Twbercwlosis (Cymru) 2009 (WSI 2009 No. 2614 (Cy. 212))
- The Tuberculosis Eradication (Wales) Order 2009 (WSI 2009 No. 2614 (W. 212))
- Gorchymyn y Gwasanaeth Iechyd Gwladol (Trosglwyddo Ystad Weddilliol) (Cymru) 2009 (WSI 2009 No. 2617 (Cy. 213))
- The National Health Service (Transfer of Residual Estate) (Wales) Order 2009 (WSI 2009 No. 2617 (W. 213))
- Gorchymyn Gweinidogion Cymru (Trosglwyddo Eiddo, Hawliau a Rhwymedigaethau) (Cymru) 2009 (WSI 2009 No. 2618 (Cy. 214))
- The Welsh Ministers (Transfer of Property, Rights and Liabilities) (Wales) Order 2009 (WSI 2009 No. 2618 (W. 214))
- Gorchymyn Canolfan Iechyd Cymru (Trosglwyddo Swyddogaethau, Eiddo, Hawliau a Rhwymedigaethau a Diddymu) (Cymru) 2009 (WSI 2009 No. 2623 (Cy. 215))
- The Wales Centre for Health (Transfer of Functions, Property, Rights and Liabilities and Abolition) (Wales) Order 2009 (WSI 2009 No. 2623 (W. 215))
- Gorchymyn Coleg Garddwriaeth Cymru (Diddymu) (Diwygio) 2009 (WSI 2009 No. 2633 (Cy. 216))
- The Welsh College of Horticulture (Dissolution) (Amendment) Order 2009 (WSI 2009 No. 2633 (W. 216))
- Gorchymyn Deddf Cynllunio a Phrynu Gorfodol 2004 (Cychwyn Rhif 4 a Darpariaethau Canlyniadol a Throsiannol a Darpariaethau Arbed) (Cymru) (Diwygio Rhif 1) 2009 (WSI 2009 No. 2645 (Cy. 217))
- The Planning and Compulsory Purchase Act 2004 (Commencement No.4 and Consequential, Transitional and Savings Provisions) (Wales) (Amendment No.1) Order 2009 (WSI 2009 No. 2645 (W. 217))
- Rheoliadau Labelu Bwyd (Gwybodaeth Faethol) (Cymru) 2009 (WSI 2009 No. 2705 (Cy. 224))
- The Food Labelling (Nutrition Information) (Wales) Regulations 2009 (WSI 2009 No. 2705 (W. 224))
- Gorchymyn y Dreth Gyngor ac Ardrethu Annomestig (Cyfathrebiadau Electronig) (Cymru) 2009 (WSI 2009 No. 2706 (Cy. 225))
- The Council Tax and Non-Domestic Rating (Electronic Communications) (Wales) Order 2009 (WSI 2009 No. 2706 (W. 225))
- Rheoliadau Staffio Ysgolion a Gynhelir (Cymru) (Diwygio) 2009 (WSI 2009 No. 2708 (Cy. 226))
- The Staffing of Maintained Schools (Wales) (Amendment) Regulations 2009 (WSI 2009 No. 2708 (W. 226))
- Gorchymyn Conwy (Llandudno a Chonwy) 2009 (WSI 2009 No. 2717 (Cy. 229))
- The Conwy (Llandudno and Conwy) Order 2009 (WSI 2009 No. 2717 (W. 229))
- Gorchymyn Wrecsam (Cymunedau) 2009 (WSI 2009 No. 2718 (Cy. 230))
- The Wrexham (Communities) Order 2009 (WSI 2009 No. 2718 (W. 230))
- Gorchymyn Gwahardd Pysgota am Gregyn Bylchog (Cymru) 2009 (WSI 2009 No. 2721 (Cy. 232))
- The Prohibition of Fishing for Scallops (Wales) Order 2009 (WSI 2009 No. 2721 (W. 232))
- Rheoliadau Personau sy'n Darparu Addysg Mewn Sefydliadau Addysg Bellach yng Nghymru (Amodau) (Diwygio) 2009 (WSI 2009 No. 2730 (Cy. 234))
- The Persons Providing Education at Further Education Institutions in Wales (Conditions) (Amendment) Regulations 2009 (WSI 2009 No. 2730 (W. 234))
- Rheoliadau Grantiau a Benthyciadau Dysgu y Cynulliad (Addysg Uwch) (Cymru) 2009 (WSI 2009 No. 2737 (Cy. 235))
- The Assembly Learning Grants and Loans (Higher Education) (Wales) Regulations 2009 (WSI 2009 No. 2737 (W. 235))
- Gorchymyn Pwyllgor Defnyddwyr Trafnidiaeth Gyhoeddus Cymru (Sefydlu) 2009 (WSI 2009 No. 2816 (Cy. 243))
- The Public Transport Users' Committee for Wales (Establishment) Order 2009 (WSI 2009 No. 2816 (W. 243))
- Gorchymyn Gweld Ystadegau Swyddogol cyn eu Rhyddhau (Cymru) 2009 (WSI 2009 No. 2818 (Cy. 244))
- The Pre-release Access to Official Statistics (Wales) Order 2009 (WSI 2009 No. 2818 (W. 244))
- Gorchymyn Mesur Teithio gan Ddysgwyr (Cymru) 2008 (Cychwyn Rhif 2) 2009 (WSI 2009 No. 2819 (C. 124) (Cy. 245))
- The Learner Travel (Wales) Measure 2008 (Commencement No. 2) Order 2009 (WSI 2009 No. 2819 (C. 124) (W. 245))
- Gorchymyn Cynlluniau Cyfunol y Gwasanaethau Tân ac Achub (Amrywio) (Cymru) 2009 (WSI 2009 No. 2849 (Cy. 249))
- The Combined Fire and Rescue Services Schemes (Variation) (Wales) Order 2009 (WSI 2009 No. 2849 (W. 249))
- Rheoliadau Gwastraff Peryglus (Cymru) (Diwygio) 2009 (WSI 2009 No. 2861 (Cy. 250))
- The Hazardous Waste (Wales) (Amendment) Regulations 2009 (WSI 2009 No. 2861 (W. 250))
- Rheoliadau Gwerthuso Athrawon Ysgol (Cymru) (Diwygiad Rhif 2) 2009 (WSI 2009 No. 2864 (Cy. 251))
- The School Teacher Appraisal (Wales) (Amendment No. 2) Regulations 2009 (WSI 2009 No. 2864 (W. 251))
- Rheoliadau Labelu Bwyd (Datgan Alergenau) (Cymru) 2009 (WSI 2009 No. 2880 (Cy. 253))
- The Food Labelling (Declaration of Allergens) (Wales) Regulations 2009 (WSI 2009 No. 2880 (W. 253))
- Rheoliadau Bwyd Anifeiliaid (Sylweddau Annymunol Penodedig) (Cymru) 2009 (WSI 2009 No. 2881 (Cy. 254))
- The Feed (Specified Undesirable Substances) (Wales) Regulations 2009 (WSI 2009 No. 2881 (W. 254))
- Gorchymyn Pwyllgor Defnyddwyr Trafnidiaeth Gyhoeddus Cymru (Sefydlu) (Diwygio) 2009 (WSI 2009 No. 2915 (Cy. 255))
- The Public Transport Users' Committee for Wales (Establishment) (Amendment) Order 2009 (WSI 2009 No. 2915 (W. 255))
- Rheoliadau Halogion mewn Bwyd (Cymru) (Diwygio) 2009 (WSI 2009 No. 2939 (Cy. 256))
- The Contaminants in Food (Wales) (Amendment) Regulations 2009 (WSI 2009 No. 2939 (W. 256))
- Gorchymyn Symud Anifeiliaid (Cyfyngiadau) (Cymru) (Diwygio) 2009 (WSI 2009 No. 2940 (Cy. 257))
- The Movement of Animals (Restrictions) (Wales) (Amendment) Order 2009 (WSI 2009 No. 2940 (W. 257))
- Rheoliadau Tatws Hadyd (Cymru) (Diwygio) 2009 (WSI 2009 No. 2980 (Cy. 259))
- The Seed Potatoes (Wales) (Amendment) Regulations 2009 (WSI 2009 No. 2980 (W. 259))
- Rheoliadau Awdurdodau Lleol (Trefniadau Gweithrediaeth) (Swyddogaethau a Chyfrifoldebau) (Cymru) (Diwygio) 2009 (WSI 2009 No. 2983 (Cy. 260))
- The Local Authorities (Executive Arrangements) (Functions and Responsibilities) (Wales) (Amendment) Regulations 2009 (WSI 2009 No. 2983 (W. 260))
- Rheoliadau Awdurdodau Lleol (Trefniadau Amgen) (Cymru) (Diwygio) 2009 (WSI 2009 No. 2993 (Cy. 262))
- The Local Authorities (Alternative Arrangements) (Wales) (Amendment) Regulations 2009 (WSI 2009 No. 2993 (W. 262))
- Rheoliadau'r Gwasanaeth Iechyd Gwladol (Ffioedd Ymwelwyr Tramor) (Diwygio) (Rhif 2) (Cymru) 2009 (WSI 2009 No. 3005 (Cy. 264))
- The National Health Service (Charges to Overseas Visitors) (Amendment) (No.2) (Wales) Regulations 2009 (WSI 2009 No. 3005 (W. 264))
- Gorchymyn Bwrdeistref Sirol Pen-y-bont ar Ogwr (Cymunedau) 2009 (WSI 2009 No. 3047 (Cy. 266))
- The County Borough of Bridgend (Communities) Order 2009 (WSI 2009 No. 3047 (W. 266))
- Gorchymyn Strategaethau Troseddau ac Anhrefn (Disgrifiadau Rhagnodedig) (Cymru) 2009 (WSI 2009 No. 3050 (Cy. 267))
- The Crime and Disorder Strategies (Prescribed Descriptions) (Wales) Order 2009 (WSI 2009 No. 3050 (W. 267))
- Gorchymyn Dinas a Sir Caerdydd (Cymunedau Pentref Llaneirwg, Tredelerch a Trowbridge) 2009 (WSI 2009 No. 3052 (Cy. 268))
- The City and County of Cardiff (Old St. Mellons, Rumney and Trowbridge Communities) Order 2009 (WSI 2009 No. 3052 (W. 268))
- Rheoliadau Pwyllgor Gwasanaethau Iechyd Arbenigol Cymru (Cymru) 2009 (WSI 2009 No. 3097 (Cy. 270))
- The Welsh Health Specialised Services Committee (Wales) Regulations 2009 (WSI 2009 No. 3097 (W. 270))
- Rheoliadau Deunyddiau ac Eitemau mewn Cysylltiad â Bwyd (Cymru) (Diwygio) 2009 (WSI 2009 No. 3105 (Cy. 271))
- The Materials and Articles in Contact with Food (Wales) (Amendment) Regulations 2009 (WSI 2009 No. 3105 (W. 271))
- The Common Agricultural Policy Single Payment and Support Schemes (Wales) (Amendment) Regulations 2009 (WSI 2009 No. 3129 (W. 272))
- Rheoliadau Iechyd Planhigion (Ffioedd Arolygu Mewnforio) (Cymru) (Diwygio) (Rhif 2) 2009 (WSI 2009 No. 3140 (Cy. 273))
- The Plant Health (Import Inspection Fees) (Wales) (Amendment) (No.2) Regulations 2009 (WSI 2009 No. 3140 (W. 273))
- Rheoliadau Cyfraniadau Ardrethu Annomestig (Cymru) (Diwygio) 2009 (WSI 2009 No. 3147 (Cy. 274))
- The Non-Domestic Rating Contributions (Wales) (Amendment) Regulations 2009 (WSI 2009 No. 3147 (W. 274))
- Rheoliadau Staffio Ysgolion a Gynhelir (Cymru) (Diwygio Rhif 2) 2009 (WSI 2009 No. 3161 (Cy. 275))
- The Staffing of Maintained Schools (Wales) (Amendment No. 2) Regulations 2009 (WSI 2009 No. 3161 (W. 275))
- Gorchymyn Mesur Dysgu a Sgiliau (Cymru) 2009 (Cychwyn Rhif 1 a Darpariaeth Drosiannol) 2009 (WSI 2009 No. 3174 (C. 141) (Cy. 276))
- The Learning and Skills (Wales) Measure 2009 (Commencement No. 1 and Transitional Provision) Order 2009 (WSI 2009 No. 3174 (C. 141) (W. 276))
- GORCHYMYN CEFNFFORDD LLUNDAIN I ABERGWAUN (YR A40) (GWELLIANT WRTH THE KELL, TREFGARN) 2009 (WSI 2009 No. 3192 (Cy. 277))
- THE LONDON TO FISHGUARD TRUNK ROAD (A40) (IMPROVEMENT AT THE KELL, TREFFGARNE) ORDER 2009 (WSI 2009 No. 3192 (W. 277))
- Gorchymyn Ardaloedd Rheoli Mwg (Lleoedd Tân Esempt) (Cymru) 2009 (WSI 2009 No. 3224 (Cy. 278))
- The Smoke Control Areas (Exempted Fireplaces) (Wales) Order 2009 (WSI 2009 No. 3224 (W. 278))
- Rheoliadau Ardaloedd Rheoli Mwg (Tanwyddau Awdurdodedig) (Cymru) (Diwygio) 2009 (WSI 2009 No. 3225 (Cy. 279))
- The Smoke Control Areas (Authorised Fuels) (Wales) (Amendment) Regulations 2009 (WSI 2009 No. 3225 (W. 279))
- Gorchymyn Daliadau Amaethyddol (Unedau Cynhyrchu) (Cymru) 2009 (WSI 2009 No. 3232 (Cy. 280))
- The Agricultural Holdings (Units of Production) (Wales) Order 2009 (WSI 2009 No. 3232 (W. 280))
- Gorchymyn Pathogenau Anifeiliaid Penodedig (Cymru) (Diwygio) 2009 (WSI 2009 No. 3234 (Cy. 281))
- The Specified Animal Pathogens (Wales) (Amendment) Order 2009 (WSI 2009 No. 3234 (W. 281))
- Rheoliadau Atchwanegiadau Bwyd (Cymru) ac Ychwanegu Fitaminau, Mwynau a Sylweddau Eraill (Cymru) (Diwygio) 2009 (WSI 2009 No. 3252 (Cy. 282))
- The Food Supplements (Wales) and Addition of Vitamins, Minerals and Other Substances (Wales) (Amendment) Regulations 2009 (WSI 2009 No. 3252 (W. 282))
- Rheoliadau Bwyd at Ddefnydd Maethol Neilltuol (Ychwanegu Sylweddau at Ddibenion Maethol Penodol) (Cymru) 2009 (WSI 2009 No. 3254 (Cy. 283))
- The Food for Particular Nutritional Uses (Addition of Substances for Specific Nutritional Purposes) (Wales) Regulations 2009 (WSI 2009 No. 3254 (W. 283))
- Rheoliadau Addysg (Cwricwlwm Lleol ar gyfer Disgyblion yng Nghyfnod Allweddol 4) (Cymru) 2009 (WSI 2009 No. 3256 (Cy. 284))
- The Education (Local Curriculum for Pupils in Key Stage 4) (Wales) Regulations 2009 (WSI 2009 No. 3256 (W. 284))
- Rheoliadau Gofal Iechyd Preifat a Gwirfoddol (Cymru) (Diwygio) 2009 (WSI 2009 No. 3258 (Cy. 285))
- The Private and Voluntary Health Care (Wales) (Amendment) Regulations 2009 (WSI 2009 No. 3258 (W. 285))
- Rheoliadau Deddf Plant 1989 (Diwygio Rheoliadau Amrywiol) (Rhif 2) (Cymru) 2009 (WSI 2009 No. 3265 (Cy. 286))
- The Children Act 1989 (Amendment of Miscellaneous Regulations) (No. 2) (Wales) Regulations 2009 (WSI 2009 No. 3265 (W. 286))
- Rheoliadau Rhaglenni Datblygu Gwledig (Cymru) (Diwygio) 2009 (WSI 2009 No. 3270 (Cy. 287))
- The Rural Development Programmes (Wales) (Amendment) Regulations 2009 (WSI 2009 No. 3270 (W. 287))
- Gorchymyn Mesur Llywodraeth Leol (Cymru) 2009 (Cychwyn Rhif 2, Darpariaethau Trosiannol ac Arbedion) 2009 (WSI 2009 No. 3272 (C. 145) (Cy. 288))
- The Local Government (Wales) Measure 2009 (Commencement No. 2, Transitional Provisions and Savings) Order 2009 (WSI 2009 No. 3272 (C. 145) (W. 288))
- Rheoliadau Cynlluniau Partneriaethau Ansawdd (Cymru) 2009 (WSI 2009 No. 3293 (Cy. 290))
- The Quality Partnership Schemes (Wales) Regulations 2009 (WSI 2009 No. 3293 (W. 290))
- Gorchymyn Deddf Trafnidiaeth Leol 2008 (Cychwyn Rhif 2) (Cymru) 2009 (WSI 2009 No. 3294 (C. 146) (Cy. 291))
- The Local Transport Act 2008 (Commencement No. 2) (Wales) Order 2009 (WSI 2009 No. 3294 (C. 146) (W. 291))
- Gorchymyn Deddf Prentisiaethau, Sgiliau, Plant a Dysgu 2009 (Cychwyn Rhif 1) (Cymru) 2009 (WSI 2009 No. 3341 (C. 152) (Cy. 292))
- The Apprenticeships, Skills, Children and Learning Act 2009 (Commencement No.1) (Wales) Order 2009 (WSI 2009 No. 3341 (C. 152) (W. 292))
- Rheoliadau Cynllunio Gwlad a Thref (Asesu Effeithiau Amgylcheddol) (Adolygiadau Amhenderfynedig o Hen Ganiatadau Mwynau) (Cymru) 2009 (WSI 2009 No. 3342 (Cy. 293))
- The Town and Country Planning (Environmental Impact Assessment) (Undetermined Reviews of Old Mineral Permissions) (Wales) Regulations 2009 (WSI 2009 No. 3342 (W. 293))
- Rheoliadau Addysg (Gwybodaeth am Blant sy'n cael eu Haddysg drwy Ddarpariaeth Amgen) (Cymru) 2009 (WSI 2009 No. 3355 (Cy. 294))
- The Education (Information About Children in Alternative Provision) (Wales) Regulations 2009 (WSI 2009 No. 3355 (W. 294))
- Rheoliadau Grantiau Dysgu'r Cynulliad (Athrofa Brifysol Ewropeaidd) (Cymru) 2009 (WSI 2009 No. 3359 (Cy. 295))
- The Assembly Learning Grants (European University Institute) (Wales) Regulations 2009 (WSI 2009 No. 3359 (W. 295))
- Gorchymyn Defaid a Geifr (Cofnodion, Adnabod a Symud) (Cymru) 2009 (WSI 2009 No. 3364 (Cy. 296))
- The Sheep and Goats (Records, Identification and Movement) (Wales) Order 2009 (WSI 2009 No. 3364 (W. 296))
- Gorchymyn Cefnffordd Caerdydd i Lanconwy (yr A470) (Cwm-bach i'r Bontnewydd ar Wy) 2009 (WSI 2009 No. 3375 (Cy. 297))
- The Cardiff to Glan Conwy Trunk Road (A470) (Cwm-bach to Newbridge-on-Wye) Order 2009 (WSI 2009 No. 3375 (W. 297))
- Rheoliadau Rheolaethau Swyddogol ar Fwyd Anifeiliaid a Bwyd (Cymru) 2009 (WSI 2009 No. 3376 (Cy. 298))
- The Official Feed and Food Controls (Wales) Regulations 2009 (WSI 2009 No. 3376 (W. 298))
- Rheoliadau Ensymau Bwyd (Cymru) 2009 (WSI 2009 No. 3377 (Cy. 299))
- The Food Enzymes (Wales) Regulations 2009 (WSI 2009 No. 3377 (W. 299))
- Rheoliadau Ychwanegion Bwyd (Cymru) 2009 (WSI 2009 No. 3378 (Cy. 300))
- The Food Additives (Wales) Regulations 2009 (WSI 2009 No. 3378 (W. 300))

== 301 ==
- The Food (Jelly Mini-Cups) (Emergency Control) (Wales) Regulations 2009 (2009 No. 3379 (W. 301))
- Rheoliadau Bwyd (Jeli Cwpan Fach) (Rheolaeth Frys) (Cymru) 2009
