= List of Welsh statutory instruments, 2010 =

This is a complete list of Welsh statutory instruments made in 2010. Statutory instruments made by the Assembly are numbered in the main United Kingdom series with their own sub-series. The Welsh language has official equal status with the English language in Wales, so every statutory instrument made by the Assembly is officially published in both English and Welsh. The statutory instruments are secondary legislation, deriving their power from the acts of Parliament establishing and transferring functions and powers to the Welsh Assembly.

== 1-100 ==
- The Common Agricultural Policy Single Payment and Support Schemes (Cross Compliance) (Wales) (Amendment) Regulations 2010 (WSI 2010 No. 38 (W. 11))
- Gorchymyn Siroedd Wedi'u Cadw Powys a Morgannwg Ganol (Newid yn Ardaloedd) 2010 (WSI 2010 Rhif. 48 (Cy. 13))
- The Preserved Counties of Powys and Mid Glamorgan (Changes in Area) Order 2010 (WSI 2010 No. 48 (W. 13))
- Gorchymyn Rheoli Salmonela mewn Heidiau o Dyrcwn (Cymru) 2010 (WSI 2010 Rhif. 65 (Cy. 15))
- The Control of Salmonella in Turkey Flocks (Wales) Order 2010 (WSI 2010 No. 65 (W. 15))
- Rheoliadau Cyflenwadau Dŵr Preifat (Cymru) 2010 (WSI 2010 Rhif. 66 (Cy. 16))
- The Private Water Supplies (Wales) Regulations 2010 (WSI 2010 No. 66 (W. 16))
- Rheoliadau Traffordd yr M4 (Cyffordd 24, Cyfnewidfa Coldra, Casnewydd) (Terfyn Cyflymder 40 MYA) 2010 (WSI 2010 Rhif. 71 (Cy. 17))
- The M4 Motorway (Junction 24, Coldra Interchange, Newport) (40 MPH Speed Limit) Regulations 2010 (WSI 2010 No. 71 (W. 17))
- Rheoliadau'r Dreth Gyngor (Newid Rhestrau ac Apelau) (Diwygio) (Cymru) 2010 (WSI 2010 Rhif. 77 (Cy. 18))
- The Council Tax (Alteration of Lists and Appeals) (Amendment) (Wales) Regulations 2010 (WSI 2010 No. 77 (W. 18))
- Rheoliadau Prisio ar gyfer Ardrethu (Peiriannau a Pheirianwaith) (Cymru) (Diwygio) 2010 (WSI 2010 Rhif. 146 (Cy. 21))
- The Valuation for Rating (Plant and Machinery) (Wales) (Amendment) Regulations 2010 (WSI 2010 No. 146 (W. 21))
- Rheoliadau Cyflenwadau Dŵr Preifat (Cymru) (Diwygio) 2010 (WSI 2010 Rhif. 147 (Cy. 22))
- The Private Water Supplies (Wales) (Amendment) Regulations 2010 (WSI 2010 No. 147 (W. 22))
- Rheoliadau Gwybodaeth am Deithio gan Ddysgwyr (Cymru) (Diwygio) 2010 (WSI 2010 Rhif. 192 (Cy. 27))
- The Learner Travel Information (Wales) (Amendment) Regulations 2010 (WSI 2010 No. 192 (W. 27))
- Rheoliadau Grant Gweithredwyr Gwasanaethau Bysiau (Cymru) (Diwygio) 2010 (WSI 2010 Rhif. 193 (Cy. 28))
- The Bus Service Operators Grant (Wales) (Amendment) Regulations 2010 (WSI 2010 No. 193 (W. 28))
- Gorchymyn Consesiynau Teithio (Gwasanaethau Cymwys) (Diwygio) 2010 (WSI 2010 Rhif. 194 (Cy. 29))
- The Travel Concessions (Eligible Services) (Amendment) Order 2010 (WSI 2010 No. 194 (W. 29))
- Gorchymyn Pysgota am Gregyn Bylchog (Cymru) (Rhif 2) 2010 (WSI 2010 Rhif. 269 (Cy. 33))
- The Scallop Fishing (Wales) (No.2) Order 2010 (WSI 2010 No. 269 (W. 33))
- Rheoliadau Ardrethu Annomestig (Hysbysiadau Galw am Dalu) (Cymru) (Diwygio) 2010 (WSI 2010 Rhif. 271 (Cy. 34))
- The Non-Domestic Rating (Demand Notices) (Wales) (Amendment) Regulations 2010 (WSI 2010 No. 271 (W. 34))
- Rheoliadau Ardrethu Annomestig (Eiddo Heb ei Feddiannu) (Cymru) (Diwygio) 2010 (WSI 2010 Rhif. 272 (Cy. 35))
- The Non-Domestic Rating (Unoccupied Property) (Wales) (Amendment) Regulations 2010 (WSI 2010 No. 272 (W. 35))
- Gorchymyn Ardrethu Annomestig (Rhyddhad Ardrethi i Fusnesau Bach) (Cymru) (Diwygio) 2010 (WSI 2010 Rhif. 273 (Cy. 36))
- The Non-Domestic Rating (Small Business Relief) (Wales) (Amendment) Order 2010 (WSI 2010 No. 273 (W. 36))
- Rheoliadau Cynghorau Iechyd Cymuned (Cyfansoddiad, Aelodaeth a Gweithdrefnau) (Cymru) 2010 (WSI 2010 Rhif. 288 (Cy. 37))
- The Community Health Councils (Constitution, Membership and Procedures) (Wales) Regulations 2010 (WSI 2010 No. 288 (W. 37))
- Gorchymyn Cynghorau Iechyd Cymuned (Sefydlu, Trosglwyddo Swyddogaethau a Diddymu) (Cymru) 2010 (WSI 2010 Rhif. 289 (Cy. 38))
- The Community Health Councils (Establishment, Transfer of Functions and Abolition) (Wales) Order 2010 (WSI 2010 No. 289 (W. 38))
- Rheoliadau Grantiau Adnewyddu Tai (Diwygio) (Cymru) 2010 (WSI 2010 Rhif. 297 (Cy. 39))
- The Housing Renewal Grants (Amendment) (Wales) Regulations 2010 (WSI 2010 No. 297 (W. 39))
- Rheoliadau Awdurdodau Lleol (Addasu Cyfrifiadau Angenrheidiol) (Cymru) 2010 (WSI 2010 Rhif. 317 (Cy. 41))
- The Local Authorities (Alteration of Requisite Calculations) (Wales) Regulations 2010 (WSI 2010 No. 317 (W. 41))
- Rheoliadau Bwyd at Ddefnydd Maethol Neilltuol (Diwygiadau Amrywiol) (Cymru) 2010 (WSI 2010 Rhif. 363 (Cy. 45))
- The Food for Particular Nutritional Uses (Miscellaneous Amendments) (Wales) Regulations 2010 (WSI 2010 No. 363 (W. 45))
- Rheoliadau Cynllunio (Sylweddau Peryglus) (Diwygio) (Cymru) 2010 (WSI 2010 Rhif. 450 (Cy. 48))
- The Planning (Hazardous Substances) (Amendment) (Wales) Regulations 2010 (WSI 2010 No. 450 (W. 48))
- Rheoliadau Cynlluniau Effeithlonrwydd Ynni Cartref (Cymru) (Diwygio) 2010 (WSI 2010 Rhif. 453 (Cy. 49))
- The Home Energy Efficiency Schemes (Wales) (Amendment) Regulations 2010 (WSI 2010 No. 453 (W. 49))
- Gorchymyn Awdurdodau Tân ac Achub (Cynlluniau Gwella) (Cymru) 2010 (WSI 2010 Rhif. 481 (Cy. 50))
- The Fire and Rescue Authorities (Improvement Plans) (Wales) Order 2010 (WSI 2010 No. 481 (W. 50))
- Gorchymyn Llywodraeth Leol (Dangosyddion Perfformiad a Safonau Perfformiad) (Cymru) 2010 (WSI 2010 Rhif. 482 (Cy. 51))
- The Local Government (Performance Indicators and Standards) (Wales) Order 2010 (WSI 2010 No. 482 (W. 51))
- Rheoliadau Atal Llygredd Nitradau (Cymru) (Diwygio) 2010 (WSI 2010 Rhif. 489 (Cy. 55))
- The Nitrate Pollution Prevention (Wales) (Amendment) Regulations 2010 (WSI 2010 No. 489 (W. 55))
- Gorchymyn Corfforaeth Addysg Bellach Coleg Meirion-Dwyfor (Diddymu) 2010 (WSI 2010 Rhif. 562 (Cy. 57))
- The Coleg Meirion-Dwyfor Further Education Corporation (Dissolution) Order 2010 (WSI 2010 No. 562 (W. 57))
- Rheoliadau'r Dreth Gyngor (Dosbarthau Rhagnodedig ar Anheddau) (Cymru) (Diwygio) 2010 (WSI 2010 Rhif. 612 (Cy. 58))
- The Council Tax (Prescribed Classes of Dwellings) (Wales) (Amendment) Regulations 2010 (WSI 2010 No. 612 (W. 58))
- Gorchymyn y Dreth Gyngor (Cyfathrebiadau Electronig) (Cymru) 2010 (WSI 2010 Rhif. 613 (Cy. 59))
- The Council Tax (Electronic Communications) (Wales) Order 2010 (WSI 2010 No. 613 (W. 59))
- Gorchymyn Iechyd Anifeiliaid (Rheolwyr Milfeddygol Rhanbarthol) (Cymru) 2010 (WSI 2010 Rhif. 618 (Cy. 60))
- The Animal Health (Divisional Veterinary Managers) (Wales) Order 2010 (WSI 2010 No. 618 (W. 60))
- Rheoliadau Anifeiliaid (Rheolwyr Milfeddygol Rhanbarthol) (Cymru) 2010 (WSI 2010 Rhif. 619 (Cy. 61))
- The Animals (Divisional Veterinary Managers) (Wales) Regulations 2010 (WSI 2010 No. 619 (W. 61))
- Rheoliadau'r Gwasanaeth Iechyd Gwladol (Diwygiadau sy'n ymwneud â Ffioedd a Thaliadau Optegol) (Cymru) 2010 (WSI 2010 Rhif. 636 (Cy. 62))
- The National Health Service (Amendments relating to Optical Charges and Payments) (Wales) Regulations 2010 (WSI 2010 No. 636 (W. 62))
- Rheoliadau Grant Dysgu'r Cynulliad (Addysg Bellach) (Diwygio) 2010 (WSI 2010 Rhif. 637 (Cy. 63))
- The Assembly Learning Grant (Further Education) (Amendment) Regulations 2010 (WSI 2010 No. 637 (W. 63))
- Rheoliadau Ffedereiddio Ysgolion a Gynhelir a Diwygiadau Amrywiol (Cymru) 2010 (WSI 2010 Rhif. 638 (Cy. 64))
- The Federation of Maintained Schools and Miscellaneous Amendments (Wales) Regulations 2010 (WSI 2010 No. 638 (W. 64))
- Gorchymyn Ardrethu Annomestig (Diffiniad o Eiddo Domestig) (Cymru) 2010 (WSI 2010 Rhif. 682 (Cy. 65))
- The Non-Domestic Rating (Definition of Domestic Property) (Wales) Order 2010 (WSI 2010 No. 682 (W. 65))
- Rheoliadau Cyfrifon ac Archwilio (Cymru) (Diwygio) 2010 (WSI 2010 Rhif. 683 (Cy. 66))
- The Accounts and Audit (Wales) (Amendment) Regulations 2010 (WSI 2010 No. 683 (W. 66))
- Rheoliadau Awdurdodau Lleol (Cyllid Cyfalaf a Chyfrifyddu) (Cymru) (Diwygio) 2010 (WSI 2010 Rhif. 685 (Cy. 67))
- The Local Authorities (Capital Finance and Accounting) (Wales) (Amendment) Regulations 2010 (WSI 2010 No. 685 (W. 67))
- Gorchymyn Deddf Addysg 2002 (Cychwyn Rhif 13) (Cymru) 2010 (WSI 2010 No. 707 (C. 45) (Cy. 68))
- The Education Act 2002 (Commencement No. 13) (Wales) Order 2010 (WSI 2010 No. 707 (C. 45) (W. 68))
- Rheoliadau Tribiwnlys Prisio Cymru 2010 (WSI 2010 Rhif. 713 (Cy. 69))
- The Valuation Tribunal for Wales Regulations 2010 (WSI 2010 No. 713 (W. 69))
- Rheoliadau'r Gwasanaeth Iechyd Gwladol (Gwasanaethau Meddygol Sylfaenol) (Diwygiadau Amrywiol) (Cymru) 2010 (WSI 2010 Rhif. 729 (Cy. 70))
- The National Health Service (Primary Medical Services) (Miscellaneous Amendments) (Wales) Regulations 2010 (WSI 2010 No. 729 (W. 70))
- Rheoliadau'r Gwasanaeth Iechyd Gwladol (Ffioedd Ymwelwyr Tramor) (Diwygio) (Cymru) 2010 (WSI 2010 Rhif. 730 (Cy. 71))
- The National Health Service (Charges to Overseas Visitors) (Amendment) (Wales) Regulations 2010 (WSI 2010 No. 730 (W. 71))
- Gorchymyn Deddf Addysg 2005 (Cychwyn Rhif 2) (Cymru) 2010 (WSI 2010 Rhif. 735 (Cy. 72) (C. 49))
- The Education Act 2005 (Commencement No. 2) (Wales) Order 2010 (WSI 2010 No. 735 (W. 72) (C. 49))
- Gorchymyn Deddf Addysg ac Arolygiadau 2006 (Cychwyn Rhif 5 a Darpariaeth Drosiannol) (Cymru) 2010 (WSI 2010 Rhif. 736 (Cy. 73) (C. 50))
- The Education and Inspections Act 2006 (Commencement No. 5 and Transitional Provision) (Wales) Order 2010 (WSI 2010 No. 736 (W. 73) (C. 50))
- Rheoliadau Adolygu Penderfyniadau'n Annibynnol (Mabwysiadu a Maethu) (Cymru) 2010 (WSI 2010 Rhif. 746 (Cy. 75))
- The Independent Review of Determinations (Adoption and Fostering) (Wales) Regulations 2010 (WSI 2010 No. 746 (W. 75))
- Rheoliadau Dŵr Mwynol Naturiol, Dŵr Ffynnon a Dŵr Yfed wedi'i Botelu (Cymru) (Diwygio) 2010 (WSI 2010 Rhif. 748 (Cy. 76))
- The Natural Mineral Water, Spring Water and Bottled Drinking Water (Wales) (Amendment) Regulations 2010 (WSI 2010 No. 748 (W. 76))
- Gorchymyn Deddf Plant a Phobl Ifanc 2008 (Cychwyn Rhif 3) (Cymru) 2010 (WSI 2010 No. 749 (C. 51) (Cy. 77))
- The Children and Young Persons Act 2008 (Commencement No.3) (Wales) Order 2010 (WSI 2010 No. 749 (C. 51) (W. 77))
- Rheoliadau Labelu Pysgod (Cymru) 2010 (WSI 2010 Rhif. 797 (Cy. 78))
- The Fish Labelling (Wales) Regulations 2010 (WSI 2010 No. 797 (W. 78))
- Rheoliadau Cymorth Gwladol (Asesu Adnoddau a Symiau at Anghenion Personol) (Diwygio) (Cymru) 2010 (WSI 2010 Rhif. 799 (Cy. 79))
- The National Assistance (Assessment of Resources and Sums for Personal Requirements) (Amendment) (Wales) Regulations 2010 (WSI 2010 No. 799 (W. 79))
- Gorchymyn Deddf Safonau a Fframwaith Ysgolion 1998 (Diddymu) (Cymru) 2010 (WSI 2010 Rhif. 823 (Cy. 86))
- The School Standards and Framework Act 1998 (Repeal) (Wales) Order 2010 (WSI 2010 No. 823 (W. 86))
- Rheoliadau Cyllido Ysgolion (Cymru) 2010 (WSI 2010 Rhif. 824 (Cy. 87))
- The School Funding (Wales) Regulations 2010 (WSI 2010 No. 824 (W. 87))
- Rheoliadau'r Gwasanaeth Iechyd Gwladol (Gwasanaethau Fferyllol) (Diwygio) (Cymru) 2010 (WSI 2010 Rhif. 868 (Cy. 90))
- The National Health Service (Pharmaceutical Services) (Amendment) (Wales) Regulations 2010 (WSI 2010 No. 868 (W. 90))
- Rheoliadau Hylendid Bwyd (Cymru) (Diwygio) 2010 (WSI 2010 Rhif. 893 (Cy. 92))
- The Food Hygiene (Wales) (Amendment) Regulations 2010 (WSI 2010 No. 893 (W. 92))
- Gorchymyn Crynoadau Anifeiliaid (Cymru) 2010 (WSI 2010 Rhif. 900 (Cy. 93))
- The Animal Gatherings (Wales) Order 2010 (WSI 2010 No. 900 (W. 93))
- Rheoliadau'r Gwasanaeth Iechyd Gwladol (Ffioedd Ymwelwyr Tramor) (Diwygiadau Amrywiol) (Cymru) 2010 (WSI 2010 Rhif. 927 (Cy. 94))
- The National Health Service (Charges to Overseas Visitors) (Miscellaneous Amendments) (Wales) Regulations 2010 (WSI 2010 No. 927 (W. 94))
- Gorchymyn Deddf Iechyd 2009 (Cychwyn Rhif 1) (Cymru) 2010 (WSI 2010 No. 930 (C. 63) (Cy. 95))
- The Health Act 2009 (Commencement No. 1) (Wales) Order 2010 (WSI 2010 No. 930 (C. 63) (W. 95))
- Gorchymyn Bwrdeistref Sirol Caerffili (Cymunedau) 2010 (WSI 2010 Rhif. 934 (Cy. 96))
- The County Borough of Caerphilly (Communities) Order 2010 (WSI 2010 No. 934 (W. 96))
- Rheoliadau Lles Anifeiliaid (Coleri Electronig) (Cymru) 2010 (WSI 2010 Rhif. 943 (Cy. 97))
- The Animal Welfare (Electronic Collars) (Wales) Regulations 2010 (WSI 2010 No. 943 (W. 97))
- Gorchymyn Deddf Iechyd a Gofal Cymdeithasol 2008 (Cychwyn Rhif 2 a Darpariaethau Trosiannol) (Cymru) 2010 (WSI 2010 No. 989 (C. 67) (Cy. 98))
- The Health and Social Care Act 2008 (Commencement No. 2 and Transitional Provisions) (Wales) Order 2010 (WSI 2010 No. 989 (C. 67) (W. 98))
- The Water Supply (Water Quality) Regulations 2010 (WSI 2010 No. 994 (W. 99))
- Rheoliadau Labelu Bwyd (Gwybodaeth Faethol) (Cymru) (Diwygio) 2010 (WSI 2010 Rhif. 1069 (Cy. 100))
- The Food Labelling (Nutrition Information) (Wales) (Amendment) Regulations 2010 (WSI 2010 No. 1069 (W. 100))

== 101-200 ==
- Gorchymyn Awdurdodau Addysg Lleol ac Awdurdodau Gwasanaethau Plant (Integreiddio Swyddogaethau) (Is-ddeddfwriaeth) (Cymru) 2010 (WSI 2010 Rhif. 1142 (Cy. 101))
- The Local Education Authorities and Children's Services Authorities (Integration of Functions) (Subordinate Legislation) (Wales) Order 2010 (WSI 2010 No. 1142 (W. 101))
- Gorchymyn Gweinidogion Cymru (Trosglwyddo Eiddo, Hawliau a Rhwymedigaethau) (Cymru) 2010 (WSI 2010 Rhif. 1147 (Cy. 102))
- The Welsh Ministers (Transfer of Property, Rights and Liabilities) (Wales) Order 2010 (WSI 2010 No. 1147 (W. 102))
- Gorchymyn Awdurdodau Addysg Lleol ac Awdurdodau Gwasanaethau Plant (Integreiddio Swyddogaethau) (Cymru) 2010 (WSI 2010 Rhif. 1148 (Cy. 103))
- The Local Education Authorities and Children's Services Authorities (Integration of Functions) (Wales) Order 2010 (WSI 2010 No. 1148 (W. 103))
- Rheoliadau Deddf Diogelu Grwpiau Hyglwyf 2006 (Gweithgarwch Rheoledig) (Cymru) 2010 (WSI 2010 Rhif. 1171 (Cy. 104))
- The Safeguarding Vulnerable Groups Act 2006 (Controlled Activity) (Wales) Regulations 2010 (WSI 2010 No. 1171 (W. 104))
- Rheoliadau'r Gwasanaeth Iechyd Gwladol (Treuliau Teithio a Pheidio â Chodi Tâl) (Cymru) (Diwygio) 2010 (WSI 2010 Rhif. 1237 (Cy. 107))
- The National Health Service (Travelling Expenses and Remission of Charges) (Wales) (Amendment) Regulations 2010 (WSI 2010 No. 1237 (W. 107))
- Rheoliadau Deddf Diogelu Grwpiau Hyglwyf 2006 (Cyfnod Rhagnodedig a Swyddog Priodol) (Cymru) 2010 (WSI 2010 Rhif. 1291 (Cy. 110))
- The Safeguarding Vulnerable Groups Act 2006 (Prescribed Period and Appropriate Officer) (Wales) Regulations 2010 (WSI 2010 No. 1291 (W. 110))
- Gorchymyn Deddf Cyfrifon Banc a Chymdeithasau Adeiladu Segur 2008 (Cyfyngiadau Rhagnodedig) (Cymru) 2010 (WSI 2010 Rhif. 1317 (Cy. 111))
- The Dormant Bank and Building Society Accounts Act 2008 (Prescribed Restrictions) (Wales) Order 2010 (WSI 2010 No. 1317 (W. 111))
- Gorchymyn Deddf Plant a Phobl Ifanc 2008 (Cychwyn Rhif 4) (Cymru) 2010 (WSI 2010 Rhif. 1329 (Cy. 112) (C. 81))
- The Children and Young Persons Act 2008 (Commencement No. 4) (Wales) Order 2010 (WSI 2010 No. 1329 (W. 112) (C. 81))
- Rheoliadau Cig (Ffioedd Rheolaethau Swyddogol) (Cymru) (Diwygio) 2010 (WSI 2010 Rhif. 1360 (Cy. 115))
- The Meat (Official Controls Charges) (Wales) (Amendment) Regulations 2010 (WSI 2010 No. 1360 (W. 115))
- Rheoliadau'r Cyfrifiad (Cymru) 2010 (WSI 2010 Rhif. 1361 (Cy. 116))
- The Census (Wales) Regulations 2010 (WSI 2010 No. 1361 (W. 116))
- Gorchymyn Coleg Gŵyr Abertawe (Corffori) 2010 (WSI 2010 Rhif. 1368 (Cy. 118))
- The Gower College Swansea (Incorporation) Order 2010 (WSI 2010 No. 1368 (W. 118))
- Rheoliadau Corfforaeth Addysg Bellach Coleg Gŵyr Abertawe (Llywodraethu) 2010 (WSI 2010 Rhif. 1369 (Cy. 119))
- The Gower College Swansea Further Education Corporation (Government) Regulations 2010 (WSI 2010 No. 1369 (W. 119))
- Gorchymyn Deddf Plismona a Throsedd 2009 (Cychwyn Rhif 1) (Cymru) 2010 (WSI 2010 No. 1375 (C. 82) (Cy. 120))
- The Policing and Crime Act 2009 (Commencement No. 1) (Wales) Order 2010 (WSI 2010 No. 1375 (C. 82) (W. 120))
- Rheoliadau Bwyd (Jeli Cwpanau Bach) (Rheolaeth Frys) (Cymru) (Diwygio) 2010 (WSI 2010 Rhif. 1376 (Cy. 121))
- The Food (Jelly Mini-Cups) (Emergency Control) (Wales) (Amendment) Regulations 2010 (WSI 2010 No. 1376 (W. 121))
- Gorchymyn Twbercwlosis (Cymru) 2010 (WSI 2010 Rhif. 1379 (Cy. 122))
- The Tuberculosis (Wales) Order 2010 (WSI 2010 No. 1379 (W. 122))
- Rheoliadau Cyflenwadau Dŵr Preifat (Cymru) (Diwygio) (Rhif 2) 2010 (WSI 2010 Rhif. 1384 (Cy. 123))
- The Private Water Supplies (Wales) (Amendment) (No. 2) Regulations 2010 (WSI 2010 No. 1384 (W. 123))
- Gorchymyn Deddf Plismona a Throsedd 2009 (Darpariaethau Trosiannol ac Arbed) (Cymru) 2010 (WSI 2010 Rhif. 1395 (Cy. 124))
- The Policing and Crime Act 2009 (Transitional and Saving Provisions)(Wales) Order 2010 (WSI 2010 No. 1395 (W. 124))
- Gorchymyn Deddf y Môr a Mynediad i'r Arfordir 2009 (Darpariaethau Canlyniadol) (Cymru) 2010 (WSI 2010 Rhif. 1410 (Cy. 125))
- The Marine and Coastal Access Act 2009 (Consequential Provisions) (Wales) Order 2010 (WSI 2010 No. 1410 (W. 125))
- Rheoliadau Safonau Ansawdd Aer (Cymru) 2010 (WSI 2010 Rhif. 1433 (Cy. 126))
- The Air Quality Standards (Wales) Regulations 2010 (WSI 2010 No. 1433 (W. 126))
- Rheoliadau Addysg (Diwygiadau ynglŷn â'r Ysbeidiau rhwng Arolygiadau Addysg a Hyfforddiant) (Cymru) 2010 (WSI 2010 Rhif. 1436 (Cy. 127))
- The Education (Amendments Relating to the Intervals for the Inspection of Education and Training) (Wales) Regulations 2010 (WSI 2010 No. 1436 (W. 127))
- Gorchymyn Bro Morgannwg (Cymunedau) 2010 (WSI 2010 Rhif. 1451 (Cy. 129))
- The Vale of Glamorgan (Communities) Order 2010 (WSI 2010 No. 1451 (W. 129))
- Gorchymyn Deddf Iechyd a Gofal Cymdeithasol 2008 (Cychwyn Rhif 3) (Cymru) 2010 (WSI 2010 No. 1457 (C. 83) (Cy. 130))
- The Health and Social Care Act 2008 (Commencement No. 3) (Wales) Order 2010 (WSI 2010 No. 1457 (C. 83) (W. 130))
- Gorchymyn Dynodi Gorfodi Sifil ar Dramgwyddau Parcio (Dinas a Sir Caerdydd) 2010 (WSI 2010 Rhif. 1461 (Cy. 133))
- The Civil Enforcement of Parking Contraventions (City and County of Cardiff) Designation Order 2010 (WSI 2010 No. 1461 (W. 133))
- Rheoliadau Llaeth Yfed (Cymru) 2010 (WSI 2010 Rhif. 1492 (Cy. 135))
- The Drinking Milk (Wales) Regulations 2010 (WSI 2010 No. 1492 (W. 135))
- Rheoliadau Adnoddau Dŵr (Rheoli Llygredd) (Silwair, Slyri ac Olew Tanwydd Amaethyddol) (Cymru) 2010 (WSI 2010 Rhif. 1493 (Cy. 136))
- The Water Resources (Control of Pollution) (Silage, Slurry and Agriculture Fuel Oil) (Wales) Regulations 2010 (WSI 2010 No. 1493 (W. 136))
- Gorchymyn Blaenau Gwent (Cymunedau) 2010 (WSI 2010 Rhif. 1503 (Cy. 137))
- The Blaenau Gwent (Communities) Order 2010 (WSI 2010 No. 1503 (W. 137))
- Rheoliadau Traffordd yr M4 (Man Casglu Tollau Rogiet, Sir Fynwy)(Terfyn Cyflymder 50 mya) 2010 (WSI 2010 Rhif. 1512 (Cy. 138))
- The M4 Motorway (Rogiet Toll Plaza, Monmouthshire) (50 mph Speed Limit) Regulations 2010 (WSI 2010 No. 1512 (W. 138))
- Rheoliadau Diogelu Iechyd (Gorchmynion Rhan 2A) (Cymru) 2010 (WSI 2010 Rhif. 1544 (Cy. 142))
- The Health Protection (Part 2A Orders) (Wales) Regulations 2010 (WSI 2010 No. 1544 (W. 142))
- Rheoliadau Diogelu Iechyd (Pwerau Awdurdodau Lleol) (Cymru) 2010 (WSI 2010 Rhif. 1545 (Cy. 143))
- The Health Protection (Local Authority Powers) (Wales) Regulations 2010 (WSI 2010 No. 1545 (W. 143))
- Rheoliadau Diogelu Iechyd (Hysbysu) (Cymru) 2010 (WSI 2010 Rhif. 1546 (Cy. 144))
- The Health Protection (Notification) (Wales) Regulations 2010 (WSI 2010 No. 1546 (W. 144))
- Gorchymyn Deddf Iechyd a Gofal Cymdeithasol 2008 (Cychwyn Rhif 4, Darpariaethau Trosiannol ac Arbedion) (Cymru) 2010 (WSI 2010 Rhif. 1547 (Cy. 145) (C. 84))
- The Health and Social Care Act 2008 (Commencement No. 4, Transitional and Savings Provisions) (Wales) Order 2010 (WSI 2010 No. 1547 (W. 145) (C. 84))
- Rheoliadau Cynhyrchion Reis o Unol Daleithiau America (Cyfyngiad ar eu Rhoi Gyntaf ar y Farchnad) (Cymru) (Dirymu) 2010 (WSI 2010 Rhif. 1622 (Cy. 152))
- The Rice Products from the United States of America (Restriction on First Placing on the Market) (Wales) (Revocation) Regulations 2010 (WSI 2010 No. 1622 (W. 152))
- Rheoliadau'r Gwasanaeth Iechyd Gwladol (Diwygiadau Amrywiol ynghylch Rhagnodi Annibynnol) (Cymru) 2010 (WSI 2010 Rhif. 1647 (Cy. 155))
- The National Health Service (Miscellaneous Amendments Relating to Independent Prescribing) (Wales) Regulations 2010 (WSI 2010 No. 1647 (W. 155))
- Rheoliadau'r Gwasanaeth Iechyd Gwladol (Gwasanaethau Fferyllol) (Diwygio) (Cymru) (Rhif 2) 2010 (WSI 2010 Rhif. 1648 (Cy. 156))
- The National Health Service (Pharmaceutical Services) (Amendment) (Wales) (No. 2) Regulations 2010 (WSI 2010 No. 1648 (W. 156))
- Rheoliadau Wyau a Chywion (Cymru) 2010 (WSI 2010 Rhif. 1671 (Cy. 158))
- The Eggs and Chicks (Wales) Regulations 2010 (WSI 2010 No. 1671 (W. 158))
- Rheoliadau Timau Integredig Cymorth i Deuluoedd (Cyfansoddiad Timau a Swyddogaethau Byrddau) (Cymru) 2010 (WSI 2010 Rhif. 1690 (Cy. 159))
- The Integrated Family Support Teams (Composition of Teams and Board Functions) (Wales) Regulations 2010 (WSI 2010 No. 1690 (W. 159))
- Gorchymyn Mesur Plant a Theuluoedd (Cymru) 2010 (Cychwyn) 2010 (WSI 2010 No. 1699 (C. 87) (Cy. 160))
- The Children and Families (Wales) Measure 2010 (Commencement) Order 2010 (WSI 2010 No. 1699 (C. 87) (W. 160))
- Rheoliadau Timau Integredig Cymorth i Deuluoedd (Adolygu Achosion) (Cymru) 2010 (WSI 2010 Rhif. 1700 (Cy. 161))
- The Integrated Family Support Teams (Review of Cases) (Wales) Regulations 2010 (WSI 2010 No. 1700 (W. 161))
- Rheoliadau Timau Integredig Cymorth i Deuluoedd (Swyddogaethau Cymorth i Deuluoedd) (Cymru) 2010 (WSI 2010 Rhif. 1701 (Cy. 162))
- The Integrated Family Support Teams (Family Support Functions) (Wales) Regulations 2010 (WSI 2010 No. 1701 (W. 162))
- Rheoliadau Gwarchod Plant a Gofal Dydd (Anghymhwyso) (Cymru) 2010 (WSI 2010 Rhif. 1703 (Cy. 163))
- The Child Minding and Day Care (Disqualification) (Wales) Regulations 2010 (WSI 2010 No. 1703 (W. 163))
- Rheoliadau Dileu Atebolrwydd dros Fenthyciadau i Fyfyrwyr at Gostau Byw (Cymru) 2010 (WSI 2010 Rhif. 1704 (Cy. 164))
- The Cancellation of Student Loans for Living Costs Liability (Wales) Regulations 2010 (WSI 2010 No. 1704 (W. 164))
- Rheoliadau Deddf Diogelu Grwpiau Hyglwyf 2006 (Cyfnod Rhagnodedig a Swyddog Priodol) (Cymru) (Dirymu) 2010 (WSI 2010 Rhif. 1724 (Cy. 165))
- The Safeguarding Vulnerable Groups Act 2006 (Prescribed Period and Appropriate Officer) (Wales) (Revocation) Regulations 2010 (WSI 2010 No. 1724 (W. 165))
- Gorchymyn Corfforaeth Addysg Bellach Coleg Llysfasi College (Diddymu) 2010 (WSI 2010 Rhif. 1761 (Cy. 166))
- The Coleg Llysfasi College Further Education Corporation (Dissolution) Order 2010 (WSI 2010 No. 1761 (W. 166))
- Gorchymyn Compartmentau Dofednod (Cymru) 2010 (WSI 2010 Rhif. 1780 (Cy. 169))
- The Poultry Compartments (Wales) Order 2010 (WSI 2010 No. 1780 (W. 169))
- Gorchymyn Compartmentau Dofednod (Ffioedd) (Cymru) 2010 (WSI 2010 Rhif. 1781 (Cy. 170))
- The Poultry Compartments (Fees) (Wales) Order 2010 (WSI 2010 No. 1781 (W. 170))
- Rheoliadau Grantiau Dysgu'r Cynulliad (Athrofa Brifysgol Ewropeaidd) (Cymru) (Diwygio) 2010 (WSI 2010 Rhif. 1791 (Cy. 173))
- The Assembly Learning Grants (European University Institute) (Wales) (Amendment) Regulations 2010 (WSI 2010 No. 1791 (W. 173))
- Gorchymyn Iechyd Planhigion (Cymru) (Diwygio) 2010 (WSI 2010 Rhif. 1795 (Cy. 171))
- The Plant Health (Wales) (Amendment) Order 2010 (WSI 2010 No. 1795 (W. 171))
- Rheoliadau Tatws Hadyd (Cymru) (Diwygio) 2010 (WSI 2010 Rhif. 1796 (Cy. 172))
- The Seed Potatoes (Wales) (Amendment) Regulations 2010 (WSI 2010 No. 1796 (W. 172))
- Rheoliadau Grantiau Dysgu'r Cynulliad (Athrofa Brifysgol Ewropeaidd) (Cymru) (Diwygio) 2010 (WSI 2010 Rhif. 1797 (Cy. 173))
- The Assembly Learning Grants (European University Institute) (Wales) (Amendment) Regulations 2010 (WSI 2010 No. 1797 (W. 173))
- Rheoliadau Cynlluniau Cymorthdaliadau a Grantiau Amaethyddol (Apelau) (Cymru) (Diwygio) 2010 (WSI 2010 Rhif. 1807 (Cy. 175))
- The Agricultural Subsidies and Grants Schemes (Appeals) (Wales) (Amendment) Regulations 2010 (WSI 2010 No. 1807 (W. 175))
- Rheoliadau Hadau (Diwygiadau Amrywiol) (Cymru) 2010 (WSI 2010 Rhif. 1808 (Cy. 176))
- The Seed (Miscellaneous Amendments) (Wales) Regulations 2010 (WSI 2010 No. 1808 (W. 176))
- Rheoliadau Sancsiynau Sifil Amgylcheddol (Diwygiadau Amrywiol) (Cymru) 2010 (WSI 2010 Rhif. 1820 (Cy. 177))
- The Environmental Civil Sanctions (Miscellaneous Amendments) (Wales) Regulations 2010 (WSI 2010 No. 1820 (W. 177))
- Gorchymyn Sancsiynau Sifil Amgylcheddol (Cymru) 2010 (WSI 2010 Rhif. 1821 (Cy. 178))
- The Environmental Civil Sanctions (Wales) Order 2010 (WSI 2010 No. 1821 (W. 178))
- Rheoliadau Enseffalopathïau Sbyngffurf Trosglwyddadwy (Cymru) (Diwygio) 2010 (WSI 2010 Rhif. 1822 (Cy. 179))
- The Transmissible Spongiform Encephalopathies (Wales) (Amendment) Regulations 2010 (WSI 2010 No. 1822 (W. 179))
- Rheoliadau Honiadau am Faethiad ac Iechyd (Cymru) (Diwygio) 2010 (WSI 2010 Rhif. 1849 (Cy. 180))
- The Nutrition and Health Claims (Wales) (Amendment) Regulations 2010 (WSI 2010 No. 1849 (W. 180))
- Gorchymyn Corfforaeth Addysg Bellach Coleg Gorseinion a Chorfforaeth Addysg Bellach Coleg Abertawe (Diddymu) 2010 (WSI 2010 Rhif. 1876 (Cy. 181))
- The Gorseinion College Further Education Corporation and Swansea College Further Education Corporation (Dissolution) Order 2010 (WSI 2010 No. 1876 (W. 181))
- Gorchymyn Awdurdod Iechyd Porthladd Bae Abertawe (Diwygio) 2010 (WSI 2010 Rhif. 1884 (Cy. 182))
- The Swansea Bay Port Health Authority (Amendment) Order 2010 (WSI 2010 No. 1884 (W. 182))
- Gorchymyn Awdurdod Iechyd Porthladd Aberdaugleddau (Diwygio) 2010 (WSI 2010 Rhif. 1885 (Cy. 183))
- The Milford Port Health Authority (Amendment) Order 2010 (WSI 2010 No. 1885 (W. 183))
- Rheoliadau Milheintiau a Sgil-gynhyrchion Anifeiliaid (Ffioedd) (Cymru) (Diwygio) 2010 (WSI 2010 Rhif. 1890 (Cy. 184))
- The Zoonoses and Animal By-Products (Fees) (Wales) (Amendment) Regulations 2010 (WSI 2010 No. 1890 (W. 184))
- Rheoliadau Cynllun Taliad Sengl a Chynlluniau Cymorth y Polisi Amaethyddol Cyffredin (Cymru) 2010 (WSI 2010 Rhif. 1892 (Cy. 185))
- The Common Agricultural Policy Single Payment and Support Schemes (Wales) Regulations 2010 (WSI 2010 No. 1892 (W. 185))
- Rheoliadau Addysg (Cofrestru Disgyblion) (Cymru) 2010 (WSI 2010 Rhif. 1954 (Cy. 187))
- The Education (Pupil Registration) (Wales) Regulations 2010 (WSI 2010 No. 1954 (W. 187))
- Gorchymyn Deddf Cynllunio a Phrynu Gorfodol 2004 (Cychwyn Rhif 4 a Darpariaethau Canlyniadol a Throsiannol a Darpariaethau Arbed) (Cymru) (Diwygio Rhif 1) 2010 (WSI 2010 Rhif. 2002 (Cy. 188) (C. 106))
- The Planning and Compulsory Purchase Act 2004 (Commencement No. 4 and Consequential, Transitional and Savings Provisions) (Wales) (Amendment No. 1) Order 2010 (WSI 2010 No. 2002 (W. 188) (C. 106))
- Rheolau Pridiannau Tir Lleol (Diwygio) (Cymru) 2010 (WSI 2010 Rhif. 2021 (Cy. 189))
- The Local Land Charges (Amendment) (Wales) Rules 2010 (WSI 2010 No. 2021 (W. 189))
- Rheoliadau Ychwanegu Fitaminau, Mwynau a Sylweddau Eraill (Cymru) (Diwygio) 2010 (WSI 2010 Rhif. 2069 (Cy. 191))
- The Addition of Vitamins, Minerals and Other Substances (Wales) (Amendment) Regulations 2010 (WSI 2010 No. 2069 (W. 191))
- Gorchymyn Rheilffordd Llangollen a Chorwen 2010 (WSI 2010 Rhif. 2136 (Cy. 192))
- The Llangollen and Corwen Railway Order 2010 (WSI 2010 No. 2136 (W. 192))
- Rheoliadau Deddf Cydraddoldeb 2010 (Rheoleiddiwr Cyrff Cymwysterau Cyffredinol a Chymwysterau Perthnasol) (Cymru) 2010 (WSI 2010 Rhif. 2217 (Cy. 193))
- The Equality Act 2010 (General Qualifications Bodies Regulator and Relevant Qualifications) (Wales) Regulations 2010 (WSI 2010 No. 2217 (W. 193))
- Rheoliadau Ardrethu Annomestig (Casglu a Gorfodi) (Rhestrau Lleol) (Diwygio) (Cymru) 2010 (WSI 2010 Rhif. 2222 (Cy. 194))
- The Non-Domestic Rating (Collection and Enforcement) (Local Lists) (Amendment) (Wales) Regulations 2010 (WSI 2010 No. 2222 (W. 194))
- Gorchymyn Ardrethu Annomestig (Rhyddhad Ardrethi i Fusnesau Bach) (Cymru) (Diwygio) (Rhif 2) 2010 (WSI 2010 Rhif. 2223 (Cy. 195))
- The Non-Domestic Rating (Small Business Relief) (Wales) (Amendment) (No. 2) Order 2010 (WSI 2010 No. 2223 (W. 195))
- Gorchymyn Mesur Llywodraeth Leol (Cymru) 2009 (Cychwyn Rhif 2, Darpariaethau Trosiannol ac Arbedion) (Diwygio) 2010 (WSI 2010 No. 2237 (C. 111) (Cy. 196))
- The Local Government (Wales) Measure 2009 (Commencement No. 2, Transitional Provisions and Savings) (Amendment) Order 2010 (WSI 2010 No. 2237 (C. 111) (W. 196))
- Rheoliadau Bwyd Anifeiliaid (Samplu a Dadansoddi a Sylweddau Annymunol Penodedig) (Cymru) 2010 (WSI 2010 Rhif. 2287 (Cy. 199))
- The Feed (Sampling and Analysis and Specified Undesirable Substances) (Wales) Regulations 2010 (WSI 2010 No. 2287 (W. 199))
- Rheoliadau Deunyddiau ac Eitemau mewn Cysylltiad â Bwyd (Cymru) 2010 (WSI 2010 Rhif. 2288 (Cy. 200))
- The Materials and Articles in Contact with Food (Wales) Regulations 2010 (WSI 2010 No. 2288 (W. 200))

== 201-300 ==
- Rheoliadau Arbelydru Bwyd (Cymru) (Diwygio) 2010 (WSI 2010 Rhif. 2289 (Cy. 201))
- The Food Irradiation (Wales) (Amendment) Regulations 2010 (WSI 2010 No. 2289 (W. 201))
- Cynllun Cychod Pysgota (Darlledu Data Gweithgareddau Pysgota yn Electronig) (Cymru) 2010 (WSI 2010 Rhif. 2369 (Cy. 203))
- The Fishing Boats (Electronic Transmission of Fishing Activities Data) (Wales) Scheme 2010 (WSI 2010 No. 2369 (W. 203))
- Rheoliadau Halogion mewn Bwyd (Cymru) 2010 (WSI 2010 Rhif. 2394 (Cy. 206))
- The Contaminants in Food (Wales) Regulations 2010 (WSI 2010 No. 2394 (W. 206))
- Gorchymyn Deddf Prentisiaethau, Sgiliau, Plant a Dysgu 2009 (Cychwyn Rhif 2 a Darpariaethau Trosiannol) (Cymru) 2010 (WSI 2010 Rhif. 2413 (Cy. 207) (C. 118))
- The Apprenticeships, Skills, Children and Learning Act 2009 (Commencement No. 2 and Transitional Provisions) (Wales) Order 2010 (WSI 2010 No. 2413 (W. 207) (C. 118))
- Gorchymyn Deddf Lleihau Troseddu Treisgar 2006 (Cychwyn Rhif 1) (Cymru) 2010 (WSI 2010 No. 2426 (C. 119) (Cy. 208))
- The Violent Crime Reduction Act 2006 (Commencement No. 1) (Wales) Order 2010 (WSI 2010 No. 2426 (C. 119) (W. 208))
- Rheoliadau Deddf Prentisiaethau, Sgiliau, Plant a Dysgu 2009 (Diwygiadau Canlyniadol) (Cymru) 2010 (WSI 2010 Rhif. 2431 (Cy. 209))
- The Apprenticeships, Skills, Children and Learning Act 2009 (Consequential Amendments) (Wales) Regulations 2010 (WSI 2010 No. 2431 (W. 209))
- Gorchymyn Cymeradwyo Trapiau Sbring (Cymru) 2010 (WSI 2010 Rhif. 2447 (Cy. 210))
- The Spring Traps Approval (Wales) Order 2010 (WSI 2010 No. 2447 (W. 210))
- Gorchymyn y Dreth Gyngor (Diystyru Gostyngiadau) (Diwygio) (Cymru) 2010 (WSI 2010 Rhif. 2448 (Cy. 211))
- The Council Tax (Discount Disregards) (Amendment) (Wales) Order 2010 (WSI 2010 No. 2448 (W. 211))
- Gorchymyn Deddf Addysg ac Arolygiadau 2006 (Cychwyn Rhif 6) (Cymru) 2010 (WSI 2010 No. 2543 (C. 122) (Cy. 212))
- The Education and Inspections Act 2006 (Commencement No. 6) (Wales) Order 2010 (WSI 2010 No. 2543 (C. 122) (W. 212))
- Rheoliadau Gwarchod Plant a Gofal Dydd (Cymru) 2010 (WSI 2010 Rhif. 2574 (Cy. 214))
- The Child Minding and Day Care (Wales) Regulations 2010 (WSI 2010 No. 2574 (W. 214))
- Rheoliadau Gwarchod Plant a Gofal Dydd (Arolygu a Gwybodaeth ar gyfer Awdurdodau Lleol)(Cymru) 2010 (WSI 2010 Rhif. 2575 (Cy. 215))
- The Child Minding and Day Care (Inspection and Information for Local Authorities) (Wales) Regulations 2010 (WSI 2010 No. 2575 (W. 215))
- Gorchymyn Mesur Plant a Theuluoedd (Cymru) 2010 (Cychwyn Rhif 2, Arbedion a Darpariaethau Trosiannol) 2010 (WSI 2010 No. 2582 (C. 123) (Cy. 216))
- The Children and Families (Wales) Measure 2010 (Commencement No. 2, Savings and Transitional Provisions) Order 2010 (WSI 2010 No. 2582 (C. 123) (W. 216))
- Rheoliadau Cynlluniau Lleoli Oedolion (Cymru) (Diwygiadau Amrywiol) 2010 (WSI 2010 Rhif. 2585 (Cy. 217))
- The Adult Placement Schemes (Wales) (Miscellaneous Amendments) Regulations 2010 (WSI 2010 No. 2585 (W. 217))
- Rheoliadau Traffordd yr M4 (Cyffordd 41, Slipffordd Ymadael tua'r Gorllewin, Cylchfan Sunnycroft, Baglan, Castell-nedd Port Talbot) (Terfyn Cyflymder 50 MYA) 2010 (WSI 2010 Rhif. 2623 (Cy. 218))
- The M4 Motorway (Junction 41, Westbound Exit Slip Road, Sunnycroft Roundabout, Baglan, Neath Port Talbot) (50 MPH Speed Limit) Regulations 2010 (WSI 2010 No. 2623 (W. 218))
- Rheoliadau Deunyddiau Bwyd sy'n Addas i Bobl ag Anoddefiad tuag at Glwten (Cymru) 2010 (WSI 2010 Rhif. 2651 (Cy. 219))
- The Foodstuffs Suitable for People Intolerant to Gluten (Wales) Regulations 2010 (WSI 2010 No. 2651 (W. 219))
- Rheoliadau Bwyd Anifeiliaid (Cymru) 2010 (WSI 2010 Rhif. 2652 (Cy. 220))
- The Animal Feed (Wales) Regulations 2010 (WSI 2010 No. 2652 (W. 220))
- Rheoliadau Gorchmynion Traffig Awdurdodau Lleol (Gweithdrefn) (Cymru a Lloegr) (Diwygio) (Cymru) 2010 (WSI 2010 Rhif. 2657 (Cy. 222))
- The Local Authorities' Traffic Orders (Procedure) (England and Wales) (Amendment) (Wales) Regulations 2010 (WSI 2010 No. 2657 (W. 222))
- Rheoliadau Addysg (Gwaith Penodedig a Chofrestru) (Cymru) 2010 (WSI 2010 Rhif. 2710 (Cy. 227))
- The Education (Specified Work and Registration) (Wales) Regulations 2010 (WSI 2010 No. 2710 (W. 227))
- Rheoliadau Anffurfio (Triniaethau a Ganiateir) (Cymru) (Diwygio) 2010 (WSI 2010 Rhif. 2712 (Cy. 228))
- The Mutilations (Permitted Procedures) (Wales) (Amendment) Regulations 2010 (WSI 2010 No. 2712 (W. 228))
- Rheoliadau Lles Anifeiliaid a Ffermir (Cymru) (Diwygio) 2010 (WSI 2010 Rhif. 2713 (Cy. 229))
- The Welfare of Farmed Animals (Wales) (Amendment) Regulations 2010 (WSI 2010 No. 2713 (W. 229))
- Rheoliadau'r Gwasanaeth Iechyd Gwladol (Treuliau Teithio a Pheidio â Chodi Tâl) (Cymru) (Diwygio) (Rhif 2) 2010 (WSI 2010 Rhif. 2759 (Cy. 231))
- The National Health Service (Travelling Expenses and Remission of Charges) (Wales) (Amendment) (No.2) Regulations 2010 (WSI 2010 No. 2759 (W. 231))
- Gorchymyn Daliadau Amaethyddol (Unedau Cynhyrchu) (Cymru) 2010 (WSI 2010 Rhif. 2825 (Cy. 232))
- The Agricultural Holdings (Units of Production) (Wales) Order 2010 (WSI 2010 No. 2825 (W. 232))
- Gorchymyn Eithriadau Gwarchod Plant a Gofal Dydd (Cymru) 2010 (WSI 2010 Rhif. 2839 (Cy. 233))
- The Child Minding and Day Care Exceptions (Wales) Order 2010 (WSI 2010 No. 2839 (W. 233))
- Rheoliadau Byrddau Iechyd Lleol (Ymgynghori â Phwyllgorau Deintyddol Lleol) (Cymru) 2010 (WSI 2010 Rhif. 2846 (Cy. 234))
- The Local Health Boards (Consultation with Local Dental Committees) (Wales) Regulations 2010 (WSI 2010 No. 2846 (W. 234))
- The Audit and Assessment Reports (Wales) Order 2010 (WSI 2010 No. 2853 (W. 235))
- Rheoliadau Codi Tâl am Fagiau Siopa Untro (Cymru) 2010 (WSI 2010 Rhif. 2880 (Cy. 238))
- The Single Use Carrier Bags Charge (Wales) Regulations 2010 (WSI 2010 No. 2880 (W. 238))
- Rheoliadau Cyfraniadau Ardrethu Annomestig (Cymru) (Diwygio) 2010 (WSI 2010 Rhif. 2889 (Cy. 239))
- The Non-Domestic Rating Contributions (Wales) (Amendment) Regulations 2010 (WSI 2010 No. 2889 (W. 239))
- Gorchymyn Pysgod Môr (Ardal Benodedig) (Gwahardd Offer Gosod) (Cymru) 2010 (WSI 2010 Rhif. 2915 (Cy. 240))
- The Sea Fish (Specified Area) (Prohibition of Fixed Engines) (Wales) Order 2010 (WSI 2010 No. 2915 (W. 240))
- Gorchymyn Deddf y Môr a Mynediad i'r Arfordir 2009 (Darpariaethau Canlyniadol) (Cymru) (Rhif 2) 2010 (WSI 2010 Rhif. 2916 (Cy. 241))
- The Marine and Coastal Access Act 2009 (Consequential Provisions) (Wales) (No. 2) Order 2010 (WSI 2010 No. 2916 (W. 241))
- Rheoliadau Iechyd Planhigion (Ffioedd Arolygu Mewnforio) (Cymru) 2010 (WSI 2010 Rhif. 2917 (Cy. 242))
- The Plant Health (Import Inspection Fees) (Wales) Regulations 2010 (WSI 2010 No. 2917 (W. 242))
- Rheoliadau Cyflasynnau mewn Bwyd (Cymru) 2010 (WSI 2010 Rhif. 2922 (Cy. 243))
- The Flavourings in Food (Wales) Regulations 2010 (WSI 2010 No. 2922 (W. 243))
- Gorchymyn Dynodi Gorfodi Sifil ar Dramgwyddau Parcio (Sir Benfro) 2010 (WSI 2010 Rhif. 2945 (Cy. 244))
- The Civil Enforcement of Parking Contraventions (County of Pembrokeshire) Designation Order 2010 (WSI 2010 No. 2945 (W. 244))
- Rheoliadau Addysg (Cyfweliad Ailintegreiddio) (Cymru) 2010 (WSI 2010 Rhif. 2953 (Cy. 245))
- The Education (Reintegration Interview) (Wales) Regulations 2010 (WSI 2010 No. 2953 (W. 245))
- Rheoliadau Addysg (Contractau Rhianta a Gorchmynion Rhianta) (Cymru) 2010 (WSI 2010 Rhif. 2954 (Cy. 246))
- The Education (Parenting Contracts and Parenting Orders) (Wales) Regulations 2010 (WSI 2010 No. 2954 (W. 246))
- Gorchymyn Iechyd Planhigion (Cymru) (Diwygio) (Rhif 2) 2010 (WSI 2010 Rhif. 2976 (Cy. 247))
- The Plant Health (Wales) (Amendment) (No. 2) Order 2010 (WSI 2010 No. 2976 (W. 247))
- Gorchymyn Mesur Plant a Theuluoedd (Cymru) 2010 (Cychwyn Rhif 3 a Darpariaeth Arbedion) 2010 (WSI 2010 No. 2994 (C. 134) (Cy. 248))
- The Children and Families (Wales) Measure 2010 (Commencement No. 3 and Savings Provision) Order 2010 (WSI 2010 No. 2994 (C. 134) (W. 248))
- Gorchymyn Refferendwm Cynulliad Cenedlaethol Cymru (Darpariaethau Deddfau'r Cynulliad) (Taliadau Swyddogion Cyfrif) 2010 (WSI 2010 Rhif. 3000 (Cy. 249))
- The National Assembly for Wales Referendum (Assembly Act Provisions) (Counting Officers' Charges) Order 2010 (WSI 2010 No. 3000 (W. 249))
