= List of Welsh statutory instruments, 2007 =

This is an incomplete list of Welsh statutory instruments made in 2007. Statutory instruments made by the Assembly are numbered in the main United Kingdom series with their own sub-series. The Welsh language has official equal status with the English language in Wales, so every statutory instrument made by the Assembly is officially published in both English and Welsh. Only the titles of the English-language version are reproduced here. The statutory instruments are secondary legislation, deriving their power from the acts of Parliament establishing and transferring functions and powers to the Welsh Assembly.

== 1-100 ==
- The Food for Particular Nutritional Uses (Addition of Substances for Specific Nutritional Purposes) (Wales) (Amendment) Regulations 2007 (S.I. 2007 No. 116 (W.7))
- Rheoliadau Bwyd at Ddefnydd Maethol Neilltuol (Ychwanegu Sylweddau at Ddibenion Maethol Penodol) (Cymru) (Diwygio) 2007 (S.I. 2007 Rhif 116 (Cy.7))
- The Statutory Nuisances (Miscellaneous Provisions) (Wales) Regulations 2007 (S.I. 2007 No. 117 (W.8))
- Rheoliadau Niwsansau Statudol (Darpariaethau Amrywiol) (Cymru) 2007 (S.I. 2007 Rhif 117 (Cy.8))
- The Seed (Wales) (Amendments for Tests and Trials etc.) Regulations 2007 (S.I. 2007 No. 119 (W.9))
- Rheoliadau Hadau (Cymru) (Diwygiadau ar gyfer Cynnal Profion a Threialu etc.) 2007 (S.I. 2007 Rhif 119 (Cy.9))
- The Statutory Nuisances (Miscellaneous Provisions) (Wales) Order 2007 (S.I. 2007 No. 120 (W.10))
- Gorchymyn Niwsansau Statudol (Darpariaethau Amrywiol) (Cymru) 2007 (S.I. 2007 Rhif 120 (Cy.10))
- National Health Service (Free Prescriptions and Charges for Drugs and Appliances) (Wales) Regulations 2007 (S.I. 2007 No. 121 (W.11))
- Rheoliadau'r Gwasanaeth Iechyd Gwladol (Presgripsiynau am Ddim a Ffioedd am Gyffuriau a Chyfarpar) (Cymru) 2007 (S.I. 2007 Rhif 121 (Cy.11))
- National Health Service (General Ophthalmic Services) (Amendment) (Wales) Regulations 2007 (S.I. 2007 No. 122 (W.12))
- Rheoliadau'r Gwasanaeth Iechyd Gwladol (Gwasanaethau Offthalmig Cyffredinol) (Diwygio) (Cymru) 2007 (S.I. 2007 Rhif 122 (Cy.12))
- The Official Controls (Animals, Feed and Food) (Wales) Regulations 2007 (S.I. 2007 No. 196 (W.15))
- Rheoliadau Rheolaethau Swyddogol (Anifeiliaid, Bwyd Anifeiliaid a Bwyd) (Cymru) 2007 (S.I. 2007 Rhif 196 (Cy.15))
- The Environmental Impact Assessment (Uncultivated Land and Semi-natural Areas) (Wales) (Amendment) Regulations 2007 (S.I. 2007 No. 203 (W.17))
- Rheoliadau Asesu Effeithiau Amgylcheddol (Tir heb ei Drin ac Ardaloedd Lled-naturiol) (Cymru) (Diwygio) 2007 (S.I. 2007 Rhif 203 (Cy.17))
- The Health Act 2006 (Commencement No. 1 and Transitional Provisions) (Wales) Order 2007 (S.I. 2007 No. 204 (W.18) (C.9))
- Gorchymyn Deddf Iechyd 2006 (Cychwyn Rhif 1 a Darpariaethau Trosiannol) (Cymru) 2007 (S.I. 2007 Rhif 204 (Cy.18) (C.9))
- The National Health Service (Miscellaneous Amendments Concerning Independent Nurse Prescribers, Supplementary Prescribers, Nurse Independent Prescribers and Pharmacist Independent Prescribers) (Wales) Regulations 2007 (S.I. 2007 No. 205 (W.19))
- Rheoliadau'r Gwasanaeth Iechyd Gwladol (Diwygiadau Amrywiol Ynghylch Nyrsys Sy'n Rhagnodi'n Annibynnol, Rhagnodwyr Atodol, Nyrsys-ragnodwyr Annibynnol a Fferyllwyr-ragnodwyr Annibynnol) (Cymru) 2007 (S.I. 2007 Rhif 205 (Cy.19))
- Tax Credits (Approval of Child Care Providers) (Wales) Scheme 2007 (S.I. 2007 No. 226 (W.20))
- Y Cynllun Credydau Treth (Cymeradwyo Darparwyr Gofal Plant) (Cymru) 2007 (S.I. 2007 Rhif 226 (Cy.20))
- The Housing Act 2004 (Commencement No. 4) (Wales) Order 2007 (S.I. 2007 No. 305 (W.24) (C.12))
- Gorchymyn Deddf Tai 2004 (Cychwyn Rhif 4) (Cymru) 2007 (S.I. 2007 Rhif 305 (Cy.24) (C.12))
- The Highways Act 1980 (Gating Orders) (Wales) Regulations 2007 (S.I. 2007 No. 306 (W.25))
- Rheoliadau Deddf Priffyrdd 1980 (Gorchmynion Gatio) (Cymru) 2007 (S.I. 2007 Rhif 306 (Cy.25))
- The Review of Children’s Cases (Wales) Regulations 2007 (S.I. 2007 No. 307 (W.26))
- Rheoliadau Adolygu Achosion Plant (Cymru) 2007 (S.I. 2007 Rhif 307 (Cy.26))
- The Placement of Children (Wales) Regulations 2007 (S.I. 2007 No. 310 (W.27))
- Rheoliadau Lleoli Plant (Cymru) 2007 (S.I. 2007 Rhif 310 (Cy.27))
- The Children’s Homes (Wales) (Miscellaneous Amendments) Regulations 2007 (S.I. 2007 No. 311 (W.28))
- Rheoliadau Cartrefi Plant (Cymru) (Diwygiadau Amrywiol) 2007 (S.I. 2007 Rhif 311 (Cy.28))
- Local Health Boards (Functions) (Wales) (Amendment) Regulations 2007 (S.I. 2007 No. 315 (W.29))
- Rheoliadau'r Byrddau Iechyd Lleol (Swyddogaethau) (Cymru) (Diwygio) 2007 (S.I. 2007 Rhif 315 (Cy.29))
- The Children’s Commissioner for Wales (Amendment) Regulations 2007 (S.I. 2007 No. 316 (W.30))
- Rheoliadau Comisiynydd Plant Cymru (Diwygio) 2007 (S.I. 2007 Rhif 316 (Cy.30))
- The Food Hygiene (Wales) (Amendment) Regulations 2007 (S.I. 2007 No. 373 (W.33))
- Rheoliadau Hylendid Bwyd (Cymru) (Diwygio) 2007 (S.I. 2007 Rhif 373 (Cy.33))
- The National Assembly for Wales (Date of First Meeting of the Assembly Constituted by the Government of Wales Act 2006) Order 2007 (S.I. 2007 No. 374 (W.34))
- Gorchymyn Cynulliad Cenedlaethol Cymru (Dyddiad Cyfarfod Cyntaf y Cynulliad sydd wedi ei Gyfansoddi yn ôl Deddf Llywodraeth Cymru 2006) 2007 (S.I. 2007 Rhif 374 (Cy.34))
- The Home Energy Efficiency Schemes (Wales) Regulations 2007 (S.I. 2007 No. 375 (W.35))
- Rheoliadau Cynlluniau Effeithlonrwydd Ynni Cartref (Cymru) 2007 (S.I. 2007 Rhif 375 (Cy.35))
- The Products of Animal Origin (Third Country Imports) (Wales) Regulations 2007 (S.I. 2007 No. 376 (W.36))
- Rheoliadau Cynhyrchion sy'n Dod o Anifeiliaid (Mewnforion Trydydd Gwledydd) (Cymru) 2007 (S.I. 2007 Rhif 376 (Cy.36))
- Accounts and Audit (Wales) (Amendment) Regulations 2007 (S.I. 2007 No. 388 (W.39))
- Rheoliadau Cyfrifon ac Archwilio (Cymru) (Diwygio) 2007 (S.I. 2007 Rhif 388 (Cy.39))
- The Quick-frozen Foodstuffs (Wales) Regulations 2007 (S.I. 2007 No. 389 (W.40))
- Rheoliadau Deunyddiau Bwyd sydd wedi'u Rhewi'n Gyflym (Cymru) 2007 (S.I. 2007 Rhif 389 (Cy.40))
- The Agricultural Wages Committee (Wales) Order 2007 (S.I. 2007 No. 395 (W.41))
- Gorchymyn y Pwyllgor Cyflogau Amaethyddol (Cymru) 2007 (S.I. 2007 Rhif 395 (Cy.41))
- The Commissioner for Older People in Wales (Appointment) Regulations 2007 (S.I. 2007 No. 396 (W.42))
- Rheoliadau Comisiynydd Pobl Hŷn Cymru (Penodi) 2007 (S.I. 2007 Rhif 396 (Cy.42))
- The Local Authorities (Alternative Arrangements) (Wales) Regulations 2007 (S.I. 2007 No. 397 (W.43))
- Rheoliadau Awdurdodau Lleol (Trefniadau Amgen) (Cymru) 2007 (S.I. 2007 Rhif 397 (Cy.43))
- The Commissioner for Older People in Wales Regulations 2007 (S.I. 2007 No. 398 (W.44))
- Rheoliadau Comisiynydd Pobl Hyn Cymru 2007 (S.I. 2007 Rhif 398 (Cy.44))
- The Local Authorities (Executive Arrangements) (Functions and Responsibilities) (Wales) Regulations 2007 (S.I. 2007 No. 399 (W.45))
- Rheoliadau Awdurdodau Lleol (Trefniadau Gweithrediaeth) (Swyddogaethau a Chyfrifoldebau) (Cymru) 2007 (S.I. 2007 Rhif 399 (Cy.45))
- The Planning and Compulsory Purchase Act 2004 (Commencement No.4 and Consequential, Transitional and Savings Provisions) (Wales) (Amendment No.1) Order 2007 (S.I. 2007 No. 546 (W.48))
- Gorchymyn Deddf Cynllunio a Phrynu Gorfodol 2004 (Cychwyn Rhif 4 a Darpariaethau Canlyniadol a Throsiannol a Darpariaethau Arbed) (Cymru) (Diwygio Rhif 1) 2007 (S.I. 2007 Rhif 546 (Cy.48))
- The Local Authorities (Alteration of Requisite Calculations) (Wales) Regulations 2007 (S.I. 2007 No. 571 (W.49))
- Rheoliadau Awdurdodau Lleol (Addasu Cyfrifiadau Angenrheidiol) (Cymru) 2007 (S.I. 2007 Rhif 571 (Cy.49))
- Approval of Code of Practice (Private Retirement Housing) (Wales) Order 2007 (S.I. 2007 No. 578 (W.50))
- Gorchymyn Cymeradwyo Cod Ymarfer (Tai Ymddeol Preifat) (Cymru) 2007 (S.I. 2007 Rhif 578 (Cy.50))
- The Colours in Food (Amendment) (Wales) Regulations 2007 (S.I. 2007 No. 579 (W.51))
- Rheoliadau Lliwiau mewn Bwyd (Diwygio) (Cymru) 2007 (S.I. 2007 Rhif 579 (Cy.51))
- The Council Tax (Discount Disregards) (Amendment) (Wales) Order 2007 (S.I. 2007 No. 580 (W.52))
- Gorchymyn y Dreth Gyngor (Diystyru Disgownt) (Diwygio) (Cymru) 2007 (S.I. 2007 Rhif 580 (Cy.52))
- Council Tax (Additional Provisions for Discount Disregards) (Amendment) (Wales) Regulations 2007 (S.I. 2007 No. 581 (W. 53))
- Rheoliadau'r Dreth Gyngor (Darpariaethau Ychwanegol ar gyfer Diystyru Disgownt) (Diwygio) (Cymru) 2007 (S.I. 2007 Rhif 581 (Cy. 53))
- The Council Tax (Administration and Enforcement) (Amendment) (Wales) Regulations 2007 (S.I. 2007 No. 582 (W.54))
- Rheoliadau'r Dreth Gyngor (Gweinyddu a Gorfodi) (Diwygio) (Cymru) 2007 (S.I. 2007 Rhif 582 (Cy.54))
- The Commons (Severance of Rights) (Wales) Order 2007 (S.I. 2007 No. 583 (W.55))
- Gorchymyn Tiroedd Comin (Hollti Hawliau) (Cymru) 2007 (S.I. 2007 Rhif 583 (Cy.55))
- The Curd Cheese (Restriction on Placing on the Market) (Wales) (Revocation) Regulations 2007 (S.I. 2007 No. 692 (W.57))
- The Controls on Dogs (Non-application to Designated Land) (Wales) Order 2007 (S.I. 2007 No. 701 (W.58))
- Gorchymyn Rheolaethau ar Gŵ n (Heb Fod yn Gymwys i Dir Dynodedig) (Cymru) 2007 (S.I. 2007 Rhif 701 (Cy.58))
- The Dog Control Orders (Miscellaneous Provisions) (Wales) Regulations 2007 (S.I. 2007 No. 702 (W.59))
- Rheoliadau Gorchmynion Rheoli <?amendment type=start time=1247656319663?>Cŵn<?amendment type=end time=1247656319663?> (Darpariaethau Amrywiol) (Cymru) 2007 (S.I. 2007 Rhif 702 (Cy.59))
- The Road Traffic (Permitted Parking Area and Special Parking Area) (County of Gwynedd) Order 2007 (S.I. 2007 No. 714 (W.62))
- Gorchymyn Traffig Ffyrdd (Ardal Barcio a Ganiateir ac Ardal Barcio Arbennig) (Sir Gwynedd) 2007 (S.I. 2007 Rhif 714 (Cy.62))
- The Air Quality Standards (Wales) Regulations 2007 (S.I. 2007 No. 717 (W.63))
- Rheoliadau Safonau Ansawdd Aer (Cymru) 2007 (S.I. 2007 Rhif 717 (Cy.63))
- The Local Inquiries, Qualifying Inquiries and Qualifying Procedures (Standard Daily Amount) (Wales) Regulations 2007 (S.I. 2007 No. 728 (W.64))
- Rheoliadau Ymchwiliadau Lleol, Ymchwiliadau Cymwys a Gweithdrefnau Cymwys (Swm Dyddiol Safonol) (Cymru) 2007 (S.I. 2007 Rhif 728 (Cy.64))
- Children and Adoption Act 2006 (Commencement No. 1) (Wales) Order 2007 (S.I. 2007 No. 733 (W.65) (C.31))
- Gorchymyn Deddf Plant a Mabwysiadu 2006 (Cychwyn Rhif 1) (Cymru) 2007 (S.I. 2007 Rhif 733 (Cy.65) (C.31))
- The Children (Performances) (Amendment)(Wales) Regulations 2007 (S.I. 2007 No. 736 (W.66))
- Rheoliadau Plant (Perfformiadau) (Diwygio) (Cymru) 2007 (S.I. 2007 Rhif 736 (Cy.66))
- The Environmental Offences (Fixed Penalties) (Miscellaneous Provisions) (Wales) Regulations 2007 (S.I. 2007 No. 739 (W.67))
- Rheoliadau Tramgwyddau Amgylcheddol (Cosbau Penodedig) (Darpariaethau Amrywiol) (Cymru) 2007 (S.I. 2007 Rhif 739 (Cy.67))
- The Smoke-free Premises etc. (Wales) Regulations 2007 (S.I. 2007 No. 787 (W.68))
- Rheoliadau Mangreoedd etc. Di-fwg (Cymru) 2007 (S.I. 2007 Rhif 787 (Cy.68))
- The General Teaching Council for Wales (Constitution) (Amendment) Regulations 2007 (S.I. 2007 No. 812 (W.69))
- Rheoliadau Cyngor Addysgu Cyffredinol Cymru (Cyfansoddiad) (Diwygio) 2007 (S.I. 2007 Rhif 812 (Cy.69))
- The Mental Capacity Act 2005 (Appropriate Body) (Wales) Regulations 2007 (S.I. 2007 No. 833 (W.71))
- Rheoliadau Deddf Galluedd Meddyliol 2005 (Corff Priodol) (Cymru) 2007 (S.I. 2007 Rhif 833 (Cy.71))
- The Mental Capacity Act 2005 (Loss of Capacity during Research Project) (Wales) Regulations 2007 (S.I. 2007 No. 837 (W.72))
- Rheoliadau Deddf Galluedd Meddyliol 2005 (Colli Galluedd yn ystod Prosiect Ymchwil) (Cymru) 2007 (S.I. 2007 Rhif 837 (Cy.72))
- The Contaminants in Food (Wales) Regulations 2007 (S.I. 2007 No. 840 (W.73))
- Rheoliadau Halogion mewn Bwyd (Cymru) 2007 (S.I. 2007 Rhif 840 (Cy.73))
- The Cattle Identification (Wales) Regulations 2007 (S.I. 2007 No. 842 (W.74))
- Rheoliadau Adnabod Gwartheg (Cymru) 2007 (S.I. 2007 Rhif 842 (Cy.74))
- The Meat (Official Controls Charges) (Wales) Regulations 2007 (S.I. 2007 No. 843 (W.75))
- Rheoliadau Cig (Ffioedd Rheolaethau Swyddogol) (Cymru) 2007 (S.I. 2007 Rhif 843 (Cy.75))
- The Dairy Produce Quotas (Wales) (Amendment) Regulations 2007 (S.I. 2007 No. 844 (W.76))
- Rheoliadau Cwotâu Cynnyrch Llaeth (Cymru) (Diwygio) 2007 (S.I. 2007 Rhif 844 (Cy.76))
- The Mental Capacity Act 2005 (Independent Mental Capacity Advocates) (Wales) Regulations 2007 (S.I. 2007 No. 852 (W.77))
- Rheoliadau Deddf Galluedd Meddyliol 2005 (Eiriolwyr Annibynnol o ran Galluedd Meddyliol) (Cymru) 2007 (S.I. 2007 Rhif 852 (Cy.77))
- The Further Education Corporations (Publication of Draft Orders) (Wales) Regulations 2007 (S.I. 2007 No. 854 (W.78))
- Rheoliadau Corfforaethau Addysg Bellach (Cyhoeddi Gorchmynion Drafft) (Cymru) 2007 (S.I. 2007 Rhif 854 (Cy.78))
- Mental Capacity Act 2005 (Commencement) (Wales) Order 2007 (S.I. 2007 No. 856 (W.79) (C.34))
- Gorchymyn Deddf Galluedd Meddyliol 2005 (Cychwyn) (Cymru) 2007 (S.I. 2007 Rhif 856 (Cy.79) (C.34))
- The Staffing of Maintained Schools (Miscellaneous Amendments) (Wales) Regulations 2007 (S.I. 2007 No. 944 (W.80))
- Rheoliadau Staffio Ysgolion a Gynhelir (Diwygiadau Amrywiol) (Cymru) 2007 (S.I. 2007 Rhif 944 (Cy.80))
- The Independent Schools (Miscellaneous Amendments) (Wales) Regulations 2007 (S.I. 2007 No. 947 (W.81))
- Rheoliadau Ysgolion Annibynnol (Diwygiadau Amrywiol) (Cymru) 2007 (S.I. 2007 Rhif 947 (Cy.81))
- The Local Authorities (Executive Arrangements) (Decisions, Documents and Meetings) and the Standards Committees (Wales) (Amendment) Regulations 2007 (S.I. 2007 No. 951 (W.82))
- Rheoliadau Awdurdodau Lleol (Trefniadau Gweithrediaeth) (Penderfyniadau, Dogfennau a Chyfarfodydd) a'r Pwyllgorau Safonau (Cymru) (Diwygio) 2007 (S.I. 2007 Rhif 951 (Cy.82))
- The Town and Country Planning (General Permitted Development) (Amendment) (Wales) Order 2007 (S.I. 2007 No. 952 (W.83))
- Gorchymyn Cynllunio Gwlad a Thref (Datblygu Cyffredinol a Ganiateir) (Diwygio) (Cymru) 2007 (S.I. 2007 Rhif 952 (Cy.83))
- The Local Health Boards (Constitution, Membership and Procedures) (Wales) (Amendment) Regulations 2007 (S.I. 2007 No. 953 (W.84))
- Rheoliadau Byrddau Iechyd Lleol (Cyfansoddiad, Aelodaeth a Gweithdrefnau) (Cymru) (Diwygio) 2007 (S.I. 2007 Rhif 953 (Cy.84))
- The References to Health Authorities Order 2007 (S.I. 2007 No. 961 (W.85))
- Gorchymyn Cyfeiriadau at Awdurdodau Iechyd 2007 (S.I. 2007 Rhif 961 (Cy.85))
- The Local Government (Access to Information) (Variation) (Wales) Order 2007 (S.I. 2007 No. 969 (W.86))
- Gorchymyn Llywodraeth Leol (Mynediad at Wybodaeth) (Amrywio) (Cymru) 2007 (S.I. 2007 Rhif 969 (Cy.86))
- The Common Agricultural Policy Single Payment and Support Schemes (Cross-compliance) (Wales) (Amendment) Regulations 2007 (S.I. 2007 No. 970 (W.87))
- Rheoliadau Cynllun Taliad Sengl a Chynlluniau Cymorth y Polisi Amaethyddol Cyffredin (Trawsgydymffurfio) (Cymru) (Diwygio) 2007 (S.I. 2007 Rhif 970 (Cy.87))
- The Designation of Schools Having a Religious Character (Wales) Order 2007 (S.I. 2007 No. 972 (W.88))
- Gorchymyn Dynodi Ysgolion Sydd â Chymeriad Crefyddol (Cymru) 2007 (S.I. 2007 Rhif 972 (Cy.88))
- The Planning and Compulsory Purchase Act 2004 (Commencement No.4 and Consequential, Transitional and Savings Provisions) (Wales) (Amendment No.2) Order 2007 (S.I. 2007 No. 1023 (W.92))
- Gorchymyn Deddf Cynllunio a Phrynu Gorfodol 2004 (Cychwyn Rhif 4 a Darpariaethau Canlyniadol a Throsiannol a Darpariaethau Arbed) (Cymru) (Diwygio Rhif 2) 2007 (S.I. 2007 Rhif 1023 (Cy.92))
- National Health Service (General Ophthalmic Services) (Amendment) (Wales) (No. 2) Regulations 2007 (S.I. 2007 No. 1026 (W.93))
- Rheoliadau'r Gwasanaeth Iechyd Gwladol (Gwasanaethau Offthalmig Cyffredinol) (Diwygio) (Cymru) (Rhif 2) 2007 (S.I. 2007 Rhif 1026 (Cy.93))
- The Welfare of Animals (Miscellaneous Revocations) (Wales) Regulations 2007 (S.I. 2007 No. 1027 (W.94))
- Rheoliadau Lles Anifeiliaid (Dirymiadau Amrywiol) (Cymru) 2007 (S.I. 2007 Rhif 1027 (Cy.94))
- The Docking of Working Dogs' Tails (Wales) Regulations 2007 (S.I. 2007 No. 1028 (W.95))
- Rheoliadau Tocio Cynffonnau Cwn Gwaith (Cymru) 2007 (S.I. 2007 Rhif 1028 (Cy.95))
- The Mutilations (Permitted Procedures) (Wales) Regulations 2007 (S.I. 2007 No. 1029 (W.96))
- Rheoliadau Anffurfio (Triniaethau a Ganiateir) (Cymru) 2007 (S.I. 2007 Rhif 1029 (Cy.96))
- The Animal Welfare Act 2006 (Commencement No. 1) (Wales) Order 2007 (S.I. 2007 No. 1030 (W.97) (C.43))
- Gorchymyn Deddf Lles Anifeiliaid 2006 (Cychwyn Rhif 1) (Cymru) 2007 (S.I. 2007 Rhif 1030 (Cy.97) (C.43))
- The National Health Service (Optical Charges and Payments) (Amendment) (Wales) Regulations 2007 (S.I. 2007 No. 1039 (W.99))
- Rheoliadau'r Gwasanaeth Iechyd Gwladol (Ffioedd a Thaliadau Optegol) (Diwygio) (Cymru) 2007 (S.I. 2007 Rhif 1039 (Cy.99))
- The Notification of Marketing of Food for Particular Nutritional Uses (Wales) Regulations 2007 (S.I. 2007 No. 1040 (W.100))
- Diwygio'r Rheoliadau Hysbysiadau o Farchnata Bwyd at Ddefnydd Maethol Neilltuol (Cymru) 2007 (S.I. 2007 Rhif 1040 (Cy.100))

== 101-200 ==
- The National Assistance (Assessment of Resources and Sums for Personal Requirements) (Amendments) (Wales) Regulations 2007 (S.I. 2007 No. 1041 (W.101))
- Rheoliadau Cymorth Gwladol (Asesu Adnoddau a Symiau at Anghenion Personol) (Diwygio) (Cymru) 2007 (S.I. 2007 Rhif 1041 (Cy.101))
- Health, Social Care and Well-being Strategies (Wales) (Amendment) Regulations 2007 (S.I. 2007 No. 1042 (W.102))
- Rheoliadau Strategaethau Iechyd, Gofal Cymdeithasol a Llesiant (Cymru) (Diwygio) 2007 (S.I. 2007 Rhif 1042 (Cy.102))
- The Road Traffic (Permitted Parking Area and Special Parking Area) (County of the Isle of Anglesey) Order 2007 (S.I. 2007 No. 1043 (W.103))
- Gorchymyn Traffig Ffyrdd (Ardal Barcio a Ganiateir ac Ardal Barcio Arbennig) (Sir Ynys Môn) 2007 (S.I. 2007 Rhif 1043 (Cy.103))
- The Assembly Learning Grants and Loans (Higher Education) (Wales) Regulations 2007 (S.I. 2007 No. 1045 (W.104))
- Rheoliadau Grantiau a Benthyciadau Dysgu y Cynulliad (Addysg Uwch) (Cymru) 2007 (S.I. 2007 Rhif 1045 (Cy.104))
- The Welfare of Animals (Transport) (Wales) Order 2007 (S.I. 2007 No. 1047 (W.105))
- Gorchymyn Lles Anifeiliaid (Cludo) (Cymru) 2007 (S.I. 2007 Rhif 1047 (Cy.105))
- The National Health Service (Optical Charges and Payments) (Amendment) (Wales) (No. 2) Regulations 2007 (S.I. 2007 No. 1048 (W.106))
- Rheoliadau'r Gwasanaeth Iechyd Gwladol (Ffioedd a Thaliadau Optegol) (Diwygio) (Cymru) (Rhif 2) 2007 (S.I. 2007 Rhif 1048 (Cy.106))
- The Children’s Commissioner for Wales (Appointment) (Amendment) Regulations 2007 (S.I. 2007 No. 1049 (W.107))
- Rheoliadau Comisiynydd Plant Cymru (Penodi) (Diwygio) 2007 (S.I. 2007 Rhif 1049 (Cy.107))
- The Local Authorities (Capital Finance and Accounting) (Wales) (Amendment) Regulations 2007 (S.I. 2007 No. 1051 (W.108))
- Rheoliadau Awdurdodau Lleol (Cyllid Cyfalaf a Chyfrifyddu) (Cymru) (Diwygio) 2007 (S.I. 2007 Rhif 1051 (Cy.108))
- The Education (Pupil Referral Units) (Application of Enactments) (Wales) Regulations 2007 (S.I. 2007 No. 1069 (W.109))
- Rheoliadau Addysg (Unedau Cyfeirio Disgyblion) (Cymhwyso Deddfiadau) (Cymru) 2007 (S.I. 2007 Rhif 1069 (Cy.109))
- The Firefighters' Pension Scheme (Wales) Order 2007 (S.I. 2007 No. 1072 (W.110))
- Gorchymyn Cynllun Pensiwn y Diffoddwyr Tân (Cymru) 2007 (S.I. 2007 Rhif 1072 (Cy.110))
- The Firefighters' Compensation Scheme (Wales) Order 2007 (S.I. 2007 No. 1073 (W.111))
- The Firefighters' Pension Scheme (Wales) (Amendment) Order 2007 (S.I. 2007 No. 1074 (W.112))
- The Fire and Rescue National Framework (Wales) 2005 (Revisions) Order 2007 (S.I. 2007 No. 1075 (W.113))
- Gorchymyn Fframwaith Cenedlaethol Tân ac Achub (Cymru) 2005 (Adolygiadau) 2007 (S.I. 2007 Rhif 1075 (Cy.113))
- The Food Supplements (Wales) (Amendment) Regulations 2007 (S.I. 2007 No. 1076 (W.114))
- Rheoliadau Atchwanegiadau Bwyd (Cymru) (Diwygio) 2007 (S.I. 2007 Rhif 1076 (Cy.114))
- The Animals and Animal Products (Import and Export) (Wales) (Imports of Captive Birds) Regulations 2007 (S.I. 2007 No. 1080 (W.127))
- Rheoliadau Anifeiliaid a Chynhyrchion Anifeiliaid (Mewnforio ac Allforio) (Cymru) (Mewnforio Adar Caeth) 2007 (S.I. 2007 Rhif 1080 (Cy.127))
- The Local Authorities (Allowances for Members) (Wales) Regulations 2007 (S.I. 2007 No. 1086 (W.115))
- Rheoliadau Awdurdodau Lleol (Lwfansau i Aelodau) (Cymru) 2007 (S.I. 2007 Rhif 1086 (Cy.115))
- The National Health Service (Travelling Expenses and Remission of Charges) (Wales) Regulations 2007 (S.I. 2007 No. 1104 (W.116))
- Rheoliadau'r Gwasanaeth Iechyd Gwladol (Treuliau Teithio a Pheidio â Chodi Tâl) (Cymru) 2007 (S.I. 2007 Rhif 1104 (Cy.116))
- The National Health Service (Pharmaceutical Services) (Remuneration for Persons providing Pharmaceutical Services) (Amendment) (Wales) Regulations 2007 (S.I. 2007 No. 1112 (W.117))
- Rheoliadau'r Gwasanaeth Iechyd Gwladol (Gwasanaethau Fferyllol) (Taliadau i Bersonau sy'n darparu Gwasanaethau Fferyllol) (Diwygio) (Cymru) 2007 (S.I. 2007 Rhif 1112 (Cy.117))
- The Local Authority Adoption Service (Wales) Regulations 2007 (S.I. 2007 No. 1357 (W.128))
- Rheoliadau Gwasanaeth Mabwysiadu Awdurdodau Lleol (Cymru) 2007 (S.I. 2007 Rhif 1357 (Cy.128))
- The Animals and Animal Products (Import and Export) (Wales) (Laboratories, Circuses and Avian Quarantine) Regulations 2007 (S.I. 2007 No. 1627 (W.137))
- Rheoliadau Anifeiliaid a Chynhyrchion Anifeiliaid (Mewnforio ac Allforio) (Cymru) (Labordai, Syrcasau a Chwarantîn Adarol) 2007 (S.I. 2007 Rhif 1627 (Cy.137))
- The Poultry Breeding Flocks and Hatcheries (Wales) Order 2007 (S.I. 2007 No. 1708 (W.147))
- Gorchymyn Heidiau Bridio Dofednod a Deorfeydd (Cymru) 2007 (S.I. 2007 Rhif 1708 (Cy.147))
- The Products of Animal Origin (Third Country Imports) (Wales) (Amendment) Regulations 2007 (S.I. 2007 No. 1710 (W.148))
- Rheoliadau Cynhyrchion sy'n Dod o Anifeiliaid (Mewnforion Trydydd Gwledydd) (Cymru) (Diwygio) 2007 (S.I. 2007 Rhif 1710 (Cy.148))
- The Traffic Management (Guidance on Intervention Criteria) (Wales) Order 2007 (S.I. 2007 No. 1712 (W.149))
- Gorchymyn Rheoli Traffig (Canllawiau ar Feini Prawf Ymyrryd) (Cymru) 2007 (S.I. 2007 Rhif 1712 (Cy.149))
- The Street Works (Inspection Fees) (Wales) (Amendment) Regulations 2007 (S.I. 2007 No. 1713 (W.150))
- Rheoliadau Gwaith Stryd (Ffioedd Arolygu) (Cymru) (Diwygio) 2007 (S.I. 2007 Rhif 1713 (Cy.150))
- The Plant Health (Import Inspection Fees) (Wales) (Amendment) Regulations 2007 (S.I. 2007 No. 1763 (W.153))
- Rheoliadau Iechyd Planhigion (Ffioedd Arolygu Mewnforio) (Cymru) (Diwygio) 2007 (S.I. 2007 Rhif 1763 (Cy.153))
- The Plant Health (Plant Passport Fees) (Wales) Regulations 2007 (S.I. 2007 No. 1765 (W.154))
- Rheoliadau Iechyd Planhigion (Ffioedd Pasbortau Planhigion) (Cymru) 2007 (S.I. 2007 Rhif 1765 (Cy.154))
- The Bovine Products (Restriction on Placing on the Market) (Wales) (No. 2) (Amendment) Regulations 2007 (S.I. 2007 No. 1835 (W.159))
- Rheoliadau Cynhyrchion Buchol (Cyfyngu ar eu Rhoi ar y Farchnad) (Cymru) (Rhif 2) (Diwygio) 2007 (S.I. 2007 Rhif 1835 (Cy.159))
- The Public Health (Aircraft) (Amendment) (Wales) Regulations 2007 (S.I. 2007 No. 1900 (W.161))
- Rheoliadau Iechyd Cyhoeddus (Awyrennau) (Diwygio) (Cymru) 2007 (S.I. 2007 Rhif 1900 (Cy.161))
- The Public Health (Ships) (Amendment) (Wales) Regulations 2007 (S.I. 2007 No. 1901 (W.162))
- Rheoliadau Iechyd y Cyhoedd (Llongau) (Diwygio) (Cymru) 2007 (S.I. 2007 Rhif 1901 (Cy.162))
- The Spreadable Fats (Marketing Standards) (Wales) (Amendment) Regulations 2007 (S.I. 2007 No. 1905 (W.163))
- Rheoliadau Brasterau Taenadwy (Safonau Marchnata) (Cymru) (Diwygio) 2007 (S.I. 2007 Rhif 1905 (Cy.163))
- The Addition of Vitamins, Minerals and Other Substances (Wales) Regulations 2007 (S.I. 2007 No. 1984 (W.165))
- Rheoliadau Ychwanegu Fitaminau, Mwynau a Sylweddau Eraill (Cymru) 2007 (S.I. 2007 Rhif 1984 (Cy.165))
- The Transmissible Spongiform Encephalopathies (Wales) (Amendment) Regulations 2007 (S.I. 2007 No. 2043 (W.168))
- Rheoliadau Enseffalopathïau Sbyngffurf Trosglwyddadwy (Cymru) (Diwygio) 2007 (S.I. 2007 Rhif 2043 (Cy.168))
- The Welsh Forms of Oaths and Affirmations (Government of Wales Act 2006) Order 2007 (S.I. 2007 No. 2044 (W.169))
- Gorchymyn Ffurfiau Cymraeg Llwon a Chadarnhadau (Deddf Llywodraeth Cymru 2006) 2007 (S.I. 2007 Rhif 2044 (Cy.169))
- The Trinity College, Carmarthen (Designated Institutions in Higher Education) (Wales) Order 2007 (S.I. 2007 No. 2112 (W.170))
- Gorchymyn Coleg y Drindod, Caerfyrddin (Sefydliadau Dynodedig mewn Addysg Uwch) (Cymru) 2007 (S.I. 2007 Rhif 2112 (Cy.170))
- The Marketing of Vegetable Plant Material (Wales) (Amendment) Regulations 2007 (S.I. 2007 No. 2190 (W.174))
- Rheoliadau Marchnata Deunyddiau Planhigion Llysieuol (Cymru) (Diwygio) 2007 (S.I. 2007 Rhif 2190 (Cy.174))
- The Persons Providing Education at Further Education Institutions in Wales (Conditions) Regulations 2007 (S.I. 2007 No. 2220 (W.175))
- Rheoliadau Personau sy'n Darparu Addysg mewn Sefydliadau Addysg Bellach yng Nghymru (Amodau) 2007 (S.I. 2007 Rhif 2220 (Cy.175))
- The Transmissible Spongiform Encephalopathies (Wales) (Amendment) (No.2) Regulations 2007 (S.I. 2007 No. 2244 (W.176))
- Rheoliadau Enseffalopathïau Sbyngffurf Trosglwyddadwy (Cymru) (Diwygio) (Rhif 2) 2007 (S.I. 2007 Rhif 2244 (Cy.176))
- The Food (Suspension of the use of E 128 Red 2G as Food Colour) (Wales) Regulations 2007 (S.I. 2007 No. 2288 (W.178))
- Rheoliadau Bwyd (Atal Defnyddio E 128 Red 2G fel Lliw Bwyd) (Cymru) 2007 (S.I. 2007 Rhif 2288 (Cy.178))
- The Education (Fees and Awards) (Wales) Regulations 2007 (S.I. 2007 No. 2310 (W.181))
- Rheoliadau Addysg (Ffioedd a Dyfarniadau) (Cymru) 2007 (S.I. 2007 Rhif 2310 (Cy.181))
- The Education Maintenance Allowances (Wales) Regulations 2007 (S.I. 2007 No. 2311 (W.182))
- Rheoliadau Lwfansau Cynhaliaeth Addysg (Cymru) 2007 (S.I. 2007 Rhif 2311 (Cy.182))
- The Assembly Learning Grants and Loans (Higher Education) (Wales) (Amendment) Regulations 2007 (S.I. 2007 No. 2312 (W.183))
- Rheoliadau Grantiau a Benthyciadau Dysgu y Cynulliad (Addysg Uwch) (Cymru) (Diwygio) 2007 (S.I. 2007 Rhif 2312 (Cy.183))
- The Assembly Learning Grants (European Institutions) (Wales) Regulations 2007 (S.I. 2007 No. 2313 (W.184))
- Rheoliadau Grantiau Dysgu'r Cynulliad (Sefydliadau Ewropeaidd) (Cymru) 2007 (S.I. 2007 Rhif 2313 (Cy.184))
- The Assembly Learning Grant (Further Education) Regulations 2007 (S.I. 2007 No. 2314 (W.185))
- Rheoliadau Grant Dysgu'r Cynulliad (Addysg Bellach) 2007 (S.I. 2007 Rhif 2314 (Cy.185))
- The Food (Suspension of the use of E 128 Red 2G as Food Colour) (Wales) (No.2) Regulations 2007 (S.I. 2007 No. 2315 (W.186 ))
- Rheoliadau Bwyd (Atal Defnyddio E 128 Red 2G fel Lliw Bwyd) (Cymru) (Rhif 2) 2007 (S.I. 2007 Rhif 2315 (Cy. 186 ))
- The Children and Young People’s Plan (Wales) Regulations 2007 (S.I. 2007 No. 2316 (W.187))
- Rheoliadau Cynllun Plant a Phobl Ifanc (Cymru) 2007 (S.I. 2007 Rhif 2316 (Cy.187))
- The Import and Export Restrictions (Foot-And-Mouth Disease) (Wales) Regulations 2007 (S.I. 2007 No. 2330 (W. 189))
- Private and Voluntary Health Care (Wales) (Amendment) Regulations 2007 (S.I. 2007 No. 2332 (W.190))
- Rheoliadau Gofal Iechyd Preifat a Gwirfoddol (Cymru) (Diwygio) 2007 (S.I. 2007 Rhif 2332 (Cy.190))
- The Common Agricultural Policy (Wine) (Wales) (Amendment) Regulations 2007 (S.I. 2007 No. 2333 (W.191))
- Rheoliadau'r Polisi Amaethyddol Cyffredin (Gwin) (Cymru) (Diwygio) 2007 (S.I. 2007 Rhif 2333 (Cy.191))
- The Planning and Compulsory Purchase Act 2004 (Commencement No.4 and Consequential, Transitional and Savings Provisions) (Wales) (Amendment No.3) Order 2007 (S.I. 2007 No. 2371 (W.194))
- Gorchymyn Diwygio Deddf Cynllunio a Phrynu Gorfodol 2004 (Cychwyn Rhif 4 a Darpariaethau Canlyniadol a Throsiannol a Darpariaethau Arbed) (Cymru) (Diwygio Rhif 3) 2007 (S.I. 2007 Rhif 2371 (Cy.194))
- The Home Loss Payments (Prescribed Amounts) (Wales) Regulations 2007 (S.I. 2007 No. 2372 (W.195))
- Rheoliadau Taliadau Colli Cartref (Symiau Rhagnodedig) (Cymru) 2007 (S.I. 2007 Rhif 2372 (Cy.195))
- The Import and Export Restrictions (Foot-And-Mouth Disease) (No 2) (Wales) Regulations 2007 (S.I. 2007 No. 2385 (W. 196 ))
- The Commons Act 2006 (Commencement No.1, Transitional Provisions and Savings) (Wales) Order 2007 (S.I. 2007 No. 2386 (W. 197 ) (C. 88))
- Gorchymyn Deddf Tiroedd Comin 2006 (Cychwyn Rhif 1, Darpariaethau Trosiannol ac Arbedion) (Cymru) 2007 (S.I. 2007 Rhif 2386 (W.197) (Cy.88))
- The Commons (Registration of Town or Village Greens) (Interim Arrangements) (Wales) Regulations 2007 (S.I. 2007 No. 2396 (W.198 ))
- Rheoliadau Tiroedd Comin (Cofrestru Meysydd Tref neu Bentref) (Trefniadau Interim) (Cymru) 2007 (S.I. 2007 Rhif 2396 (Cy. 198))
- The Agricultural Holdings (Units of Production) (Wales) Order 2007 (S.I. 2007 No. 2398 (W.199))
- Gorchymyn Daliadau Amaethyddol (Unedau Cynhyrchu) (Cymru) 2007 (S.I. 2007 Rhif 2398 (Cy.199))

== 201-300 ==
- The Animal Gatherings (Wales) Order 2007 (S.I. 2007 No. 2425 (W.201 ))
- Gorchymyn Crynoadau Anifeiliaid (Cymru) 2007 (S.I. 2007 Rhif 2425 Cy.201))
- The Non-Domestic Rating (Small Business Relief) (Wales) (Amendment) Order 2007 (S.I. 2007 No. 2438 (W.202))
- Gorchymyn Ardrethu Annomestig (Rhyddhad Ardrethi i Fusnesau Bach) (Cymru) (Diwygio) 2007 (S.I. 2007 Rhif 2438 (Cy.202))
- The Planning and Compulsory Purchase Act 2004 (Commencement No.4 and Consequential, Transitional and Savings Provisions) (Wales) (Amendment No.4) Order 2007 (S.I. 2007 No. 2447 (W. 203 ))
- Gorchymyn Diwygio Deddf Cynllunio a Phrynu Gorfodol 2004 (Cychwyn Rhif 4 a Darpariaethau Canlyniadol a Throsiannol a Darpariaethau Arbed) (Cymru) (Diwygio Rhif 4) 2007 (S.I. 2007 Rhif 2447 (Cy. 203 ))
- The Planning and Compulsory Purchase Act 2004 (Commencement No.4 and Consequential, Transitional and Savings Provisions) (Wales) (Amendment No.5) Order 2007 (S.I. 2007 No. 2449 (W. 205))
- Gorchymyn Deddf Cynllunio a Phrynu Gorfodol 2004 (Cychwyn Rhif 4 a Darpariaethau Canlyniadol a Throsiannol a Darpariaethau Arbed) (Cymru) (Diwygio Rhif 5) 2007 (S.I. 2007 Rhif 2449 (Cy.205))
- The Zoonoses (Monitoring) (Wales) Regulations 2007 (S.I. 2007 No. 2459 (W.207))
- Rheoliadau Milheintiau (Monitro) (Cymru) 2007 (S.I. 2007 Rhif 2459 (Cy.207))
- Welfare of Animals (Slaughter or Killing) (Amendment) (Wales) Regulations 2007 (S.I. 2007 No. 2461 (W.208))
- Rheoliadau Lles Anifeiliaid (Cigydda neu Ladd) (Diwygio) (Cymru) 2007 (S.I. 2007 Rhif 2461 (Cy.208))
- The Disease Control (Wales) (Amendment) Order 2007 (S.I. 2007 No. 2475 (W.211))
- The Foot-and-Mouth Disease (Export Restrictions) (Wales) Regulations 2007 (S.I. 2007 No. 2477 (W.212))
- The Diseases of Animals (Approved Disinfectants) (Amendment) (Wales) Order 2007 (S.I. 2007 No. 2494 (W.214))
- Gorchymyn Clefydau Anifeiliaid (Diheintyddion a Gymeradwywyd) (Diwygio) (Cymru) Gorchymyn 2007 (S.I. 2007 Rhif 2494 (Cy.214))
- The Zoonoses and Animal By-Products (Fees) (Wales) Regulations 2007 (S.I. 2007 No. 2496 (W.215))
- Rheoliadau Milheintiau a Sgil-gynhyrchion Anifeiliaid (Ffioedd) (Cymru) 2007 (S.I. 2007 Rhif 2496 (Cy.215))
- The Commons Registration (General) (Amendment) (Wales) Regulations 2007 (S.I. 2007 No. 2597 (W.220))
- Rheoliadau Cofrestru Tiroedd Comin (Cyffredinol) (Diwygio) (Cymru) 2007 (S.I. 2007 Rhif 2597 (Cy.220))
- The Environmental Impact Assessment and Natural Habitats (Extraction of Minerals by Marine Dredging) (Wales) Regulations 2007 (S.I. 2007 No. 2610 (W.221))
- Rheoliadau Asesu Effeithiau Amgylcheddol a Chynefinoedd Naturiol (Echdynnu Mwynau drwy Dreillio Gwely'r Môr) (Cymru) 2007 (S.I. 2007 Rhif . 2610 (Cy. 221)])
- The Nutrition and Health Claims (Wales) Regulations 2007 (S.I. 2007 No. 2611 (W.222))
- Rheoliadau Honiadau am Faethiad ac Iechyd (Cymru) 2007 (S.I. 2007 Rhif 2611 (Cy.222))
- The Disease Control (Wales) (Amendment) (No. 2) Order 2007 (S.I. 2007 No. 2626 (W.223))
- Gorchymyn Rheoli Clefydau (Cymru) (Diwygio) (Rhif 2) 2007 (S.I. 2007 Rhif 2626 (Cy.223))
- The Import and Export Restrictions (Foot-and-Mouth Disease) (No.3) (Wales) Regulations 2007 (S.I. 2007 No. 2710 (W. 225))
- The Plant Health (Phytophthora ramorum) (Wales) (Amendment) Order 2007 (S.I. 2007 No. 2715 (W.228))
- Gorchymyn Iechyd Planhigion (Phytophthora ramorum) (Cymru) (Diwygio) 2007 (S.I. 2007 Rhif 2715 (Cy.228))
- The Plant Health (Wales) (Amendment) Order 2007 (S.I. 2007 No. 2716 (W.229))
- Gorchymyn Iechyd Planhigion (Cymru) (Diwygio) 2007 (S.I. 2007 Rhif 2716 (Cy.229))
- The Seed (Miscellaneous Amendments) (Wales) Regulations 2007 (S.I. 2007 No. 2747 (W.230))
- Rheoliadau Hadau (Diwygiadau Amrywiol) (Cymru) 2007 (S.I. 2007 Rhif . 2747 (Cy.230)])
- The Food for Particular Nutritional Uses (Miscellaneous Amendments) (Wales) Regulations 2007 (S.I. 2007 No. 2753 (W.232))
- Rheoliadau Bwyd at Ddefnydd Maethol Neilltuol (Diwygiadau Amrywiol) (Cymru) 2007 (S.I. 2007 Rhif 2753 (Cy.232))
- The Education (Listed Bodies) (Wales) Order 2007 (S.I. 2007 No. 2794 (W.234))
- Gorchymyn Addysg (Cyrff sy'n Cael eu Rhestru) (Cymru) 2007 (S.I. 2007 Rhif 2794 (Cy.234))
- The Education (Recognised Bodies) (Wales) Order 2007 (S.I. 2007 No. 2795 (W.235))
- Gorchymyn Addysg (Cyrff sy'n Cael eu Cydnabod) (Cymru) 2007 (S.I. 2007 Rhif 2795 (Cy.235))
- The Diseases of Animals (Approved Disinfectants) (Wales) Order 2007 (S.I. 2007 No. 2803 (W.236))
- Gorchymyn Clefydau Anifeiliaid (Diheintyddion a Gymeradwywyd) (Cymru) 2007 (S.I. 2007 Rhif 2803 (Cy.236))
- The General Teaching Council for Wales (Additional Functions) (Amendment) Order 2007 (S.I. 2007 No. 2810 (W.237))
- Gorchymyn Cyngor Addysgu Cyffredinol Cymru (Swyddogaethau Ychwanegol) (Diwygio) 2007 (S.I. 2007 Rhif 2810 (Cy.237))
- The Education (Amendments to Regulations regarding the Recognition of Professional Qualifications) (Wales) Regulations 2007 (S.I. 2007 No. 2811 (W.238))
- Rheoliadau Addysg (Diwygiadau i Reoliadau ynghylch Cydnabod Cymwysterau Proffesiynol) (Cymru) 2007 (S.I. 2007 Rhif 2811 (Cy.238))
- The Assembly Learning Grants and Loans (Higher Education) (Wales) (Amendment) (No.2) Regulations 2007 (S.I. 2007 No. 2851 (W.248))
- Rheoliadau Grantiau a Benthyciadau Dysgu y Cynulliad (Addysg Uwch) (Cymru) (Diwygio) (Rhif 2) 2007 (S.I. 2007 Rhif 2851 (Cy.248))
- The Administrative Justice and Tribunals Council (Listed Tribunals) (Wales) Order 2007 (S.I. 2007 No. 2876 (W.250))
- Gorchymyn Cyngor Cyfiawnder Gweinyddol a Thribiwnlysoedd (Tribiwnlysoedd a Restrir) (Cymru) 2007 (S.I. 2007 Rhif 2876 (Cy.250))
- The Rural Development Programmes and Agricultural Subsidies and Grants Schemes (Appeals) (Wales) (Amendment) Regulations 2007 (S.I. 2007 No. 2900 (W.251))
- Rheoliadau Rhaglenni Datblygu Gwledig a Chynlluniau Cymorthdaliadau a Grantiau Amaethyddol (Apelau) (Cymru) (Diwygio) 2007 (S.I. 2007 Rhif 2900 (Cy.251))
- The Environmental Impact Assessment (Agriculture) (Wales) Regulations 2007 (S.I. 2007 No. 2933 (W.253))
- Rheoliadau Asesu'r Effeithiau Amgylcheddol (Amaethyddiaeth) (Cymru) 2007 (S.I. 2007 Rhif 2933 (Cy.253))
- The Import and Export Restrictions (Foot-and-Mouth Disease) (No.4) (Wales) Regulations 2007 (S.I. 2007 No. 2971 (W. 255))
- The Government of Wales Act 2006 (Approved European Body of Accountants) Order 2007 (S.I. 2007 No. 2973 (W.256))
- Gorchymyn Deddf Llywodraeth Cymru 2006 (Corff Cyfrifwyr Ewropeaidd Cymeradwy) 2007 (S.I. 2007 Rhif 2973 (Cy.256))
- The Import and Export Restrictions (Foot-and-Mouth Disease) (No.5) (Wales) Regulations 2007 (S.I. 2007 No. 2997 (W.258))
- The Bluetongue (Wales) (Amendment) Order 2007 (S.I. 2007 No. 3002 (W. 259))
- Gorchymyn y Tafod Glas (Cymru) (Diwygio) 2007 (S.I. 2007 Rhif 3002 (Cy. 259))
- The Cattle Identification (Wales) (Amendment) Regulations 2007 (S.I. 2007 No. 3004 (W.260))
- Rheoliadau Adnabod Gwartheg (Cymru) (Diwygio) 2007 (S.I. 2007 Rhif 3004 (Cy.260 ))
- The Bluetongue (Wales) (Compensation) Order 2007 (S.I. 2007 No. 3010 (W.261))
- Gorchymyn y Tafod Glas (Cymru) (Digolledu) 2007 (S.I. 2007 Rhif 3010 (Cy.261))
- The Animal Welfare Act 2006 (Commencement No. 2 and Saving and Transitional Provisions) (Wales) Order 2007 (S.I. 2007 No. 3065 (W.262) (C.120))
- Gorchymyn Deddf Lles Anifeiliaid 2006 (Cychwyn Rhif 2 ac Arbedion a Darpariaethau Trosiannol) (Cymru) 2007 (S.I. 2007 Rhif 3065 (Cy.262) (C.120))
- The Maintained Schools (Partnership Agreements) (Wales) Regulations 2007 (S.I. 2007 No. 3066 (W.263))
- Rheoliadau Ysgolion a Gynhelir (Cytundebau Partneriaeth) (Cymru) 2007 (S.I. 2007 Rhif 3066 (Cy.263))
- The Welfare of Farmed Animals (Wales) Regulations 2007 (S.I. 2007 No. 3070 (W.264))
- Rheoliadau Lles Anifeiliaid a Ffermir (Cymru) 2007 (Wales) (S.I. 2007 Rhif 3070 (Cy.264))
- The Substance Misuse (Formulation and Implementation of Strategy) (Wales) Regulations 2007 (S.I. 2007 No. 3078 (W.265))
- Rheoliadau Camddefnyddio Sylweddau (Llunio a Gweithredu Strategaeth) (Cymru) 2007 (S.I. 2007 Rhif 3078 (Cy.265))
- The Import and Export Restrictions (Foot-and-Mouth Disease) (No.6) (Wales) Regulations 2007 (S.I. 2007 No. 3140 (W. 266))
- The Bluetongue (Wales) Order 2007 (S.I. 2007 No. 3150 (W.267))
- The Mobile Homes Act 1983 (Amendment of Schedule 1) (Wales) Order 2007 (S.I. 2007 No. 3151 (W.268))
- Gorchymyn Deddf Cartrefi Symudol 1983 (Diwygio Atodlen 1) (Cymru) 2007 (S.I. 2007 Rhif 3151 (Cy.268))
- The Rating Lists (Valuation Date) (Wales) Order 2007 (S.I. 2007 No. 3153 (W.269))
- Gorchymyn y Rhestrau Ardrethu (Dyddiad Prisio) (Cymru) 2007 (S.I. 2007 Rhif 3153 (Cy.269))
- The Service Charges (Summary of Rights and Obligations, and Transitional Provisions) (Wales) Regulations 2007 (S.I. 2007 No. 3160 (W.271))
- Rheoliadau Taliadau Gwasanaeth (Crynodeb o Hawliau a Rhwymedigaethau, a Darpariaethau Trosiannol) (Cymru) 2007 (S.I. 2007 Rhif 3160 (Cy.271))
- The Commonhold and Leasehold Reform Act 2002 (Commencement No.4) (Wales) Order 2007 (S.I. 2007 No. 3161 (W.272) (C.128))
- Gorchymyn Deddf Cyfunddaliad a Diwygio Cyfraith Lesddaliad 2002 (Cychwyn Rhif 4) (Cymru) 2007 (S.I. 2007 Rhif 3161 (Cy.272) (C.128))
- The Administration Charges (Summary of Rights and Obligations) (Wales) Regulations 2007 (S.I. 2007 No. 3162 (W.273))
- Rheoliadau Taliadau Gweinyddol (Crynodeb o Hawliau a Rhwymedigaethau) (Cymru) 2007 (S.I. 2007 Rhif 3162 (Cy.273))
- The Caravan Sites Act 1968 (Amendment) (Wales) Order 2007 (S.I. 2007 No. 3163 (W.274))
- Gorchymyn Deddf Safleoedd Carafanau 1968 (Diwygio) (Cymru) 2007 (S.I. 2007 Rhif 3163 (Cy.274))
- The Mobile Homes (Written Statement) (Wales) Regulations 2007 (S.I. 2007 No. 3164 (W.275))
- Rheoliadau Cartrefi Symudol (Datganiad Ysgrifenedig) (Cymru) 2007 (S.I. 2007 Rhif 3164 (Cy.275))
- The Natural Mineral Water, Spring Water and Bottled Drinking Water (Wales) Regulations 2007 (S.I. 2007 No. 3165 (W.276))
- Rheoliadau Dŵr Mwynol Naturiol, Dŵr Ffynnon a Dŵr Yfed wedi'i Botelu (Cymru) 2007 (S.I. 2007 Rhif 3165 (Cy.276))
- The Feed (Specified Undesirable Substances) (Wales) Regulations 2007 (S.I. 2007 No. 3171 (W.277))
- Rheoliadau Bwyd Anifeiliaid (Sylweddau Annymunol Penodedig) (Cymru) 2007 (S.I. 2007 Rhif 3171 (Cy.277))
- The Feed (Corn Gluten Feed and Brewers Grains) (Emergency Control) (Wales) (Revocation) Regulations 2007 (S.I. 2007 No. 3173 (W.278))
- Rheoliadau Bwyd Anifeiliaid (Glwten Ŷd a Grawn Bragu) (Rheolaeth Frys) (Cymru) (Dirymu) 2007 (S.I. 2007 Rhif 3173 (Cy.278))
- The Traffic Management Act 2004 (Commencement No. 2 and Transitional Provisions) (Wales) Order 2007 (S.I. 2007 No. 3174 (W.279) (C.130))
- Gorchymyn Deddf Rheoli Traffig 2004 (Cychwyn Rhif 2 a Darpariaethau Trosiannol) (Cymru) 2007 (S.I. 2007 Rhif 3174 (Cy.279) (C.130))
- The Fire and Rescue Services (Emergencies) (Wales) Order 2007 (S.I. 2007 No. 3193 (W.280))
- Gorchymyn Gwasanaethau Tân ac Achub (Argyfyngau) (Cymru) 2007 (S.I. 2007 Rhif 3193 (Cy.280))
- The Licensing and Management of Houses in Multiple Occupation (Additional Provisions) (Wales) Regulations 2007 (S.I. 2007 No. 3229 (W.281))
- Rheoliadau Trwyddedu a Rheoli Tai Amlfeddiannaeth (Darpariaethau Ychwanegol) (Cymru) 2007 (S.I. 2007 Rhif 3229 (Cy.281))
- The Assembly Learning Grants and Loans (Higher Education) (Wales) (Amendment) (No.3) Regulations 2007 (S.I. 2007 No. 3230 (W.282))
- Rheoliadau Grantiau a Benthyciadau Dysgu y Cynulliad (Addysg Uwch) (Cymru) (Diwygio) (Rhif 3) 2007 (S.I. 2007 Rhif 3230 (Cy.282))
- The Houses in Multiple Occupation (Certain Blocks of Flats) (Modifications to the Housing Act 2004 and Transitional Provisions for section 257 HMOs) (Wales) Regulations 2007 (S.I. 2007 No. 3231 (W.283))
- Rheoliadau Tai Amlfeddiannaeth (Blociau Fflatiau Penodol) (Addasiadau i Ddeddf Tai 2004 a Darpariaethau Trosiannol ar gyfer HMOs adran 257) (Cymru) 2007 (S.I. 2007 Rhif 3231 (Cy.283))
- The Housing Act 2004 (Commencement No 5) (Wales) Order 2007 (S.I. 2007 No. 3232 (W.284) (C.132))
- Gorchymyn Deddf Tai 2004 (Cychwyn Rhif 5) (Cymru) 2007 (S.I. 2007 Rhif 3232 (Cy.284) (C.132))
- Housing (Assessment of Accommodation Needs) (Meaning of Gypsies and Travellers) (Wales) Regulations 2007 (S.I. 2007 No. 3235 (W.285))
- Rheoliadau Tai (Asesiad o Anghenion Llety) (Ystyr Sipsiwn a Theithwyr) (Cymru) 2007 (S.I. 2007 Rhif 3235 (Cy.285))
- The Police and Justice Act 2006 (Commencement No. 1) (Wales) Order 2007 (S.I. 2007 No. 3251 (W.268) (C.133))
- Gorchymyn Deddf yr Heddlu a Chyfiawnder 2006 (Cychwyn Rhif 1) (Cymru) 2007 (S.I. 2007 Rhif 3251 (Cy.268) (C.133))
- The Materials and Articles in Contact with Food (Wales) Regulations 2007 (S.I. 2007 No. 3252 (W.287))
- Rheoliadau Deunyddiau ac Eitemau mewn Cysylltiad â Bwyd (Cymru) 2007 (S.I. 2007 Rhif 3252 (Cy.287))
- The Animals and Animal Products (Import and Export) (Wales) (Amendment) Regulations 2007 (S.I. 2007 No. 3279 (W. 288))
- The Disability Discrimination Act 2005 (Commencement No. 1) (Wales) Order 2007 (S.I. 2007 No. 3285 (W.289) (C.134))
- Gorchymyn Deddf Gwahaniaethu ar sail Anabledd 2005 (Cychwyn Rhif 1) (Cymru) 2007 (S.I. 2007 Rhif 3285 (Cy.289) (C.134))
- The Official Feed and Food Controls (Wales) Regulations 2007 (S.I. 2007 No. 3294 (W.290))
- Rheoliadau Rheolaethau Swyddogol ar Fwyd Anifeiliaid a Bwyd (Cymru) 2007 (S.I. 2007 Rhif 3294 (Cy.290))
- The Export and Movement Restrictions (Foot-and-Mouth Disease) (Wales) Regulations 2007 (S.I. 2007 No. 3296 (W.291))
- The Plant Health (Wales) (Amendment) (No. 2) Order 2007 (S.I. 2007 No. 3305 (W.292))
- Gorchymyn Iechyd Planhigion (Cymru) (Diwygio) (Rhif 2) 2007 (S.I. 2007 Rhif 3305 (Cy.292))
- The Plant Health (Import Inspection Fees) (Wales) (Amendment) (No.2) Regulations 2007 (S.I. 2007 No. 3306 (W.293))
- Rheoliadau Iechyd Planhigion (Ffioedd Arolygu Mewnforio) (Cymru) (Diwygio) (Rhif 2) 2007 (S.I. 2007 Rhif 3306 (Cy.293))
- The Bluetongue (No. 2) (Wales) Order 2007 (S.I. 2007 No. 3309 (W.294))
- The Non-Domestic Rating Contributions (Wales) (Amendment) Regulations 2007 (S.I. 2007 No. 3343 (W.295))
- Rheoliadau Cyfraniadau Ardrethu Annomestig (Cymru) (Diwygio) 2007 (S.I. 2007 Rhif 3343 (Cy.295))
- The Non-Domestic Rating (Unoccupied Property) (Amendment) (Wales) Regulations 2007 (S.I. 2007 No. 3354 (W.296))
- Rheoliadau Ardrethu Annomestig (Eiddo Heb ei Feddiannu) (Diwygio) (Cymru) 2007 (S.I. 2007 Rhif 3354 (Cy.296))
- The Contaminants in Food (Wales) (Amendment) Regulations 2007 (S.I. 2007 No. 3368 (W.297))
- Rheoliadau Halogion mewn Bwyd (Cymru) (Diwygio) 2007 (S.I. 2007 Rhif 3368 (Cy.297))
- The Clean Neighbourhoods and Environment Act 2005 (Commencement No. 3) (Wales) Order 2007 (S.I. 2007 No. 3371 (W.298) (C.141))
- Gorchymyn Deddf Cymdogaethau Glân a'r Amgylchedd 2005 (Cychwyn Rhif 3) (Cymru) 2007 (S.I. 2007 Rhif 3371 (Cy.298) (C.141))
- The Water Supply (Water Quality) Regulations 2001 (Amendment) Regulations 2007 (S.I. 2007 No. 3374 (W.299))
- The Avian Influenza (H5N1) (Miscellaneous Amendments) (Wales) Order 2007 (S.I. 2007 No. 3375 (W.300))
- Gorchymyn Ffliw Adar (H5N1) (Diwygiadau Amrywiol) (Cymru) 2007 (S.I. 2007 Rhif 3375 (Cy.300))

== 301-400 ==
- The Food Labelling (Declaration of Allergens) (Wales) Regulations 2007 (S.I. 2007 No. 3379 (W.301))
- Rheoliadau Labelu Bwyd (Datgan Alergenau) (Cymru) 2007 (S.I. 2007 Rhif 3379 (Cy.301))
- The Non-Domestic Rating (Demand Notices) (Wales) (Amendment) Regulations 2007 (S.I. 2007 No. 3399 (W.303))
- Rheoliadau Ardrethu Annomestig (Hysbysiadau Galw am Dalu) (Cymru) (Diwygio) 2007 (S.I. 2007 Rhif 3399 (Cy.303))
- The National Park Authorities (Wales) (Amendment) Order 2007 (S.I. 2007 No. 3423 (W.304))
- Gorchymyn Awdurdodau Parciau Cenedlaethol (Cymru) (Diwygio) 2007 (S.I. 2007 Rhif 3423 (Cy.304))
- The Export and Movement Restrictions (Foot-and-Mouth Disease) (No.2) (Wales) Regulations 2007 (S.I. 2007 No.3441 (W.305)])
- The Meat (Official Controls Charges) (Wales) (No. 2) Regulations 2007 (S.I. 2007 No. 3461 (W.306))
- Rheoliadau Cig (Ffioedd Rheolaethau Swyddogol) (Cymru) (Rhif 2) 2007 (S.I. 2007 Rhif 3461 (Cy.306))
- The Fishery Products (Official Controls Charges) (Wales) Regulations 2007 (S.I. 2007 No. 3462 (W.307))
- Rheoliadau Cynhyrchion Pysgodfeydd (Taliadau Rheolaethau Swyddogol) (Cymru) 2007 (S.I. 2007 Rhif 3462 (Cy.307))
- The Education (Student Loans) (Re<?amendment type=start time=1200308415078?>p<?amendment type=end time=1200308415078?>payment) (Amendment) (Wales) Regulations 2007 (S.I. 2007 No. 3509 (W.308))
- Rheoliadau Addysg (Benthyciadau i Fyfyrwyr) (Ad-dalu) (Diwygio) (Cymru) 2007 (S.I. 2007 Rhif 3509 (Cy.308))
- The Export Restrictions (Foot-and-Mouth Disease) (Wales) Regulations 2007 (S.I. 2007 No. 3518 (W.310))
- The Environmental Noise (Identification of Noise Sources) (Wales) Regulations 2007 (S.I. 2007 No. 3519 (W.311))
- Rheoliadau Sŵn Amgylcheddol (Nodi Ffynonellau Sŵn) (Cymru) 2007 (S.I. 2007 Rhif 3519 (Cy.311))
- The Education (Information About Individual Pupils) (Wales) Regulations 2007 (S.I. 2007 No. 3562 (W.312))
- Rheoliadau Addysg (Gwybodaeth am Ddisgyblion Unigol) (Cymru) 2007 (S.I. 2007 Rhif 3562 (Cy.312))
- The Education (Pupil Information) (Wales) (Amendment) Regulations 2007 (S.I. 2007 No. 3563 (W.313))
- Rheoliadau Addysg (Gwybodaeth am Ddisgyblion) (Cymru) (Diwygio) 2007 (S.I. 2007 Rhif 3563 (Cy.313))
- The Education (School Performance Information) (Wales) (Amendment) Regulations 2007 (S.I. 2007 No. 3564 (W.314))
- Rheoliadau Addysg (Gwybodaeth am Berfformiad Ysgolion) (Cymru) (Diwygio) 2007 (S.I. 2007 Rhif 3564 (Cy.314))
- The Further Education and Training Act 2007 (Commencement No. 1) (Wales) Order 2007 (S.I. 2007 No. 3565 (W.315) (C.155))
- Gorchymyn Deddf Addysg Bellach a Hyfforddiant 2007 (Cychwyn Rhif 1) (Cymru) 2007 (S.I. 2007 Rhif 3565 (Cy.315) (C.155))
- The Infant Formula and Follow-on Formula (Wales) Regulations 2007 (S.I. 2007 No. 3573 (W.316))
- Rheoliadau Fformiwla Fabanod a Fformiwla Ddilynol (Cymru) 2007 (S.I. 2007 Rhif 3573 (Cy.316))
- The Education Act 2002 (Commencement No. 11 and Transitional and Savings Provisions) (Wales) Order 2007 (S.I. 2007 No. 3611 (W.318) (C.157))
- Gorchymyn Deddf Addysg 2002 (Cychwyn Rhif 11 a Darpariaethau Trosiannol ac Arbed) (Cymru) 2007 (S.I. 2007 Rhif 3611 (Cy.318) (C.157))
